= List of writers by name: S =

The following is a List of writers by name whose last names begin with S:

Abbreviations: ch = children's; d = drama, screenwriting; f = fiction; nf = non-fiction; p = poetry, song lyrics

== Sa–Sb ==
- Nawal El Saadawi (1931–2021, Egypt, nf)
- Suhayl Saadi (born 1961, England/Scotland, f/d)
- Ferdinand von Saar (1833–1906, Austria, f/d/p)
- Rafael Saavedra (1967–2013, Mexico, f/nf)
- Umberto Saba (1883–1957, Austria-Hungary/Italy, p/f)
- Ernesto Sabato (1911–2011, Argentina, f/nf)
- Moinul Ahsan Saber (born 1958, Bangladesh, f/d)
- Fred Saberhagen (1930–2007, US, f)
- Mohammed Sabila (1942–2021, Morocco, nf)
- Jaime Sabines (1926–1999, Mexico, p)
- Fernando Sabino (1923–2004, Brazil, f)
- Mário de Sá-Carneiro (1890–1916, Portugal/France, p/d/f)
- Louis Sachar (born 1954, US, f/ch)
- Carlos Alberto Sacheri (1933–1974, Argentina, nf)
- Leopold von Sacher-Masoch (1836–1895, Austrian E/Germany, f/nf)
- Hans Sachs (1494–1576, Germany, p/d)
- Nelly Sachs (1891–1970, Germany/Sweden, p/d)
- Charles Sackville, 6th Earl of Dorset (1643–1706, England, p)
- Thomas Sackville, 1st Earl of Dorset (1536–1608, England, p/d)
- Vita Sackville-West (1892–1962, England, f/p/nf)
- Johannes de Sacrobosco (c. 1195 – c. 1256, France, nf)
- Tayeb Saddiki (1939–2016, Morocco, d)
- Marquis de Sade (1740–1814, France, f/d/nf)
- Abdoulaye Sadji (1910–1961, Senegal, f/ch)
- Michael Sadler (1861–1943, England, nf)
- Michael Sadleir (1888–1967, England, f/nf)
- Ion Marin Sadoveanu (1893–1964, Romania, d)
- Mihail Sadoveanu (1880–1961, Romania, f/nf)
- Gholam-Hossein Sa'edi (1936–1985, Iran/France, d/f)
- Sæmundr fróði (1056–1133, Iceland, nf)
- Benjamin Alire Sáenz (born 1954, US, p/f/ch)
- Jaime Sáenz (1921–1986, Bolivia, p/f)
- Juan José Saer (1937–2005, Argentina, p/f)
- Wera Sæther (born 1945, Norway, p/f/nf)
- Tómas Sæmundsson (1807–1841, Iceland, nf)
- Juan José Saer (1937–2005, Argentina, p/f)
- Nazi Safavi (born 1967, Iran, f)
- Pavel Jozef Šafárik (1795–1861, Austria-Hungary, nf/p)
- Peter Sagal (born 1965, US, f/d)
- Carl Sagan (1934–1996, US, nf)
- Françoise Sagan (1935–2004, France, d/f)
- Nick Sagan (born 1970, US, f/d)
- Buddhi Sagar (born 1981, Nepal, f/p)
- Angie Sage (born 1952, England, ch)
- Sarojini Sahoo (born 1956, India, f)
- A. Samad Said (born 1935, Malaya/Malaysia, f/p)
- Abdel Said (born 1974, Morocco, p)
- Amina Said (born 1953, Tunisia/France, p/f/nf)
- Mekkawi Said (1956–2017, Egypt, f)
- Saigyō (西行法師, 1118–1190, Japan, p)
- Bhabendra Nath Saikia (1932–2003, India, f/ch/nf)
- Sao Saimong (1913–1987, Burma, nf)
- Janou Saint-Denis (1930–2000, Canada, p/nf)
- Mellin de Saint-Gelais (c. 1491–1558, France, p)
- Charles Augustin Sainte-Beuve (1804–1869, France, nf)
- Benoît de Sainte-Maure (died 1173, France, p)
- Antoine de Saint-Exupéry (1900–1944, France, f/p/nf)
- Mellin de Saint-Gelais (c. 1491–1558, France, p)
- Jean François de Saint-Lambert (1716–1803, France, p/nf)
- Jacques-Henri Bernardin de Saint-Pierre (1737–1814, France, f/nf/ch)
- Sait Faik (1906–1954, Ottoman E/Turkey, f/p)
- Mokichi Saitō (斎藤茂吉, 1882–1953, Japan, p)
- Saitō Ryokuu (斎藤緑雨, 1868–1904, Japan, nf)
- Sakae Saitō (斉藤栄, born 1933, Japan, f)
- Baja Saitović-Lukin (1954–2017, Yugoslavia/Serbia, p)
- Ango Sakaguchi (坂口安吾, 1906–1965, Japan, f/nf)
- Widad Sakakini (1913–1991, Lebanon, f/nf)
- Abdelaziz Baraka Sakin (born 1963, Sudan/Austria, f)
- Salama Ahmed Salama (1932–2012, Egypt, nf)
- Tomaž Šalamun (1941–2014, Yugoslavia/Slovenia, p)
- Marina Salandy-Brown (living, Trinidad, nf)
- Salarrué (1899–1975, El Salvador, f/p), born Luis Salvador Efraín Salazar Arrué
- Mariano Picón Salas (1901–1965, Venezuela, nf)
- Dušan Salatić (born 1929, Yugoslavia/Serbia, nf)
- Abel Salazar (1889–1946, Portugal, nf)
- Ibtihal Salem (1949–2015, Egypt, f)
- William Salesbury (c. 1520 – c. 1584, Wales, nf)
- Emilio Salgari (1862–1911, Italy, f)
- Nino Salia (1898–1992, Russian E/France, nf)
- André Salifou (1942–2022, Niger, nf)
- Tayeb Salih (1929–2009, Sudan/England, f/nf)
- Pedro Salinas (1891–1951, Spain/US, p/nf)
- J. D. Salinger (1919–2010, US, f)
- Andrew Salkey (1928–1995, Panama/US, f/p/ch)
- Amadou Lamine Sall (born 1951, Senegal, p)
- Tijan Sallah (born 1958, Gambia, f/nf)
- Eva Sallis (born 1964, Australia, f/p)
- James Sallis (1944–2026, US, p/f/nf)
- Ibrahim 'Ali Salman (1937–1995, Sudan, p)
- André Salmon (1881–1969, France, p/nf)
- Philip Salom (born 1950, Australia, p/f)
- Ernst von Salomon (1902–1972, Germany, nf)
- Henry Stephens Salt (1851–1939, India/England, nf)
- Felix Salten (1869–1945, Hungary/Switzerland, d/f/ch)
- Rapolas Šaltenis (1908–2007, Lithuania, nf)
- Mikhail Saltykov-Shchedrin (1826–1889, Russian E, f/ch)
- R. A. Salvatore (born 1959, US, f)
- Gaetano Salvemini (1873–1957, Italy, nf)
- Christian Gotthilf Salzmann (1744–1811, Germany, nf)
- Balkrishna Sama (1903–1981, Nepal, d)
- Albert Samain (1858–1900, France, p)
- Akim Samar (1916–1943, Russia/USSR, p/f)
- Preeta Samarasan (living, Malaysia, f)
- Miloslav Samardžić (born 1963, Yugoslavia/Serbia, nf)
- Abdi Ismail Samatar (born 1950, Somaliland, nf)
- Ahmed Ismail Samatar (born 1950, Somaliland, nf)
- Said Sheikh Samatar (1943–2015, Ethiopia/US, nf)
- Stanlake J. W. T. Samkange (1922–1988, S Rhodesia/Zimbabwe, nf)
- Anthony Sampson (1926–2004, England, nf)
- Fiona Samuel (born 1961, N Zealand, d)
- Wolfgang W.E. Samuel (born 1935, Germany/US, nf)
- Hossein Sanapour (born 1960, Iran, f/nf/ch)
- Alex Sánchez (born 1957, Mexico/US, f/ch)
- Luis Rafael Sánchez (born 1936, Puerto Rico, nf/f/d)
- Sonia Sanchez (born 1934, US, p/f/ch), born Wilsonia Benita Driver
- George Sand (1804–1876, France, f/nf)
- Michal Šanda (born 1965, Czechoslovakia/Czech R, p/nf/ch)
- Ma Sandar (born 1947, Burma/Myanmar, f)
- Carl Sandburg (1878–1967, US, p/nf)
- Cora Sandel (1880–1974, Norway, f), pseudonym of Sara Cecilia Görvell Fabricius
- Aksel Sandemose (1899–1965, Denmark/Norway, f/nf)
- Ben Sanders (born 1989, N Zealand, f)
- Brandon Sanderson (born 1975, US, f)
- Jane Sanderson (born 1962, England, f)
- Sarah Sands (born 1961, England, f/nf)
- Elspeth Sandys (born 1940, N Zealand, f/p/nf)
- Andrew Sanger (born 1948, England, nf/f)
- Clyde Sanger (1928–2022, England/Canada, nf)
- Khagendra Sangraula (born 1946, Nepal, f/nf)
- Sabah Sanhouri (born 1990, Sudan, f/p)
- Parinoush Saniee (living, Iran, f)
- José Ignacio de Sanjinés (1786–1864, Bolivia, p)
- Uthaya Sankar SB (born 1972, Malaysia, nf)
- Wilton G. S. Sankawulo (1937–2009, Liberia, f)
- Rahul Sankrityayan (1893–1963, India, nf)
- Juan Zorrilla de San Martín (1855–1931, Uruguay, p)
- Sanmao (三毛, 1943–1991, Taiwan, nf/f)
- Jacopo Sannazaro (1458–1530, Italy, p/nf)
- Lamin Sanneh (1942–2019, Gambia, nf)
- Adiza Sanoussi (living, Burkina Faso, f), pseudonym of Alizata Sana
- Boualem Sansal (born 1949, Algeria, f/nf)
- Ann Sansom (living, England, p)
- Clive Sansom (1910–1981, England/Australia, p/d)
- Andrew Sant (born 1950, Australia, p/nf)
- Ferenc Sánta (1927–2008, Romania/Hungary, f/d)
- Ana de Santana (born 1960, Angola, p/nf)
- Glória de Sant'Anna (1925–2009, Mozambique, p)
- Sérgio Sant'Anna (1841–1920, Brazil, p/d/f)
- Bernardo Santareno (1920–1980, Portugal, p/nf/d)
- George Santayana (1863–1952, Spain/Italy, nf/f/p)
- Dan Santat (born 1975, US, ch)
- Esmeralda Santiago (born 1948, Puerto Rico, nf)
- Aleksa Šantić (1868–1924, Ottoman E/Yugoslavia, p)
- Diego Abad de Santillán (1897–1938, Argentina, nf)
- Alda Neves da Graça do Espírito Santo (1926–2010, São Tomé and Príncipe/Angola, p)
- Santōka Taneda (種田山頭火, 1882–1940, Japan, p), born Taneda Shōichi (種田正一)
- Ana Eduarda Santos (born 1983, Portugal, f/d)
- Ary dos Santos (1936–1984, Portugal, p)
- Bienvenido Santos (1911–1996, Philippines/US, f/p/nf)
- João dos Santos (died 1622, Portugal/India, nf)
- Lope K. Santos (1879–1963, Philippines, f/nf)
- Marcelino dos Santos (1929–2020, Mozambique, p)
- Mayra Santos-Febres (born 1966, Puerto Rico, p/f/ch)
- Mithu Sanyal (born 1971, Germany, f/nf)
- Mitsugu Saotome (早乙女貢, 1926–2008, Japan)
- Milorad Popović Šapčanin (1841–1895, Serbia, f/p/d)
- Genrikh Sapgir (1928–1999, USSR, p/f)
- Amanullah Sailaab Sapi (1933–1979, Afghanistan, p)
- Sappho (c. 630 – c. 570 BCE, Greece, p)
- Humira Saqib (born 1980, Afghanistan, nf)
- Thouria Saqqat (1935–1992, Morocco, ch)
- José Hermano Saraiva (1919–2012, Portugal, nf)
- Adrijan Sarajlija (born 1976, Yugoslavia/Serbia, f)
- Sima Milutinović Sarajlija (1791–1847, Ottoman E/Serbia, p/nf)
- José Saramago (1922–2010, Portugal/Spain, nf/f)
- Ghadam-Ali Sarami (born 1944, Iran, nf/p/d)
- Vilas Sarang (1942–2015, India, f/p/nf)
- Jaydeep Sarangi (born 1973, India, nf/p)
- Dinu Săraru (1932–2024, Romania, f/d)
- Dipti Saravanamuttu (born 1960, Sri Lanka/Australia, p/f)
- John Mensah Sarbah (1864–1910, Gold Coast, nf)
- Maciej Kazimierz Sarbiewski (1595–1640, Poland, p/nf)
- António Sardinha (1887–1925, Portugal, nf)
- Pedro Pérez Sarduy (born 1943, Cuba/England, p/f)
- Severo Sarduy (1937–1993, Cuba, p/f/d)
- Pamela Sargent (born 1948, US, f/nf)
- Frank Sargeson (1903–1982, N Zealand, f)
- Petar Šarić (1937–2023, Yugoslavia/Kosovo, p/f/d)
- Yishai Sarid (born 1965, Israel, f)
- Duncan Sarkies (living, N Zealand, d/f)
- György Sárközi (1899–1945, Hungary, p/nf), Holocaust victim
- Beatriz Sarlo (born 1942, Argentina, nf)
- Jacob de Castro Sarmento (1692–1762, Portugal, nf/p)
- Domingo Faustino Sarmiento (1911–1988, Argentina, nf)
- Dušan Šarotar (born 1968, Yugoslavia/Slovenia, nf/f/p)
- Ken Saro-Wiwa (1941–1995, Nigeria, d/nf)
- Noo Saro-Wiwa (born 1976, Nigeria/England, nf)
- William Saroyan (1908–1981, US, f/d/p)
- Alioune Sarr (1908–2001, Senegal, nf)
- Al Sarrantonio (born 1952, US, f)
- Nathalie Sarraute (1900–1999, Russian E/France, f/d/nf)
- Maren Sars (1911–1998, Norway, f)
- George Sarton (1884–1956, Belgium/US, nf)
- Jean-Paul Sartre (1905–1980, France, nf/d/f)
- Nobutsuna Sasaki (佐佐木信綱, 1872–1963, Japan, p)
- Williams Sassine (1944–1997, Guinea/France, f)
- Siegfried Sassoon (1886–1967, England, p/f/nf)
- Subagio Sastrowardoyo (1924–1995, Dutch E Indies/Indonesia, p/f/nf)
- Ineko Sata (佐多稲子, 1904–1998, Japan, nf/f)
- Július Satinský (1941–2002, Czechoslovakia/Slovakia, d/nf)
- Satsvarupa dasa Goswami (born 1939, US, nf/f/p), born Stephen Guarino
- Gilbert Saulnier du Verdier (? –1686, France, f)
- George Saunders (born 1958, US, f/nf/ch)
- Jen Saunders (born 1962, Australia, p)
- Margaret Marshall Saunders (1861–1947, Canada, ch/f/nf)
- William Saunders (1806–1851, Wales)
- Henriette Sauret (1890–1976, France), p/nf)
- Richard Savage (c. 1697–1743, England, p)
- Léon Savary (1895–1968, Switzerland/France, nf)
- Fernando Savater (born 1947, Spain, nf)
- Constance Savery (1897–1999, England, f/ch)
- Milisav Savić (born 1945, Yugoslavia/Serbia, f/nf)
- Jaya Savige (born 1978, Australia, p)
- Annie Gregg Savigny (c. 1838–1901, Canada, f/ch)
- George Savile, 1st Marquess of Halifax (1633–1695, England, nf)
- Steven Savile (born 1969, England/Sweden, f/nf)
- Malcolm Saville (1901–1982, England, ch/nf)
- Alberto Savinio (1891–1952, Italy, nf/d)
- John Sawyer (1919–1992, England, f), co-author of wife Nancy Buckingham
- Robert J. Sawyer (born 1960, Canada, f)
- Ruth Sawyer (1880–1970, US, f/nf/ch)
- Pol Sax (born 1960, Luxembourg/Germany, f/nf)
- Allen Say (born 1937, Japan/US, ch), pseudonym of James Allen Koichi Moriwaki Seii
- Sayat-Nova (1712–1795, Armenia, p)
- Abdullah Abu Sayeed (born 1940, India/Bangladesh, nf)
- Dorothy L. Sayers (1893–1957, England, f/p)
- Isabelle Sbrissa (born 1971, Switzerland,

== Sc ==
- Leslie Scalapino (1944–2010, US, p/nf/d)
- Kurtis Scaletta (living, US, ch)
- Nelle Scanlan (1882–1968, N Zealand, f/nf)
- Paul Scarron (1610–1660, France, p/d/f)
- Simon Scarrow (born 1962, England, f)
- Richard Scarry (1919–1994, US, ch)
- Igiaba Scego (born 1974, Italy, f/nf)
- Branimir Šćepanović (1937–2020, Yugoslavia/Serbia, f/d)
- Maurice Scève (c. 1501 – c. 1564, France, p)
- Annet Schaap (born 1965, Netherlands, ch)
- Nat Schachner (1895–1955, US, f/nf)
- Adolf Friedrich von Schack (1815–1894, Germany/Italy, p/nf)
- Jakob Schaffner (1875–1944, Switzerland/Germany, f)
- Rafik Schami (born 1946, Syria/Germany, f)
- Peter Schechter (born 1959, Italy/US, f)
- Riana Scheepers (born 1957, S Africa, ch/f/p)
- Paul Scheerbart (1863–1915, Danzig/Germany, f/p)
- Leopold Schefer (1784–1862, Germany, p/f)
- Herman George Scheffauer (1876–1927, US, p/d/nf)
- Joseph Victor von Scheffel (1826–1886, Germany, p/f)
- Georges Schehadé (1905–1989, Lebanon, d/p)
- Jonathan Schell (1943–2014, US, nf)
- Arthur van Schendel (1874–1946, Netherlands, f)
- Bel Schenk (born 1975, Australia, p)
- Johannes Scherr (1817–1886, Germany/Switzerland, f/nf)
- Pam Scheunemann (born 1955, US, ch)
- Moriz Scheyer (1886–1949, Austria, nf)
- Bert Schierbeek (1918–1996, Netherlands, f/nf)
- Stacy Schiff (born 1961, US, nf)
- Emanuel Schikaneder (1751–1812, Germany/Austria, d)
- Friedrich Schiller (1759–1805, Germany, p/nf/d)
- Roland Schimmelpfennig (born 1967, Germany, d)
- Anton Schindler (1795–1864, Austria, nf)
- Baldur von Schirach (1907–1974, Germany, nf)
- Mathilde Schjøtt (1844–1926, Norway, nf)
- Torgeir Schjerven (born 1954, Norway, p/f/ch)
- Johannes Schlaf (1862–1941, Germany, d/f/p)
- Lambert Schlechter (born 1941, Luxembourg, p/f/nf)
- August Wilhelm Schlegel (1767–1845, Germany, p/nf)
- Friedrich Schlegel (1772–1829, Germany, p/nf)
- Johann Elias Schlegel (1719–1749, Germany/Denmark, nf/p)
- Miriam Schlein (1926–2004, US, ch)
- Bernhard Schlink (born 1944, Germany, f/nf)
- Laura Amy Schlitz (born 1955, US, ch)
- Steven J. Schloeder (born 1960, US, nf)
- Eric Schlosser (born 1959, US, nf)
- Anka Schmid (born 1961, Switzerland, d)
- Christoph von Schmid (1768–1854, Germany, ch)
- Annie M. G. Schmidt (1911–1995, Netherlands, ch/p/d)
- Arno Schmidt (1914–1979, Germany, f/nf)
- Stanley Schmidt (born 1944, US, f/nf)
- Michael Schmidt-Salomon (born 1967, Germany, nf/ch)
- Éric-Emmanuel Schmitt (born 1960, France/Belgium, d/f)
- Elke Schmitter (born 1961, Germany, nf/f/p)
- Dennis Schmitz (1937–2019, US, p)
- James H. Schmitz (1911–1974, US, f)
- Abraham Louis Schneiders (1925–2020, Netherlands, f/nf)
- Manfred Schneckenburger (1938–2019, Germany, nf
- Max Schneckenburger (1819–1849, Germany/Switzerland, p)
- Louis Schneider (1805–1878, Germany, nf)
- Peter Schneider (1940–2026, Germany, f/nf)
- Reinhold Schneider (1903–1958, Germany, p/f)
- Robert Schneider (born 1961, Austria, f/d/p)
- Arthur Schnitzler (1862–1931, Austria, d/f/nf)
- Wolfdietrich Schnurre (1920–1989, Germany, f/p/ch)
- Karel Schoeman (1939–2017, S Africa, f/nf)
- Alan Scholefield (1931–2017, S Africa, f)
- Robin Schone (born 1954, US, f)
- Patricia Schonstein (born 1952, S Rhodesia/S Africa, f/p/ch)
- Frans van Schooten (1615–1660, Netherlands, nf)
- Arthur Schopenhauer (1788–1860, Poland-Lithuania/Germany, nf)
- Johanna Schopenhauer (1766–1838, Danzig/Germany, nf/f)
- Constance Wiel Schram (1890–1955, Norway, nf/ch)
- Olive Schreiner (1855–1920, S Africa, f/nf)
- Friedrich Ludwig Schröder (1744–1816, Germany, d)
- Rainer M. Schröder (born 1951, Germany, f/ch)
- Christian Friedrich Daniel Schubart (1739–1791, Germany, p/nf)
- Levin Schücking (1848–1883, Germany, f)
- Levin Ludwig Schücking (1878–1964, Germany, nf)
- Franz Schuh (born 1947, Austria, f/nf)
- Philip Schultz (born 1945, US, p)
- Julianne Schultz (born 1956, Australia, nf)
- Tony Schumacher (1848–1931, Germany, ch)
- James Schuyler (1923–1991, US, p)
- Gustav Schwab (1792–1850, Germany, p/nf)
- Werner Schwab (1958–1994, Austria, d/f)
- György Schwajda (1943–2010, Hungary, d)
- Dietrich Schwanitz (1940–2004, Germany, nf/f)
- Delmore Schwartz (1913–1966, US, p/f)
- José Carlos Schwarz (1949–1977, Guinea-Bissau/Cuba, p)
- Alvin Schwartz (1927–1992, US, nf/ch)
- Liesel Schwarz (living, England, f)
- André Schwarz-Bart (1928–2006, France/Guadeloupe, f)
- Achim Schwarze (born 1958, Germany, nf)
- Annemarie Schwarzenbach (1908–1942, Switzerland, nf)
- Alice Schwarzer (born 1942, Germany, nf)
- Peter Schweizer (born 1964, US, nf)
- Monique Schwitter (born 1972, Switzerland, f/d)
- Kurt Schwitters (1887–1948, Germany/England, nf/p)
- Leonardo Sciascia (1921–1989, Italy, f/nf/d)
- Jon Scieszka (born 1954, US, ch)
- Marianella Sclavi (born 1943, Italy, nf)
- Moacyr Scliar (1937–2011, Brazil, f/ch/nf)
- Sandra Scofield (born 1943, US, f/nf)
- Thomas N. Scortia (1926–1986, US, f)
- Manuel Scorza (1928–1983, Peru, f/p/nf)
- Alexander Scott (c. 1520–1582 or 1583, Scotland, p)
- Alexander Scott (1920–1989, Scotland, p/d/nf)
- Alicia Scott (born 1956, US, f), pseudonym of Lisa Gardner)
- Ann Scott (born 1950, England/US, nf)
- Ann Scott (born 1965, France/England, f)
- Andrew Murray Scott (born 1955, Scotland, f/p/nf)
- Caroline Lucy Scott (1784–1857, England, f/nf)
- Cathy Scott (born 1950s, US, nf)
- Dick Scott (1923–2020, N Zealand, nf)
- F. R. Scott (1899–1985, Canada, p/nf)
- Frederick George Scott (1861–1944, Canada, p)
- Gabriel Scott (1874–1958, Scotland/Norway, p/f/ch)
- Geoffrey Scott (1884–1929, England, nf/p)
- Hardiman Scott (1920–1999, England, nf/f/p)
- Hugh Stowell Scott (1862–1903, England, f), pseudonym Henry Seton Merriman
- J. Michael Scott (born 1941, US, nf)
- John A. Scott (born 1948, England/Australia, p/f/nf)
- Lawrence Scott (born 1943, Trinidad, f/nf)
- Margaret Scott (1928–2014, N Zealand, nf)
- Margaret Scott (1934–2005, England/Australia, p/f/nf)
- Mary Scott (1888–1979, N Zealand, f/d)
- Mary-anne Scott [sic] (living, N Zealand, ch)
- Michael Scott (born 1959, Ireland, f/ch), pseudonym Anna Dillon
- Paul Scott (1920–1978, England, f/d/p)
- Peter J. H. Scott (born 1979, England/US, nf)
- Robyn Scott (born 1981, England/N Zealand, f/nf)
- Rosie Scott (1948–2017, N Zealand/Australia, f/p/nf)
- Sarah Scott (1720–1795, England, f/nf)
- Thomas Scott (1747–1821, England, nf)
- Tom Scott (poet) (1918–1995, Scotland, p/nf)
- Walter Scott (1771–1832, Scotland, f/p/d)
- William Matthew Scott (1893–1964, England, f/ch)
- Gil Scott-Heron (1949–2011, US, p)
- E. J. Scovell (1907–1999, England, p)
- Georges de Scudéry (1601–1667, France, f/d/p)
- Madeleine de Scudéry (1607–1701, France, f/nf)
- George Bazeley Scurfield (1920–1991, England, p/nf)
- Jocelynne Scutt (born 1947, Australia, nf)

== Se–Sf ==
- Jeremy Seabrook (born 1939, England, nf)
- William Bueller Seabrook (1886–1945, US, nf)
- Mary Seacole (1805–1881, Jamaica/England, nf)
- Nicole Sealey (born 1979, US, p)
- Charles Sealsfield (1793–1864, Germany/Switzerland, f), pseudonym of Karl Anton Postl
- Peter Seaton (1942–2010, US, p)
- W. G. Sebald (1944–2001, Germany/England, nf)
- Beppe Sebaste (1959–2026, Italy, f/nf/p)
- Mihail Sebastian (1907–1945, Romania, d/nf/f)
- Anne Sebba (born 1951, England, nf/ch), born Anne Rubinstein
- Leïla Sebbar (born 1941, Algeria/France, f/nf)
- Sebeos (fl. 7th c., Armenia, nf)
- Alice Sebold (born 1963, US, f/nf)
- Barolong Seboni (born 1957, Botswana, p/nf)
- Mac Sebree (1932–2010, US, nf)
- Juan José Sebreli (born 1930, Argentina, nf)
- Władysław Sebyła (1902–1940, Poland, p), Holocaust victim
- Johannes Secundus (1511–1536, Netherlands, p)
- David Sedaris (born 1956, US, nf/d)
- Catharine Sedgwick (1789–1867, US, f/ch)
- Sir Charles Sedley, 5th Baronet (1639–1701, England, d/p)
- Kate Sedley (1926–2022, England, f), pseudonym of Brenda Margaret Lilian Clarke
- Lisa See (born 1955, France, nf/f)
- Laura Vaccaro Seeger (living, US, ch)
- Giorgos Seferis (1900–1971, Ottoman E/Greece, p), pseudonym of Georgios Seferiades
- Ahmed Sefrioui (1915–2004, Morocco, f)
- Anna Seghers (1900–1983, Germany, nf/f)
- Pierre Seghers (1906–1987, France, p)
- Martin Segon (died 1482 or 1485, Serbia/Italy, nf)
- Tomás Segovia (1927–2011, Spain/Mexico, p/nf)
- Mabel Segun (born 1930, Nigeria, p/d/ch)
- Countess of Ségur (1799–1874, Russian E/France, f/ch), born Sofiya Feodorovna Rostopchina
- Benjamin Sehene (born 1959, Rwanda/Uganda, nf/f/d)
- Sei Shōnagon 清少納言, c. 966–1017 or 1025, Japan, f/nf)
- Joseph Brahim Seid (1927–1980, Chad, nf)
- Tor Seidler (born 1952, US, ch)
- Hugh Seidman (born 1940, US, p)
- Åsne Seierstad (born 1970, Norway, nf)
- Rebecca Seiferle (living, US, p)
- Jaroslav Seifert (1901–1986, Austria-Hungary, Czechoslovakia, p/nf)
- Lutz Seiler (born 1963, Germany, p/f)
- Hase Seishū (馳星周, born 1965, Japan, f)
- Lasana M. Sekou (born 1959, Saint-Martin/Sint Maarten, p/f/nf)
- Isidora Sekulić (1877–1958, Austria-Hungary/Yugoslavia, f/nf)
- Maja Herman Sekulić (born 1949, Yugoslavia/US, p/f/nf)
- Dubravka Sekulić (born 1980, Yugoslavia/Serbia, nf)
- Isidora Sekulić (1877–1958, Austria-Hungary/Yugoslavia, nf/f)
- Kobina Sekyi (1892–1956, Gold Coast/Ghana, f/nf)
- Ato Sekyi-Otu (born 1941, Ghana/Canada, nf)
- Taiye Selasi (born 1979, England, f)
- Sahle Selassie (c. 1795–1847, Ethiopia, nf)
- Hubert Selby Jr. (1928–2004, US, f/nf)
- John Selden (1584–1654, England, nf)
- Anthony Seldon (born 1953, England, nf)
- George Selden (1929–1989, US, f/nf/ch)
- Slobodan Selenić (1933–1995, Yugoslavia, f/nf/d)
- Will Self (born 1961, England, f/nf)
- Rudi Šeligo (1935–2004, Yugoslavia/Slovenia, f/d/nf)
- Meša Selimović (1910–1982, Austria-Hungary/Yugoslavia, f/nf)
- Aubrey de Sélincourt (1894–1962, nf)
- Hugh de Sélincourt (1878–1951, nf)
- Milorad Petrović Seljančica (1875–1921, Serbia, p/d)
- J. B. Selkirk (1832–1904, Scotland, p/nf), real name James Brown
- Ågot Gjems Selmer (1857–1926, Norway, nf)
- Habib Selmi (born 1951, Tunisia, f)
- Francis Selormey (1927–1983, Gold Coast/Ghana, f/d)
- Charles Seltman (1886–1957, England, nf)
- Nachman Seltzer (born 1978, US/Israel, f/nf)
- Shyam Selvadurai (born 1965, Sri Lanka/Canada, f)
- Ousmane Sembène (1923–2007, Senegal, d)
- Eugen Semitjov (1923–1987, Sweden, nf/f/ch)
- Johann Salomo Semler (1725–1791, Germany, nf)
- Semonides of Amorgos (fl. 7th c. BCE, Greece, p)
- Edwin Semzaba (fl. 1982–2016, Tanzania, d/f)
- Amartya Sen (born 1933, India, nf)
- Mala Sen (1947–2011, India/England, nf)
- Samar Sen (1916–1987, India, p)
- Jorge de Sena (1919–1978, Portugal/US, p/nf/f)
- Jean Sénac (1926–1973, Algeria, p/nf)
- Othmane Senadjki (1959–2010, Algeria, nf)
- Étienne Pivert de Senancour (1770–1846, France, nf/f)
- Fakir Mohan Senapati (1843–1918, India, f/p)
- Jack Sendak (1923–1995, US, ch)
- Maurice Sendak (1928–2012, US, ch)
- Fama Diagne Sène (born 1969, Senegal, f/p)
- Senge Motomaro (千家元麿, 1888–1948, Japan, p)
- Léopold Sédar Senghor (1906–2001, Senegal/France, p/nf)
- Nassau William Senior (1790–1864, England, nf)
- Olive Senior (born 1941, Jamaica/Canada, p/f/nf)
- Iryna Senyk (1926–2009, Ukraine, p)
- Sipho Sepamla (1932–2007, S Africa, p/n)
- Raivo Seppo (born 1973, Estonia, f)
- Luis Sepúlveda (1949–2020, Chile/Spain, p/f)
- Mahbod Seraji (born 1956, Iran/US, f/nf)
- Valentin Serbu (1934–1994, Romania, f)
- Kate Seredy (1899–1975, Hungary/US, ch)
- Mohamed Serghini (born 1930, Morocco, p/f)
- Abdelhak Serhane (born 1950, Morocco, f)
- Rod Serling (1924–1975, US, d)
- Walter Serner (1889–1942, Austrian E, f/nf), Holocaust victim
- Mongane Wally Serote (born 1944, S Africa, p/f/nf)
- Namwali Serpell (born 1980, Zambia/US, f)
- Ian Serraillier (1912–1994, England, f/p/ch)
- Marcela Serrano (born 1951, Chile, f)
- Miguel Serrano (1917–2009, Chile, nf)
- Eneriko Seruma (born 1944, Uganda, p/f), pseudonym of Henry S. Kimbugwe
- Robert Serumaga (1939–1980, Uganda, d)
- Lee Server (1953–2021, US, nf)
- Robert Service (born 1947, England, nf)
- Robert W. Service (1874–1958, England/France, p/f)
- Vojislav Šešelj (born 1954, Yugoslavia/Serbia, nf)
- Changanti Seshayya (1881–1956, India, nf)
- Henriett Seth F. (born 1980, Hungary, f/d), pseudonym of Henrietta Fajcsák
- Vikram Seth (born 1952, India, f/p)
- Mira Sethi (born 1987, Pakistan, f/nf)
- Anya Seton (1904–1990, US, f)
- Ernest Thompson Seton (1860–1946, US, nf/ch)
- Diane Setterfield (born 1964, England, f)
- Wolfram Setz (1941–2023, Germany, nf)
- Johann Gottfried Seume (1763–1810, Germany/Austrian E, nf)
- Dr. Seuss (1904–1991, US, ch), pseudonym of Theodor Geisel
- Miladin Ševarlić (born 1949, Yugoslavia/Serbia, nf)
- Tim Severin (1940–2020, India/England, nf/f)
- David Severn (1918–2010, England, ch/nf)
- Samuel Sewall (1652–1730, England/New England, nf)
- Anna Seward (1742–1809, England, p)
- Anna Sewell (1820–1878, England, ch)
- Elizabeth Sewell (1919–2001, India/US, p/nf/f)
- Elizabeth Missing Sewell (1815–1906, England, nf)
- William Sewell (1804–1874, England, nf/f)
- Miranda Seymour (born 1948, England, nf/f)
- Carole Seymour-Jones (1943–2015, Wales/England, nf)
- Naha Mint Seyyidi (died 2021, Mauritania, nf)
- Anne Sexton (1928–1974, US, p/nf)
- John W. Sexton (born 1958, England/Ireland, p/f/ch)
- Miranda Seymour (born 1948, England, nf/f)
- Mendele Mocher Sforim (1836–1917, Russian E, f/nf)

== Sh ==
- Sha Menghai (沙孟海, 1900–1992, China, nf)
- Sha Wenhan (沙文漢, 1908–1964, China, nf)
- Shaaban bin Robert (1909–1962, Tanzania, p/nf)
- Jeff Shaara (born 1952, US, f)
- Michael Shaara (1928–1988, US, f)
- Tendai M. Shaba (born 1989, Malawi, p/f/nf)
- Yaakov Shabtai (1934–1981, Palestine/Israel, f/d)
- Maurice Shadbolt (1932–2004, N Zealand, f/nf)
- Ahmed Zaki Abu Shadi (1892–1955, Egypt/US, p/nf)
- Thomas Shadwell (c. 1642–1692, England, p/d)
- Idries Shah (1924–1996, India/England, nf/f/ch)
- Ritula Shah (born 1967, England, nf)
- Smbat Shahaziz (1840–1908, Russian E, nf/p)
- Husne Ara Shahed (1943–2022, Bangladesh, f/nf)
- Muhammad Shahidullah (1885–1969, India/E Pakistan, nf)
- Muhammad Quli Qutb Shah (1565–1612, Goncolda Sultanate, p)
- Riaz Ahmed Gohar Shahi (1941–2000s, India/Pakistan, p/nf)
- Rudra Mohammad Shahidullah (1956–1991, E Pakistan/Bangladesh, p)
- Ruchoma Shain (1914–2013, US, nf)
- Lawrence Shainberg (living, US, nf)
- Nicholas Shakespeare (born 1957, England, f/nf)
- William Shakespeare (1564–1616, England, d/p)
- Abdus Shakur (1941–2013, India/Bangladesh)
- Tupac Shakur (1971–1996, US, p)
- Khairy Shalaby (1938–2011, Egypt, f/nf/d)
- Meir Shalev (born 1948, Israel, f/nf/ch)
- Otep Shamaya (born 1979, US, p/f)
- Ivan Shamiakin (1921–2004, USSR/Belarus, f/d/nf)
- Ahmad Shamlou (1925–2000, Iran, p/d/nf)
- Sepideh Shamlou (born 1968, Iran, f)
- Kamila Shamsie (born 1973, Pakistan/England, f/nf)
- Catherine Shan (born 1952, France, f/nf)
- Shang Yang (沙孟海, c. 390–338 BCE, China, nf)
- Ntozake Shange (1948–2018, US, d/p)
- Shangguan Wan'er (上官婉儿, 664–710, China, p)
- John Patrick Shanley (born 1950, US, d)
- David Shannon (born 1959, US, ch)
- Doris Shannon (1924–2012, US, f), pseudonym E. X. Giroux
- Shao Yong (邵雍, 1011–1077, China, nf/p)
- Jo Shapcott (born 1953, England, p)
- Thomas Shapcott (born 1935, Australia, p/f/d)
- Karl Shapiro (1913–2000, US, p/f/nf)
- Abd al-Qadir ibn Shaqrun (died post-1727/1728, Morocco, nf/p)
- Mahjoub Sharif (1948–2014, Sudan, p)
- Heather J. Sharkey (born 1967, US, nf)
- Michael Sharkey (born 1946, Australia, p)
- Ram Sharan Sharma (1919–2011, India, nf)
- Robin Sharma (born 1965, Canada, nf)
- Sanu Sharma (Nepal/Australia, f)
- Yuyutsu Sharma (born 1960, India/Nepal, p/nf)
- Evelyn Sharp (1869–1965, England, nf/ch)
- Jane Sharp (born c. 1641, England, nf)
- Margery Sharp (1905–1991, England, f/ch/d)
- Samuel Sharp (1709–1778, England, nf)
- Tom Sharpe (1928–2013, England/Spain, f)
- Mark Shasha (born 1961, US, ch)
- William Shatner (born 1931, Canada, f/nf)
- Brenda Shaughnessy (born 1970, US, p)
- Richard S. Shaver (1907–1975, US, f/nf)
- Bob Shaw (1931–1996, N Ireland/England, f/nf)
- Charles Green Shaw (1892–1974, US, f/nf/ch)
- George Bernard Shaw (1856–1950, Ireland/England, d/nf)
- Helen Lilian Shaw (1913–1985, N Zealand, f/p)
- Jane Shaw (born 1963, England, nf)
- Jane Shaw (1910–2000, Scotland, ch)
- Jo Shaw (living, England/Scotland, nf)
- Luci Shaw (born 1928, England/US, p/nf)
- Robert Shaw (1927–1978, England/Ireland, f/d)
- Scott Shaw (born 1958, US, nf)
- Tina Shaw (born 1961, N Zealand, f/ch/nf)
- Ahmed Shawqi (1868–1932, Egypt, d/p/nf)
- Maggie Shayne (born 1962, US, f)
- Miranda Shearer (born 1982, England, nf)
- Laurie Sheck (born 1953, US, p/f)
- Patrick Augustine Sheehan (1852–1913, Ireland, nf/f)
- Charles Sheffield (1935–2002, England/US, f)
- Robert Sheckley (1928–2005, US, f/nf)
- Kirit Shelat (born 1946, India, nf)
- Edward Sheldon (1599–1687, England, d)
- Joss Sheldon (born 1982, England, f/nf)
- Sidney Sheldon (1917–2007, US, d/f)
- Mary Shelley (1797–1851, England, f)
- Percy Bysshe Shelley (1792–1832, England/Italy, p/nf)
- Ibrahim Sheme (born 1968, Nigeria, f/nf)
- Shen Buhai (申不害, c. 400 – c. 337 BCE, China, nf)
- Shen Congwen (沈從文, 1902–1988, China, f/nf)
- Shen Dao (慎到, c. 350 – c. 275 BCE, China, nf)
- Shen Quanqi (沈佺期, c. 650–729, China, p)
- Shen Rong (谌容, 1936–2024, China, f/nf)
- Shen Shanbao (沈善宝, 1808–1862, China, p/nf)
- Dorothy Sherrill (1901–1990, US, ch)
- Shen Shixi (沈石溪, born 1952, China, ch)
- Shen Yinmo (沈尹默, 1883–1971, China, p)
- Shen Yue (沈約, 441–513, China, p/nf)
- Shen Zhou (沈周, 1427–1509, China, nf)
- William Shenstone (1714–1763, England, p/nf)
- Lucius Shepard (1947–2014, US, f)
- Sara Shepard (born 1977, US, f/ch)
- Joel Shepherd (born 1974, Australia, f)
- Nan Shepherd (1893–1981, Scotland, nf/f/p)
- Dick Sheppard (1880–1937, England, nf)
- Barbara Sher (1935–2020, US, nf)
- Bhupi Sherchan (1937–1990, Nepal, p)
- Moyle Sherer (1789–1869, England, nf/f)
- Vamba Sherif (born 1973, Liberia/Netherlands, f)
- T. L. Sherred (1915–1985, US, f)
- R. C. Sherriff (1896–1975, England, d/f)
- Mary Martha Sherwood (1775–1851, England, ch)
- Will Shetterly (born 1955, US, f)
- Taras Shevchenko (1814–1861, Russian E, p)
- Shi Nai'an (施耐庵, c. 1296–1372, China, f)
- Shi Kefa (史可法, 1601–1645, China, nf)
- Shi Shen (石申, fl. c. 4th c. BCE, China, nf)
- Shi Zhecun (施蟄存, 1905–2003, China, nf/f/p)
- Ryōtarō Shiba (司馬遼太郎, 1923–1996, Japan, f/nf)
- Adania Shibli (born 1974, Palestine, f/nf)
- Tatsuhiko Shibusawa (澁澤龍彦, 1928–1987, Japan, f/nf)
- Shide (拾得, fl. 9th c., China, p)
- Carol Shields (1935–2003, US/Canada, f)
- Mitsuko Shiga (四賀光子, 1885–1976, Japan, p)
- Naoya Shiga (志賀直哉, 1883–1971, Japan, f)
- Shiing-Shen Chern (陳省身, 1911–2004, China, nf/p)
- Masaoka Shiki (正岡子規, 1867–1902, Japan, p/nf)
- Arthur Richard Shilleto (1848–1894, England, nf)
- Richard Shilleto (1809–1876, England, nf)
- Masahiko Shimada (島田雅彦, born 1961, Japan, f/p)
- Kensaku Shimaki (島木健作, 1903–1945, Japan, f)
- Toshio Shimao (島尾敏雄, 1917–1986, Japan, f)
- Tōson Shimazaki (島崎藤村, 1872–1943, Japan, p/f)
- Motoyoshi Shimizu (清水基吉, 1918–2008, Japan, f/p)
- Shimizu Shikin (清水紫琴, 1868–1933, Japan, nf)
- Yoshinori Shimizu (清水義範, born 1947, Japan, f/ch)
- Christopher R. Shimmin (1870–1933, Isle of Man, d)
- Thomas Shimmin (1800 – c. 1876/1879, Isle of Man, p)
- Samuel Shimon (born 1956, Iraq, f)
- Pedro Shimose (born 1940, Bolivia/Spain, p/nf)
- Ba Shin (1914–1970, Burma, nf)
- Hsu Shin (1932–2009, Burma/Myanmar, nf), pseudonym of Myo Thant
- Shing-Tung Yau (丘成桐, born 1949, China, nf)
- Irma Shiolashvili (born 1974, USSR/Georgia, p/nf)
- Nanami Shiono (塩野七生, born 1937, Japan, nf/f)
- Gary Shipman (born 1966, US, ch)
- Rhoda Shipman (born 1968, US, ch)
- Anania Shirakatsi (fl. 7th c., Armenia, nf)
- Shizu Shiraki (素木しづ, 1895–1918, Japan, f)
- Hovhannes Shiraz (1914–1984, Russian E/Soviet Union, p)
- Saadi Shirazi (1210–1291 or 1292, Iran, p/f)
- James Shirley (1596–1666, England, d)
- John Shirley (born 1953, US, f/nf/d)
- Reza Shirmarz (born 1974, Iran/Greece, d/nf)
- Alexander Shirvanzade (1858–1935, Armenia/Soviet Union, d/f)
- Avraham Shlonsky (1900–1973, Russian E/Israel, p)
- Izya Shlosberg (born 1950, Soviet Union/US, f/p)
- Dora Adele Shoemaker (1873–1962, US, p/f)
- Lola Shoneyin (born 1974, Nigeria, p/f/ch)
- Junzō Shōno (庄野潤三, 1921–2009, Japan, f/nf)
- Joseph Henry Shorthouse (1834–1903, England, f)
- Rupert Shortt (living, England, nf)
- Fredegond Shove (1889–1949, England, p)
- Norman Shrapnel (1912–2004, England, nf)
- Siddhicharan Shrestha (1912–1992, Nepal, p)
- Ilya Shtemler (1933–2022, USSR/Russia, f/nf)
- Shu Ting (舒婷, born 1952, China, p), pseudonym of Gong Peiyu (龚佩瑜)
- Ana María Shua (born 1951, Argentina, f)
- Ibn Shuayb (died 1349, Morocco/Tunisia, nf/p)
- Ishtiyaq Shukri (living, S Africa/England, f)
- Mark Shulman (born 1962, US, ch)
- Bruno Schulz (1892–1942, Poland, f), Holocaust victim
- William Shunn (born 1967, US, f/nf)
- Semyon Shurtakov (1918–2014, Russia, ch/f)
- Neal Shusterman (born 1962, US, f/nf/ch)
- Nevil Shute (1899–1960, England/Australia, f), pseudonym of Nevil Shute Norway
- Penelope Shuttle (born 1947, England, p)
- Tin Shwe (1936–2000, Burma/Myanmar, f/nf)

== Si ==
- Siamanto (1878–1915, Ottoman E, p), birth name Atom Yarjanian
- Mohamed Sibari (1945–2013, Morocco, p/f)
- Gareth Sibson (born 1977, England, f/nf)
- Anja Sicking (born 1965, Netherlands, f)
- Bapsi Sidhwa (born 1938, Pakistan/US, f/nf)
- Mary Sidney (1561–1621, England, p/d), Countess of Pembroke, married name Herbert
- Philip Sidney (1554–1586, England, p/nf)
- Samuel Sidney (1813–1883, England, nf)
- Friedrich Sieburg (1893–1964, Germany, nf)
- Louisa Siefert (1845–1877, France, p)
- Eli Siegel (1902–1978, Russian E/US, p/nf)
- Robert Siegel (1939–2012, US, p/f/ch)
- Mary Ann Sieghart (born 1961, England, nf)
- Henryk Sienkiewicz (1846–1916, Russian E/Poland, f)
- Wacław Sieroszewski (1858–1945, Russian E/Poland, f/nf)
- Monde Sifuniso (born 1944, Zambia, f/nf)
- Fatou Niang Siga (1932–2022, Senegal, nf)
- Hannes Sigfússon (1922–1997, Iceland, p/f/nf)
- Steinvör Sighvatsdóttir (early 13th c. – 1271, Iceland, p)
- Marjorie Lynette Sigley (1928–1997, England, ch)
- Fríða Á. Sigurðardóttir (1940–2010, Iceland, f)
- Jakobína Sigurðardóttir (1918–1994, Iceland, ch/f/p)
- Lilja Sigurðardóttir (born 1972, Iceland, f/d)
- Ragna Sigurðardóttir (born 1962, Iceland, f/p)
- Steinunn Sigurðardóttir (born 1950, Iceland, p/f)
- Yrsa Sigurðardóttir (born 1963, Iceland, f/ch)
- Birgir Sigurðsson (1937–2019, Iceland, p/d/f)
- Jóhann Gunnar Sigurðsson (1882–1906, Iceland, p)
- Ófeigur Sigurðsson (born 1975, Iceland, p/f)
- Ólafur Jóhann Sigurðsson (1918–1988, Iceland, f/p/ch)
- Jóhann Sigurjónsson (1880–1919, Iceland, d/p)
- Sigurður Sigurjónsson (born 1955, Iceland, d)
- Rogelio R. Sikat (1940–1997, Philippines, f/d)
- Abdulai Silá (born 1958, Guinea-Bissau, f)
- Charles E. Silberman (1925–2011, US, nf)
- Una Lucy Silberrad (1872–1955, England, f/nf)
- August Silberstein (1827–1900, Austria-Hungary, f/p)
- Malla Silfverstolpe (1782–1861, Sweden, nf)
- Dennis Silk (1931–2019, England, nf)
- Jon Silkin (1930–1997, England, p)
- Frans Eemil Sillanpää (1888–1964, Finland, f)
- Ron Silliman (born 1946, US, p/nf)
- Alan Sillitoe (1928–2010, England, f/nf/ch)
- Ignazio Silone (1900–1978, Italy/Switzerland, f/nf/d)
- Elder Siluan (fl. 14th c., Serbia, f)
- Agostinho da Silva (1906–1994, Portugal, nf)
- António José da Silva (1705–1739, Brazil/Portugal, d)
- Baltasar Lopes da Silva (1907–1989, Cape Verde/Portugal, p/f/nf)
- Daniel Silva (born 1960, US, f)
- José Asunción Silva (1865–1896, Colombo, p)
- Medardo Ángel Silva (1898–1919, Ecuador, p)
- Miguel Otero Silva (1908–1985, Venezuela, f/p/nf)
- Víctor Domingo Silva (1882–1960, Chile, p/nf/d)
- Burton Silver (born 1945, N Zealand, f/nf)
- Adam Silvera (born 1990, US, f/ch)
- Makeda Silvera (born 1955, Jamaica/Canada, f/nf)
- Robert Silverberg (born 1935, US, f)
- Shel Silverstein (1930–1999, US, nf/p/d)
- Carol Ann Sima (born 1956, US, f)
- Sima Guang (司馬光, 1019–1086, China, nf)
- Sima Qian (司馬遷, c. 145 – c. 86 BCE, China, nf)
- Sima Xiangru (司馬相如, c. 179–117 BCE, China, p)
- Sima Zhen (司馬貞, 679–732, China, nf)
- Clifford D. Simak (1904–1988, US, f)
- Elizabeth Simcoe (1762–1850, England/Canada, nf)
- Georges Simenon (1903–1989, Belgium, f)
- Simeon Simev (born 1949, Yugoslavia/N Macedonia, p/nf)
- Charles Simic (1938–2023, Yugoslavia/US, p/nf)
- Johannes Mario Simmel (1924–2009, Austria/Switzerland, f/nf/d)
- Josias Simmler (1530–1576, Switzerland, nf)
- Dan Simmons (1948–2026, US, f)
- Dawn Langley Simmons (1922–2020, England, nf), born Gordon Langley Hall
- Jack Simmons (1915–2000, England, nf)
- Brendan Simms (born 1967, Ireland/England, nf)
- David J. Simms (1933–2018, India/Ireland, nf)
- George Simms (1910–1991, Ireland, nf)
- Alcides Sakala Simões (born 1953, Angola, nf)
- Claude Simon (1913–2005, Madagascar/France, f)
- Francesca Simon (born 1955, US/England, ch)
- Richard Simon (1638–1712, France, nf)
- Seymour Simon (born 1931, US, ch)
- Ólafur Haukur Símonarson (born 1947, Iceland, d/f)
- Simonides of Ceos (555–468 BCE, Greece, p)
- Ljubodrag Simonović (born 1949, Yugoslavia/Serbia, nf)
- Les Simons (born 1952, US, f), pseudonym of Kathryn Ptacek
- Arend Fokke Simonsz (1755–1812, Netherlands, nf)
- Ljubomir Simović (born 1935, Yugoslavia/Serbia, p/f/d)
- Dorothy Simpson (1933–2020, Wales/England, f)
- Helen Simpson (born 1957, England, f)
- Helen de Guerry Simpson (1897–1940, Australia/England, f/nf/d)
- Louis Simpson (1923–2012, Jamaica/US, p)
- Matt Simpson (1936–2009, England, p/nf)
- R. A. Simpson (1929–2002, Australia, p)
- Karl Joseph Simrock (1802–1876, Germany, p/nf)
- Hourya Benis Sinaceur (born 1940, Morocco, nf)
- Mohammed Allal Sinaceur (born 1941, Morocco, nf)
- Daniel Sinapius-Horčička (1640–1688, Austria-Hungary, nf/p/d)
- Bennie Lee Sinclair (1939–2000, US, p/f)
- Catherine Sinclair (1800–1864, Scotland/England, f/ch)
- Clive Sinclair (1948–2018, England, f)
- Keith Sinclair (1922–1993, N Zealand, p/nf)
- Lester Basil Sinclair (1894–1974, Australia, ch), pseudonym John Mystery
- May Sinclair (1863–1946, England, f/p)
- Rebecca Sinclair (living, US, f)
- Tim Sinclair (born 1972, Australia, f/ch/p)
- Burns Singer (1928–1964, Scotland/US, p/nf)
- Isaac Bashevis Singer (1903–1991, Russian E/US, f/ch)
- Israel Joshua Singer (1893–1944, Poland/US, f)
- Marilyn Singer (born 1948, US, ch/p)
- Guru Gobind Singh (1666–1708, India, p/nf)
- Jaspreet Singh (born 1969, India/Canada, f/d/nf)
- Nalini Singh (born 1977, N Zealand, f)
- Sally Singhateh (born 1977, Gambia, p/f)
- Sarah Singleton (born 1966, England, f/ch)
- Amara Sinha (fl. c. 375 CE), Sanskrit grammarian and poet
- Indra Sinha (born 1950, India/France, nf/f)
- Johanna Sinisalo (born 1958, Finland, f/nf)
- Ervin Šinko (1898–1967, Austria-Hungary/Yugoslavia, p)
- Gilbert Sinoué (born 1947, Egypt/France, f/nf)
- Binwell Sinyangwe (born 1956, Zambia, f)
- Curt Siodmak (1902–2000, Germany/US, f/d)
- Ali Siqli (born 1932, Morocco, ch/d)
- Ismail Hossain Siraji (1880–1931, India, p/f/nf)
- Ivo Siromahov (born 1971, Bulgaria, f/d)
- Abderrahmane Sissako (born 1961, Mauritania/Mali, d)
- Lemn Sissay (born 1967, England, p)
- Fily Dabo Sissoko (1900–1964, French Sudan/Mali, nf/f/p)
- C. H. Sisson (1914–2003, England, p/f/nf)
- Johann Sithmann (1602–1666, Germany, nf)
- Ndabaningi Sithole (1920–2000, S Rhodesia/Zimbabwe, nf)
- Edith Sitwell (1887–1964, England, p/nf)
- Osbert Sitwell (1892–1969, England, f/nf)
- Sacheverell Sitwell (1897–1988, England, nf/p)
- Arlen Siu (1955–1975, Nicaragua, p/nf)
- Yum-Tong Siu (蕭蔭堂, born 1943, China/US, nf)
- Solfrid Sivertsen (born 1947, Norway, p/f/ch)
- Per Sivle (1857–1904, Norway, p/f/nf)
- Susan Sizemore (1951–2020, US, f)

== Sj–Sn ==
- Þórðr Sjáreksson (fl. 11th c. CE, Iceland, p)
- Sjón (born 1962, Iceland, p/f), pseudonym of Sigurjón Birgir Sigurðsson
- Maj Sjöwall (1935–2020, Sweden, f)
- Fredrik Skagen (1936–2017, Norway, f/ch/d)
- Kaj Skagen (born 1949, Norway, f/nf)
- Sarita Skagnes (born 1969, India/Norway, nf)
- Bersi Skáldtorfuson (fl. c. 1000 CE, Iceland, p)
- Faouzi Skali (born 1953, Morocco, nf)
- Egill Skallagrímsson (c. 904 – c. 995, Iceland, p)
- Igor Škamperle (born 1962, Yugoslavia/Slovenia, nf/f)
- Antonio Skármeta (born 1940, Chile, f)
- Þórarinn Skeggjason (fl. 11th c. CE, Iceland, p)
- John Skelton (c. 1463–1529, England, p)
- Antanas Škėma (1910–1961, Lithuania/US, f/d)
- Sasha Skenderija (born 1968, Yugoslavia/Czech R, p)
- Staka Skenderova (1831–1891, Ottoman E/Austria-Hungary, nf)
- Jovan Skerlić (1877–1914, Serbia, nf)
- Slobodan Škerović (born 1954, Yugoslavia/Serbia, nf)
- Ronald Skirth (1897–1977, England, nf)
- Einar Skjæraasen (1900–1966, Norway, p/nf)
- Ed Skoog (born 1971, US, p)
- Rebecca Skloot (born 1972, US, nf)
- Sofija Škorić (1937–2022, Yugoslavia/Canada, nf)
- Jan Stanisław Skorupski (born 1938, Poland, p/f/nf)
- Zoë Skoulding (born 1967, England/Wales, p/nf)
- John Skoyles (living, England, nf)
- Amalie Skram (1846–1905, Norway, f)
- Ragnvald Skrede (1904–1983, Norway, p/nf)
- Peter Skrzynecki (born 1945, Australia, p/f/nf)
- Andrej E. Skubic (born 1967, Yugoslavia/Slovenia, f/d)
- Einarr Skúlason (c. 1100 – post-1159, Iceland, p)
- Christina Skye (1950–2018, US, f), pseudonym of Roberta Helmer
- Arthur Slade (born 1967, Canada, f/ch)
- John Sladek (1937–2000, US, f)
- J. Slauerhoff (1898–1936, Netherlands, n/f)
- Karin Slaughter (born 1971, US, f)
- Tracey Slaughter (born 1972, N Zealand, f/p)
- Svetoslav Slavchev (1926–2016, Bulgaria, f/nf)
- Pencho Slaveykov (1866–1912, Bulgaria, p)
- Petko Slaveykov (1827–1895, Bulgaria, p/nf)
- Ioan Slavici (1848–1925, Austria-Hungary/Romania, f/nf)
- Eleanor Sleath (1770–1847, England, f)
- William Sleator (1945–2011, US, f/ch)
- Eugene Sledge (1923–2001, US, nf)
- Barbara Sleigh (1906–1982, England, p/nf)
- Michael Slepian (1987, US, nf)
- Kenneth Slessor (1901–1971, Australia, p)
- Djoko Slijepčević (1907–1993, Habsburg E/Germany, nf)
- Sam Sloan (born 1944, US, nf)
- Eric Sloane (1905–1985, US, nf)
- Dušan Slobodník (1927–2001, Czechoslovakia/Slovakia, nf)
- Anton Martin Slomšek (1800–1862, Austria-Hungary, nf/p)
- Joan Slonczewski (born 1956, US, f)
- Antoni Słonimski (1895–1976, Poland, p/nf/d)
- Gillian Slovo (born 1952, S Africa/England, f/d/nf)
- Juliusz Słowacki (1809–1949, Poland, p)
- René-François de Sluse (1622–1685, Spanish Netherlands, nf)
- Boris Slutsky (1919–1986, USSR, p)
- Anna Smaill (born 1979, N Zealand, p/f)
- Ljiljana Smajlović (born 1956, Yugoslavia/Bosnia and Herzegovina, nf)
- Adam Small (1936–2016, S Africa, nf/p)
- Bertrice Small (1937–2015, US, f)
- Örvar Þóreyjarson Smárason (born 1977, Iceland, p/f)
- Christopher Smart (1722–1771, England, p/nf)
- Henry Hawley Smart (1833–1893, England, f)
- Dorothea Smartt (born 1963, England, p)
- Goce Smilevski (born 1975, Yugoslavia/N Macedonia, f)
- Hristo Smirnenski (1898–1923, Bulgaria, p/nf)
- Adam Smith (1723–1790, Scotland, nf)
- Alexander McCall Smith (born 1948, S Rhodesia/Scotland, nf/f)
- Anthony Neil Smith (living, US, f)
- Barbara Dawson Smith (living, US, f)
- Bruce Smith (born 1946, US, p)
- Charles Saumarez Smith (born 1954, England, nf)
- Charlotte Fell Smith (1851–1937, England, nf)
- Charlotte Smith (1749–1806, England, p/f)
- Clark Ashton Smith (1893–1961, US, p/f)
- Cordwainer Smith (1913–1966, US, f/nf), pseudonym of Paul M. A. Lindebarger
- Dodie Smith (1896–1990, England, f/ch)
- E. E. Smith (1890–1965, US, f), Edward E. "Doc" Smith
- Elizabeth Smith (1776–1806, England, nf)
- Emma Smith (1923–2018, England, f/ch/nf)
- George O. Smith (1911–1981, US, f)
- Georgina Castle Smith (1845–1933, England, ch)
- Jean Edward Smith (1932–2019, US, nf)
- Jeff Smith (born 1960, US, f)
- Jonathan Smith (born 1942, England, f/d)
- Karen Rose Smith (living, US, f)
- L. J. Smith (c. 1817–1887, US, f/ch)
- L. Neil Smith (1946–2021, US, f/nf)
- Margaret Smith (born 1958, US, f/p/nf)
- Mark Smith (1935–2022, US, f)
- Martin Ferguson Smith (born 1940, England/Scotland, nf)
- Mary Bell Smith (1818-1894, US, f)
- Patti Smith (born 1946, US, p)
- Robert Smith (1932–2010, US, nf)
- Robert Farrell Smith (born 1970, US, ch), pseudonym Obert Skye
- Roland Smith (born 1951, US, ch)
- Russell Smith (born 1963, S Africa/Canada, f/nf)
- Stevie Smith (1902–1971, England, p/n)
- Sydney Smith (1771–1845, England, nf)
- Sydney Goodsir Smith (1915–1975, N Zealand/Scotland, p/d/f)
- Tracy K. Smith (born 1972, US, p/nf)
- Vivian Smith (born 1933, Australia, p/nf)
- Wilbur Smith (1933–2021, N Rhodesia/S Africa, f)
- William Jay Smith (1918–2015, US, p)
- Zadie Smith (born 1975, England, f/d/nf)
- Elizabeth Smither (born 1941, N Zealand, p/f)
- Dominik Smole (1929–1992, Yugoslavia/Slovenia, f/d)
- Tobias Smollett (1721–1771, Scotland/England, f/p)
- Barbara Smucker (1915–2003, US/Canada, ch)
- Juhan Smuul (1922–1971, Estonia, f/nf)
- Frank Smythe (1900–1949, England, nf)
- Pat Smythe (1928–1996, England, nf/ch)
- Caroline Snedeker (1871–1956, US, ch)
- O. F. Snelling (1916–2001, England, nf)
- Lemony Snicket (born 1970, US, ch), pen name of Daniel Handler
- W. D. Snodgrass (1926–2009, US, p), pseudonym S. S. Gardons
- Jože Snoj (1934–2021, Yugoslavia/Slovenia, p/f/nf)
- Ernir Kristján Snorrason (1944–1912, Iceland, nf/f/p)
- Oddr Snorrason (fl. 12th c., Iceland, nf)
- C. P. Snow (1905–1980, England, f/nf)
- Jack Snow (1907–1956, US, f)
- Gary Snyder (born 1930, US, p/nf)
- Laura J. Snyder (born 1964, US, nf)
- Laurel Snyder (born 1974, US, ch)
- Lucy A. Snyder (born 1971, US, f/nf)
- Zilpha Keatley Snyder (1927–2014, US, ch)

== So–Sr ==
- Dava Sobel (born 1947, US, nf)
- Donald J. Sobol (1924–2012, US, ch)
- Joseph Sobran (1946–2010, US, nf)
- Ousmane Diop Socé (1911–1973, Senegal, f)
- Socrates (c. 470–399 BCE, Greece, nf)
- Kirsten Sødal (1935–2022, Norway, ch)
- Hjalmar Söderberg (1869–1941, Sweden, f/d/p)
- Edith Södergran (1892–1923, Russian E/Soviet Union, p)
- Ahmed Sofa (1943–2001, India/Bangladesh, f/nf)
- Zulu Sofola (1935–1995, Nigeria, d)
- Sōgi (宗祇, 1421–1502, Japan, p)
- Jerry Sohl (1913–2002, US, d/f)
- Ružica Sokić (1934–2013, Yugoslavia/Serbia, f)
- Bergr Sokkason (fl. early 14th c., Iceland, f/nf)
- Alexandra Sokoloff (living, US, f/d)
- Pavle Solarić (1779–1821, Habsburg E, nf/p)
- Kristin Solberg (born 1982, Norway, nf)
- Edmundo Paz Soldán (born 1967, Bolivia/US, f/nf)
- Mario Soldati (1906–1999, Italy, f/nf)
- Sóley (born 1987, Iceland, p), pseudonym of Sóley Stefánsdóttir
- Laila Soliman (born 1981, Egypt, d)
- Walid Soliman (born 1975, Tunisia, f)
- Dumitru Solomon (1932–2003, Romania, nf/d)
- Laura Solomon (1974–2019, N Zealand, f/d/p)
- Solon (c. 630 – c. 560 BCE, Greece, nf/p)
- Dag Solstad (1941–2025, Norway, f/d)
- Asef Soltanzadeh (born 1964, Afghanistan/Denmark, f/d)
- David Solway (born 1941, Canada, p/nf)
- Aleksandr Solzhenitsyn (1918–2008, Soviet Union/Russia, f/nf)
- Malidoma Patrice Somé (1956–2021, Burkina Faso/US, nf)
- Armonía Somers (1914–1994, Uruguay, f)
- Suzanne Somers (born 1946, US, nf)
- William Somervile (1675–1742, England, p)
- Angela Sommer-Bodenburg (born 1948, Germany, ch)
- Justin Somper (living, England, ch)
- Remi Sonaiya (born 1955, Nigeria, nf)
- Monica Sone (1919–2011, US, nf)
- Song Yingxing (宋應星, 1587–1666, China, nf)
- Song Ci (宋慈, 1186–1249, China, nf)
- Song Yu (宋玉, fl. 298–263 BCE, China, p)
- Song Zhiwen (宋之問, c. 660–712, China, p)
- Joseph von Sonnenfels (1732–1817, Austria/Germany, f)
- Ayako Sono (曽野綾子, Japan, f/nf)
- Kin'yuki Sonoike (園池公致, 1886–1974, Japan, f)
- Alastair Sooke (born 1981, England, nf)
- Eileen Louise Soper (1900–1989, N Zealand, nf)
- Sophocles (c. 479–476 – c. 406–405, BCE, Greece, d)
- Sophronius of Vratsa (1739 – post-1813, Bulgaria/Romania, nf)
- Aco Šopov (1923–1982, Yugoslavia, p)
- Charles Sorel, sieur de Souvigny (c. 1602–1674, France, f/nf)
- Edward Sorensen (1869–1939, Australia, f/p)
- Tracy Sorensen (1963–2025, Australia, f)
- Virginia Sorensen (1912–1991, US, f/ch)
- Marin Sorescu (1936–1996, Romania, p/d/f)
- Thor Sørheim (born 1949, Norway, p)
- Charles Sorley (1895–1915, Scotland/France, p)
- Osvaldo Soriano (1943–1997, Argentina, nf)
- Pierre De Sornay (1876–1968, Mauritius, nf)
- Vladimir Sorokin (born 1955, Russia, f/d)
- Dominique Sorrente (born 1953, France, p)
- Roberto Sosa (1930–2011, Honduras, p/nf)
- Gary Soto (born 1952, Mexico/US, p/f/nf)
- Ahdaf Soueif (born 1950, Egypt, f/nf)
- Maris Soule (born 1939, US, f)
- Philippe Soupault (1897–1990, France, p/f/nf)
- Henrique Teixeira de Sousa (1919–2006, Cape Verde/Portugal, f/nf)
- Cruz e Sousa (1861–1898, Brazil, p/nf)
- Noémia de Sousa (1926–2002, Mozambique, p), pseudonym Vera Micaia
- Sousândrade (1833–1902, Brazil, p), pseudonym of Joaquim de Sousa Andrade
- Michael Soussan (born 1973, Denmark/US, nf)
- Mohammed al-Mokhtar Soussi (1900–1963, Morocco, nf)
- William Soutar (1898–1943, Scotland, p/nf)
- Ivan Southall (1921–2008, Australia, f/nf/ch)
- Terry Southern (1924–1995, US, f/nf/d)
- Caroline Anne Southey (1786–1864, England, p)
- Robert Southey (1774–1843, England, p/f)
- Robert Southwell (c. 1561–1595, England, p)
- Stephen Southwold (1887–1964, England, f/ch), pseudonym of Stephen Henry Critten
- Fatou Ndiaye Sow (1937–2004, Senegal, ch/nf)
- Mansour El Souwaim (born 1970, Sudan, f)
- Márcio Souza (1946–2024, Brazil, f/d/nf)
- Bode Sowande (born 1948, Nigeria, d/nf)
- Carl Erik Soya (1896–1983, Denmark, d/f/p)
- Jura Soyfer (1912–1939, Russian E/Austria, nf), Holocaust victim
- Wole Soyinka (born 1934, Nigeria, d/f/p)
- Jon Spaihts (born 1970, US, d/f)
- Nancy Spain (1917–1964, England, f/nf)
- Svetlana Spajić (born 1971, Yugoslavia/Serbia, nf)
- Tom Spanbauer (1946–2024, US, f)
- Muriel Spark (1918–2006, Scotland/England, f/nf/p)
- Nicholas Sparks (born 1965, US, f/nf)
- Walter Shaw Sparrow (1862–1940, Wales/England, nf)
- Thomas Henry Sparshott (1841–1927, England, East Africa, nf)
- Zoran Spasojević (born 1949, Yugoslavia/Serbia, p/f/d)
- Elizabeth George Speare (1908–1994, US, ch)
- William Speechly (1735–1819, England, nf)
- Albert Speer (1905–1981, Germany, nf)
- Alan Spence (born 1947, Scotland, p/d/f)
- Catherine Helen Spence (1825–1910, Scotland/Australia, nf)
- Eleanor Spence (1928–2008, Australia, f/ch)
- E. Lee Spence (born 1947, Germany/US, nf), pseudonym Charles King
- Bernard Spencer (1909–1963, England/Austria, p)
- LaVyrle Spencer (born 1943, US, f)
- Robert Spencer (born 1962, US, nf)
- Thomas Edward Spencer (1845–1911, England/Australia, f/p)
- Lady Henrietta Spencer-Churchill (born 1958, England, nf)
- Dale Spender (1943–2023, Australia, nf)
- Emily Spender (1841–1922, England, f)
- Harold Spender (1864–1926, England, nf)
- J. A. Spender (1862–1942, England, nf)
- Jean Spender (1901–1970, Australia, f)
- Lillian Spender (1835–1895, England, nf/f)
- Stephen Spender (1909–1995, England, p/f/nf)
- Edmund Spenser (1552/1553–1599, England, p)
- Manès Sperber (1905–1984, Austria/France, f/nf)
- Armstrong Sperry (1897–1976, US, ch)
- Hendrik Laurenszoon Spiegel (1549–1612, Netherlands, nf/d)
- Nadja Spiegelman (born 1987, US, nf/ch)
- Hilde Spiel (1911–1990, Austria/England, f/nf)
- Friedrich Spielhagen (1829–1911, Germany, f/nf)
- Peter Spier (1927–2017, Netherlands/US, ch)
- Jerry Spinelli (born 1941, US, ch)
- Baruch Spinoza (1632–1677, Dutch Republic, nf)
- Norman Spinrad (born 1940, US, f/nf)
- André Spire (1868–1966, France, p/nf)
- Jela Spiridonović-Savić (1890–1974, Serbia/Yugoslavia, p)
- György Spiró (born 1946, d/f/nf)
- Carl Spitteler (1845–1924, Switzerland, p)
- William Archibald Spooner (1844–1930, England, nf)
- Howard Spring (1889–1965, Wales/England, f/ch)
- F. Springer (1932–2011, Netherlands, f), pseudonym of Carel Jan Schneider
- Nancy Springer (born 1948, US, f/ch)
- Sarah Springman (born 1956, England, nf)
- Francis Spufford (born 1964, England, nf/f)
- Margaret Spufford (1935–2014, England, nf)
- Peter Spufford (1934–2015, England, nf)
- Caroline Spurgeon (1869–1942, India, US, nf)
- E. C. Spykman (1896–1965, US, ch)
- Johanna Spyri (1827–1901, Switzerland, f/ch)
- Biljana Srbljanović (born 1970, Yugoslavia/Serbia, d)
- Srđan Srdić (born 1977, Yugoslavia/Serbia, f/nf)
- Stojan Srdić (born 1950, Yugoslavia/Serbia, d/f)
- Stevan Sremac (1855–1906, Austrian E/Serbia, nf)
- Srđan Srdić (born 1977, Yugoslavia/Serbia, f/nf)
- Ahmed Harrak Srifi (died 1925, Morocco, nf)
- Balys Sruoga (1896–1947, Lithuania/Soviet Union, p/d/nf)

== St ==
- Cynthia Morgan St. John (1852–1919, US, p/nf)
- Patricia St. John (1919–1993, England, f/nf)
- Gunnar Staalesen (born 1947, Norway, f/d)
- Edward Stachura (1937–1979, Poland, p/f/nf)
- Arnold Stadler (born 1954, Germany, f/nf/p)
- Matthew Stadler (born 1959, US, f/nf)
- Rebecca St. James (born 1977, Australia, nf)
- Michael A. Stackpole (born 1957, US, f)
- Germaine de Staël (1766–1817, France, nf)
- Leopold Staff (1878–1957, Austria-Hungary/Poland, p)
- Ian Stafford (living, England, nf)
- Kim Stafford (born 1949, US, p/nf)
- William Stafford (1914–1993, US, p/nf/f)
- Jason Staggie (born 1980s, S Africa, f)
- Erik Johan Stagnelius (1793–1823, Sweden, p/d)
- A. E. Stallings (born 1968, US, p)
- Jon Stallworthy (1935–2014, England, nf/p)
- Georgi Stamatov (1869–1942, Russian E/Bulgaria, f)
- Albena Stambolova (born 1957, Bulgaria, nf/f)
- Peter Stamm (born 1963, Switzerland, f)
- Zaharia Stancu (1902–1974, Romania, nf/f/p)
- Nichita Stănescu (1933–1983, Romania, p/nf)
- Emiliyan Stanev (1907–1979, Bulgaria, f)
- Ann Stanford (1916–1987, US, p/d/nf)
- Louisa Stanhope (fl. 1806–1827, England, f)
- Philip Stanhope, 5th Earl Stanhope (1805–1875, England, nf)
- Vladimir Stanimirović (1881–1956, Yugoslavia/Serbia, p/d)
- Saša Stanišić (born 1978, Germany, f/ch/nf)
- Anna Stanisławska (1651–1701, Poland, p)
- Borisav Stanković (1876–1927, Ottoman E/Yugoslavia, f)
- Dejan Tiago Stankovic (born 1965, Yugoslavia/Portugal, f)
- Stanoje Stanojević (1874–1937, Serbia/Yugoslavia, nf)
- Andy Stanton (born 1973, England, ch)
- Olaf Stapledon (1886–1950, England, nf/f)
- Petar Stapov (1910–1992, Bulgaria, f)
- George Starbuck (1931–1996, US, p)
- Walter Starkie (1894–1976, Ireland/Spain, nf)
- Luan Starova (1941–2022, Albania/N Macedonia, f)
- Christopher Stasheff (1944–2018, US, f)
- Andrzej Stasiuk (born 1960, Poland, nf)
- Nicolette Stasko (born 1950, US/Australia, p/f/nf)
- Statius (c. 45 – c. 96 CE, Roman E, p)
- Kjersti Løken Stavrum (born 1969, Norway, nf)
- C. K. Stead (born 1932, N Zealand, f/p/nf)
- Christina Stead (1902–1983, Australia, f)
- Catherine Steadman (born 1987, England, f)
- Betsey Ann Stearns (1830–1914, US, nf)
- Henry Stebbing (1799–1883, England, nf/p)
- Stesichorus (c. 630–555 BCE, Greece, p)
- Danielle Steel (born 1947, US, f)
- Flora Annie Steel (1847–1929, England, f/nf)
- Allen Steele (born 1958, US, f)
- Jessica Steele (1933–2020, England, f)
- Peter Steele (1939–2012, Australia, p/nf)
- Thorvald Steen (born 1954, Norway, f/d/ch)
- Willem Steenkamp (born 1940, S Africa, nf)
- Dugald Steer (born 1965, England, ch)
- Josef Stefan (1835–1893, Austrian E/Austria-Hungary, nf/p)
- Mirjana Stefanović (1939–2021, Yugoslavia/Serbia, p/ch)
- Zoran Stefanović (born 1969, Yugoslavia/Serbia, d/f)
- Erla Stefánsdóttir (1935–2015, Iceland, nf)
- Davíð Stefánsson (1895–1964, Iceland, p/f)
- Hermann Stefánsson (born 1968, Iceland, f/p)
- Jón Kalman Stefánsson (born 1963, Iceland, f/p)
- Albert Steffen (1884–1963, Switzerland, p/d/nf)
- Wallace Stegner (1909–1993, US, f/nf)
- William Steig (1907–2003, US, ch)
- Otto Steiger (1909–2005, f)
- Marie Henriette Steil (1898–1930, Luxembourg, f/nf)
- Alicia Steimberg (1933–2012, Argentina, f)
- Gertrude Stein (1874–1946, US, f/p/d)
- Sylvester Stein (1920–2015, S Africa, nf/f)
- Steinn Steinarr (1908–1958, Iceland, p)
- John Steinbeck (1902–1968, US, f/nf)
- Jonny Steinberg (born 1970, S Africa, nf)
- Þórir Jökull Steinfinnsson (fl. 11th c. CE, Iceland, p)
- Guðmundur Steingrímsson (born 1972, Iceland, nf)
- Nicolae Steinhardt (1912–1989, Romania, f/nf)
- Angela Steinmüller (born 1941, Germany, f)
- Karlheinz Steinmüller (born 1950, Germany, f)
- Kristín Steinsdóttir (born 1946, Iceland, ch)
- Ginka Steinwachs (born 1942, Germany, nf/f/d)
- Eric Stenbock (1860–1895, England, p/f)
- Stendhal (1783–1842, France, f/nf)
- Polly Stenham (born 1986, England, d)
- Mattie Stepanek (1990–2004, US, p/nf)
- Joanne Stepaniak (born 1954, US, nf)
- Theodore Stephanides (1896–1983, India/England, nf/p)
- Stephan G. Stephansson (1853–1927, Iceland, p/nf), birth name Stefán Guðmundur Guðmundsson
- Stephen of Tbeti (fl. 10th c., Georgia, nf), in Georgian Stepane Mtbevari
- James Stephen (1758–1832, England, nf)
- Leslie Stephen (1932–2004, England, nf)
- H. Marion Stephens (1823–1858, US, f/nf)
- James Stephens (1880–1950, Ireland, p/f)
- James Brunton Stephens (1835–1902, Scotland/Australia, p/f)
- Māmari Stephens (born 1970, N Zealand, nf)
- Marta María Stephensen (1770–1805, Iceland, nf)
- Neal Stephenson (born 1959, US, f/nf)
- George Stepney (1663–1707, England, p/nf)
- John Steptoe (1950–1989, US, ch)
- Constantin Stere (1865–1936, Russian E/Romania, nf/f)
- Bruce Sterling (born 1954, US, f)
- Haki Stërmilli (1895–1953, Ottoman E/Albania, f/nf)
- Adolf Stern (1835–1907, Germany, nf/p), pseudonym of Adolf Ernst
- Anatol Stern (1899–1968, Russian E/Poland, p/d/nf)
- Gerald Stern (1925–2022, US, p/nf)
- Gladys Bronwyn Stern (1890–1973, England, f/d/nf)
- James Stern (1904–1993, Ireland/England, f/nf)
- Karl Stern (1906–1975, Germany/Canada, nf)
- Laurence Sterne (1713–1768, Ireland/England, f/nf)
- Stesichorus (c. 630–555 BCE, Greece, p)
- Fritz Steuben (1898–1981, Germany, f), pseudonym of Erhard Wittek
- Marinko Stevanović (born 1961, Yugoslavia/Austria, p)
- Vidosav Stevanović (born 1942, Yugoslavia/Serbia, f/p/d)
- C. J. Stevens (1927–2021, US, p/f/nf)
- Fisher Stevens (born 1963, US, f)
- Robin Stevens (born 1988, US/England, ch)
- W. Richard Stevens (1951–1999, N Rhodesia/US, nf)
- Wallace Stevens (1879–1955, US, p)
- Anne Stevenson (1933–2020, US/England, p/nf)
- Robert Louis Stevenson (1850–1894, Scotland/England, f/nf/p)
- William Bennet Stevenson (c. 1787 – post-1830, Peru, nf)
- Margo Taft Stever (living, US, p)
- The Two Steves (20th century author pair, Steve Barlow, living, and Steve Skidmore, born 1960, England, ch)
- Adela Blanche Stewart (1846–1910, N Zealand, nf)
- Amanda Stewart (born 1959, Australia, p)
- Douglas Stewart (1913–1985, p/f/nf)
- Fred Mustard Stewart (1932–2007, US, f)
- Harold Stewart (1916–1995, Australia, p/nf)
- J. I. M. Stewart (1906–1994, Scotland, f/nf)
- Jane Agnes Stewart (1860–1944, US, nf)
- Jennifer J. Stewart (living, US, ch)
- Mariah Stewart (living, US, f)
- Mary Stewart (1916–2014, England/Scotland, f/ch)
- Michael Stewart (born 1945, England, f/d)
- Michael Stewart (born 1971, England, d/f/p)
- Paul Stewart (born 1955, England, ch)
- Trenton Lee Stewart (born 1970, US, f)
- Trumbull Stickney (1874–1904, US, nf/p)
- Georg Stiernhielm (1598–1672, Sweden, nf/p)
- Adalbert Stifter (1805–1868, Austrian E, f)
- Terje Stigen (1922–2010, Norway, f/nf/d)
- James Still (1906–2001, US, p/f/nf)
- Isabel Stilwell (born 1960, Portugal, f/ch)
- Julius Stinde (1841–1905, Germany, f)
- R. L. Stine (born 1943, US, f/d)
- James Stirling (1692–1770, Scotland, nf)
- S. M. Stirling (born 1953, France/US, f)
- Max Stirner (1806–1856, Germany, nf)
- Francine Stock (born 1958, England, f/nf)
- Helene Stöcker (1869–1943, Germany/US, nf)
- Kathryn Stockett (born 1969, US, f)
- Jan Stocklassa (born 1965, Sweden, nf)
- Cynthia Stockley (1873–1936, S Africa/England, f)
- Frank R. Stockton (1834–1902, US, ch)
- Julian Stockwin (born 1944, England, f/nf)
- Hilda van Stockum (1908–2006, Netherlands/England, ch)
- Ivan Stodola (1888–1977, Hungary/Czechoslovakia, d/nf)
- Dejan Stojanović (born 1959, Yugoslavia/Serbia, p/nf)
- Milica Stojadinović-Srpkinja (1828–1878, Austria E/Serbia, p/nf)
- Dejan Stojanović (born 1959, Yugoslavia/US, p/nf)
- Ivan Stojanović (1829–1900, Serbia/Austria-Hungary, nf)
- Radosav Stojanović (born 1950, Yugoslavia/Serbia, p/f/d)
- Atanasije Stojković (1773–1832, Austrian E/Russian E, nf)
- Melis Stoke (c. 1235 – c. 1305, Netherlands, p)
- Bram Stoker (1847–1912, Ireland/England, f/nf)
- Maša Stokić (born 1966, Yugoslavia/Serbia, d/nf)
- Christian of Stolberg-Stolberg (1748–1821, Germany, p)
- David Lee Stone (born 1978, England, f/ch)
- Donna J. Stone (1933–1994, US, p)
- Irving Stone (1903–1989, US, f/nf), born Irving Tennenbaum
- Katherine Stone (born 1949, US, f)
- Robert Stone (1937–2015, US, f/nf)
- Ruth Stone (1915–2011, US, p)
- Billy Marshall Stoneking (1947–2016, US/Australia, p/d)
- Lisa Gluskin Stonestreet (born 1968, US, p)
- Miriam Stoppard (born 1937, England, nf)
- Tom Stoppard (born 1937, Czechoslovakia/England, d)
- Benjamin Stora (born 1950, Algeria/France, nf)
- Edward Storer (1880–1944, England, nf/p)
- David Storey (1933–2017, England, d/f)
- Edward Storey (1930–2018, England/Wales, p/d/nf)
- Margaret Storey (1926–2022, England, ch)
- Edvard Storm (1749–1794, Norway, p/nf)
- Theodor Storm (1817–1888, Germany, f/p)
- Alfonsina Storni (1892–1938, Argentina, p)
- Catherine Storr (1913–2001, England, ch)
- Agnes L. Storrie (1864–1936, Australia, p)
- Jack Trevor Story (1917–1991, England, f)
- Walter Scott Story (1879–1955, US, ch)
- Anna Stothard (born 1983, England, f)
- Peter Stothard (born 1951, England, nf)
- Randolph Stow (1935–2010, Australia, f/p/ch)
- Brian Stowell (1936–1919, Isle of Man, nf)
- Harold Strachan (1925–2020, S Africa, nf/f)
- Mari Strachan (born 1945, Wales, f)
- Zoë Strachan (born 1975, Scotland, f/nf)
- Barbara Strachey (1912–1999, England, nf)
- John Strachey (1860–1927, England, nf)
- John Strachey (1901–1963, England, nf)
- Lytton Strachey (1880–1932, England, nf)
- J. Michael Straczynski (born 1954, US, d/f)
- August Stramm (1874–1915, Germany, p/d)
- Mark Strand (1934–2014, Canada/US, p/nf)
- Herbert Strang (author pair, George Herbert Ely, 1866–1958, and Charles James L'Estrange, 1867–1947, England, ch)
- John Strang (1795–1863, Scotland, nf)
- Anton Strashimirov (1872–1937, Bulgaria, nf/d)
- Todd Strasser (born 1950, US, ch)
- Edward Stratemeyer (1862–1930, US, ch)
- Stanislav Stratiev (1941–2000, Bulgaria, d/nf)
- Linda Stratmann (born 1948, England, nf/f)
- Strattis (fl. c. 412 BCE, Greece, p)
- Gene Stratton-Porter (1863–1924, US, f/nf/ch)
- Botho Strauss (born 1944, Germany, d/f/nf)
- Darin Strauss (born 1970, US, f/nf)
- David Strauss (1808–1874, Germany, nf)
- David Levi Strauss (born 1953, US, p/nf)
- Jennifer Strauss (born 1933, Australia, p/nf)
- Noel Streatfeild (1895–1986, England, ch)
- Barry Streek (1948–2006, S Africa, nf)
- Jakob Streit (1910–2009, Switzerland, ch/nf)
- Hesba Stretton (1832–1911, England, ch)
- Stijn Streuvels (1871–1969, Belgium, f), pseudonym of Franciscus Petrus Maria Lateur
- Agnes Strickland (1796–1874, England, nf/p)
- Jane Margaret Strickland (1800–1888, England, f/nf)
- August Strindberg (1849–1912, Sweden, d/f/p)
- Olga Stringfellow (1923–1995, N Zealand/England, f/nf)
- Erwin Strittmatter (1912–1994, Germany, f)
- Eva Strittmatter (1930–2011, Germany, p)
- Eva Ström (born 1947, Sweden, f/p/nf)
- Fredrik Ström (1880–1948, Sweden, nf)
- Charles S. Strong (1906–1962, US, ch)
- Jeremy Strong (born 1949, England, ch)
- Charles Stross (born 1964, England, f/nf)
- Jonathan Stroud (born 1970, England, f/ch)
- Joseph Stroud (born 1943, US, p)
- Flora E. Strout (1867–1962, US, nf)
- Antje Rávic Strubel (born 1974, Germany, f/nf)
- Arkady and Boris Strugatsky (1933–2012 and 1925–1991, Soviet Union/Russia, f/d), brothers
- Alexander Stuart (living, England/US, f/d/ch)
- Andrea Stuart (born 1962, Barbados/England, nf)
- Dorothy Margaret Stuart (1889–1963, England, p/nf/ch)
- Douglas Stuart (born 1976, Scotland/US, f)
- Francis Stuart (1902–2000, Australia/Ireland, f/p/nf)
- Jesse Stuart (1906–1984, US, f/p/nf)
- Robyn Stuart (1914–1986, England, f), pseudonym of Vivian Stuart
- Sheila Stuart (1892–1974, Scotland, nf/ch), pseudonym of Gladys May Baker
- Vivian Stuart (1914–1986, England, f)
- William Stukeley (1687–1765, England, nf)
- Ľudovít Štúr (1815–1856, Austria-Hungary, nf)
- Theodore Sturgeon (1918–1985, US, f/nf)
- Sighvatr Sturluson (c. 1170–1238, Iceland, p)
- Snorri Sturluson (1179–1241, Iceland, nf/p)
- Jacquie Sturm (1927–2009, N Zealand, p/f), born Te Kare Papuni
- Julius Sturm (1806–1896, Germany, p)
- William Styron (1925–2006, US, f/nf)

== Su–Sz ==
- Su Buqing (蘇步青, 1902–2003, China, nf/p)
- Su Hui (蘇蕙, 4th c. CE, China, p)
- Su Manshu (蘇曼殊, 1884–1918, China, f/p)
- Su Qing (苏青, 1914–1982, China, f/nf)
- Su Shi (蘇軾, 1037–1101, China, p/nf)
- Su Tong (苏童, born 1963, China, p/nf)
- Su Xiaoxiao (蘇小小, c. 479 – c. 501, China, p)
- Su Xuelin (蘇雪林, 1897–1999, China, f/nf)
- Daniel Suarez (born 1964, US, f)
- Gastón Suárez (1929–1984, Bolivia, f/d)
- Ariano Suassuna (1927–2014, Brazil, p/f)
- Abhi Subedi (born 1945, Nepal, p/d/nf)
- Allamraju Subrahmanyakavi (1831–1892, India, p/nf)
- Bogdan Suceavă (born 1969, Romania/US, nf)
- Somtow Sucharitkul (born 1952, Thailand/US, f), pseudonym S. P. Somtow
- John Suckling (1609–1641, England, p)
- José Antonio Ramos Sucre (1890–1930, Venezuela, p/nf)
- Mohammed al-Tawdi ibn Suda (1790–1794/1795, Morocco, nf)
- Hermann Sudermann (1857–1928, Germany, d/f)
- Olivia Sudjic (born 1988, England/US, f)
- Eugène Sue (1804–1857, France/Italy, f)
- Suematsu Kenchō (末松謙澄, 1855–1920, Japan, nf)
- Laurence Suhner (born 1968, Switzerland, f)
- Laura Jane Suisted (1840–1903, N Zealand, nf)
- Huzir Sulaiman (born 1973, Malaya/Singapore, d)
- Suleiman the Magnificent (1494–1566, Ottoman E, p/nf)
- Andrew Sullivan (born 1963, England/US, nf)
- Deirdre Sullivan (living, Ireland, ch)
- Jennifer Sullivan (born 1945, Wales/France, ch/nf)
- Mark T. Sullivan (born 1958, US, f)
- Robert Sullivan (born 1967, N Zealand, p/nf)
- Thomas Sullivan (living, US, f)
- Zuhayr bin Abi Sulma (c. 520 – c. 609, Arabia, p)
- Nancy Sumari (born 1986, Tanzania, cs)
- Vetrliði Sumarliðason (fl. 10th c. CE, Iceland, p)
- Anne Summers (born 1945, Australia, nf)
- Essie Summers (1912–1998, N Zealand, f)
- Montague Summers (1880–1948, England, nf/p/d)
- Barbara Sumner (born 1960, N Zealand, nf)
- Sun Bin (孫臏, died 316 BCE, China, nf)
- Sun Guangyuan (孫光遠, 1900–1979, China, nf)
- Sun Guoting (孫過庭, 646–691, China, nf)
- Sun Tzu (孫子, c. 544 – c. 496 BCE, China, nf)
- Sun Simiao (孫思邈, died 682 CE, China, nf)
- Per Olof Sundman (1922–1992, Sweden, f/nf)
- Sunzi Suanjing (孙子算经, c. 3rd – 5th c. CE, China, nf)
- Jovan Sundečić (1825–1900, Ottoman E/Montenegro, p/nf)
- Jules Supervielle (1884–1960, Uruguay, p)
- Pingali Suranna (fl. 16th c. CE, India, p)
- Cemal Süreya (1931–1990, Turkey, p)
- Robert Smith Surtees (1805–1864, England, f/nf)
- Gordana Suša (1946–2021, Yugoslavia/Serbia, nf)
- Patrick Süskind (born 1949, Germany, f/d)
- Wilhelm Emanuel Süskind (1901–1970, Germany, nf)
- Henry Suso (1295–1366, Germany, nf), also Heinrich Seuse
- Alexander Süsskind of Grodno (died 1794, Russian E, nf)
- Süßkind von Trimberg (fl. later 13th c., Germany, p)
- Rita Süssmuth (1937–2026, Germany, nf)
- Miroslav Šustek (1947–2015, Czechoslovakia/Slovakia, f)
- Rosemary Sutcliff (1920–1992, England, ch)
- Alice Sutcliffe (fl. 1624–1634, England, nf)
- Katherine Sutcliffe (born 1952, US, f)
- Thomas Sutcliffe (c. 1790–1849, England, nf)
- Martin Suter (born 1948, Switzerland, f/nf/d)
- Rudolf Sutermeister (1802–1868, Switzerland, nf)
- Efua Sutherland (1924–1996, Gold Coast/Ghana, d/p/ch)
- John Sutherland (born 1938, England, nf)
- András Sütő (1927–2006, Romania/Hungary, d/f/nf)
- Bertha von Suttner (1843–1914, Austrian E/Austria, nf/f)
- D. T. Suzuki (鈴木大拙貞太郎, 1870–1966, Japan, nf)
- Kōji Suzuki (鈴木光司, 1957–2026, Japan, f/nf)
- Miekichi Suzuki (鈴木三重吉, 1882–1936, Japan, f)
- Janez J. Švajncer (born 1948, Yugoslavia/Slovenia, nf)
- František Švantner (1912–1950, Hungary/Czechoslovakia, f)
- Karin Sveen (born 1948, Norway, p/f/nf)
- Jón Sveinsson (1857–1944, Iceland, ch)
- Maria Sveland (born 1974, Sweden, nf)
- Italo Svevo (1861–1928, Italy, f/d), pseudonym of Aron Hector Schmitz
- Ladislav Švihran (1931–2022, Belgium/Slovakia, nf)
- Rosie Swale-Pope (born 1946, Ireland/Wales, nf)
- Annie S. Swan (1859–1943, Scotland, f/nf)
- Nathaniel Walter Swan (1834–1884, Ireland/Australia, nf/f)
- Leonie Swann (born 1975, Germany, f)
- Michael Swanwick (born 1950, US, f)
- Robert Sward (1933–2022, US/Canada, p/f)
- Vikas Swarup (born 1961, India, f)
- Nan Nyunt Swe (1923–2010, Burma/Myanmar, p/nf/f)
- Emanuel Swedenborg (1688–1782, Sweden/England, nf)
- Jon M. Sweeney (born 1967, US, nf/f/ch)
- Cole Swensen (born 1945, US, p/nf)
- Karen Swenson (born 1936, US, p/nf)
- May Swenson (1913–1989, US, p/d)
- Marcin Świetlicki (born 1961, Poland, p)
- Graham Swift (born 1949, England, f/nf)
- Jonathan Swift (1667–1745, Ireland/England, nf/p)
- Susie Forrest Swift (1862–1916, United States, nf)
- Algernon Charles Swinburne (1837–1909, England, p/d/f)
- Randall Swingler (1909–1967, England, p)
- Bertha Swirles (1903–1999, England, nf)
- Anna Świrszczyńska (1909–1984, Poland, p)
- Meera Syal (born 1961, England, d/f)
- Abdul Mannan Syed (1943–2010, India/Bangladesh, p/f/nf)
- Bobbi Sykes (1943–2010, Australia, p/nf)
- Khady Sylla (1963–2013, Senegal, f/d)
- Harry Sylvester (1908–1993, US, f)
- Josuah Sylvester (1563–1618, England, p)
- Matthew Sylvester (c. 1636–1708, England, nf)
- Vanda Symon (born 1969, N Zealand, f)
- Arthur Symons (1865–1945, Wales/England, p/nf)
- Mitchell Symons (born 1957, England, f/nf)
- John Millington Synge (1871–1909, Ireland, d/p/nf)
- Władysław Syrokomla (1823–1862, Russian E, p)
- Dezső Szabó (1879–1945, Hungary, f/nf)
- Lőrinc Szabó (1900–1957, Hungary, p)
- Magda Szabó (1917–2007, Hungary, d/f/ch)
- Fruzina Szalay (1864–1926, Austria-Hungary/Hungary, p/f)
- Michael Szameit (1950–2014, Germany, f)
- George Szanto (born 1940, Ireland/Canada, f/d/nf)
- Mikołaj Sęp Szarzyński (c. 1550 – c., Poland, p)
- Sándor Szathmári (1897–1974, Austria-Hungary/Hungary, nf)
- Louis Szathmary (1919–1996, Hungary/US, nf)
- Arthur Sze (施家彰, born 1950, US, p)
- István Széchenyi (1791–1860, Austria-Hungary, nf)
- Noémi Szécsi (born 1976, Hungary, f)
- Júlia Székely (1906–1986, Austria-Hungary/Hungary, nf/f)
- Bertalan Szemere (1812–1869, Austria-Hungary, p)
- Gyula Szentessy (1870–1905, Austria-Hungary, p)
- Mária Szepes (1908–2007, Austria-Hungary/Hungary, d/f/nf)
- Antal Szerb (1901–1945, Austria-Hungary/Hungary, f/nf), Holocaust victim
- Ede Szigligeti (1814–1878, Austria-Hungary, d)
- George Szirtes (born 1948, Hungary/England, p)
- Janusz Szpotański (1929–1991, Poland, p/nf)
- Edina Szvoren (born 1974, Hungary, f/p)
- Melinda Szymanik (born 1963, N Zealand, ch)
- Włodzimierz Szymanowicz (1946–1967, Poland, p)
- Wisława Szymborska (1923–2012, Poland, p/nf)
- Szymon Szymonowic (1558–1629, Poland, p)
