= Borsodi =

Borsodi or Borsody can refer to:

- A resident of Borsod, Hungary, now part of Borsod-Abaúj-Zemplén county
- Borsodi beer, the flagship product of Borsod Brewery in Hungary
  - Borsodi Liga, the nickname of the Hungarian League from 2005 to 2007, when it was sponsored by the brewery

== Surname ==
- Ralph Borsodi (1886–1977), American agrarian theorist
- Béla Bevilaqua-Borsodi (1885–1962), Hungarian cultural historian
- Eduard von Borsody (1898–1970), Austrian cameraman, film editor, film director and screenplay writer
- Hans von Borsody (1929–2013), German filmmaker
- Julius von Borsody (1892–1960), Austrian film architect
- Suzanne von Borsody (born 1957), German actress
