= Šaltenis =

- Lithuanian surname
- m.: Šaltenis
- f.: (unmarried): Šaltenytė
- f.: (married): Šaltenienė

Šaltenis is a Lithuanian language family name. It may refer to:

- Saulius Šaltenis, Lithuanian politician
- Rapolas Šaltenis, Lithuanian journalist, author, translator, and teacher
- Aldona Jonuškaitė-Šaltenienė, Lithuanian ceramic artist
