= Sýslumaðurinn sem sá álfa =

Icelandic crime novel

- First edition
- Author: Ernir Kristján Snorrason
- Language: Icelandic
- Publisher: Sögur
- Publication date: 8 May 2012
- Pages: 201
- ISBN: 978-9935-41685-8
- OCLC: 1031110429

Sýslumaðurinn sem sá álfa, by Ernir Kristján Snorrason, is an Icelandic crime novel relating to the 2008–11 Icelandic financial crisis. It was published in Reykjavík in 2012 by Sögur. Unusually, it was not only published after its author's death, but actually on the day of his funeral (8 May 2012). In the dedication of the book, Ernir calls it "my farewell to my beloved friends—and to the world I love so passionately" ("kveðja mín til ástvina minna—og umheimsins sem ég ann svo heitt").

== Form ==
The novel belongs ostensibly to the genre of the thriller/crime novel, but takes a light-hearted, parodic tone, including absurdist elements which complicate the genre-characteristics of the thriller.

== Plot ==
The novel is set in the wake of the 2008–11 Icelandic financial crisis. The main protagonist is Bjarni, the sheriff (sýslumaður) of Rangárvallasýsla. At the start of the novel he has recently lost his wife Elínborg to cancer and recovered from major injuries caused by a fall on the day of her death. He is nevertheless called by his old friend Möller, the justice minister, to help Iceland's post-Crash Office of the Special Prosecutor to investigate the possibility that Iceland was used for money-laundering by the Russian mafia, who ran a 'bank within the bank' in the Icelandic banking sector.

Björn explains to his childhood friend Bíbí (Jónína), a bookshop owner whose husband has left her, that he cannot sleep alone as he is afraid of the dark: specifically of the elves from the elf-hill next to his family home that try to break into his house to get out of the cold. He convinces Bíbí to take a job as his personal secretary and to sleep alongside him, and thus they begin a passionate relationship that absorbs most of their attention for the course of the novel (and implicitly beyond). However, in some ways Björn has good relations with the elves: an elf called Gaui teaches Björn how to guess what people are thinking and apparently delivers him a prophetic dream explaining where the 'bank within the bank' has been stashed.

With Bíbí, Björn resolves local tensions in Rangárvallasýsla over two farmers who have swapped between them a Russian employee for a tractor, thus attracting accusations of slave-trading; and travels to New York to talk to a Canadian-Italian mafia boss, Mr Barósó, whom Björn wins over by his shrewd perception of character, and a CIA agent, Abraham Collins. Björn manages to convince Collins that the reason for Britain's Landsbanki Freezing Order 2008 was to eliminate Iceland as a rival to the UK financial sector as Russian criminals' money-launderer of choice. Under the pretext of a terrorist threat to the American Embassy in Iceland, Collins subsequently organises a meeting in Paris with Möller, Björn, Bíbí, two Scandinavians, and Vladimir Vitkosky (who, as well as being Russian's representative to Europol, is known to the reader both as an oligarch and as a mafia member).

The denouement of the novel sees Bjarni following his prophetic dream and a tip-off from a farmer to recover the bank within the bank, and foiling Vitkosky's attempt to kill him in revenge. The bank within the bank is secretly seized by the Icelandic Central Bank.
