= Gyula Szentessy =

Hungarian poet

Gyula Szentessy (18 December 1870 in Oradea – 30 October 1905 in Budapest) was a Hungarian poet.

== Biography ==
Szentessy lived in Oradea, Cluj, and Buda. He studied law at the University of Budapest and was Assistant Hungarian Postmaster General. His sister Mária was the mother of the cultural historian Bela Borsody Bevilaqua, Ph.D. Gyula's grandfather was Daniel Szentessy one of the globetrotters that Bela Borsody wrote about in his book entitled Regi Magyar Vilagjrok or Hungarian Old World Travellers. Dániel Szentessy (1805, Zemplénszentes – 1895, Nagyvárad) was a sword-forging master. His family ruled the city of Szentes from which his surname is derived szentesi. After the early death of his parents, he was adopted by a Nagyvárad merchant. He completed the Várad Latin school, and studied sword-forging. As a journeyman, he started his wanderings in 1825. The main stations of his fifteen years of travels were the world-famous places of contemporary armoury: Vienna, Innsbruck, Alsace-Lorraine, Flandreau, Sheffield, Bayonne, Cordoba, Toledo, Algiers, Tunis, Damascus, and Istanbul. He returned home to open a workshop in Nagyvárad in 1840. He took part in the 1848 Revolution. He was court-martialed and sentenced to two years’ imprisonment in Munkács Castle. Released in 1851, he lived in Nagyvárad until his death.

Gyula Szentessy's mother was the widow of the mayor of Cluj. She had to become a seamstress and was exposed to the dreary life of proletárian suffering. Gyula felt the beauty of human life, especially in the working lives of women. His poetry promoted socialist reforms for women. His poetry focused on the recognition that love is the only happiness of the human soul. Love makes it possible to achieve the most beautiful dreams. Literary historians consider Gyula Szentessy to be a poet describing social classes of the circles of proletarian and poor petty bourgeois women. Although the theme of a lot of his poems can be related to urban scenes, the linguistic and poetic aspect of his ways of presentation does not seem so stratified. A typical feature of his poetry is making contrasts between scenes like country and town, or effects like darkness and light, silence and noise, which often carries metaphorical or allegorical meaning.

One of his most famous poems was written about his mother.

== Works ==
- The Admirer and other poems (Budapest, 1896)
- Dalai Ninon's Songs (Budapest, 1896–97)
- Factory Girls and other poems (Budapest, 1898)
- Selected Poems (Budapest, 1900)
- Rezeda and other newer poems (Budapest, 1902)
- The Collected Poems of Gyula Szentessy, with biography by Pál Koroda (Budapest, 1906)
