= Rupert Shortt =

British author

Rupert Shortt is a British author, biographer and journalist. He is known for writing about the modern persecution of Christians around the world, including in his book Christianophobia: A Faith Under Attack, and for a series of works defending the coherence of classical theism in general and a Christian world view in particular.

Rowan Williams wrote that Shortt's book God Is No Thing: Coherent Christianity "deserves a place alongside the best intelligent responses to the New Atheism."

Shortt is a Fellow Commoner of St Edmund's College, Cambridge and was religion editor of The Times Literary Supplement from 2000 to 2020.

== Books ==
- Rowan Williams: An Introduction (Darton, Longman and Todd, 2003) ISBN 978-0-232-52490-1
- God’s Advocates: Christian Thinkers in Conversation (ed.) (Darton, Longman and Todd, 2005) ISBN 978-0-232-52545-8
- Benedict XVI: Commander of the Faith (Hodder, 2005) ISBN 978-0-340-909050-8
- Rowan's Rule: The Biography of the Archbishop (Hodder, 2008) ISBN 978-1-4447-8743-6
- Christianophobia: A Faith Under Attack (Rider, 2012) ISBN 978-1-84604-277-5
- God Is No Thing: Coherent Christianity (Hurst, 2016) ISBN 978-1-80526-161-2
- Does Religion Do More Harm than Good? (SPCK, 2019) ISBN 978-0-281-07871-4
- Outgrowing Dawkins: God for Grown-Ups (SPCK, 2019) ISBN 978-0-281-08410-4
- The Hardest Problem: God, Evil and Suffering (Hodder, 2022) ISBN 978-1-3998-0272-7
- The Eclipse of Christianity - and Why It Matters (Hodder, 2024) ISBN 978-1-3998-0274-1
