= H. Marion Stephens =

American actress and writer

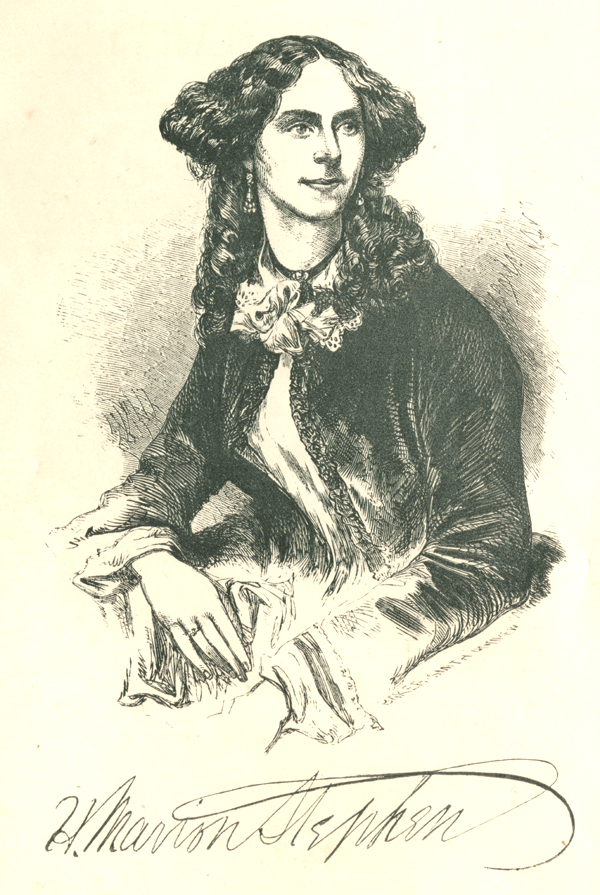
- 1855 portrait of H. Marion Stephens, from the frontispiece of Hagar, the Martyr
- Born: Harriet Marion Atwell; July 2, 1823; Sidney, Maine, United States
- Died: August 27, 1858 (aged 35); East Hampden, Maine, United States
- Occupations: Writer, actress
- Writing career
- Notable works: Hagar, the Martyr

Harriet Marion Stephens (née Atwell; July 2, 1823 – August 27, 1858), known professionally as Miss Rosalie Somers and by the pen names H. Marion Stephens and Marion Ward, was an American actress, poet, short-story writer, and novelist. After beginning her career on the stage, she turned to writing and contributed poetry and fiction to periodicals including Godey's Lady's Book and Gleason's Pictorial. Her books include the collection Home Scenes and Home Sounds (1854) and the novel Hagar the Martyr (1855).

== Early life ==
Stephens was born Harriet Marion Atwell on July 2, 1823, in Sidney, Maine, to Rev. John and Sarah Butterfield Atwell.

== Career ==
Stephens began her career as an actress under the name Miss Rosalie Somers. She began writing and publishing around 1848 using the name Marion Ward. In 1851, she ended her acting career and began writing full time.

Stephens's poetry and fiction appeared in various periodicals. These included Godey's Lady's Book, American Union, Gleason's Pictorial, and The Boston Times. Some of her poems served as the lyrics for songs. Stephens also adapted Henry William Herbert's Marmaduke Wyvil and several of Charles Dickens's stories to the stage.

Stephens's first book, Home Scenes and Home Sounds; or, The World From My Window (1854), collected her previously published short stories and poems into a single volume. Stephens's novel Hagar The Martyr; or, Passion And Reality, A Tale of The North and South was published in 1855. The plot featured a Southern heroine whose ambiguous racial identity served as a point of tension throughout the story. Norton's Literary Gazette and Publishers' Circular summarized positive reviews of the book from The Boston Times, Concord Patriot and Gazette, Portsmouth Journal and others. However, a review in the abolitionist newspaper The National Era wrote that the book's "sins against good style are only exceeded by its recklessness of propriety."

== Personal life ==
In 1848, Stephens married Richard Stephens, a comedian. H. Marion Stephens died of tuberculosis in East Hampden, Maine, on August 27, 1858.
