= Semyon Shurtakov =

Russian writer

Semyon Ivanovich Shurtakov (Russian: Семён Иванович Шуртаков; 26 January 1918 — 13 April 2014) was a Soviet Russian writer.

He was born in the village of Kuzminka (now in Sergachsky District, Nizhny Novgorod Oblast). He fought in the Great Patriotic War, serving in the Pacific Fleet. In 1951 he graduated with honors from the Gorky Institute. In 1957 he joined the Union of Writers of the USSR. He wrote more than 30 books of prose and essays, and he was also a talented translator who worked mainly from other languages within the Soviet Union.

Among the literary prizes he won was the Gorky Prize in 1987 for his novel Одолень-трава; he donated the prize money to fund a monument to the martyrs of the Great Patriotic War in his native village of Kuzminka.

He was known for his contributions to children's literature; his work was translated into Bengali by Noni Bhoumik for inclusion in an anthology of children's stories called "Brishti ar Nokkhotro" (The Rain and the Stars).
