= Allamraju Subrahmanyakavi =

Allamraju Subrahmanyakavi (1831–1892) was a Telugu writer.

== Biography ==
Allamraju was born in Pithapuram in Andhra Pradesh and belonged to the Brahmin caste. His parents were Gangamamba and Rangasai. He studied literature from his guru, Nagabhatla Narasakavi. He was a protégé of Krishnabhupathi, the head of Sthansthana Madugula Sthansthana from 1853 to 1869. He was also a protégé at Gangadhararamarao of Pithapuram Sansthanam in 1869.

== Writings ==
- Srikrishna Bhupathilama Satakam (1853)
- Sesha Dharmamulu (poetry) (1867)
- Papayamantri Satakam
- Atmabodhamu (poetry in Telugu) (1875)
- Manidhvaja Charitramu.
- Simhadri Ramadhipa Satakam (1876)
- Bhadraparinayam (1978)
- Srikrishna Lila Kalyanam (1978)
- Chatudhara Camatkarasaram
