= Marinko Stevanović =

Marinko Bunić
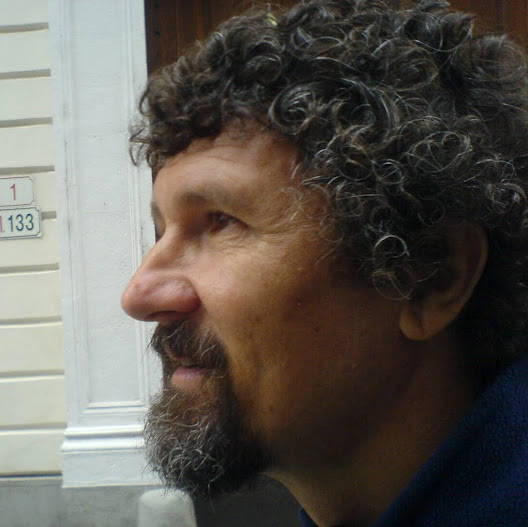
- Born: May 23, 1961; Liješanj, Bosnia and Herzegovina
- Occupation: Poet

Marinko Bunić (née Stevanović) (May 23, 1961) is a Yugoslav writer.

He was born in the village of Liješanj near Zvornik, now he lives in Vienna, Austria since 1992. He attended schools in Drinjača (primary school) and Gymnasium (secondary school ) in Zvornik. Then he studied astronomy at the University of Belgrade 1981-1984. He switched his interest to pedagogy and graduated at the Pedagogical Academy, University of Tuzla 1987 which gained him a right to work as a primary school teacher.

Marinko has been writing poems since 1976 in the opus „Provincijski razgovori“ (Provincial conversations). He never publishes his poems as a collection of poems in a printed form, only within a free online Magnum opus Provincijski razgovori (Provincial conversations). Opus consists of three parts: Provincijski razgovori (Provincial conversations); U svijetu prašine (In the world of dust) and Urbani razgovori (Urban conversations). His poems have a humanistic and antiwar character, with an antipatriotic connotation. His poems have been translated into English, Dutch and German. He also writes in German.
