= Carol Ann Sima =

American surrealist writer (born 1956)

Carol Ann Sima (born 1956) is an American surrealist writer.

== Life ==
Carol Ann Sima was born in New York. She is a grade school language arts teacher in New York.

Sima's first novel, Jane's bad hare day (1995), tells the story of a divorced New Yorker woman, Jane Samuels, who achieves clairvoyant insight into her future after being assaulted by a six-foot hare. Her second novel, The mermaid that came between them (2001) tells the story of an author, Jacob Koleman, and his son, Mac, who both fall in love with a mermaid, Claritha, who is facing menopause and looking for someone to fertilize her last golden egg.

== Works ==
- Jane's bad hare day: a novel. Normal, Illinois: Dalkey Archive Press, 1995.
- The mermaid that came between them. Minneapolis: Coffee House Press, 2001.
