= E. X. Giroux =

Canadian author

Doris Shannon
- Born: Doris Giroux; August 7, 1924; Elmira, New York, U.S.
- Died: August 13, 2012 (aged 88)
- Citizenship: United States, Canada
- Education: Napanee District Secondary School, Ontario, Canada (1939–42)
- Occupation: Mystery writer
- Spouses: Frank Owen Shannon (1942)
- Children: 2
- Parent(s): Edmund Giroux and Elizabeth Graham
- Writing career
- Pen name: E. X. Giroux

E. X. Giroux, the pseudonym of Doris Shannon (August 7, 1924 – August 13, 2012), who also wrote under her own name, was a U.S.-born Canadian writer of mystery novels set in the United Kingdom. Her published work appeared in two series of 10 novels each between 1972 and 1993. Earlier, between 1942 and 1949, she worked as a clerk for the Royal Bank of Canada in Napanee, Ontario, and Vancouver, British Columbia.

== Critical reception ==
Writing for the St. James Guide to Crime and Mystery Writers, Carol M. Harper says, "E. X. Giroux has created a pair of detectives who get into the business by accident... Robert (Robby) Forsyth is [a] barrister... Abigail (Sandy) Sanderson is his secretary. They have special knowledge, special skills, which make them a fascinating team, respected by the police and lionized by the press."

Kirkus Reviews pans Shannon's 1981 novel, The Punishment. Its reviewer says, "Obviously at sea outside her historical-romance niche, Shannon (Beyond the Shining Mountains) delivers this gnarled nonsense in shrill, leaden dialogue and prose that swings from routine-tacky to epically awful. Still, for undiscriminating fans of lurid horror-shows—a very busy, probably passable stew.

Of the E. X. Giroux mystery A Death for a Dreamer (1989) Publishers Weekly says, "After six books...in Giroux's series featuring barrister Robert Forsythe and his loyal secretary, Abigail 'Sandy' Sanderson, the author shows no signs of faltering. Her latest effort is another well-crafted mystery with vividly depicted characters." Of a later Giroux novel, A Death for a Dancing Doll (1991), a reviewer writes, "Though the pace occasionally drags, particularly over interludes of redundant Q & A, Giroux wraps up the action with a chillingly apt denouement."

== Bibliography ==
As E. X. Giroux

- A Death for Adonis (1984)
- A Death for a Darling (1985)
- A Death for a Dancer (1985)
- A Death for a Doctor (1986)
- A Death for a Dilettante (1987)
- A Death for a Dietitian (1988)
- A Death for a Dreamer (1989)
- A Death for a Dancing Doll (1991)
- A Death for a Dodo (1993)
- The Dying Room (1993)

As Doris Shannon

- The Whispering Runes (1972)
- Twenty-two Hallofield (1974)
- The Seekers (1975)
- Hawthorn Hill (1976)
- The Lodestar Legacy (1976)
- Cain's Daughters (1978)
- Beyond the Shining Mountains (1979)
- The Punishment (1981)
- Little Girls Lost (1981)
- Family Money (1984)
