= Srđan Srdić =

Serbian novelist, short-story writer, essayist, editor, publisher and teacher

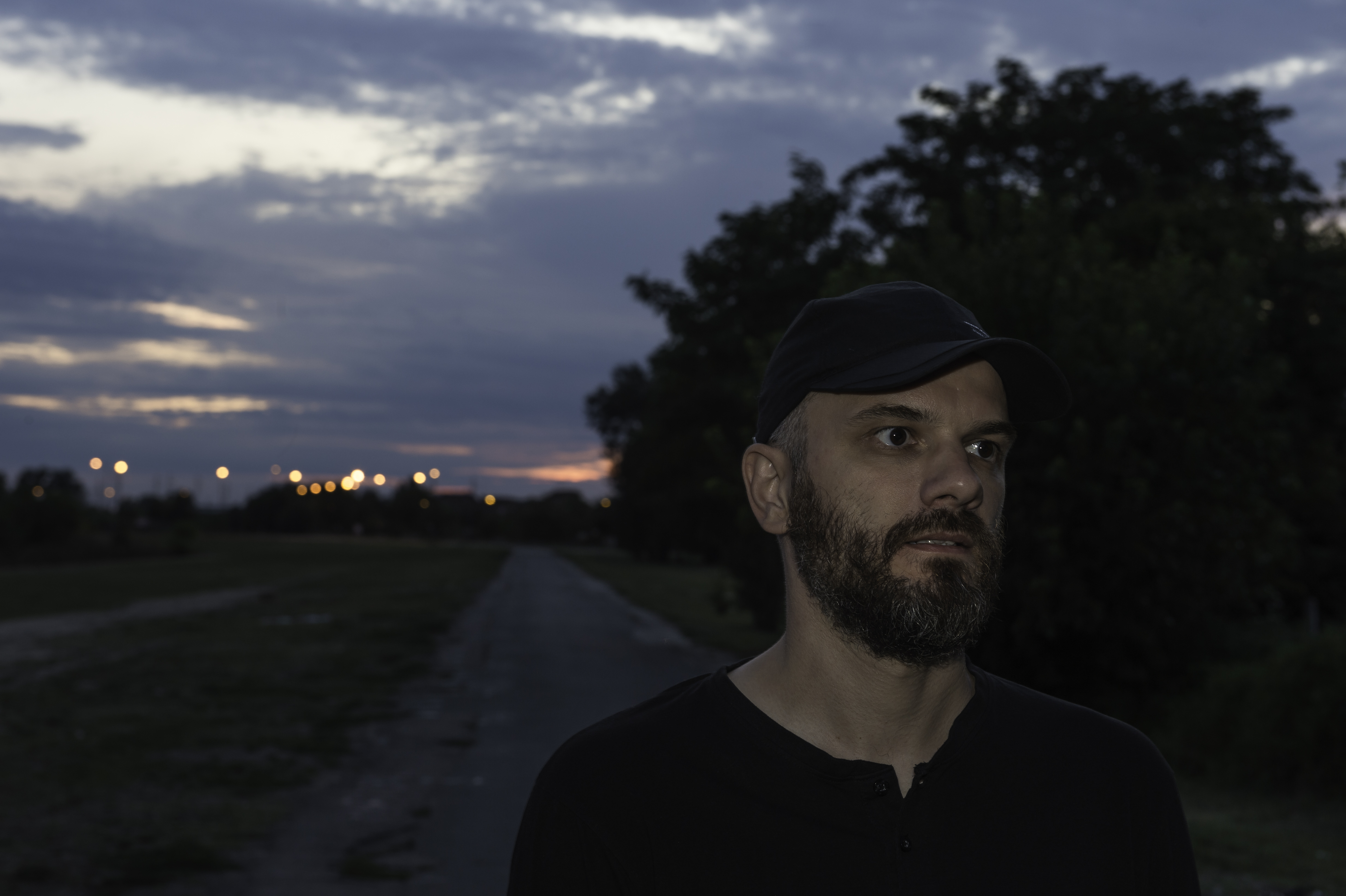
- Srđan Srdić in Kikinda, September 2017
- Born: 3 November 1977 (age 48); Kikinda, Yugoslavia (modern-day Serbia)
- Education: PhD in Philology
- Occupations: Novelist, short-story writer
- Writing career
- Genre: Literary fiction

Srđan Srdić (Serbian Cyrillic: Срђан Срдић; born 3 November 1977) is a Serbian novelist, short-story writer, essayist, editor, publisher and creative reading/writing teacher. He has published four novels, two short story collections and a book of essays, and has contributed as a writer and/or editor to several short story collections and literary magazines.

== Early life ==
Srdić was born on 3 November 1977 in Kikinda.

After completing his secondary education in a music school, Srdić acquired a degree in world literature and literary theory from the University of Belgrade Faculty of Philology, where he also defended his PhD thesis entitled Relationship between Reality and Fiction in Jonathan Swift's Prose.

== Career ==
=== Beginnings ===
In 2007, while still working as a high school literature teacher, Srdić won the first prize at the Ulaznica short story competition, and in 2009 he received the Laza Lazarević story award. The following year, he was awarded the Borislav Pekić grant (Pekić coincidentally being an important literary influence) for a short story collection project. From 2008 to 2011, he served as the editor/program manager of the international short story festival Kikinda Short. He returned to this position in September 2015.

In 2010, Srdić published his first novel, the road horror Mrtvo polje (Dead Field), receiving several positive reviews, and ending up short-listed for several national literary prizes in Serbia (NIN, Vital, Borisav Stanković) and for the international Meša Selimović prize. The novel was praised particularly for its language, i.e. for finding the stylistic and formal devices needed to deal with the subject matter, the use of both modernist (along with the comparisons to Ulysses) and postmodernist techniques, and the frequent shifts of perspective and register. Set in 1993 wartime Serbia, it follows several converging story lines, Pablo and Paolo traveling from Belgrade to Kikinda dodging the military draft, one due to his idiosyncratic appropriation of the violent ideologies around, the other following him aimlessly, Stela making the same trip in the opposite direction, and a quasi-psychopathic military captain showing Cormac McCarthy's influence. According to the author, the novel is a tragedy, something which is evident in the plot's denouement of inevitable death and incest, the tragedy being "in the context, not the characters." Like much of Srdić's work, it relies heavily on intertextuality, featuring connections to, besides those already mentioned, Jerzy Kosiński, William Faulkner, Georges Bataille, Godflesh, Khanate, etc. It also comprises a discography and videography section.

Espirando: Songs Unto Death (Pesme na smrt) consists of nine short stories, all dealing in some way with death (the lead-up to, process and/or aftermath of death). Published in 2011, it received the Biljana Jovanović award and the international Edo Budiša award, as well as several highly positive reviews noting its elliptical and formally diverse approach to language, with the narrative voices ranging from the conventional first-person to the wildly polyphonic, and the linguistic representation of the characters' limit-states of mourning, violence, illness, sexual longing, suicide, "frightening banality". The collection features numerous intertextual relations, the prominent influence of Samuel Beckett in the characters "completely in conflict with the world", the pastiche of Faulkner's A Rose for Emily, Perry Farrell quotes, the story Zozobra taking its name from the Old Man Gloom song, Medicine from the Jesu song, the references to Thomas Mann, Henri Michaux, Michel Houellebecq. All the stories had previously been published in literary magazines in Serbia and Croatia. The Ukrainian translation of the collection was published in 2013. The story Grey, Gloomy Something was published in English in The Ofi Press Magazine, and Mosquitoes was translated into Albanian and published in the short story anthology From Belgrade, with love (Nga Beogradi, me dashuri ). Srdić's stories have also been translated into Romanian, Hungarian and Polish.

=== 2013–2016 ===
Srdić's second novel, Satori, was published in 2013 by the KrR (Rašić Literary Workshop) publishing house. The sole narrator, referring to himself as the Driver, walks out of the city and his social roles, reminiscing and encountering people on the fringes of society, offering thus a digressive, disjointed narrative, with a sense of solipsistic horror exposed through the characters' language. "Not a novel that isn't about anything, but one that is about nothing", it also deals with banality and anxiety of/and freedom, with a focus on the narrator's contacts with the military, even obliquely addressing the repercussions of war crimes ("the existence of PTSD even in those who weren't directly involved in the war"). The novel contains page long quotations of Oblomov, Sentimental Education and an interview with Kayo Dot's Toby Driver. Godspeed You! Black Emperor's The Dead Flag Blues and the cartoon series Stripy also feature prominently within the text. Though it uses devices common to the bildungsroman and the road novel, it was referred to by the author as an anti-bildungsroman, with the protagonist learning nothing and getting nowhere. Satori was praised for showing a further improvement in Srdić's work, particularly present in an ironic distance previously somewhat missing, and for offering, through the quoted texts, new ways of reading Satori and those texts themselves. The same reviewer places it in a post-world, invoking the opening quotations of the post-structuralists Roland Barthes and Jean-François Lyotard, and of the post-rock band Mogwai. A more ambiguous review, while noting Srdić's writerly virtues and significance, showed some reservations about the purposeful randomness and lack of meaning. The novel Satori was published in Ukraine in 2015 in Alla Tatarenko's translation. It was published in Macedonia in 2016.

Combustions, Srdić's second short story collection, was published in May 2014. This book was also published by the KrR publishing house (Rašić Literary Workshop). It contains nine stories which treat the problem of identity in various narrative ways. For the synopsis of Combustions Srdić was awarded the Borislav Pekić grant. The literary critic Vladimir Arsenić, including Srdić among the most important post-Yugoslav writers, emphasises his linguistic meticulousness, as well as new reaches of Srdić's procedure, evident in the story About the Door, which he considers a masterpiece. Mirnes Sokolović has a critical stance towards the book, not questioning Srdić's relevance. In his opinion certain stories are unconvincing, whereas the story Summertime is his favourite. Srđan Vidrić describes Combustions as a radical and uncompromising book intended for more competent readers, which "contributes significantly to the Serbian art of story-telling". Five stories from Combustions have been published in American and Scottish literary magazines in Nataša Miljković's translation.

Srdić's first collection of essays entitled Zapisi iz čitanja (Notes from Reading) was published in 2014. In the afterword to this book, Srdić's editor Ivan Radosavljević states that the seven collected essays "will, on one hand, attract those readers who are interested in the topics Srdić deals with here and, on the other hand, it will attract those readers who are interested in this author as a story-teller and novelist, given that this book offers particular insights into his intellectual and artistic habitus." Notes from Reading has had excellent reception. In an extremely positive review of the book, Dragan Babić states that Srdić is "more than an admirer" of the authors he writes about, and that he is their "excellent interpreter".

In December 2015, Srdić established a publishing house named Partizanska knjiga. In 2017, he signed the Declaration on the Common Language of the Croats, Serbs, Bosniaks and Montenegrins.

=== 2017–2020 ===
In 2017, Srdić published his third novel titled Srebrna magla pada (Silver fog is falling). This was his first book released through his own publishing house, Partizanska knjiga from Kikinda. In January 2018, the novel was selected among the five finalists for the NIN award for the novel of the year 2017, but did not win.

== Bibliography ==
=== Novels ===
- Mrtvo polje. Beograd: Stubovi kulture. 2010. ISBN 978-86-7979-308-9
- Satori. Beograd: Književna radionica Rašić. 2013. ISBN 978-86-6351-000-5
- Srebrna magla pada. Kikinda: Partizanska knjiga. 2017. ISBN 978-86-6477-016-3
- Ljubavna pesma. Kikinda: Partizanska knjiga. 2020. ISBN 978-86-6477-059-0
- Autosekcija,. Kikinda: Partizanska knjiga. 2023. ISBN 978-86-6477-123-8

=== Short stories ===
- Espirando. Beograd: Stubovi kulture. 2011. ISBN 978-86-7979-346-1
- Sagorevanja. Beograd: Književna radionica Rašić. 2014. ISBN 978-86-6351-006-7

=== Essays ===
- Zapisi iz čitanja. Novi Sad: Kulturni centar Novog Sada. 2014.ISBN 978-86-7931-395-9.

=== Short story anthologies ===
- Da sam Šejn. Zagreb: Konzor. 2007. p. 229-234. ISBN 978-953-224-201-0
- Kikinda Short 3.0. Kikinda: Narodna biblioteka "Jovan Popović". 2009.- as editor ISBN 978-86-7378-031-3
- Kikinda Short 04. Kikinda: Narodna biblioteka "Jovan Popović". 2010. – as editor ISBN 978-86-7378-033-7
- Kikinda Short 05 Kikinda: Narodna biblioteka "Jovan Popović".2011. – as editor ISBN 978-86-914515-0-9
- Nga Beogradi, me dashuri. Priština: MM. 2011. p. 155-172. ISBN 978-9951-516-05-1
- Izvan koridora. Zagreb: V.B.Z. d.o.o. 2011. p. 151-159. ISBN 978-9940-9215-6-9
- U znaku vampira: muške priče o krvopijama. Beograd: Paladin. 2012. p. 96-105. ISBN 978-86-87701-20-5
- Pucanja: izbor iz mlade srpske proze. Beograd: Službeni glasnik. 2012. ISBN 978-86-519-1536-2
- Putnik sa dalekog neba: Miloš Crnjanski u priči. Beograd: Laguna. 2013. p. 339-348. ISBN 978-86-521-1301-9
- Nova srpska pripovetka. Beograd: Paladin. 2013. p. 462-470. ISBN 978-86-87701-37-3
- Gavrilov princip: priče o sarajevskom atentatu. Beograd: Laguna. 2014. p. 115-129. ISBN 978-86-521-1551-8
