= Liesel Schwarz =

British steampunk author

Liesel Schwarz is a British steampunk author, often referred to as "The High Priestess of British Steampunk". She was born in South Africa.

== Works ==
- A Conspiracy of Alchemists
- A Clockwork Heart
- Sky Pirates
