= Changanti Seshayya =

Chaganty Seshayya (1881–1956) was a Telugu writer and historian.

== Biography ==
He was born in Kapileswaram, Madras Presidency to Krishnayya and Subbamma. He completed his primary education in kapileswaram. After his primary education he gained the knowledge of literature in Telugu, English and Sanskrit languages. He has worked as personal secretary to Kovvuri Chandrareddy who was one of the partners to establish a publishing agency "Andhra pracharani grantha nilayam". He worked as a Diwan at Jamindar of Kapileswaram. By the inspiration of Jamindar he published his book "Andhra kavi tarangini". The book consists of 25 volumes. But he published only the first 10 volumes. The first volume published in 1946 and the tenth published in 1953. He translated some Acts in English to Telugu. He has given the knowledge about some acts to common people in Telugu language. In these acts "Hindu Law", "Local board Act" and "cooperative societies act" are familiar.

He has translated the bangla Novel Durgesh Nandini written by bankinchandra chaterjee to Telugu language in 1911.

He died in 1956.

== Contribution ==
- Andhra kavitarangini (1946–1953)
- Durgesanandini (Novel)
- Nawab Nandini (1949) (Novel)
- Viswaprayatnamu (Novel)
- Radharani (Novel)
- Sri (Novel)
- Chandrasenudu (Novel)
- Samishti kutumbamu
- Madras Local board act
- madras sahakara sanghamulu act
- Madras nootana grama panchayat act
