= Ernir Kristján Snorrason =

Ernir K. Snorrason (born Reykjavík, March 17, 1944, died Reykjavík, National Hospital, April 26, 2012), was an Icelandic psychiatrist and neuropsychologist, a co-founder of DeCODE genetics and two pharmaceutical companies, and a novelist and poet.

== Biography ==
Ernir was the son of Snorri Jónsson, a merchant, and Björg G. Kristjánsdóttir, a housewife. He grew up in Reykjavik, graduating in psychology in 1971 from the University of Strasbourg. He received a licence for general medical practice in Iceland in 1988, in Norway in 1993, and license as a specialist in psychiatry in 1994. Ernir worked in Iceland, France and Norway as a doctor, teacher, and running his own medical practice in the Domus Medica in Iceland.

Ernir founded the development company Taugagreiningar hf; was a co-founder of deCODE genetics in 1994; and founded the British drug-discovery company Hunter-Fleming in 1999, sitting on its board as director of development. Ernir produced a number of scholarly articles and patents.

Ernir was also an occasional novelist and poet. His last novel, which was partly about the 2008–11 Icelandic financial crisis, unusually was published not only after his death but actually on the day of his funeral (May 8, 2012). He was keen on horse-breeding.

He was married twice, the first marriage giving him three children; his second marriage two children, one of whom survived him.

== Books ==
Alongside a number of scholarly articles, and a few articles on artistic topics, Ernir wrote four books:

=== Fiction and poetry ===
- Bölverkssöngvar (Reykjavík: Helgafell, 1976)
- Óttar: skáldsaga (Reykjavík: Helgafell, 1977)
- Sýslumaðurinn sem sá álfa (Reykjavík: Sögur, 2012)

=== Scholarship ===
- Hópaflfræði: hópsálfræði, collected by Ernir Snorrason (Bifröst: Samvinnuskólinn, 1971)

== Sources ==
- "Andlát: Dr. Ernir K. Snorrason". Morgunblaðið (in Icelandic). April 30, 2012.
- Kristjánsson, Hörður (November 1, 2001). "Meðstofnandinn gerði dómsátt við deCODE: Barðist hart gegn miðlægum gagnagrunni—en segir ekkert lát af sinni hálfu á vinskap við Kára Stefánsson". Dagblaðið Vísir (in Icelandic). p. 5.
