= Béla Bevilaqua-Borsodi =

Hungarian cultural historian

Béla Bevilaqua-Borsodi (23 February 1885 – 12 March 1962) was a Hungarian cultural historian.

== Early life ==
Béla Borsody Bevilaqua was born in the town of Miskolc in Borsod county, in 1885. He was the great-grandson of Conte Joannis Petri Bevilaqua, who continued the Ramus Hungaricus branch of the Bevilaqua family. Borsody, Béla's middle name referred to the county in which he was born. His father, Rezső (Rudolf) Bevilaqua (1849-1896) was a teacher, lawyer, and postmaster general of Upper Hungary, who moved with his family to Buda in 1888, when Béla was three years old, with two elder sisters. The family first lived at an estate at 44 Iskola utca, but they soon moved to a larger estate on Szagényház utca (today's Varsányi Irén utca). Béla's mother was Mária Szentessy, sister of the poet Gyula Szentessy. Their father, Béla Borsody's grandfather, Daniel Szentessy (1805-1895), was a sword-forging master from the ruling family of the city of Szentes, who participated in the 1848 Hungarian Revolution, and was one of the Globetrotters that Béla Borsody wrote about in his book, Regi Magyar Vilagjrok (Hungarian Old World Travellers).

Béla Borsody Bevilaqua went to the Piarist elementary school in Pest, and the Evangelical grammar school in Késmárk. The costs of his education at this boarding school were covered by his foster-father, lawyer Lajos Nagy from Kossoncz, husband of his elder sister Hilda. Until the age of 12, Béla Bevilaqua always spent the whole year in Víziváros, then as a student in Késmárk, he spent every summer there.

Béla Borsody Bevilaqua finished his studies at the arts faculty of Pest University in 1908: his graduation paper, on the Rhetoric of Alexandros, was supervised by the classical philologist István Hegedűs. His doctoral thesis was completed in 1911. Béla Borsody's first job was as a museum assistant in the National Museum, and he became an under-keeper. He worked in Hungary's number one public collection from 1911 to 1914 in the library which became the predecessor of the National Széchenyi Library.

He was called to front service in the autumn of 1914: he was garrisoned in Kraków in 1916, and had served in Albania and Bosnia by 1918. Returning home from the war, he opened an antiquity shop in one of the Károlyi houses in the town centre, at 25 Veres Pálné utca. He lived at 65 Váci utca; but when he was an under-keeper, he was a tenant at 41 Liget utca in Kőbánya, and later at 14 Fortuna utca in Buda. He was trying to make a business of the antiquity shop until 1925, but without success. He subsequently found a job in the National Military Museum, and he worked there until 1931 in the position of a first assistant. He also attended medical university as a student in 1930 but did not complete his degree.

== Writing career ==
In 1935, Béla Borsody began his career as a writer, working primarily in coffee houses in Budapest.

Borsody secretly wrote a book during World War II called Német Maszlag Othotól Adolf Hitlerig 972-1945 published in Budapest by Magyar Téka in 1945. Nemet Maszlag means "He will take no lies" and the book is based on German data on the history of the German persecution of Hungarian Jews from the year 972, with a main focus on Adolf Hitler's atrocities. The International PEN Society awarded Borsody with their highest honor.

Borsordy was an expert on the history of Hungarian economics, and wrote a book called Régi és új Magyar Takácsmesterségek or Old and New Weaver Crafts of Hungary.

His book Magyar Gaudeamus or Old Hungarian Student Songs (1932) is about historical students' customs and songs of Hungary. It contains the lyrics of 32 songs with piano arrangements harmonized by composer and pianist Tibor Kazacsay. Borsodi also wrote a history of the observatory of Eger University, designed by the astronomer Maximilian Hell and built in 1776. The Spekula Observatory astronomical museum is located in the library tower, and Bevilaqua had a planet named after him for his book.

Themes of essays and monographs from BBB's early years covered the history of the malaria epidemic in Montenegro, Arthur Görgey's Frauenhoffer and Dollond telescopes, and the keys of castle gates. He was also an enthusiast for Hungarian puppetry art and identified historic artifacts in the royal graves at Székesfehérvár. Borsody also wrote operetta books and puppetry plays. In the 1950s, he was the founder and chairman of the Puppetry Artists' Association. In addition to writing he designed scenery, museum displays and architectural decoration.

Béla Bevilaqua also wrote about the cultural history of polo, and he wrote an opera libretto about Mátyás deák, a hero in legends and folktales. He worked on a novel called Wooden Sparrow, and the cultural history of spectacles. Although these books were almost entirely destroyed, Víziváros survived as a 600-page autobiography. Forty copies of Víziváros were retained by a Budapest cultural heritage society. These books were auctioned, and the income was spent on saving and renewing Borsody's memorial tomb in Kerepesi cemetery. The tomb was donated by the international PEN Society.

Béla Borsody's A Hungarian Memorial to Albrecht Dürer was written because of the close relationship between Dürer and the Bevilacqua family in Italy. Morando Bevilacqua's family had constructed a castle and a church to form the ancient nucleus of the city of Trento during Roman times.

== Personal life and death ==
As a university student, Béla Borsody "fought a duel of love", and was imprisoned in the state jail for a few days. His constant companion was Olga Finály, a teacher and poet more than 20 years his junior.

Béla Borsody's second wife, according to Pál Gulyás's biography, was Ella Weiss, who he married in the late 1920s. She must have died in the late 1950s, as the register of his third marriage shows that he was a widower when he got married for the third time.

Béla Borsody died from a cerebral hemorrhage on 12 March 1962, ten days after his fourth marriage to Magdolna Mányi, who he had first met as a student several decades earlier.

== Works ==
- Discovering Hungary
- The History of Hungarian Beer Brewing
- A Hungarian History in Anecdotes
- The History of Pest-Buda Cafés
- Old Hungarian World Travellers
- The History of the Observatory of Eger University
- The History of the Buda and Pest Butchers' Guilds 1270-1872
- Old Hungarian Student Songs
- German Anti Semitism from Otto I to Adolf Hitler 972-1945
- Old and New Weaver Crafts of Hungary, Budapest Coffee and Coffee Craft 1535-1935
- A Hungarian Memorial to Albrecht Dürer
- Víziváros, an amazingly accurate reflection of the last member of the Ramus Hungaricus Branch of the Bevilaqua family, describes Borsody's life and scholarly activities. Víziváros was preserved, discovered, and edited by Péter Buza, urban historian, and on his request, the manuscript has been published by the Town Protectors’ Association and Budapest Szabó Ervin Library in 2005.
- Hungarian Horse Racing and Breeding
