= Pam Scheunemann =

American children's writer (born 1955)

Pamela Jean Scheunemann Chenevert
- Born: October 25, 1955 (age 70); Minneapolis, Minnesota
- Occupations: writer, production manager
- Writing career
- Period: 1980–present
- Genre: Children's literature

Pamela Jean Scheunemann Chenevert (born October 25, 1955, in Minneapolis, Minnesota) is an American children's writer, best known for her Cool Crafts picture books and as the founding member of the Minnesota Book Builders.

== Life and work ==
Scheunemann graduated from Robbinsdale High School in 1973 and moved on to Minneapolis Community College to study English. She later attended the Minneapolis College of Art & Design for design coursework.

In 1980, Scheunemann took the position of production manager for New Homes Magazine and moved on to become the vice president for the company. After leaving the company in 1988, she became the production manager for Meadowbrook Press until 1990 and then for CompCare Publishers from 1990 to 1993.

Scheunemann started her career as a children's book author in 2000 with the Blends Series. Since then, she has published nearly 150 children's books, ranging in reading levels from first to sixth grades. She now serves as the office and production manager, as well as a writer for Mighty Media, inc. in Minneapolis, where she has been since 1993.

== Books ==
- Series: Time (Abdo Publishing, 2008)
  - Time to Learn About Day & Night (ABDO Publishing Company, 2010) ISBN 1617862827.
  - Time to Learn About Measuring Time
  - Time to Learn About Past, Present & Future
  - Time to Learn About Seasons & Years
  - Time to Learn About Seconds, Minutes & Hours
  - Time to Learn About Weeks & Months
- Series: Critter Chronicles (Abdo Publishing, 2007)
  - Crocodile Tears
  - Peacock Fan
  - Pelican’s Pouch
  - Spelling Bee
- Series: Cool Collections (Abdo Publishing, 2007)
  - Cool Coins
- Series: Animal Tales (Abdo Publishing, 2006)
  - Bear Claws
  - Cat Tails
  - Cow Licks
  - Pig Pens
- Series: First Words (Abdo Publishing, 2006)
  - Big Bug, Little Bug
  - Come and See My Game!
  - Come for a Party!
  - The Cow Said Meow!
  - Is This a Flower?
  - Look at Me!
  - Meg and I
  - The Puppy Is for Me!
  - Rainy Day
  - This Is Not My Dog!
  - We Like Music!
  - We Like to Play!
- Series: First Rhymes (Abdo Publishing, 2006)
  - The Band in the Sand
  - The Chick on the Thick Brick
  - Drew and the Crew
  - The Frog in the Clog
  - The King ona Spring
  - The One-Cent Tent
  - The Pot with a Dot
  - The Pug with a Mug
  - The Raccoon and the Balloon
  - The Skunk and His Junk
  - The Sub Club
  - Ted’s Red Sled
- Series: First Sounds (Abdo Publishing, 2005)
  - Skye and Skip
  - Sloane and Sly
  - Stacy and Steve
  - Tam and Tom
  - Tracy and Trevor
  - Ulma and Upton
  - Unity and Uri
  - Val and Vince
  - Wendy and Wally
  - Whitney and Wheeler
  - Yana and Yosef
  - Zoe and Zach
- Series: Rhyme Time (Abdo Publishing, 2005)
  - The Crain Loves Grain
  - Four Soar and Roar
  - Lou Flew Too!
  - Peas and Cheese
  - The Rare Fair
  - Tennis in Venice
- Series: Cool Crafts (Abdo Publishing, 2005)
  - Cool Beaded Jewelry
  - Cool Clay Projects
- Series: Rhyming Riddles (Abdo Publishing, 2004)
  - Ape Cape
  - Chipper Flipper
  - Cooler Ruler
  - Dill Spill
  - Loud Crowd
  - Overdue Kangaroo
- Series: Keeping the Peace (Abdo Publishing, 2004)
  - Acting With Kindness
  - Being a Peacekeeper
  - Coping with Anger
  - Dealing with Bullies
  - Learning About Differences
  - Working Together
- Series: United We Stand (Abdo Publishing, 2003)
  - Courage
  - Patriotism
  - Tolerance
- Series: Word Families (Abdo Publishing, 2003)
  - ent as in cent
  - ing as in king
  - ink a in drink
  - ick as in kick
  - unk as in skunk
  - ash as in trash
  - ack as in snack
  - aw as in paw
- Series: Homophones (Abdo Publishing, 2002)
  - Flour Does Not Flower
  - Fred Read the Red Book
  - Harry is Not Hairy
  - Sam Has a Sundae on Sunday
  - The Moose Is in the Mousse
  - Two Kids Got to Go, Too
- Series: Capital Letters (Abdo Publishing, 2001)
  - Cities
  - Days
  - Months
  - Names
  - Places
  - States
- Series: Blends (Abdo Publishing, 2000 and 2001)
  - dr
  - ght
  - sl
  - ch
  - st
