= Ian Stafford =

British sports commentator

Ian Stafford is an English sports journalist, author and broadcaster, whose work appears in the United Kingdom, in the United States and Australia. He is also an after dinner speaker, interviewer of stars and compere, acts as a consultant for a number of media outlets and owned and edited the UK's first general sports magazine on the internet, sportsvibe before selling it.

== Career ==
Stafford is an author of participatory books, including Playgrounds of the Gods (Mainstream, 1999), in which he played squash against Jansher Khan, boxed against Roy Jones Jr., was a substitute for the Springboks rugby team against Ireland, was 12th man for Australia in a one-day cricket international against New Zealand, ran in the Kenyan 3000 metres steeplechase national trials, and partnered rower Steve Redgrave at the Henley Royal Regatta. Playgrounds of the Gods was short-listed for the William Hill Sports Book of the Year. His second participatory book, In Your Dreams (Headline, 2001), saw him play football for Everton against Manchester City, sprint in the Norwich Union indoor athletics championships, be "Bomber" Pat Roach's tag wrestling partner, play rugby union for the Leicester Tigers against ULster, rugby league for Wigan against St Helens, cricket for Yorkshire and race for the Jaguar F1 team. In In Search of the Tiger (Ebury Press, 2003) he plays golf with Ernie Els, Bernhard Langer, Nick Faldo, Justin Rose and Jack Nicklaus before meeting Tiger Woods and in Who Do You Think You Are ... Michael Schumacher? (Ebury Press, 2006) he races with or against the likes of Juan Pablo Montoya, Jenson Button, David Coulthard and many others before a final, head to head with Michael Schumacher at the Race of Champions.
