= Miranda Shearer =

British author (born 1982)

Miranda Rose Shearer (born 11 May 1982) is an English author.

== Writings ==
Miranda Shearer has written two books. She wrote the first book My Turn To Cook at the age of 18 for her former boyfriend to take to university. It was re-published under the name Cheap as Chips, Better Than Toast: Easy Recipes for Students.

Her second book was written for her sister. Big Secrets for Not so Little Girls is described as written for “dazed and confused teenagers to twentysomethings, full of non-patronising advice on how to survive as a girl".

== Bibliography ==
- Shearer, Miranda (2002). My Turn to Cook: It's Cheap, Easy, Therapeutic and Satisfying. London: Cassell Illustrated. ISBN 0-304-36323-5.
- Shearer, Miranda (2004). Cheap as Chips, Better Than Toast: Easy Recipes for Students. London: Cassell Illustrated. ISBN 1-84403-263-9.
- Shearer, Miranda (2007). Big Secrets For Not So Little Girls. London: Weidenfeld & Nicolson. ISBN 978-0-297-84437-2.
