= Otto Steiger (writer) =

Otto Steiger (4 August 1909 – 10 May 2005) was a Swiss writer and radio news speaker.

== Biography ==
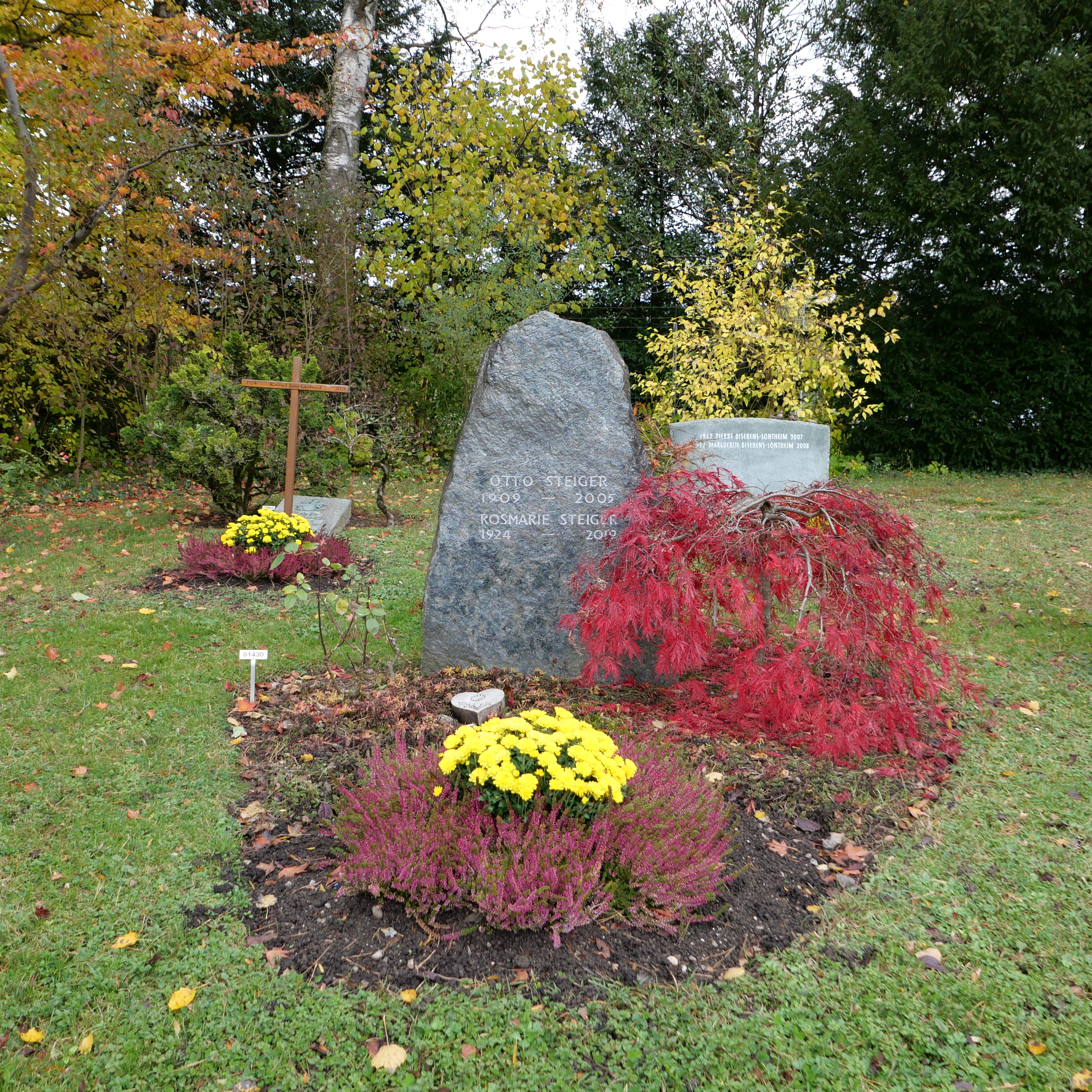
The grave of Steiger and his wife Rosmarie, née Salber (1924-2019), at the cemetery of Hönggerberg in Zurich.

Steiger was born in Uetendorf, Thun, Switzerland in 1909.

His third novel, Portrait of a respected man (1952), was condemned by critics as propaganda for communism. This book was translated into Russian without Steiger's knowledge and sold 300,000 copies.
