= Rapolas Šaltenis =

Lithuanian journalist

Rapolas Šaltenis (1908 near Utena, Lithuania – 2007) was a journalist, author, translator, and teacher.

He published his first book, a memoir entitled Aš - mokytojas (I - A Teacher) at the age of 74. He was a recipient of the Order of the Lithuanian Grand Duke Gediminas, Class V.
