= Nobility in Iceland =

Socially privileged class in Iceland

Nobility in Iceland (Icelandic: aðall; Norwegian: adel) may refer to the following:

- Icelanders who belonged to the aristocracy of the Icelandic Commonwealth.
- Icelanders who belonged to the Norwegian nobility.
- Icelanders who belonged to the Danish nobility.

== Aristocracy of the Icelandic Commonwealth ==
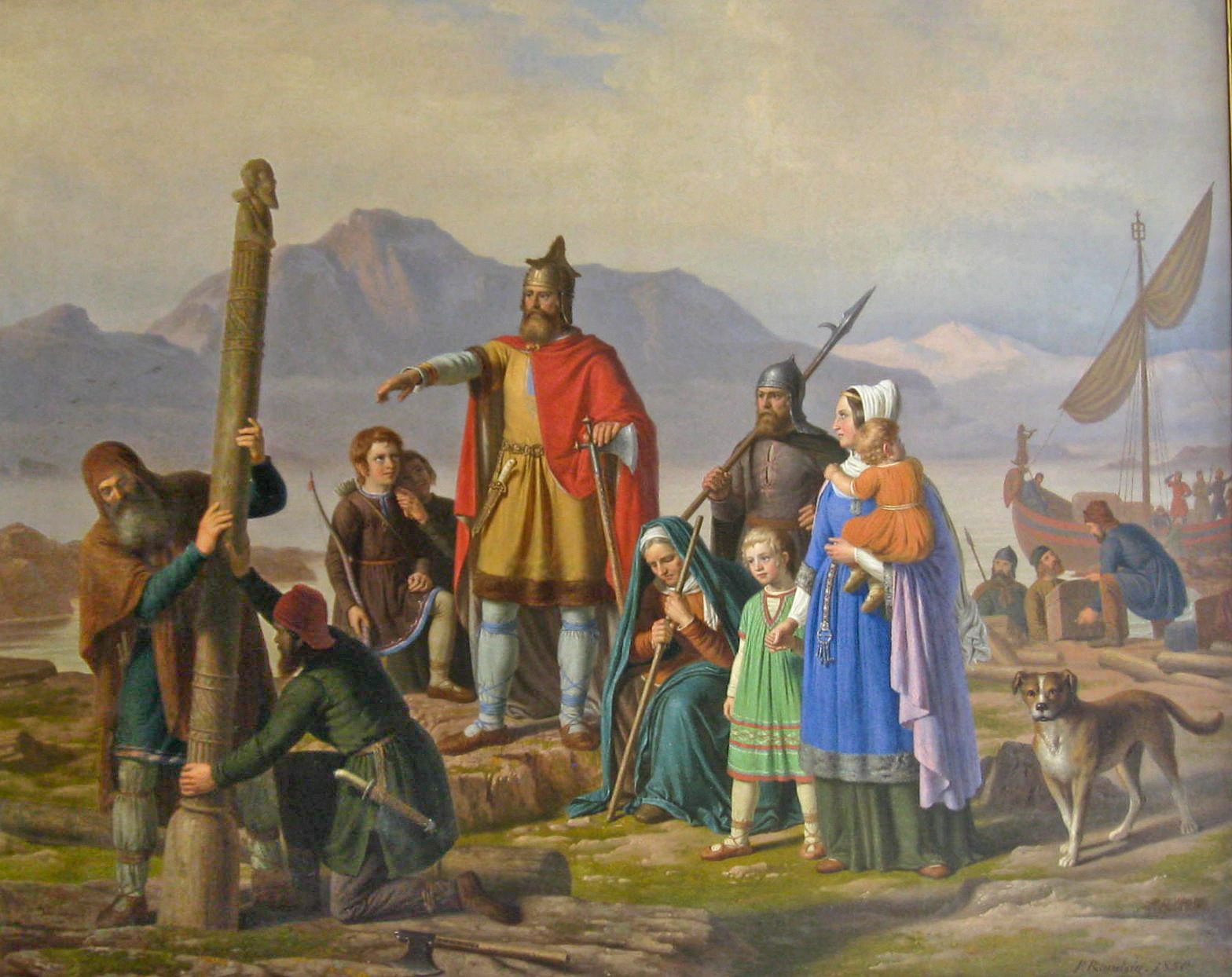
In this painting, painted in 1850 by Johan Peter Raadsig and depicting an imagined event, Norwegian Ingólfr Arnarson is depicted taking possession of the site of Reykjavík.

Coat of arms of the Earldom of Iceland; a variant of the Coat of arms of the Kingdom of Norway.

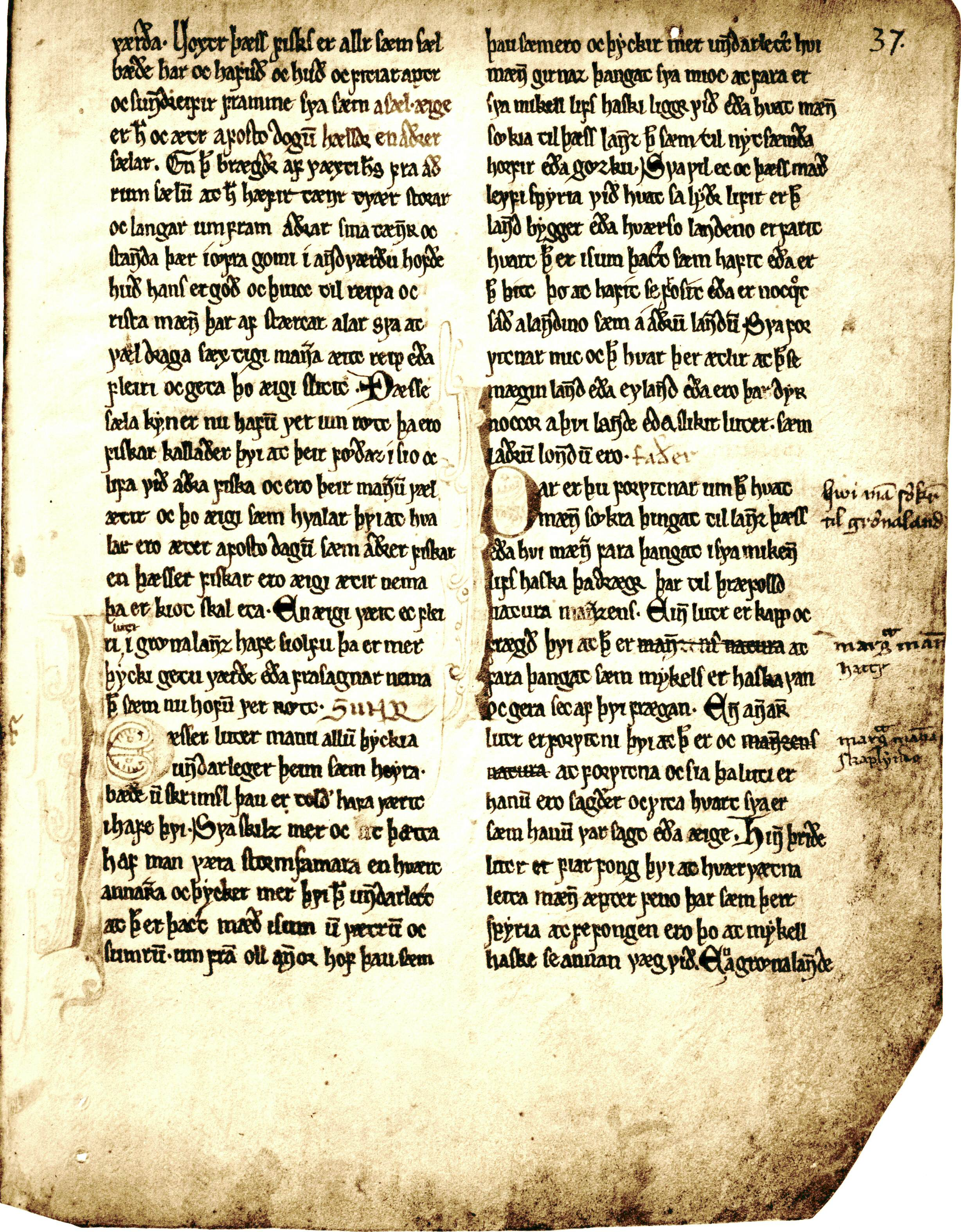
Original page from the King’s Mirror

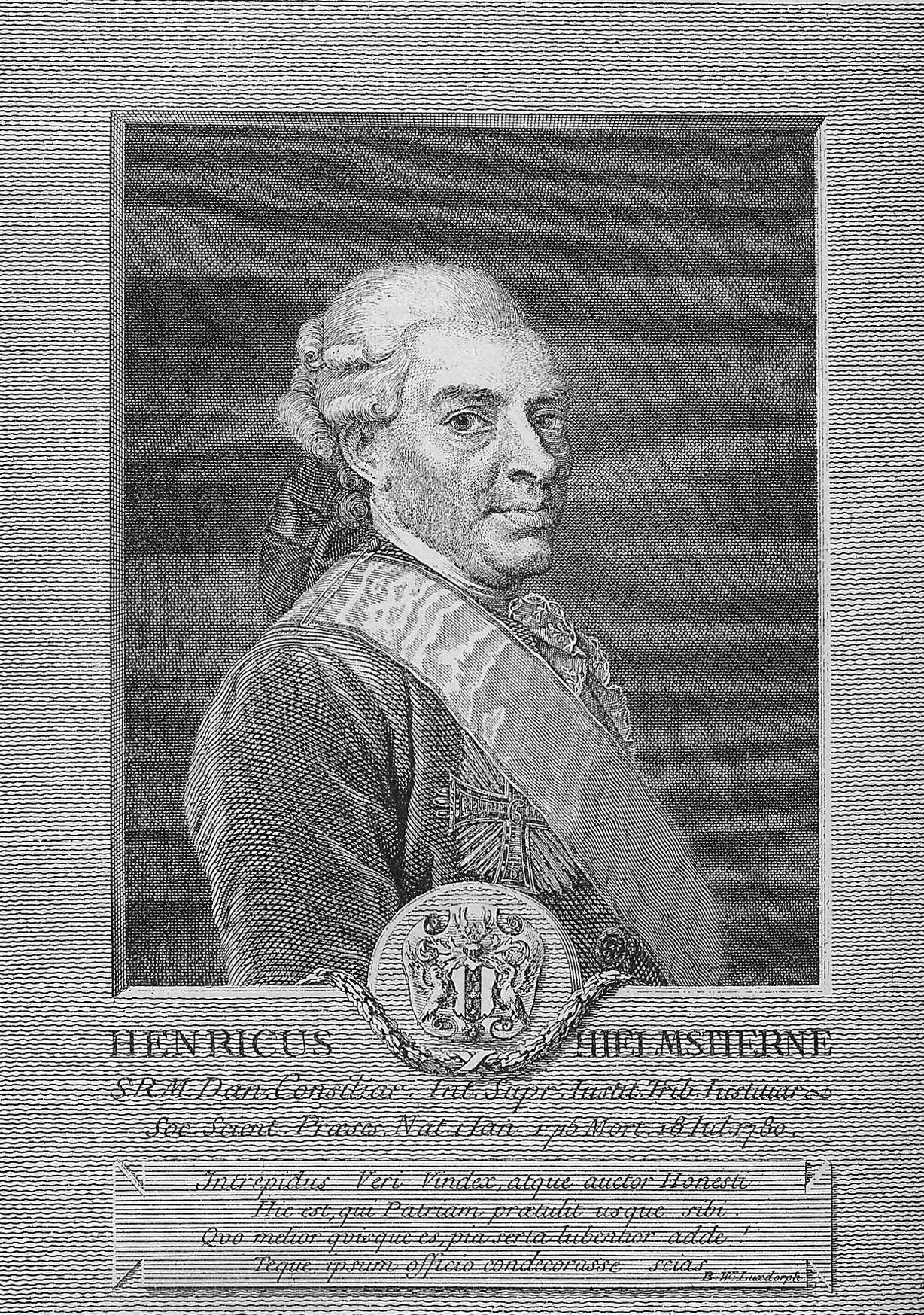
Icelandic–Danish Henrich Hielmstierne, a member of the Danish nobility

During the Norse settlement of Iceland, beginning in c. 874 and lasting until c. 930, chieftains and aristocratic families from Western and Northern Norway arrived to the island. They had refused to accept Harald I Halfdanson as their high king, instead abandoning their chieftain seats and petty kingdoms and heading west. One of these seats was Borg in Lofoten.

In the following centuries Iceland was ruled by a handful of aristocratic families, each controlling their respective part of the island, mainly the Sturlungar, the Ásbirningar, the Oddaverjar, the Haukdælir, the Vatnsfirðingar, and the Svínfellingar.

During this time a rich amount of poetry and literature was created, among others by poet Sighvatr Sturluson and by poet and historian Snorri Sturluson. The aforementioned families are extensively described in historical literature, for example in the Sturlunga saga.

== Norwegian nobility ==
Between 1262 and 1814, Iceland was a part of the Kingdom of Norway. The process that turned Iceland into a province had begun already in the 12th century. In the 12th and the 13th centuries several Icelandic men travelled to and were included at the Royal Court in Norway.

Jón Loftsson, Böðvar Þórðarson, Ormur Jónsson, Oddur Gissursson, and Gissur Hallsson are described as men ‘whom God has given the power over the people of Iceland’ in a letter of 1179 or 1180 by Eysteinn Erlendsson, Archbishop of Norway. Illustrating the growing connection between Iceland and Norway, Jón's mother was Þóra Magnúsdóttir, a daughter of King Magnus III Olafson of Norway.

In 1220, Snorri Sturluson, an adopted son of Jón and a member of the Sturlunga family, became a vassal of Haakon IV Haakonson of Norway. In 1235 Snorri's nephew Sturla Sighvatsson also accepted vassalage under the King of Norway. Unlike his uncle, Sturla worked actively for bringing Iceland under the Norwegian Crown, warring on chieftains who refused to accept the King's demands. However, Sturla and his father Sighvatr Sturluson were defeated by Gissur Þorvaldsson, the chief of the Haukdælir, and Kolbeinn the young, chief of the Ásbirnings, in the Battle of Örlygsstaðir, losing their position as the mightiest chieftains in Iceland.

In 1262, following the Old Covenant, the independent republic became an earldom under the Kingdom of Norway. Gissur Þorvaldsson of the Haukdælir was created Earl of Iceland in 1262, indicating and imposing that he should rule Iceland on behalf of Norway's king.

It is known that approximately 20–30 Icelandic men had the title of knight (Norwegian: ridder) in the following centuries, among others Eiríkur Sveinbjarnarson in Vatnsfjörður († in 1342) and Arnfinnur Þorsteinsson († in 1433). The first noble titles are known since 1277. These titles were normally not inherited, but rather expressed each person's function and rank as the King's servant.

The medieval aristocracy to which some Icelandics belonged was originally known as the hird. This was divided into three classes, of which the first had three ranks. The first class was hirdmann with lendmann as the 1st rank, skutilsvein as the 2nd rank, and ordinary hirdmann as the 3rd rank. Below them were the classes gjest and kjertesvein. The hird's organisation is described in the King’s Mirror and the Codex of the Hird.

During the second half of the 13th century continental European court culture began to gain influence in Norway. In 1277, King Magnus VI Haakonson of Norway introduced continental titles in the hird: lendmen were now called barons, and skutilsveins were called ridder. Both were then styled Herr (English: Lord). In 1308, King Haakon V Magnusson of Norway abolished the lendman/baron institution, and it was probably also during his reign that the aristocracy apparently was restructured into two classes: ridder (English: knight) and væpner (English: squire).

It is difficult to determinate exactly how many knights and squires there were in the 14th and the early 15th century in Norway. When King Haakon V signed a peace treaty with the Danish king in 1309, it was sealed by 29 Norwegian knights and squires. King Haakon promised that 270 more knights and squires would give their written recognition.

On 1 July 1620 at the Althing, Jón Magnússon the older let a letters patent of 1457 be read, given to his ancestor Björn ‘the Wealthy’ Þorleifsson from Christopher of Bavaria in his capacity as King of Norway. Jón was the last Norwegian nobleman in Iceland. The era of the nobility in Iceland ended in 1660 with the introduction of absolutism in Norway (and in Denmark).

In addition to the secular aristocracy there was a clerical one. Positions within the church were occupied mainly by members of the mightiest families in Iceland and in Norway. Both bishops in Iceland after 1262 had ‘seat and vote’ in the Norwegian Council of the Kingdom. There were also non-noble bishops, for example Pétur Nikúlásson biskup á Hólum (1391–1411), originally a Danish monk. The Archbishop of Nidaros had setesveins in Iceland. Two are mentioned in a list from 1533, whereof ‘Oluff Lagmand’, i.e. Ólafur lögmaður. This aristocracy ended with the Icelandic Reformation.

== Danish nobility ==
A few Icelanders (who formally were Norwegians until 1814) or Icelandic-rooted Danes have been ennobled or noble in Denmark. Prominent are the families Hielmstierne and Rosencrone.
