= Steinvör Sighvatsdóttir =

13th-century Icelandic skald

Steinvör Sighvatsdóttir (early 13th–century – 17 October 1271; Modern Icelandic: [ˈsteinˌvœːr ˈsɪɣˌkʰvatsˌtouhtɪr̥]; Old Norse: Steinvǫr Sighvatsdóttir [ˈstɛinˌwɔr ˈsiɣˌxwɑtsˈdoːtːez̠]), was the politically most influential woman in Iceland in the Age of the Sturlungs. She was also a skald and listed as such in Skáldatal. Most of what is known about Steinvör Sighvatsdóttir is told in Íslendinga saga, Þórðar saga kakala and Þorgils saga skarða, all of which are included in the Sturlunga Saga.

== Family ==
Steinvör's parents were Sighvatr Sturluson, leader of the Sturlungs, and Halldóra Tumadóttir (daughter of Tumi Kolbeinsson, head of the Ásbirningar family clan). Tumi's successor, Kolbeinn Tumason, was her uncle, and his successor, Kolbeinn ungi Arnórsson, was a cousin. Steinvör considered herself a Sturlung. She had two sisters and seven brothers including Sturla Sighvatsson and Þórðr kakali.

== Life ==
In 1230, Steinvör married Hálfdan Sæmundsson, the son of Sæmundr Jónsson, goði at Oddi. The couple settled on the estate Keldur in Rangárvellir. Hálfdan was, according to the Sturlunga Saga, a peaceful man who preferred the calm of his own farm to getting involved in contemporary politics. Steinvör, who supported the Sturlungs, seems to have put up with this – at least as long as her own dynasty prospered.

But in 1238 the Sturlungs suffered a crushing defeat in the battle of Örlygsstaðir, where Steinvör's father and four brothers were killed. When her brother Þórðr kakali returned four years later from Norway to take revenge and restore the lost power of the Sturlungs, he first sought refuge with his sister at Keldur. According to Þórðar saga kakala he reckoned that Steinvör "who was a very powerful woman, certainly would prompt her husband to act". So she did. She even threatened to hand over the fatabúr (storeroom) keys (i.e. the symbol of a married woman) to him and take up arms herself if he did not help her brother. The peaceful Hálfdan relented, but was still cautious and refused as long as possible to take open position in the conflict.

Steinvör was highly respected by her contemporaries and had a greater influence than most women in her days. This was clearly shown in the conflict between Þórðr kakali and the peasants of Southern Region in the autumn of 1242. Open assault at arms was averted when Steinvör and bishop Sigvarðr Þéttmarsson were chosen as mediators. The peasants agreed to a reconciliation provided that these two stipulated the conditions. But if also the mediators disagreed Steinvör alone would decide. Thus, the peasants had a greater trust in her than in their bishop.

At Þórðr kakali's death in 1256 Steinvör was sole heir. She then gave the estate Grund to her son-in-law Þorvarðr Þórarinsson of the Svínfellingar family clan, and set him to take charge of Þórðr's goðorð in Eyjafjörður. This led to a conflict between him and Þorgils skarði (a Sturlung), who also claimed power in the district. As a result, Þorvarðr treacherously ambushed and killed Þorgils on the night of January 22, 1258. For this outrage, however, he lost all reputation in the district and was soon driven away from Eyjafjörður. ´ Steinvör and Hálfdan had three sons: Loft, who became knight (riddari) at Grund, Sighvatr who became knight at Keldur, and Sturla.

== Poetry ==
Steinvör is a rare example of a woman whose name is included in the Skáldatal catalogue of court poets. She is said to have sung the praises of a chieftain called "Gautr on Melr" (died 1270), who was an ally of the Sturlungs. But nothing of this poem has survived. References to her in the Skáldatal claimed that her verse-making receive public recognition.

== Death ==
Her date of death is unknown but she is recording as being deceased as of 1271 with a date of death as October 17th.
