= 1238 =

1238 in various calendars
- Gregorian calendar: 1238; MCCXXXVIII
- Ab urbe condita: 1991
- Armenian calendar: 687; ԹՎ ՈՁԷ
- Assyrian calendar: 5988
- Balinese saka calendar: 1159–1160
- Bengali calendar: 644–645
- Berber calendar: 2188
- English Regnal year: 22 Hen. 3 – 23 Hen. 3
- Buddhist calendar: 1782
- Burmese calendar: 600
- Byzantine calendar: 6746–6747
- Chinese calendar: 丁酉年 (Fire Rooster); 3935 or 3728 — to — 戊戌年 (Earth Dog); 3936 or 3729
- Coptic calendar: 954–955
- Discordian calendar: 2404
- Ethiopian calendar: 1230–1231
- Hebrew calendar: 4998–4999
- Hindu calendars
- Vikram Samvat: 1294–1295
- Shaka Samvat: 1159–1160
- Kali Yuga: 4338–4339
- Holocene calendar: 11238
- Igbo calendar: 238–239
- Iranian calendar: 616–617
- Islamic calendar: 635–636
- Japanese calendar: Katei 4 / Ryakunin 1 (暦仁元年)
- Javanese calendar: 1147–1148
- Julian calendar: 1238; MCCXXXVIII
- Korean calendar: 3571
- Minguo calendar: 674 before ROC 民前674年
- Nanakshahi calendar: −230
- Thai solar calendar: 1780–1781
- Tibetan calendar: མེ་མོ་བྱ་ལོ་ (female Fire-Bird); 1364 or 983 or 211 — to — ས་ཕོ་ཁྱི་ལོ་ (male Earth-Dog); 1365 or 984 or 212

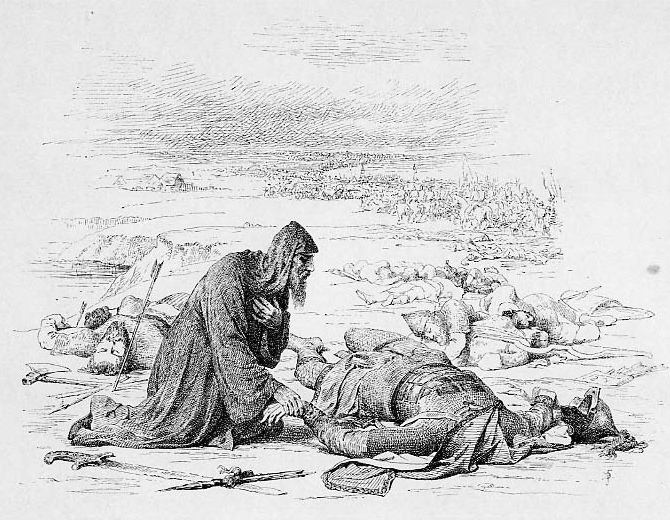
Grand Prince Yuri II of Vladimir (right) dies at the battle of the Sit River (1896)

Year 1238 (MCCXXXVIII) was a common year starting on Friday of the Julian calendar.

== Events ==
=== By place ===
==== Mongol Empire ====
- January 15–20 – Siege of Moscow: The Mongols under Batu Khan and Subutai campaign across the northern heartland of the Kievan Rus', committing numerous atrocities across multiple settlements, including the sacking of a then-insignificant Moscow. According to the Chronicle of Novgorod, Moscow is a fortified village, a trading post "on a crossroads of four rivers". The village is taken by the Mongols after 5 days of siege.
- March 4 – Battle of the Sit River: The Mongols defeat a Kievan Rus' army (some 4,000 men) under Grand Prince Yuri II of Vladimir in an engagement at the Sit River (located in the Sonkovsky District), in turn dashing any hope of a united Rus' resistance against the Mongols. Batu Khan splits his forces up into several contingents – ordering each to wreak havoc across the Rus' territories (modern-day Russia and Ukraine).
- March – Siege of Kozelsk: The 12-year-old Prince Vasily of Chernigov (grandson of Mstislav II Svyatoslavich), manages to hold out in his capital of Kozelsk for nearly two months with only citizen militia. He leads a successful sortie outside of the walls – where the garrison slaughters thousands of Mongols and destroys siege equipment. Finally, Kozelsk is conquered and Vasily is slaughtered alongside the inhabitants.
- Evpaty Kolovrat, Kievan knight (bogatyr), returns to his hometown of Ryazan, which was burnt to the ground by the Mongols in 1237. He gathers some 1,700 survivors and pursues Batu Khan, attacking his rearguard. Finally, Kolovrat is slain from afar by siege-weaponry. Batu Khan shows admiration for his bravery and as a sign of respect, returns his body and allows his soldiers to return home.
- Autumn – The Mongols under Batu Khan retire, leaving behind the ruined northern Rus' territories. He spends the rest of the year suppressing the last resistance of the Kipchaks, while his cousin Möngke (son of Tolui Khan) conquer the Alans and the northern Caucasian tribes. Later, Möngke makes a raid of reconnaissance as far as Kiev.

==== Europe ====
- June 8 – Treaty of Stensby: The Teutonic Knights sign an agreement with King Valdemar II of Denmark ("the Conqueror"). William of Modena, Italian papal diplomat, meets Grand Master Hermann Balk and Valdemar on a Danish island, settling outstanding disputes with Denmark. The Livonian Brothers of the Sword are merged into the Teutonic Order as an autonomous branch and become known as the Livonian Order.
- July 11 – Siege of Brescia: Emperor Frederick II begins the siege of Brescia. He rejects the negotiations of the Lombard League and insists on unconditional surrender to the imperial forces in northern Italy. This blocks all possibilities of a peaceful settlement. Milan and five other Lombard cities are attacked. In early October, after a successful sortie by the city's defenders, Frederick is forced to lift the siege.
- August 21 – Battle of Örlygsstaðir: Chieftain Sighvatr Sturluson and his son, Sturla Sighvatsson, are defeated by Kolbeinn ungi Arnórsson and Gissur Þorvaldsson, for control of Iceland (known as the Age of the Sturlungs).

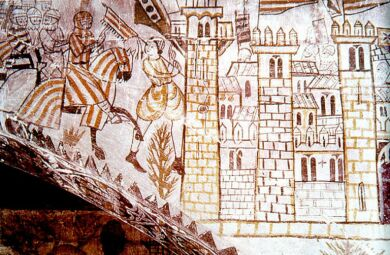
Conquest of Valencia (1238)

- September 28 – King James I of Aragon captures the city of Valencia from the Moors, who retreat to Granada. During the campaign, James' cousin, Bernat Guillem de Montpeller, dies from wounds received in action.
- Autumn – Muhammad I, Almohad ruler of the Emirate of Granada, begins the construction of the Alhambra Complex on the site of a pre-Islamic fortress.

==== England ====
- January – Simon de Montfort marries the 23-year-old Eleanor, sister of King Henry III. While the marriage takes place with the king's approval, the act itself is performed secretly and without consulting the barons. Eleanor has previously been married to William Marshal and has sworn a vow of perpetual chastity upon his death, which she breaks by marrying Montfort. Archbishop Edmund of Abingdon condemns the marriage for this reason.

==== Middle East ====
- March 6 – Al-Kamil, Ayyubid ruler of Egypt, dies at Damascus and is succeeded by his 18-year-old son Al-Adil II. After Al-Kamil's death, a civil war breaks out, and his elder son As-Salih Ayyub, sets out from Damascus to invade Egypt. But a sudden coup d'état dethrones him in favour of his uncle, As-Salih Ismail.
- The Nizari Imam Muhammad III and the Abbasid caliph Al-Mustansir send a joint diplomatic mission to the European kings Louis IX of France and Henry III of England to forge a Muslim–Christian alliance against the Mongols, but this is unsuccessful.

== Births ==
- March 12 – Serafina, Italian noblewoman and saint (d. 1253)
- April 23 – Narathihapate (or Sithu IV), Burmese ruler (d. 1287)
- May 1 – Magnus VI ("the Law-mender"), king of Norway (d. 1280)
- May 3 – Emilia Bicchieri, Italian nun and prioress (d. 1314)
- July 11 – Dafydd ap Gruffydd, prince of Wales (d. 1283)
- November – Henry de Montfort, English nobleman and knight (d. 1265)
- al-Bahrani, Arab Shia scholar and philosopher (d. 1280)
- Hōjō Nobutoki, Japanese nobleman and regent (d. 1323)
- Maurice FitzGerald, Irish nobleman and justiciar (d. 1277)
- Nizamuddin Auliya (or Awliya), Indian Sufi scholar (d. 1325)
- Rinchen Gyaltsen, Tibetan imperial preceptor (d. 1279)
- Yao Sui, Chinese politician, poet and writer (d. 1313)
- Yunus Emre, Seljuk poet, mystic and writer (d. 1328)
- Zhang Hongfan, Chinese general and admiral (d. 1280)
- approximate date
  - Guglielmo Agnelli, Italian sculptor and architect (d. 1313)
  - Meinhard II, duke of Carinthia (House of Gorizia) (d. 1295)
  - Nicholas Segrave, English nobleman and knight (d. 1295)
  - Otto de Grandson, Savoyard nobleman and knight (d. 1328)
  - Pedro Armengol, Spanish nobleman and priest (d. 1304)
  - Yang Hui, Chinese mathematician and writer (d. 1298)
- possible date – Madhvacharya, Indian Hindu religious leader (d. 1317)

== Deaths ==
- March 4
  - Joan of England, queen consort of Scotland (b. 1210)
  - Vasilko Konstantinovich, Kievan prince (b. 1209)
  - Yuri II of Vladimir, Kievan Grand Prince (b. 1188)
- March 6 – Al-Kamil, Ayyubid ruler of Egypt (b. 1177)
- March 16 – Benchō, Japanese Buddhist monk (b. 1162)
- March 19 – Henry the Bearded, duke of Poland
- March 21 – Awhad al-Din Kermani, Persian Sufi poet
- June 9 – Peter des Roches, bishop of Winchester
- July 9 – William de Malveisin, bishop of St. Andrews
- July 10 – Sophia of Wittelsbach, German noblewoman
- September 28 – Jeanne des Roches, French baroness
- November 11 – Matsudono Moroie, Japanese nobleman (b. 1172)
- December 26 – Alexander de Stavenby, English bishop
- Ibn Hud (Abu abd Allah Muhammad), Almohad ruler
- Evpaty Kolovrat, Kievan warrior and knight (b. 1200)
- Heinrich I von Müllenark, German archbishop (b. 1190)
- Hugh le Despenser, English nobleman and high sheriff
- Hugh of Ibelin ("the Strong"), Cypriot knight (b. 1213)
- John I of Trebizond (Axouchos Komnenos), Byzantine emperor
- John of Béthune, French military leader and knight
- approximate date – Azriel of Gerona, Catalan rabbi and scholar (b. 1160)
