= Battle of the Gulf =

Medieval Icelandic naval battle in 1244

Coordinates: 65°50′N 20°50′W

- Part of Age of the Sturlungs
Date	25 June 1244
Location	Húnaflói, Iceland
Result	Inconclusive

Belligerents
Sturlungar	Ásbirningar

Commanders and leaders
Þórður Sighvatsson	Kolbeinn Arnórsson

Strength
15 ships	20 ships

Casualties and losses
Unknown	Unknown

The Battle of the Gulf (Icelandic: Flóabardagi) was a naval battle on 25 June 1244 in Iceland's Húnaflói Bay, during the Age of the Sturlungs civil war. The conflicting parties were the followers of Þórður kakali Sighvatsson, a member of the Sturlungar family, and those of Kolbeinn ungi Arnórsson. Þórður's men were from the Westfjords of Iceland, while Kolbeinn's were northerners. The primary weapons were rocks hurled between boats. A detailed description of the battle can be found in Sturlunga saga.
