= Flugumýri Arson =

Targeted arson in Iceland, 1253

The Flugumýrarbrenna (English: the Flugumýri Arson) was a quickfire that took place 22 October 1253 in Iceland during the Age of the Sturlungs.

The powerful Icelandic goði (chieftain) Gissur Þorvaldsson had returned from Norway with the Norwegian King's favour, and had settled in Flugumýri, an old homestead in Blönduhlíð in Skagafjörður where the chieftains of the Ásbirningar held their seat.

Gissur was at this time engaged in making amends and settling his quarrels with the Sturlungar clan. Not all the followers of the Sturlungar were ready to forgive and forget. On 22 October 1253, Eyjólfur ofsi Þorsteinsson and his followers put Flugumýri to the torch and clashed with Gissur and his men. Eyjólfur was seeking vengeance for his expulsion from Skagafjörður and for the death of his father-in-law Sturla Sighvatsson who had died in the Battle of Örlygsstaðir at the hands of Gissur and his men. 25 people died in the ensuing fire and conflict, including Gissur's wife Gróa and their sons. Gissur himself escaped death by hiding in a barrel of sour whey and wrought vengeance on those involved, but Eyjólfur, the leader of the attackers, escaped him. Eyjólfur would later fall in the Battle of Þverá on 15 May 1255.

The Flugumýri Arson lived for a long time in folk tales, and some scholars believe that it was inspired by the arson in Njáls saga (or vice versa).
