= Halldóra Tumadóttir =

Icelandic politician (1180–1247)

Halldóra Tumadóttir (Old Norse: [ˈhɑlːˌdoːrɑ ˈtumɑˌdoːtːez̠]; Modern Icelandic: [ˈhaltouːra ˈtʰʏːmaˌtouhtɪr̥]; 1180–1247) was a politically active Icelandic woman, wife of Sighvatr Sturluson and sister of Kolbeinn Tumason; she became the mother of Sturla Sighvatsson. She is portrayed as a minor figure, but an important one, in the political wars and feuds on Iceland during the Age of the Sturlungs. Her marriage in 1215 was a political match which brought peace between her two families.

Tumadóttir's husband and four of her sons were killed in 1238 in the Battle of Örlygsstaðir. She and her surviving young son, Tumi, were compelled to move from the family's home, Grund, in Eyjafjörður to one where Kolbeinn ungi Arnórsson, Tumadóttir's nephew and her husband's killer, could monitor them.

Halldóra's daughter, Steinvör Sighvatsdóttir (c. 1205 – 1271) married Hálfdan, son of Sæmundr Jónsson, and was an active participant in politics during the Icelandic Commonwealth period. She was the legally designed heir of her brother, Þórður kakali Sighvatsson, who had no legitimate children.
