= Guðný Böðvarsdóttir =

Icelandic farm manager and Sturlung matriarch (c. 1142 – 1221)

Guðný Böðvarsdóttir (c. 1142 – 1221) was an Icelandic farm manager and matriarch in the Sturlungar clan. Her three sons, Þórðr, Sighvatr, and Snorri Sturluson, were important chieftains in the Age of the Sturlungs and its violent feuds. A manager of farms at Hvamm, Staðr, Eyri, and Reykholt, she appears as a character in Sturlunga saga and Eyrbyggja saga.

== Family ==
Descended from the tenth-century poet Egill Skallagrímsson, she was the daughter of Böðvar Þórðarson. She married chieftain Hvamm-Sturla in 1160. She was in her late teens and Sturla, in his forties, had already had one wife and multiple children by his mistresses, and he had more illegitimate children during his marriage to Guðný. Guðný and Hvamm-Sturla had three sons: Þórðr, Sighvatr, and Snorri. Their daughters were Vigdís and Helga. Lewis-Simpson suggests that the children's names came from Guðný's ancestors because they were more important than her husband's.

She appears throughout Hvamm-Sturlu saga, managing the household and trying to temper her husbands’ feuds.

After Sturla's death in 1183, she travelled to Norway with Ari sterki, father-in-law of her eldest son, and returned to Iceland after Ari's death to reclaim her farm at Hvamm.

Guðný had control over her sons’ property, and spent Snorri's inheritance herself while he was being fostered at Oddi by Jón Loptsson. This left Snorri without a bride-price for his marriage to Herdís Bersadóttir in 1199, so Guðný raised the money for him. Snorri returned to Oddi, but later reconciled with his mother.

According to Eyrbyggja saga, she was present when the bones of Þórdís Súrsdóttir, an ancestor of her husband, were dug up from under a church her son Snorri had built.

Her eldest son Þórðr placed her in charge of his farms at Staðr and Eyri. In 1218, when she was in her seventies, Snorri gave her control of his estate at Reykholt in his absence. After his return, she remained at Reykholt with him until her death.

== Death and legacy ==
Guðný fostered her grandson Sturla Þórðarson, an illegitimate child of her eldest son Þórðr, and bequeathed her considerable wealth to him on her death. However, she died in Snorri Sturluson's house, so he took the money himself. Sturla named one of his daughters Guðný, probably in her honour.

Her death is recorded in most Icelandic annals.
