= Árni beiskur =

Icelandic assassin (died 1253)

Árni beiskur or Árni the Bitter (died 22 October 1253; Modern Icelandic: [ˈau(r)tnɪ ˈpeiskʏr̥]; Old Norse: Árni beiskr [ˈɑːrne ˈbɛiskz̠]) was an Icelander. He was a follower of Gissur Þorvaldsson who undertook the task of killing Snorri Sturluson.

== Biography ==
Árni was among the seventy men led by Gissur who assassinated Snorri Sturluson in his house at Reykholt in the autumn of 1241. There, Símon knútur asked Árni to kill him. Then Snorri said: Eigi skal hǫggva! – "Do not strike!" Símon answered: Hǫgg þú! — "You strike now!" Snorri replied: Eigi skal hǫggva! – "Do not strike!" and these were his last words.

Árni was captured in an unrelated battle and executed (Flugumýrarbrenna) for killing Snorri in 1253. He did not ask for mercy, and the last words spoken of him were those of Kolbeinn Dufgusson: Nobody remembers Snorri Sturluson, if you are to be spared.

Árni beiskur is otherwise an obscure character in Icelandic history. In the words of Íslendinga saga, after he had run out from Flugumýrarbrenna, being aged, he stumbled and lay defenseless: Árni beiskur is here, says he, and I will not ask for clemency. I also see that not far from me lies another whom I wish to follow. (The one lying beside him was Hallur Gissurarson, son of Gissur Þorvaldsson).
