= Ingunn Arnórsdóttir =

12-century Icelandic classicist scholar

Ingunn Arnórsdóttir (12th century; Old Norse: [ˈiŋɡuːn ˈɑrnˌoːrsˌdoːtːir]; Modern Icelandic: [ˈiŋkʏn ˈa(r)tnˌour̥sˌtouhtɪr̥]), was an Icelandic scholar. She belonged to the Ásbirningar family clan and was the daughter of Arnór Ásbjarnarson and sister of Kolbeinn Arnórsson. She was the first woman in Iceland to receive a formal academic education and to serve as a teacher.

Ingunn Arnórsdóttir was a student at the Latin school of Bishop Jón Ögmundsson (reign 1106–1121) at Hólar. She was the only female student at the school and the first woman in Iceland to study Latin and have an academic education. After having completed her studies, she became a teacher at the school. She is said to have taught many Icelandic men, two of whom later became bishops.

Jóns saga ins helga mentions Ingunn Arnórsdóttir in a description of the students who attended the school at Hólar. She is described as a young, orderly, female student called Ingunn who was in every way an equal to the male students, and a generous teacher who taught many students grammar. She is also said to have sewed and done various other handiwork related to the Saints' sagas. Ingunn Arnórsdóttir was also one of the sources for Ólafs saga Tryggvasonar, a biography of the Norwegian King Olaf Tryggvason, written by the 12th century monk Oddur Snorrason at Þingeyrar.

In 2017, The Reykjavík city executive council decided to name one of the streets in Vatnsmýri designated for student housing Ingunnargata after Ingunn Arnórsdóttir.
