= Þórir Jökull Steinfinnsson =

13th-century Icelandic warrior

Þórir jökull Steinfinnsson was an Icelandic 13th century warrior and possibly a skald.

== Overview ==
=== Life ===
Þórir was captured following the Battle of Örlygsstaðir, fought on August 21, 1238. He was executed along with five others, whose names are recorded in the Íslendinga saga, included in the Sturlunga saga. Also given are the names of the about fifty combatants who were killed on that day. Þórir’s executioner was a man allowed to perform the execution to avenge Þórir’s killing of his brother at the Battle of Bær, which occurred on April 28, 1237.

=== Poem ===
Þórir is known for a poem he recited before his execution.

Upp skal á kjöl klífa, köld er sjávar drífa. Kostaðu hug að herða, hér skaltu lífið verða. Skafl beygjattu skalli, þótt skúr á þig falli. Ást hafðir þú meyja, eitt sinn skal hver deyja.: The text in Modern Icelandic spelling	Onto the keel you climb, Cold is the ocean brine. Keeping courage though, Locked in a deadly throe. Baldhead, show no fear, showers fall on you here. With maidens you had a way, All must die one day.: A translation from an unknown source

Up on the keel you shall climb, cold is the spray of the brine. Strive to brazen your heart, here your life shall depart. Be not downcast, though rain falls on your balding crown. Maids loved you in your day. Some time each man shall die.: Another translation	Climb on the keel the sea spray is cold. Try to keep your courage up here you will lose your life. Don’t make a horseshoe [i.e., don’t turn down the corners of your mouth] even though the shower rains upon you. You had the love of maidens each must die at some time.: Translation by Einar R. Kvaran

=== References ===
- Faulkes, Anthony (1993). What Was Viking Poetry For?. University of Birmingham. ISBN 0-7044-1395-7
- Jón Jóhannesson, Magnus Finnbogason and Kristján Eldjárn, editors, Sturlunga Saga, Vol 1 & 2, Sturlunguútgáfan, Reykjavík, 1946
