= Sturla Þórðarson =

Icelandic chieftain and writer (1214–1284)

Sturla Þórðarson (Old Norse pronunciation: [ˈsturlɑ ˈθoːrðɑrˌson]; Icelandic pronunciation: [ˈstʏ(r)tla ˈθourðarˌsɔːn]; 29 July 1214 – 30 July 1284) was an Icelandic chieftain and writer of sagas and contemporary history during the 13th century. Much academic debate is dedicated to evaluating his life and his biases as an historian of medieval Iceland and Norway.

== Biography ==
The life of Sturla Þórðarson was chronicled in the Sturlunga saga. Sturla was the son of Icelandic chieftain Þórður Sturluson and his mistress Þóra, and grandson of Sturla Þórðarson the elder. He was raised by his grandmother, Guðný Böðvarsdóttir. He was a nephew and pupil of the famous saga-writer Snorri Sturluson. His brother was Icelandic skald and scholar Ólafur Þórðarson hvítaskáld.

He fought alongside Þórður kakali Sighvatsson during the Age of the Sturlungs. Sturla was appointed law speaker over all of Iceland for a brief period after the dissolution of the Icelandic Commonwealth, and wrote the law book Járnsíða.

Like his uncle, Snorri, and his brother, Óláfr, Sturla was a prolific poet. He is reported in Sturlu þáttr as telling a saga called Huldar saga. He is best known for writing Íslendinga saga, the longest saga within Sturlunga saga, and Hákonar saga Hákonarsonar, the story of Haakon IV of Norway. He also wrote a saga of Haakon's son, Magnus the lawmender (Magnúss saga lagabœtis), of which only fragments have survived. Some scholars also believe him to have written Kristni saga and Sturlubók, a transcript of Landnáma. He is moreover listed in Skáldatal as the court skald of the Swedish ruler Birger Jarl.

== Other sources ==
- Jón Viðar Sigurðsson; Sverrir Jakobsson (2017) Sturla Þórðarson: Skald, Chieftain and Lawman (Boston: Brill) ISBN 9789004342361
