= Þórður kakali Sighvatsson =

Icelandic chieftain (c. 1210 – 1256)

Þórður kakali Sighvatsson (Note: The nickname kakali probably means "The Stammerer", although Cleasby-Vigfússon and Elizabeth Ashman-Rowe translate it as "the Claypot".) (c. 1210 – 1256) was a 13th-century Icelandic chieftain during the Age of the Sturlungs. He was the son of Sighvatur Sturluson, Snorri Sturluson's brother, and Halldóra Tumadóttir.

Following his brother Sturla's death in the Battle of Örlygsstaðir in 1238, Þórður returned home from Norway (about 1242). Over the next few years he travelled round Iceland, gathering forces to both secure his own life and in order to avenge his family.

In 1244, Þórður was stationed in Westfjords and decided to try to go back to claim his family's land around Eyjafjörður. He went by sea with his men on small barques. He had not gone far when he came across the force of Kolbeinn the Young, which was larger than his own, and they fought Iceland's only noteworthy sea battle, Flóabardagi. The outcome of the battle was an "uneven tie". Both survived the conflict, and went on their way, but Kolbeinn's army had suffered greater casualties.

A year later, in 1245, Kolbeinn the Young died, and Brandur Kolbeinsson took command of the Ásbirningar family. Meanwhile, the forces of Þórður continued to grow, and he confronted Brandur in 1246 in the Battle of Haugsnes, the bloodiest conflict ever to be fought in Iceland, where about 100 men perished. The battle's outcome was in the favor of Þórður, which made him the most powerful man in Iceland. In 1250, however, Þórður was called back to Norway by King Haakon IV, as he wanted to have the most powerful Icelander of the time within reach. Six years later Þórður died in Norway, after having received the news that he would, after all, be sent back to Iceland.
