= Bóndi =

Norse core of society

Bóndi (also húsbóndi, (pl.) bændr in Old Norse) was the Norse core of society, formed by farmers and craftsmen in the Scandinavian Viking Age, and constituted a widespread middle class. They were free men and enjoyed rights such as the use of weapons and the privilege to join the Thing as farm-owning landlords.

The profile is specified in Rígsthula, a Scandinavian legend describing the god Ríg lying with three couples to procreate and give birth to the three social classes: thralls, karls (or bændr) and jarls. The poem describes the image and behavior as it should be, and the type of work expected at each.

== Karl ==
The Norse mythology cites Karl as a result of the illicit relationship between god Heimdal and mortal Amma. Karl and his wife Snor would be progenitors of the peasants and freemen. The odalsbóndi (owner with hereditary possessions) could give up some of their land to other karls in exchange for loyalty and unconditional support whenever necessary. However, the term karl in some ancient writings denoting a free man status of low social class without access to family ties with upper castes or royalty.

== Sailors and traders ==
The bóndi had parallel activities; were great sailors, merchants, and Vikings; in areas further north also hunters and fishermen. With their snekke for war and knarr to trade, Vikings virtually dominating the seas in northern Europe. Sometimes hackers and other traders, according to circumstances. It is in 873, despite the mutual distrust between the Vikings and the Carolingian Empire, both parts came to an agreement that the merchants could cross borders in order to buy and sell goods in good will. Birka and Hedeby become two important enclaves and trade routes of the time.

== Iceland ==
In the icelandic Commonwealth, a bóndi figure was subject to the authority of a goði so their rights as free men were subject by law to a minimum in properties (a cow, a boat or a network for each family member) and establish a formal relationship with the goði, thereafter a bóndi formally considered a follower and his vote as Þingmaðr ("men of thing") was influenced by the will of goði in the Althing. These conditions were regulated by the Icelandic law collected in the Grágás.
