= Battle of Haugsnes =

Battle in 1246 in Iceland

Coordinates: 65.8333°N 23.25°W

- Part of Age of the Sturlungs
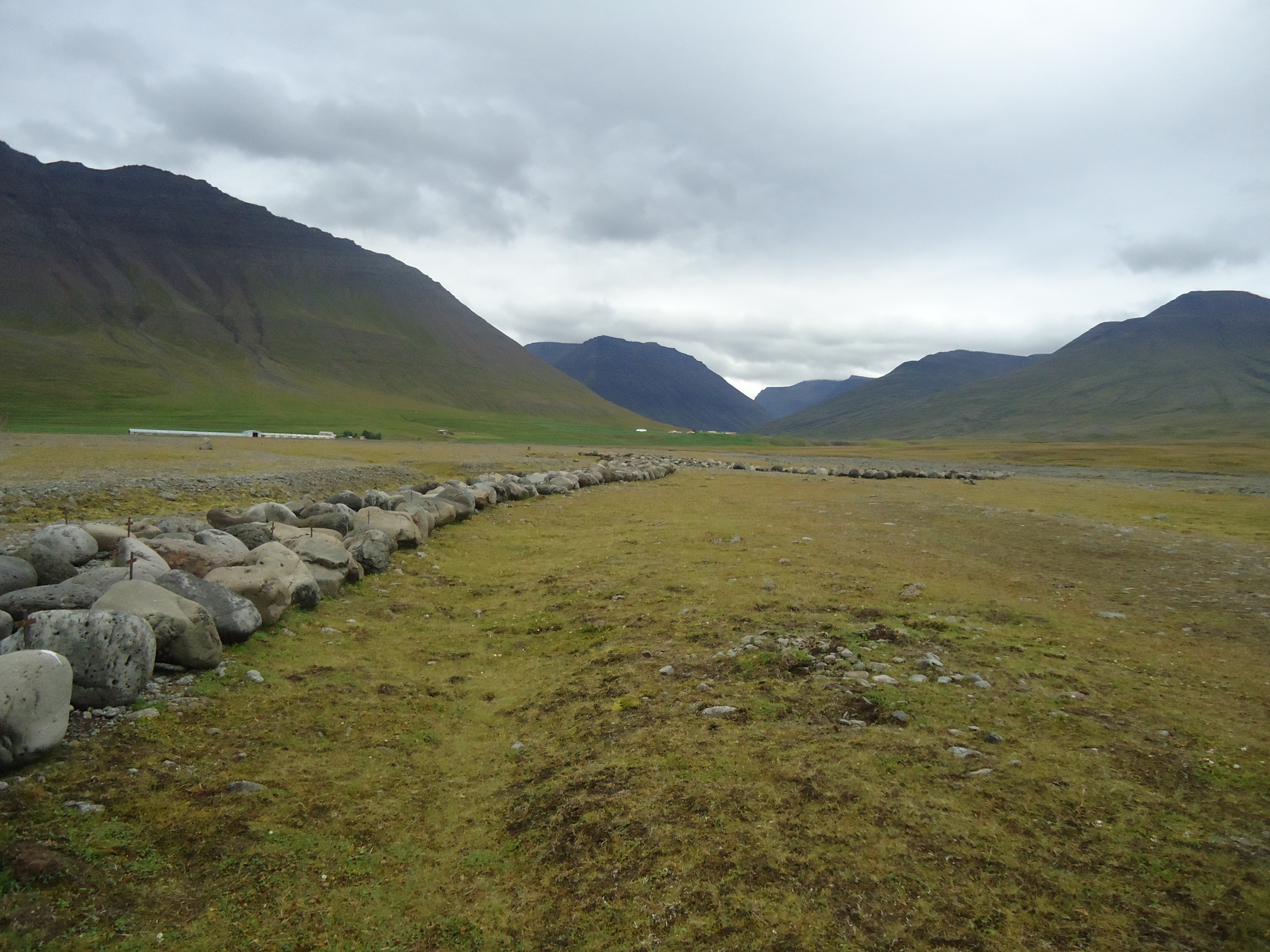
- The site of the battle. 1100 boulders have been arranged in battle order, each representing a combatant.
Date	19 April 1246
Location	Haugsnes, Iceland
Result	Sturlungar victory

Belligerents
Sturlungar	Ásbirningar

Commanders and leaders
Þórður Sighvatsson	Brandur Kolbeinsson †

Strength
~500	~600

Casualties and losses
~40	~70

The Battle of Haugsnes (Icelandic: Haugsnesbardagi) was fought at Haugsnes, a low peninsula south of Flugumýri in Skagafjörður, Northern Iceland. The battle took place on April 19, 1246, between the forces of Þórður kakali Sighvatsson and those of Brandur Kolbeinsson. Þórður was victorious. It was the bloodiest battle ever to be fought in Icelandic history, with about 110 casualties in total, amongst them Brandur Kolbeinsson, chieftain of the Ásbirningar family clan. Defeat in battle led to the end of power for the Ásbirningar.

The artist and farmer Sigurður Hansen of Kringlumýri created a memorial for the battle at the site, consisting of more than 1100 boulders in battle order, each representing a combatant. Those who fell are marked with iron crosses.
