= Commonwealth period =

A number of countries have had a period of history during which they were a Commonwealth:

- Commonwealth of England (1649-1660)
- Commonwealth of the Philippines (1935-1946)
- Icelandic Commonwealth (930-1262)
