= Huldar saga =

Huldar saga is the name of a lost Icelandic saga said to have been told by Sturla Þórðarson in 1263. Though the saga is no longer extant, the account of its telling has attracted extensive commentary as a rare account of medieval Icelandic saga-performance.

Huldar saga is also one of the names of at least one post-medieval Icelandic saga in the same genre.

== Sturla Þórðarson's Huldar saga ==
This medieval Huldar saga is mentioned in Sturlu þáttr, a short tale about Sturla Þórðarson that survives only in the version of Sturlunga saga attested in the manuscript Reykjafjarðarbók, indicating that it does not belong to the written archetype of the saga. It depicts Sturla winning the favour of King Magnus VI of Norway through his storytelling; in this, it is similar to many of the Íslendingaþættir. It is assumed that the saga was akin to the fornaldarsögur, but there is debate as to whether Sturla knew it only orally or whether it was ever written (before his time or after). It has been suggested that the eponymous Huld is identical to a character in Ynglinga saga, but this is not certain. The passage is noted as a rare account of medieval Icelandic saga-performance, composed only about thirty-five years after the event is claimed to have taken place. It also seems to witness the existence of a lost *Huldar saga.

The context for the passage is that King Hákon IV of Norway is on campaign in Scotland. Learning that Hákon's son Magnús is now ruling in Norway, an impoverished Sturla decides he needs to ingratiate himself with the new king. He sails to Bergen, but is not received warmly by Magnús, who merely promises not to kill him. Magnús then has Sturla accompany him and the court on a voyage southwards.

En er menn lögðust til svefns, þá spurði stafnbúi konungs, hverr skemmta skyldi. Flestir létu hljótt yfir því.
Þá mælti hann: "Sturla inn íslenzki, viltu skemmta?"
"Ráð þú," segir Sturla.
Sagði hann þá Huldar sögu — betr ok fróðligar en nökkurr þeira hafði fyrr heyrt, er þar váru. Þröngdust þá margir fram á þiljurnar ok vildu heyra sem gerst. Varð þar þröng mikil.
Dróttning spurði: "Hvat þröng er þar fram á þiljunum?"
Maðr segir: "Þar vilja menn heyra til sögu, er hann íslendingrinn segir."
Hon mælti: "Hvat sögu er þat?"
Hann svaraði: "Þat er frá tröllkonu mikilli, ok er góð sagan, enda er vel frá sagt."
Konungr bað hana gefa at þessu engan gaum ok sofa.
Hon mælti: "Þat ætla ek, at íslendingr þessi muni vera góðr drengr ok sakaðr minnr en flutt hefir verit."
Konungr þagði.
Sváfu menn þá af nóttina.
En um morgininn eftir var engi byrr, ok lá konungr í sama lægi.
En er menn sátu at drykk um daginn, sendi konungr Sturlu sendingar af borði.
Mötunautar Sturlu urðu við þetta glaðir, — "ok hlýzt betra af þér en vér hugðum, ef slíkt venst oft á."
En er menn váru mettir, sendi dróttning eftir Sturlu, bað hann koma til sín ok hafa með sér tröllkonusöguna.
Gekk þá Sturla aftr í lyftingina ok kvaddi konung ok dróttningina.
Konungr tók kveðju hans lágt, en dróttning vel ok léttiliga. Bað dróttning hann segja þá sömu sögu, er hann hafði sagt um kveldit.
Hann gerði svá ok sagði mikinn hluta dags sögu. En er hann hafði sagt, þakkaði dróttning honum ok margir aðrir ok þóttust skilja, at hann var fróðr maðr ok vitr.
En konungr svarar engu ok brosti at nökkut svá.

But when people lay down to sleep, the King's helmsman asked who would provide entertainment. Most were silent on that.

Then he said, "Sturla the Icelander, do you want to try?"

"you decide", says Sturla.

Then he recounted Huldar saga — better and more sagaciously than any of the people who were there had previously heard. Then many of them crowded forward on the deck-planks, wanting to hear what happened. A great crowd formed there.

The Queen asked "What is that crowd out on deck?"

Someone says "People there want to hear the saga which that Icelander is telling".

She said "What saga is that?"

He replied: "It's about a great troll-woman, and it's a good saga, and moreover it's well told".

The King told her to pay it no attention and to sleep.

She said: "I think that this Icelander must a good chap, and less blameworthy than reported."

The king fell silent.

Then everyone slept the night through.

But the next morning, there was no breeze, and the King was still in the same spot.

But when, during the day, everyone was sitting and drinking, the King sent Sturla some offerings from the table.

Sturla's dinner-companions were pleased about this — "and you're better news than we thought, if he makes a habit of this".

And once everyone had eaten, the Queen sent for Sturla, asked her to come to her, and bring the troll-woman story with him.

Then Sturla went back to the quarter-deck and greeted the King and Queen.

The King showed little pleasure at his greeting, but the Queen received it well and without concern. The Queen asked him to tell the same story which he had told the evening before.

He did so and told it for a large part of the day. And when he was done, the Queen and many others thanked him, and perceived that he was a wise and experienced person.

But the King didn't reply, and smiled a little.

== The eighteenth-century Sagan af Huld hinni miklu ==
The name Huldar saga is also borne by a saga first witnessed in eighteenth-century manuscripts and known as Sagan af Huld hinni miklu. Modern scholars do not believe it is related to Sturla's tale; Matthew Driscoll has indeed characterised it as 'an 18th-century reconstruction' of Sturla's tale. At least twenty-one manuscripts of the saga are known. The saga was printed in Reykjavík in 1909 as Sagan af Huld drottningu hinni ríku ('the saga of Queen Huld the Powerful') and as Sagan af Huld hinni miklu og fjölkunnugu trölldrottningu ('the saga of Huld the Great and the magical troll-queen') and published in Akureyri in 1911.
