= Saga of Icelanders =

Saga of Icelanders may refer to:

- Sagas of Icelanders – The stories based on historical events from 9th, 10th, and 11th century Iceland.
- The saga of Icelanders (Íslendinga saga) – A part of Sturlunga saga. Based on historical events from 13th century Iceland.
