= Skapti Þóroddsson =

Icelandic lawspeaker and skald

Skapti Þóroddsson (Old Norse: [ˈskɑpte ˈθoːrˌodːsˌson]; Modern Icelandic: Skafti Þóroddsson [ˈskaftɪ ˈθouːrˌɔtsˌsɔːn]; died 1030) was an Icelandic lawspeaker and skald. He became lawspeaker in 1004, succeeding his uncle Grímr when the latter's voice failed him. He held office till his death in 1030, longer than anyone else. According to the Íslendingabók he instituted judicial reform by establishing the "fifth court", a national court of appeals.

According to the Skáldatal, Skapti was a court poet of Hákon Sigurðarson but no details on that career are known. According to the Heimskringla, he composed a poem on king Óláfr Haraldsson and sent his son Steinn to perform it for the king.

The only piece of poetry by Skapti which has come down to us is decidedly Christian and can not have been composed at Hákon's court. Snorri Sturluson cites the following half-stanza by Skapti in a discussion of Christian kennings in the Skáldskaparmál.

Máttr es munka dróttins
mestr; aflar goð flestu;
Kristr skóp ríkr ok reisti
Róms hǫll verǫld alla.

— Finnur Jónsson's edition
Translation:

The King of Monks is greatest
Of might, for God all governs;
Christ's power wrought this earth all,
And raised the Hall of Rome.

— Brodeur's translation

Skapti is mentioned in some of the Icelanders' sagas, for example Njáls saga where he is insulted by Skarphéðinn Njálsson.
