= Gissur Þorvaldsson =

Medieval Icelandic chieftain

Gizurr Þorvaldsson

Jarl of Iceland
- Tenure: 1258 – 1268
- Monarchs: Haakon IV; Magnus the Lawmender
- Born: c. 1208
- Died: 12 January 1268
- Spouses: Ingibjǫrg Snorradóttir; Gróa Álfsdóttir
- Parents: Þorvaldr Gizurarson; Þóra yngri Guðmundsdóttir

Gizurr Þorvaldsson (Old Norse pronunciation: [ˈɡitˌsurː ˈθorˌwɑldsˌson]; Modern Icelandic: [ˈcɪsːʏr ˈθɔrval(t)sˌsɔn]; 1208 – 12 January 1268) was a medieval Icelandic chieftain or goði of the Haukdœlir family clan, and great-grandson of Jón Loftsson.

Gizurr played a major role in the period of civil war which is now known as Age of the Sturlungs: he fought alongside Kolbeinn the Young against the forces of Sturla Sighvatsson of the Sturlungar clan in the Battle of Ørlygsstaðir in 1238 and led the force of men who murdered saga-writer Snorri Sturluson in 1241, by the order of Haakon IV, King of Norway, who demanded Snorri's murder considering him a traitor after fleeing to Iceland following his support for Jarl Skúli's failed coup and his relatives deaths in the Battle of Ørlygsstaðir. In 1253, Gizurr's son was wedded to Sturla Þórðarson's daughter Ingibjǫrg, as a part of an attempt at ending the conflict between the Haukdœlir and Sturlungar. Shortly after the wedding, Eyjólfr ofsi, another member of the extended Sturlungar, attacked Gizurr's household at Flugumýri, in what is termed the Flugumýrarbrenna (Flugumýri Arson), a devastating attack that destroyed his paternal family line (Gissur survived the attack by hiding in a barrel of skyr.) The event was clearly traumatic for Gizurr, and caused him to campaign against the burners, and compose poetry. In 1258, he was made Earl of Iceland (Icelandic: jarl) for his loyal service to the king. He held this title until his death.

Gizurr worked actively to promote the Old Covenant (Icelandic: Gamli sáttmáli), an agreement which brought Iceland under the sovereignty of the Norwegian crown in 1264. The covenant is hence sometimes known as Gizurr's Covenant, or Gissurarsáttmáli.
