= Battle of Örlygsstaðir =

Icelandic battle, 1238

- Part of Age of the Sturlungs
| Date | 21 August 1238 (trad.) |
| Location | Örlygsstaðir, Iceland 65.501°N 19.282°W |
| Result | Ásbirningar/Haukdælir victory |

Belligerents
| Sturlungar | Ásbirningar; Haukdælir |

Commanders and leaders
| Sighvatur Sturluson †; Sturla Sighvatsson † | Kolbeinn Arnórsson; Gissur Þorvaldsson |

Strength
| ~1,000 | ~1,700 |

Casualties and losses
| Unknown | Unknown |

The Battle of Örlygsstaðir was a historic battle fought by members of the Sturlungar family against the Ásbirningar and the Haukdælir clans in northern Iceland. The battle was part of the civil war that was taking place in Iceland at the time between various powerful clans during the time known as the Age of the Sturlungs.

The Battle of Örlygsstaðir was fought on 21 August 1238 between Sighvatur Sturluson (brother of Snorri Sturluson) and his son Sturla Sighvatsson on the one hand, and Kolbeinn ungi and Gissur Þorvaldsson (later Earl Gissur) on the other. Sighvatur had nearly 500 men but there is no evidence available of the size of Sturla's following. Nonetheless, historians estimate that the Sturlungar had a total of 1000 men. Gissur and Kolbeinn had almost 1700 men in total. The areas controlled by the Sturlungar were more populous but the settlements were more scattered which made it difficult for the Sturlungar to assemble fighting men.

The Ásbirningar and Haukdælir clans emerged victorious after a short battle. About 60 men were killed on that day, including Sighvatur and Sturla. According to the Saga of the Icelanders, Gissur only lost seven men whereas Kolbeinn lost none.

Five others, including Þórir Jökull Steinfinnsson, were executed by beheading following the battle. The names of those who perished on that day are recorded in the Íslendinga saga which is included as a part of the Sturlunga saga.

In 1988, a memorial was raised on the site of the battle, which describes the battle.

== Other sources ==
- Jón Jóhannesson, Magnús Finnbogason and Kristján Eldjárn (eds.) Sturlunga Saga, Vol 1 & 2, (Sturlunguútgáfan, Reykjavík: 1946)
- Árni Daníel Júlíusson, Jón Ólafur Ísberg, Helgi Skúli Kjartansson Íslenskur sögu atlas: Volume 1, Frá öndverðu til 18. aldar (Almenna bókafélagið, Reykjavík: 1989)
