= Kristni saga =

Old Norse account of the Christianization of Iceland

Kristni saga (Old Norse pronunciation: [ˈkristne ˌsɑɣɑ]; Icelandic pronunciation: [ˈkʰrɪstnɪ ˌsaːɣa]; "the book of Christianity") is an Old Norse account of the Christianization of Iceland in the 10th century and of some later church history.

It was probably written in the early or mid-13th century, as it is dependent on the Latin biography of King Olaf Tryggvason written by the monk Gunnlaugr Leifsson around the last decade of the 12th century. This results in Latinate forms of some names. The author also used work by Ari Þorgilsson, probably the now lost longer version of the Íslendingabók, and Laxdæla saga. Based on the region of Iceland with which the text indicates the greatest familiarity, it was probably not written at Skálholt.

== Description ==
Kristni saga is described to be written in "sober, almost dry language". Its structure is odd: after recounting the conversion, it skips some fifty years ahead to the lives of bishops Ísleifr and Gizurr, and then gives an account of the feud between Þorgils and Hafliði which was likely added later, perhaps by Sturla Þórðarson. Finnur Jónsson agreed with Oskar Brenner, who wrote an early book about it, in attributing the work as a whole to Sturla; it shows a similar skill in depicting character through telling incidents, a similar use of verses and conversation, its opening sentence, "Here begins how Christianity came to Iceland", continues directly from the ending of Sturlubók, and it is preserved only in the Hauksbók manuscript, where it immediately follows Landnámabók. Siân Grønlie, who translated it, has argued that it was produced relatively late in a tradition of histories of the conversion of Iceland and intentionally emphasised the role of the Icelandic missionaries.
