= Haukdælir =

Medieval Icelandic clan

The Haukdælir (Old Norse: [ˈhɔukˌdɛːlez̠]; Modern Icelandic: [ˈhœykˌtaiːlɪr̥]) were one of the family clans who controlled medieval Iceland during the period of the Icelandic Commonwealth. Their name is derived from Haukadalur (literally, Valley of the Hawks). The Haukdælir traced their lineage to Ketilbjörn Ketilsson, who settled on land in Grímsnes and received a Goðorð in Árnesþing. Their influence was prominent during the 10th to 13th centuries, first as progressives concerning Christianity, and later as chieftains and participants in the Age of the Sturlungs civil war. In the 13th century, Gissur Þorvaldsson, leader of the Haukdælir, was made Jarl of Iceland by the King of Norway.
