= Vatnsfirðingar =

Twelfth century Icelandic clan

The Vatnsfirðings (or Vatnsfirðingar) were one of the most influential family clans in twelfth century Iceland during the period of the Icelandic Commonwealth. Their domain of influence was the town of Ísafjörður and its environs.
