= Old Covenant (Iceland) =

1262 Norwegian-Icelandic covenant

The Old Covenant (Modern Icelandic: Gamli sáttmáli [ˈkamlɪ ˈsauhtˌmauːlɪ]; Old Norse: [ˈɡɑmle ˈsɑːtːˌmɑːle]) was the name of the agreement which effected the union of Iceland and Norway. It is also known as Gissurarsáttmáli, named after Gissur Þorvaldsson, the Icelandic chieftain who worked to promote it. The name "Old Covenant", however, is probably due to historical confusion. Gamli sáttmáli is properly the treaty of 1302 mentioned below and the treaty of 1262 is the actual Gissurarsáttmáli.

The agreement also led to a shift in Iceland's political ideology towards the model of monarchy since it diminished the role of its chieftains (goði) as models of political rule. Prior to the agreement, the chieftains' power, which developed into a Commonwealth, was idealized particularly during the 12th and 13th centuries.

== Covenant ==
The agreement was made in 1262–1264 between the major chieftains of Iceland and Haakon IV of Norway, and his son and successor, Magnus the Lawgiver. The signing brought about the union of Iceland with Norway, which subsequently led to Iceland's union with Denmark in 1380, by way of the Kalmar Union.

The years preceding the signing of the accord were marked by civil strife in Iceland (the so-called Age of the Sturlungs), as the Norwegian king tried to exert his influence through the Icelandic family clans, most notably the Sturlungs. Gissur Þorvaldsson, a vassal of the king, worked as his agent in the matter.

According to the provisions in the agreement, the Icelanders were to bear taxation from the Norwegian king, but in exchange they were to receive a code of laws, guaranteed peace and reliable transportation and shipping between Norway and Iceland. Norwegians and Icelanders received equal rights in each other's countries. The laws of the Icelandic Commonwealth were updated and a book of laws named Jónsbók was issued in 1281. Under the Norwegian rule, trade links between the two countries increased and Iceland's settlement expanded.

The agreement was renewed in 1302 at the behest of Haakon V of Norway. Iceland's union with Norway (and, after the Treaty of Kiel, with Denmark) lasted until 1944, during World War II, when the Republic of Iceland was founded.

Several possible explanations have been offered for the succumbing of Icelandic chieftains to the Norwegian Crown:

- They were tired of war and believed that a covenant with the King would lead to lasting peace.
- A fear that the King would embargo Iceland unless they swore allegiance to him.
- The support of the Church for the King's cause to annex Iceland.
- Icelandic chieftains making deals with the King to annex Iceland in exchange for serving as his courtiers.
- Icelandic chieftains surrendering their chieftaincies in the hopes that they would soon rule them as fiefs.
- The Icelanders were not aware of ideas of sovereignty and did not adhere to modern types of nationalism.
- Royal power was a much stronger political force than the Icelandic Commonwealth.

The use of the sagas as accurate historical sources has been questioned by historian Patricia Pires Boulhosa who claims Gamli sáttmáli is a much younger document and was used to negotiate with the Norwegian king for the benefit of Icelanders. Some historians, therefore, questioned the authenticity of the Old Covenant itself, citing that it could be an imaginative reconstruction. The earliest copies of the Old Covenant are from the 15th century.

== Bibliography ==
- Árni Daníel Júlíusson, Jón Ólafur Ísberg, Helgi Skúli Kjartansson Íslenskur sögu atlas: 1. bindi: Frá öndverðu til 18. aldar Almenna bókafélagið, Reykjavík 1989
- Boulhosa, Patricia Pires (2005), Icelanders and the Kings of Norway: Medieval Sagas and Legal Texts, The Northern World, Brill Academic.
