= History of Icelandic nationality =

Iceland is an island country between the North Atlantic and Arctic Oceans, on the Mid-Atlantic Ridge between North America and Europe. Icelandic nationality is concerned with the conditions by which an individual is a national of Iceland.

== Icelandic constitution ==
In 930 AD, the constitution of Iceland was instituted which made Iceland a self-governing country with a people's assembly called the Althing (alþingi). The Althing represented the people and met once a year to make laws and judge important cases. Matters of lesser importance were dealt with by local spring assemblies, regulated by local chiefs. The Althing was an important part of Icelandic culture and would be integral in their struggle to become an independent nation.

== Iceland under Norway and Denmark ==
In 1262 Iceland swore allegiance to the king of Norway, and in 1380 was under the rule of the newly united kingdom of Norway and Denmark. Nevertheless, the Althing continued to control the national politics of Iceland due to the indifference of the monarch to its remote population. In 1660, Denmark became an absolutist state and the power of the Althing was diminished significantly. It now held mainly judicial functions, without any legislative power, but was finally abolished in 1800.

== Nationalist movements in Iceland ==
The nationalist movement in Iceland sprang from the romantic literary ideas of the Enlightenment such that nationalistic ideas were originally expressed in the literature of the period and were only later to be involved in the political events of the country.

The abolition of the Althing was a shock to the identity of Iceland. It had not only served as a legislative and judicial body but also had brought the Icelandic communities together annually which served as a unifying force in society. It had become an important part of Icelandic culture and tradition. In 1843, the Althing was successfully re-established as an advisory board to the Danish government, which was a great victory for Icelandic nationalism after what the Althing had come to symbolize for the community.

In 1851, the Althing proposed a separate constitution for Iceland, which resulted in the attempt of the Danish representatives to end the meeting, to the protest of the Icelanders. This was Iceland's first national conflict with Denmark in the political domain.

By 1871, Iceland was still part of the Danish kingdom; however, by this point in time nationalists had managed to pass a law allowing Iceland to trade with all nations (1854) and had liberalized its election laws (1857). Iceland as such had control over much of its own affairs, although still under Danish rule.

A demand for their own constitution, giving legislative power to the Althing was granted in 1874, giving Iceland control of all internal affairs and in 1903 an Icelandic cabinet minister replaced the Danish governors. By 1918 Iceland became a sovereign state in union with Denmark, and in 1944 Iceland was declared a sovereign republic.

Importance was placed on the idea that the new nation must be based on Icelandic ideas, and not imported ones from Europe. The traditions of the Icelandic people were to be used to guide the new republic, which hoped to develop independently from Europe, with emphasis on its distinctive culture and history.

== Nationality laws ==
Ancestry is considered by Icelandic nationality law to be the important factor in attaining citizenship, rather than place of birth. Therefore, one is not an Icelandic citizen just by being born in Iceland, but must be born of Icelandic parents.

== Emigration ==
In the late 19th century Iceland was faced with a series of natural disasters that forced one fifth of the population to emigrate to North America by 1914. The volcanic eruption of Askja left the North East of Iceland covered in ash, where the largest number of people were forced to leave the country. Poor harvests, due to harsh winters and cold summers, throughout the country also forced large populations to leave Iceland. Those descendants born outside Iceland, or who acquired citizenship from the country they emigrated to would lose their Icelandic citizenship. Before 2003 dual citizenship was not permitted, therefore naturalizing in a foreign country would mean losing your Icelandic citizenship. Those people who lost their citizenship in this manner, however, were given the chance to reclaim Icelandic citizenship after 2003, but only until July 1, 2007. At present those born outside Iceland will lose their Icelandic citizenship by age twenty two if they do not live in Iceland before this time or do not apply to retain their citizenship. They do not need to give up their citizenship in their country of residence.

== Rights ==
=== Education ===
Public education is funded by the Icelandic government and is compulsory for students 15 years and younger. Education is free for all citizens from the primary to the university level providing all citizens with the right to education. Children of refugees can be enrolled in public school after residing in the country for three months, providing education as a right not only for all citizens but also for all children in the country.

=== Health care ===
Prenatal and infant medical care is provided without cost to all citizens, while health care for children is highly subsidized. Refugees also have access to the health care services provided by the state. Law provides the right of access to health care for all people who have been residing in the country for six months, regardless of nationality. Hospitalisation is free of charge, as well as long-term care of the sick or elderly. Medication and treatment outside hospitals requires the payment of specific fees, which are regulated by law.

== Women's rights ==
In Iceland, women hold equal rights as men under judicial and family law. Men, however, are still paid more than women working in the same field. The Icelandic government helps to finance a variety of organizations and facilities to help women that are victims of violence. This aid is not restricted to citizens alone, but is open to all women, including immigrants who suffer from abuse. With regards to political representation, in 2005, there were 23 women sitting in parliament out of 63 seats, and 4 women in the cabinet, which has 12 members. 2 out of the 9 Supreme Court members were women so that in government office, women hold roughly one third of the seats.

== Freedom of speech and religion ==
Freedom of speech is provided for by law, but public slander based on religion, race, nationality, sexual orientation or skin color is illegal and punishable by fines and imprisonment. Citizens, therefore, are provided the right to free speech, as long as it does not endanger or demean other people. The right to peaceful assembly and associations are also protected by the constitution, as well as freedom of religion. However, Lutheranism, the state religion, is provided with more funding than other religions and more priority in school curricula.

== Taxation ==
The main obligation to the state in Iceland is paying taxes. Anyone who lives in Iceland for six months or longer is considered a resident and is, therefore, subject to the states income taxes, as well as municipal taxes. This applies for both citizens and non-citizens. All permanent residents over the age of sixteen are considered taxpayers and are provided a tax card, which is used to calculate their contributions. If someone is planning on leaving the country, they must submit their tax return one month before their departure.

== Icelandic resistance to American involvement ==
In 1946, Iceland joined the UN and as such became more involved in international affairs. Due to its strategic location for Trans-Atlantic flights, the United States took an interest in establishing an airbase in Keflavík, for the needs of post war occupation of Germany. Keflavík was located only 50 kilometers from the capital, Reykjavík, and as such there was fear that Icelandic culture would be compromised by this base. The attempts to establish a 99-year control of this base by the Americans were met with great political outcry, as many saw this base as selling Iceland and its independence.

In 1954, the American Defense Force were given permission to operate the first television station in Iceland. This station was intended for use by the American base only, but by 1959, there were already concerns since Icelandic citizens were able to receive the television signals. By 1964 the resistance to this station increased as many intellectuals feared that exposure to American television would be destructive to Icelandic language and culture as children became more influenced by American media. Politically it was seen as opposition to Icelandic sovereignty to allow a foreign country to operate an influential television station in Iceland, especially since it was in a foreign language. The American television station, as well as radio station, were therefore confined to the base and Icelandic radio stations and television stations became more numerous.

In 1956, a curfew was placed on the American servicemen requiring them to be in their base by ten o'clock, as a way to prevent their presence in the capital. American presence was seen as a threat to Icelandic culture and independence.

== Culture ==
Icelandic culture plays an important part in the national identity of the country and as such there have been several attempts to preserve it. One of the most important parts of this traditional culture are its sagas, which were passed down from the early Viking settlement of the island, and hold a strong significance towards national identity. In 1946, Halldor Laxness's novel Atom Station, the theme was of American presence damaging the culture in the south as compared to the pure saga culture of the north, as well as the use of Iceland as a base for an atomic war.

The Althing was also viewed as a part of Icelandic culture due to its long tradition in Iceland and its use as a unifying force for the citizens of the country, as well as its status as the oldest parliament in the world.

Another aspect of culture held dear by many Icelanders is their history of non-violence and neutrality. The idea of Iceland as an unarmed nation with no military force became a tradition which shaped the idea the population held about itself. It was this pacifism which stopped Iceland from joining the United Nations in 1944, and although it made contributions to the Allies, it would not declare war. When it did join the UN in 1946, the terms were that there would be no military bases in the country. The importance placed on pacifism was a significant part of Icelandic national identity. When Iceland decided to join NATO in 1949, it resulted in a riot outside the Althing as this decision broke the historical tradition of neutrality that was viewed as important to Icelandic heritage.

Language was also an important factor in Icelandic nationality, where an emphasis was placed on making laws in their native language. A common language served as a unifying factor for Icelanders, as well as a way to distinguish themselves from the Danish and the laws of Denmark. The modern Icelandic language is very similar to that of the Middle Ages, not having changed drastically, making it a source of historical continuity and part of an ongoing perception of the nation. There has also been an attempt since the seventeenth century to keep the language free from influence of foreign words, which continued as a means to reassert independence. Foreign words were associated with foreign domination, creating a need to preserve the Icelandic language in while under Danish rule. New vocabulary brought in by the Danish or through Christianity, therefore, were originally met with distrust, and seen as a threat to their autonomy. A national flag was also essential to the image of Iceland as an independent nation, asserting its distinctiveness from Denmark.

== Nordic Council ==
In 1952 Iceland became part of the Nordic Council, an organization between Iceland, Norway, Finland, Denmark and Sweden which consists of a governing body and five national secretariats, that meet annually and is attended by parliament members of the five countries. The council does not have any formal authority, but instead serves as an advisory council to the various governments.

In 1975, Sweden gave the right to vote in local elections to foreigners from countries within the Nordic Council. Denmark allowed the same right in 1977, followed by Norway in 1978 and Finland in 1981. In 1986, Iceland also granted members of the Nordic Council the right to vote in local elections but only after 3 years of residence in the country. Therefore, Icelandic citizens were given the right to vote in local elections in all other countries who were part of the Nordic Council by 1981, providing its citizens with some political rights if they emigrated to these countries, even if they had not become citizens. Also after, three years, non-citizens in Iceland could vote if they came from a Nordic Country.

== Membership of the European Union ==
Since May 2006, Iceland has opened its borders to workers that are part of the European Union, who are now able to enter Iceland without the need of a work permit. These workers are permitted to stay in Iceland for six months while looking for a job but once a job is found, the employer must inform the Directorate of Labour of the employment of a foreigner. Because of this policy, the population of foreigners in Iceland has risen from 1.4% in 1985 to almost 7% in 2006.

These workers are paid the same as the Icelandic population in jobs with fixed rates, but in jobs such as trades, they are commonly paid less. These foreigners are mostly males looking for employment, and 64% of the recent immigrants work in construction.

Preference is given to EU members over non-Europeans and therefore it is more difficult for non-Europeans to find work in Iceland as employers must prove that the job was advertised in the EU before a work permit can be given to a non-European. This causes a problems for non-Europeans already residing in Iceland, who are faced with more difficulty when attempting to bring family into the country. Non-Europeans must find jobs for their family members before they would be allowed to enter the country, and since preference is given to members of the European Union, finding jobs becomes more problematic.

== Passports and visas ==
Nordic Country members do not require any form of travel document or work permit to enter the country and are also provided the right to remain in Iceland for more than six months by providing a Nordic change of residence certificate.

Citizens of countries from the EU also do not require a visa and are able to stay in Iceland for six months while looking for work. They must prove, however, that they have the means to support themselves while looking for work in the country or while studying.

Members of countries outside the EU and Nordic Countries, however, require a passport to enter the country, and if they intend to find employment they also require a visa. When applying for residence the person must provide proof that they have health insurance and have the means to support themselves, as well as proof of a place of residence for their stay in Iceland. They must also provide their criminal record, proving they are not a criminal, before they will be permitted in the country. It is, therefore, more difficult for members outside the EU and the Nordic countries to gain entrance into Iceland.

== Notes ==
=== References ===
- Bureau of Democracy, Human Rights, and Labor (2006). "Iceland: Country Reports on Human Rights Practices-2006". U.S. Department of State.
- Corgan, Michael T. (2002). Iceland and its Alliances: Security for a Small State. Lewinton, NY: The Edwin Mellen Press.
- Grondal, Benedikt (1971). Iceland: from Neutrality to NATO Membership. Oslo, Norway: Universitetsforlaget.
- Hastrup, Kirsten (1998). A Place Apart: an Anthropological Study of the Icelandic World. Oxford: Clarendon Press.
- Ørvik, Nils (1974). "Nordic cooperation and high politics". International Organization. 28 (1): 61–88. doi:10.1017/s0020818300004367. JSTOR 2706120. S2CID 155064913.
- Thorhallson, Baldur, ed. (2004). Iceland and European Integration: On the Edge. London: Routledge. ISBN 9780415282529.
