= Hielmstierne (noble family) =

- Nobility
- Country: Denmark; Norway
- Origin: Denmark
- Founded: 3 February 1747
- Founder: Henrich Hielmstierne
- Members: Andrea Kirstine Hielmstierne; Agnete Marie Hielmstierne
- Connected members: Marcus Gerhard Rosencrone

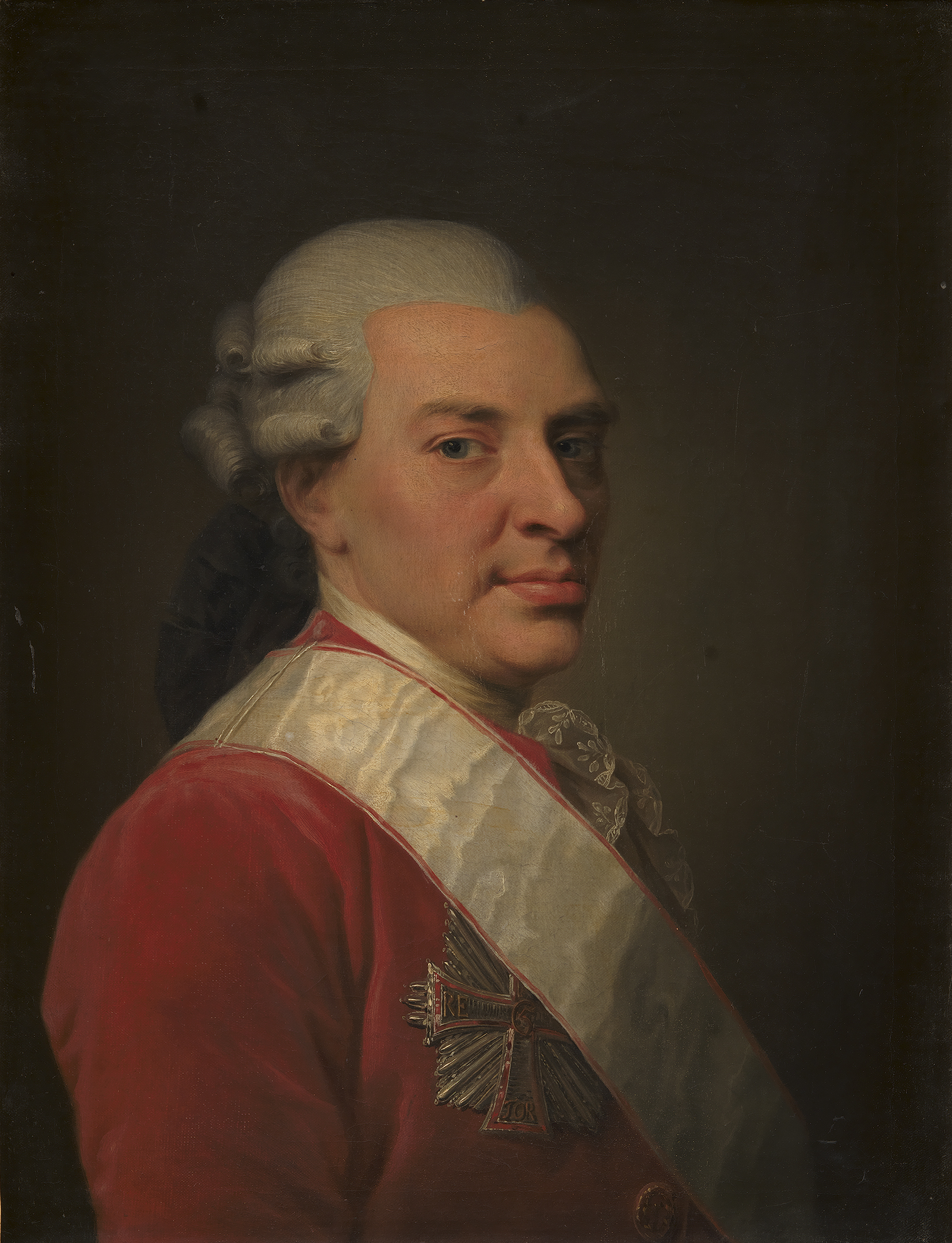
Henrich Hielmstierne

The Hielmstierne family (English: lit. Helm Star) was a Dano-Norwegian noble family.

== History ==
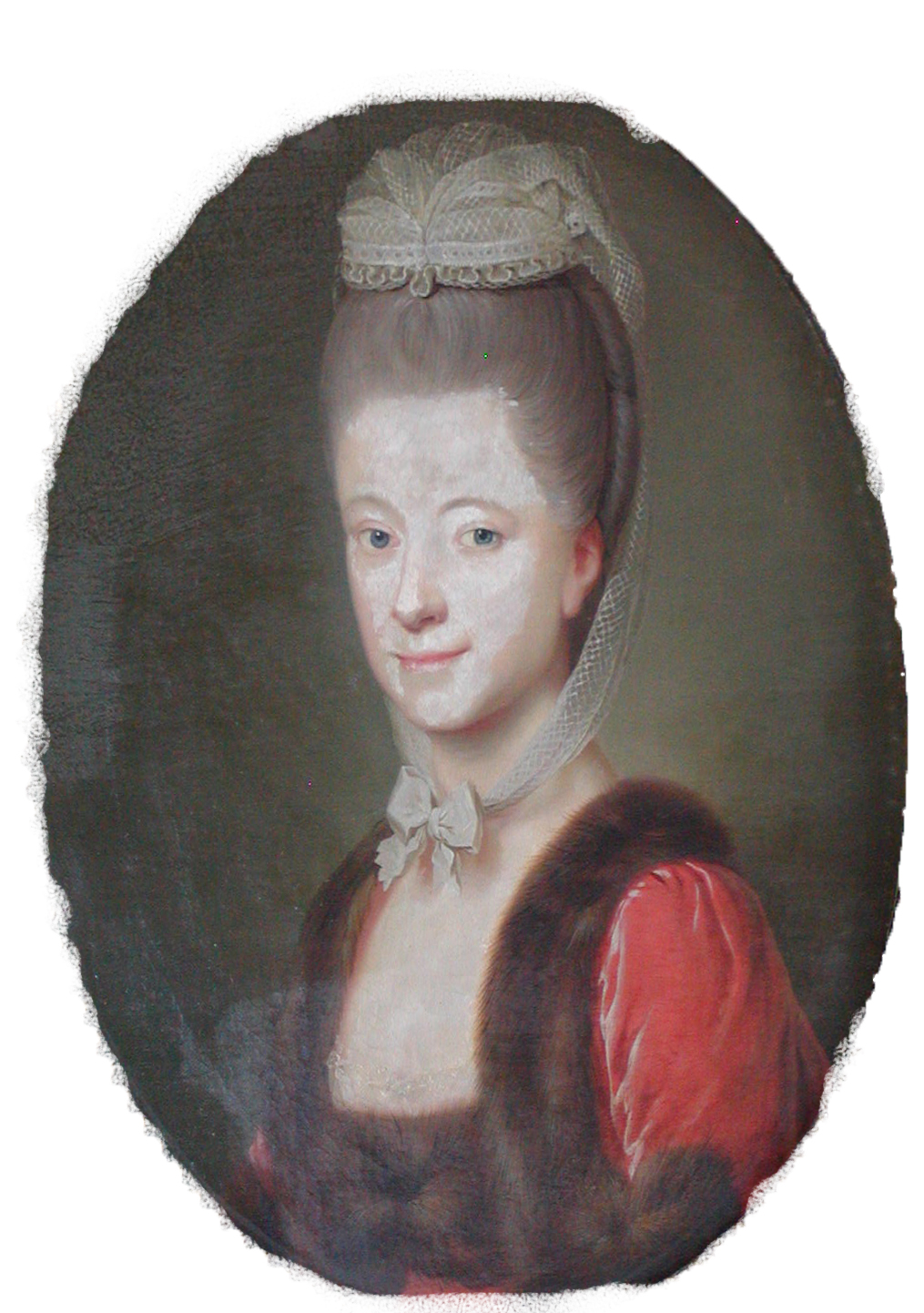
Agnete Marie, Countess of Rosencrone, née Hielmstierne

Henrich Henrichsen (1 January 1715 – 18 July 1780) was a Danish official, historian, and collector of books. He was born in Copenhagen to Niels Henrichsen, a wealthy Icelandic merchant, and Agnete Birgitte, née Finkenhagen.

On 3 February 1747 he was ennobled under the name Hielmstierne, and on 4 August in the same year he married noblewoman Andrea Kirstine Kiærulf (19 January 1730 – 19 October 1806).

Their only daughter, Agnete Marie Hielmstierne (b. 21 July 1752), married Marcus Gerhard Rosencrone, who later was created Count of Rosencrone. They had no children.

== Coat of arms ==
Description: On a silver shield a vertical border within which there are three six-pointed golden stars. On the helm a noble coronet, from which arise two silver bird wings between which there is a six-pointed golden star. Supporters: two onto the shield looking crowned silver eagles.

== See also ==
- Danish nobility
- Norwegian nobility

== Literature ==
- Jürgen Beyer, ‘Henrik Hielmstierne,’ in: Sankt Petri Kopenhagen 1575-2000. 425 Jahre Geschichte deutsch-dänischer Begegnung in Biographien, ed. Jürgen Beyer & Johannes Jensen (Copenhagen: C. A. Reitzel, 2000), pp. 45-49
- A. Thiset og P.L. Wittrup: Nyt dansk Adelslexikon, Copenhagen 1904
- Sven Tito Achen: Danske adelsvåbener, Copenhagen 1973
- Eiler Nystrøm, Den grevelige Hielmstierne Rosencroneske Stiftelse. Et historisk Tilbageblik (Copenhagen: Gyldendal - Nordisk Forlag, 1925)
- Danish Biographical Encyclopædia: Hielmstierne, Henrik
