= Óláfs saga Tryggvasonar (disambiguation) =

Óláfs saga Tryggvasonar is the name of several closely related works on the life of the king Olaf Tryggvason - these include :

- A lost version in Latin by Oddr Snorrason
- A lost version in Latin by Gunnlaugr Leifsson
- Óláfs saga Tryggvasonar in Heimskringla
- A version in the Fagrskinna
- Óláfs saga Tryggvasonar en mesta also known as Mesta or the Greatest Saga of Óláfr Tryggvason
  - Óláfs saga Tryggvasonar in Flateyjarbók (a version of Mesta)
