= Þorgils saga ok Hafliða =

Þorgils saga ok Hafliða (the saga of Þorgils and Hafliði) is a medieval Icelandic samtíðarsaga forming part of the larger, thirteenth-century Sturlunga saga. Þorgils saga ok Hafliða tells of the chieftains Hafliði Másson and Þorgils Oddason and about the dispute between them in the years 1117–21. The saga was probably composed in the early thirteenth century, but possibly as early as 1180 or as late as 1237 (after the death of Bishop Magnús Gissurarson).

== Content ==
The conflict arises as a result of misdeeds of Már, a relative of Hafliði, and it leads several killings, and with Þorgils being declared an outlaw by the Thing. The two parties are eventually reconciled, at the initiative of Bishop Ketill. The saga gives the impression of being an exemplum for how conflicts can be resolved peacefully. The saga is also known for the tenth chapter's depiction of Yngvildr Þorðardóttir's wedding at Reykjahólar in 1119: the passage is characterised by portrayals of the use of poetry and of oral storytelling as forms of entertainment, making it central to the literary-historical discussion of the oral saga tradition in Iceland. Amongst other entertainments, the saga mentions that the farmer Hrólfr of Skálmarnes

sagði sögu frá Hröngviði víkíngi ok frá Óláfi Liðsmannakonungi ok haugbroti Þráins berserks ok Hrómundi Gripssyni—ok margar vísur með. En þessari sögu var skemmt Sverri konungi, ok kallaði hann slíkar lygisögur skemmtiligstar. Ok þó kunna menn at telja ættir sínar til Hrómundar Gripssonar. Þessa sögu hafði Hrólfr sjálfr saman setta.

told a saga about Hröngviðr the Viking and about Óláfr King of Warriors, and breaking into Þráinn the Berserk's burial mound, and Hrómundr Gripsson—and many verses along with it. King Sverrir found this saga amusing, and he called such "lying sagas" the most entertaining. And yet men are able to reckon their ancestry from Hrómundr Gripsson. Hrólfr had composed this saga himself.

== Manuscripts ==
The text is mostly preserved in post-medieval paper copies of Sturlunga saga, but the last part is found in an earlier parchment manuscript, AM 122A.

== Editions and translations ==
The saga is found in editions and translations of Sturlunga saga. Stand-alone handlings of the saga include the following.

- Þorgils saga ok Hafliða, ed. by Ursula Brown (London: Oxford University Press, 1952).
- Soga om Torgils og Havlide. Trans. by Jan Ragnar Hagland. Samlaget, 1979. (Norrøne bokverk ; 47). ISBN 82-521-0924-1. Reprinted in 1984 in Sagalitteraturen vol. 3. ISBN 82-521-2423-2.
