= Setesvein =

Setesvein or setesvenn is the name of medieval and pre-reformatory armed pages who acted as local representatives of a bishop or of a feudal lord in Norway. Setesveins between 1350 and 1537 are commonly associated with the Catholic Archbishop, on whose behalf they exercised administrative and military functions in their respective districts. Clerical setesveins were especially numerous in Northern Norway, where they constitute an important part of the regional upper-class history.

== Etymology and definition ==
The word setesvein consists of sete, meaning 'seat, residence', and svein, meaning 'young servant' or 'page'. It descends from Old Norwegian setusveinn. Under Danish influence, the word was spelled sædesvend, from which the modern, but today less used form setesvenn derives. Whilst svein is considered as Norwegian Nynorsk and svenn is mainly used in Norwegian Bokmål (including Riksmål), the form setesvein is predominant in both languages.

In general, a svein or a huskarl (housecarl) was a page residing at a court, whilst a setesvein was attached to a court, but had his own residence; thus the word sete. Johan Fritzner's dictionary of Old Norwegian defines a setusveinn as a housecarl who is in the service of a lendman or of a bishop without living at his master's residence or court.

Among other places, setesveins are mentioned in several Diplomatarium Norvegicum documents and in the Codex of the Hird. Examples are:

- RB 7119: þeir sem Noregs konungar hafa áðr leitt í sínum lögum nökkura setusveina at hafa
- DN III, 477 (35812): engin várra skal fleiri húskarla ok setusveina hafa en sem lögbók ok hirðskrá vátta
- DN VIII, 592 (58323)
- DN IX, 69413: alle the knaber therinde och sædescwenne

== History ==
=== Until 1350 ===
A svein was originally an armed page who was in the service of and resided at the court of a chieftain. Subsequently, they separated into a secular and a clerical section. In the High Medieval Age (1130–1350) and in the Late Medieval Age (1350–1537), a page was normally one who had entered the court of a bishop or of a feudal lord. It was customary that young men of lower nobility and of local and wealthy families served at the court of the Archbishop (as a svein) until returning to his district, where he acted as his lord's representative (as a setesvein).

In Celestine III's papal bull of 15 June 1194, secular officers of the Archbishop received freedom from all taxes and military duties. According to the Sættargjerd of 1277 (a concordat between the Church and the King), which was approved by Pope Gregory X, the Archbishop had the right to have 100 setesveins, and this without paying taxes. Likewise, each bishop could have 40 setesveins.

In the years of the Black Death (c. 1348–1353), setesveins in the service of secular noblemen (knights) were placed under the direct control of the King. This represented the end of group of secular setesveins.

=== 1350–1537 ===
In the Late Middle Ages, clerical setesveins were seated mainly along the coast, from Sogn in Western Norway to Finnmark in Northern Norway. Their function was to administer the Archbishop's estate, for example by collecting taxes. In addition, they traded, partly themselves and partly on behalf of the Archbishop. In the 1530s, there were at least 69 setesveins in Norway, whereof 49 in Northern Norway. The reason for their numerous presence in this region were the important fisheries and the thereto belonging export to Continental Europe.

Whilst they were not noble ex officio, setesveins had, in general, the same social and economical position as lower nobility. It is known that a few setesveins received 'noble freedom' from the Archbishop. Clerical setesveins were recruited mainly among lower nobility and very wealthy farmers.

Alike the nobility, setesveins enjoyed full tax freedom for their seat farms. They had freedom from leidang (military service); however, the Archbishop could order them into military service for the Archdiocese.

After the Reformation in 1537, when the Archbishop went into exile and the Catholic Church of Norway was dissolved and replaced by the Church of Norway, setesveins lost the legal foundation on which their positions rested. Furthermore, King Christian III did send soldiers to raid the coast, punishing and confiscating goods of setesveins who had supported the Archbishop.

=== After 1537 ===
In the following years, most setesveins continued being traders and shippers. Some of them apparently remained local representatives of the Church, now under the new, Lutheran Superintendent and the canons in Nidaros. Members of this class of ex-setesveins were known as pages (Norwegian: knape, knabe; lit. 'boy') and are today known under the non-official term page nobility (Norwegian: knapeadel, knabeadel). They were part of the upper social class in Northern Norway in the 16th and 17th centuries, and several Nordland families descend from them. Their social significance and their impact on culture have been considerable in the region.

== Information and statistics ==
In a list of 1533, named Sancte Oluffz domkirkis Szeteswenne (Setesveins of the Cathedral of St. Olaf), one finds that Olav Engelbrektsson, Archbishop of Nidaros had 69 setesveins. Ending with 'etc.', the list is apparently incomplete.

=== 1533 list: Statistics ===
Region	District	Number	Ref.
Northern Norway	Finnmark	18	
	Troms and Senja	16	
	Vesterålen and Lofoten	5	
	Salten and Helgeland	10	
Central Norway	Fosen	3	
	Gauldalen	1	
Western Norway	Nordmøre	2	
	Romsdal	1	
	Nordfjord	1	
	Sogn	1	
Eastern Norway	Gudbrandsdalen	1	
	Opplanda	9	
Overseas	Iceland	2	

=== 1533 list: Names and places ===
The following list is based mainly on Ludvig Ludvigsen Daae's presentation of the 1533 list of setesveins. The presentation is a part of an article named Den Throndhjemske Erkestols Sædesvende og Frimænd (1890). Daae's presentation contains additional comments and references. These are not included in the list below.

Name (original orthography)	Name (modern or alternative orthography)	Place (original orthography)	Place (modern orthography)	Comments	Ref.
Mogns Laffrinsen	Mons Lavransson	Wordøyn	Vardøya		
Halword Søgnn	Hallvard —	Wordøyn	Vardøya	The list contains further information.	
Henrick Ysackson	Henrik Isaksson	Wordøyn	Vardøya		
Oluff Keelsson	Olav Kjellsson	Matkowr	Makkaur		
Erlend Skott	Erlend Skotte	Umgong	Omgang	'Skott' means 'man from Scotland'.	
Peder Iffversson	Per Ivarsson	Umgong	Omgang	His name is struck out in the list.	
Jon Goutisonn	Jon Gauteson	Skitningsberg	Skjøtningsberg		
Oluf Alffzon	Olav Alvsson	Skitningsberg	Skjøtningsberg	The list contains further information.	
Reider Andersonn	Reidar Andersson	Kelwiken	Kjelvika		
Lasse Jute	Lasse Jyde	Tuffuenes	Tunes	'Jute' means 'man from Jutland'.	
Laffrens Bentsson	Lavrans Bentsson	Tuffuenes	Tunes	His name is struck out in the list.	
Welick		Tuffuenes	Tunes	His name is struck out in the list.	
Saxe		Helmisøynn	Hjelmsøya		
Mogns Olufson	Mons Olavsson	Ingen	Ingøya		
Stein Halvordson	Stein Hallvarsson	Ingen	Ingøya		
Andor Siurdson	Andor Sjursson	Søderwer	Sørvær		
Peder Booson		Søderwer	Sørvær		
Jacop	Jakop	Søderwer	Sørvær		
Peder Hemmingson	Per Hemmingsson	Trumsen	Troms	The list contains further information.	
Matz Scriffuer	Mats Skriver	Trumsen	Troms	'Scriffwer', with other spellings, is a family name and a profession meaning 'writer'. The list contains further information.	
Torstein Engelbretson	Torstein Engelbrektsson	Trumsen	Troms	A brother of Archbishop Olav Engelbrektsson.	
Jon Skarffw	Jon Skarv	Trumsen	Troms	His name is struck out in the list.	
Ammund	Amund	Trumsen	Troms		
Oluf Ericsonn	Olav Eiriksson	Trumsen	Troms	Apparently added to the list later. The list contains further information.	
Aslak Engelbrictson	Aslak Engelbrektsson	Trondenes	Trondenes	The list contains further information. A brother of Archbishop Olav Engelbrektsson.	
Oluf Tordson	Olav Tordsson	Trondenes	Trondenes		
Oluf Engelbrictson	Olav Engelbrektsson	Trondenes, Roglen	Trondenes, Rogla		
Oluf Amundson	Olav Amundsson	Trondenes	Trondenes		
Nils Seborg		Trondenes	Trondenes	His name is struck out in the list.	
Oluf Halvordson	Olav Hallvardsson	Trondenes	Trondenes	His name is struck out in the list.	
Lasse Jenson	Lasse Jensson	Trondenes	Trondenes	The list contains further information.	
Oluf Halvordson	Olav Hallvardsson	Torsken	Torsken		
Nils Seborgh		—	—		
Jens Jwte	Jens Jute	—	—	'Jwte' means 'man from Jutland'.	
Oluf Person	Olav Persson	Andenes	Andenes		
Rasmus Scriffwer	Rasmus Skriver	Westeraalen	Vesterålen	'Scriffwer', with other spellings, is a family name and a profession meaning 'writer'.	
Sylvester	Sylvester	Lofothen	Lofoten	The list contains further information.	
Jens Nilsson	Jens Nilsson	Røster	Røst		
Iver Jonson	Ivar Jonsson	Løddingen	Lødingen		
Jon Haagenson	Jon Håkonsson	Salten	Salten		
Nils Degen	Nils Degn	Salten	Salten	'Degen' means 'deacon'.	
Knudt Torleffzon	Knut Torleivsson	Salten	Salten		
Jens Jwte	Jens Jute	Salten	Salten	'Jwte' means 'man from Jutland'. The list contains further information.	
Steffan Anderson	Steffan Andersson	Gildeskaalen	Gildeskål	The list contains further information.	
Michil Teyste	Mikkel Teiste	Rødøyn	Rødøya	Teiste was a noble family.	
Peder Gouteson	Per Gauteson	Rødøyn	Rødøya	The list contains further information.	
Stig	Stig	Rødøyn, Nesøyn	Rødøy, Nesøya	The list contains further information.	
Olwff Kuse	Olav Kusse	Alstehough	Alstahaug	Kusse was a noble family. The list contains further information.	
Nils Smydht	Nils Smidt	Alstehough	Altstahaug	'Smidt', with other spellings, is a family name meaning 'smith'.	
Anders Amundson	Anders Amundsson	Fosen	Fosen		
Jacob Syndmør		Fosen	Fosen	The list contains further information.	
Haftor Keelson	Havtor Kjellsson	Fosen	Fosen	The list contains further information.	
Nils	Nils	Qvernes, Ykersøyn	Kvernes, Ekkilsøy	The list contains further information.	
Nils Benctson	Nils Bentsson	Qvernes	Kvernes		
Elef	Eiliv	Søndmør, Sunnes	Sunnmøre, ...	The list contains further information.	
Esbjørn Erichsen	Asbjørn Eiriksson	Romsdalen	Romsdalen	The list contains further information.	
Jens Klokkegyther		Nordfjord	Nordfjord		
Gunnar Ragnesson	Gunnar Ragneson	Sogn	Sogn		
Erik	Eirik	Gouldalen, Vinsnes	Gauldalen, Vinsnes	The list contains further information.	
Erre		Doffre	Dovre		
Østen Kloot	Øystein —	—	—		
Oluf Siurdsøn	Olav Sjursson	Haghe	?		
Oluff	Olav	—	—		
Henning Munk	Henning Munk	Lwm	Lom	The list contains further information.	
Tord Vidersonn	Tord Vidarsson	—	—	His name is struck out in the list. The list contains further information.	
Endrit Jensson	Eindride Jensson	—	—	The list says 'Endrit Jensson Anno MDXXXV'.	
Søffwerin	Søren	Gyle	?	The list contains further information.	
Oluff Lagmand	Olav lagmann (Norwegian); Ólafur lögmaður (Icelandic)	Ysland	Island	A 'lagmand' was a lawspeaker.	
Jørgen Halsteinsson	Jørgen Halsteinsson	—	—		

== Literature ==
- Benedictow, O. J. & Mykland, Knut (1977). Norges historie 5 : Fra rike til provins 1448–1536. Cappelen. ISBN 978-82-02-03429-0.
- Daae, Ludvig Ludvigsen: Den Throndhjemske Erkestols Sædesvende og Frimænd, pp. 1–27 in the Historisk Tidsskrift, vol, III, series 1. Kristiania, 1890.
- Hamre, Lars: Setesvein, pp. 161–164 in Kulturhistorisk leksikon for nordisk middelalder, vol. 15. Copenhagen, 1970.
- Sigurðsson, Jón Viðar (1999). Norsk historie 800–2000 : Norsk historie 1300–1625 : eit rike tek form. ISBN 978-82-521-5545-7.
- Ytreberg, Nils Andreas (1980). Nordlandske handelssteder : virke, hverdag, reiseliv, fest. F. Bruns bokhandels forlag. ISBN 978-82-7028-460-3.
