= Sighvatr Sturluson =

Icelandic skald (c. 1170 – 1238)

Sighvatr Sturluson (Old Norse pronunciation: [ˈsiɣˌxwɑtz̠ ˈsturloˌson]; given name also Sigvatr, IPA: [ˈsiɣˌwɑtz̠]; Icelandic: Sighvatur Sturluson, IPA: [ˈsɪɣˌkʰvaːtʏr ˈstʏ(r)tlʏˌsɔːn]; c. 1170 – 1238) was a skaldic poet, goði and member of the Icelandic Sturlungar clan. His parents were Sturla Þórðarson of Hvammur and Guðný Böðvarsdóttir. His younger brother, the famous poet and historian Snorri Sturluson, grew up away from home, in Oddi, while Sighvatr and his elder brother Þórð(u)r were brought up in Hvammur. Nothing is known about his education. He married Kolbeinn Tumason’s sister Halldóra Tumadóttir, with whom he had a son, Sturla Sighvatsson.

He figures in the Sturlunga saga, one of the sources which cites his poetry. Only two stanzas of Sighvatr's work now remain: the first refers to the killing of Hallr Kleppjárnsson by Kálfr Guttormsson in 1212, the other to a dream before his death in the Battle of Örlygsstaðir in 1238.

According to philologist Roberta Frank, a half-stanza by Sighvatr was misinterpreted, and thus becoming the belief in the Blood eagle ritual.

== Sources ==
- Guðrún Nordal, Tools of Literacy. The Role of Skaldic Verse in Icelandic Textual Culture of the Twelfth and Thirteenth Centuries. Toronto: University of Toronto Press, 2001. pp. 186–7.
- Frank, Roberta (1984). "Viking atrocity and Skaldic verse: The Rite of the Blood-Eagle". English Historical Review. Oxford Journals. XCIX (CCCXCI): 332–343. doi:10.1093/ehr/XCIX.CCCXCI.332.
