= Skáldatal =

Prose work in Old Norse

Skáldatal (Catalogue of Poets) is a short prose work by Snorri Sturluson in Old Norse. It was preserved in two manuscripts: DG 11, or Codex Upsaliensis, which is one of the four main manuscripts of the Prose Edda (first quarter of the 14th century), and Kringla, the main manuscript of the Heimskringla from around 1260, which was lost in the fire of Copenhagen in 1728. Several copies of it exist. Skáldatal lists court poets of Norwegian rulers from legendary times until the assassination of Snorri in 1241. The two copies add rulers until 1260 and 1300. Rulers in Denmark and Sweden that are mentioned Heimskringla are generally also in Skáldatal. The archetype of Skáldatal by Snorri Sturluson can be restored with some confidence as shown by Þorgeir Sigurðsson. He showed that the Kringla version has added poets from Heimskringla that are not in DG 11 and that DG 11 seems to have edited inconvenient information related to Snorri.

Steinvör Sighvatsdóttir is one of three women listed as a poet in Skáldatal. Another is Vilborg under King Olaf III of Norway (d. 1069), the third is Áslaug wife of King Ragnar.

== See also ==
- Skald
- Skaldic poetry
