= Svínfellingar =

Medieval Icelandic clan

The Svínfellings (or Svínfellingar) were a family clan in the medieval Icelandic Commonwealth. They ruled the Eastern Region of Iceland. Their forefather was Flosi, one of the Burners of Njal. Their name is derived from the clan's Svínafell homestead in Öræfi.
