= Icelandic Commonwealth =

c. 930–1262 state in Iceland

Coordinates: 65°N 18°W

Icelandic Commonwealth Íslenska þjóðveldið (Icelandic)
- c. 930–1262
- Quarters of Icelandic Commonwealth established in 960 AD
- Status: Stateless commonwealth
- Capital: Þingvellir
- Common languages: Old Norse (later Old Icelandic)
- Religion: Old Norse religion (official before 1000); Roman Catholicism (official after 1000)
- Demonym: Norse: Icelandic
- Important chieftains (goðar)
  - 1199–1238: Sturla Sighvatsson
  - 1208–1245: Kolbeinn ungi Arnórsson
  - 1210–1256: Þórður kakali Sighvatsson
  - 1208–1268: Gissur Þorvaldsson
  - 1214–1284: Sturla Þórðarson
- Lawspeaker
  - 985–1001: Þorgeir Ljósvetningagoði
  - 1004–1030: Skapti Þóroddsson
  - 1031–1033: Steinn Þorgestsson
  - 1034–1053: Þorkell Tjörvason
  - 1054–1062/1072–1074: Gellir Bolverksson
  - 1063–1065/1075: Gunnar Þorgrímsson the Wise
  - 1066–1071: Kolbeinn Flosason
  - 1076–1083: Sighvatur Surtsson
  - 1084–1107: Markús Skeggjason
  - 1108–1116: Úlfhéðinn Gunnarsson
  - 1117–1122: Bergþór Hrafnsson
  - 1215–1218/1222–1231: Snorri Sturluson
  - 1248–1250/1252: Ólafur Þórðarson
  - 1251: Sturla Þórðarson
- Legislature: Lögrétta of Alþingi
- Historical era: High Middle Ages
  - Alþingi established: c. 930
  - Norwegian kingship: 1262
Preceded by	Succeeded by
Settlement of Iceland	Kingdom of Norway
- Today part of: Iceland

The Icelandic Commonwealth, (Note: Icelandic: Þjóðveldið Ísland, Old Norse: Íslands þjóðveldi) also known as the Icelandic Free State, was the political unit existing in Iceland between the establishment of the Althing (Icelandic: Alþingi) in 930 and the pledge of fealty to the Norwegian king with the Old Covenant in 1262. With the probable exception of hermitic Irish monks known as Papar, Iceland was an uninhabited island until around 874.

The Icelandic Commonwealth had a unique political system whereby chieftains (goðar) established a common legal code and settled judicial disputes at the Althing, a national assembly. However, there was no executive body in Iceland that enforced the legal code. The Icelandic Commonwealth has consequently been characterized as a stateless society. During the 13th century, Iceland came under the control of the Kingdom of Norway.

== Goðorð system ==
The medieval Icelandic state had a unique judicial structure. The first settlers of Iceland were greatly influenced by their Norwegian roots when creating their own form of government. They wanted to avoid the strong centralized authority of Harald Fairhair from which some of them had fled, but they also wanted to replicate the Norwegian tradition of laws and district legal assemblies (Þing). This created a unique structure.

The most powerful and elite leaders in Iceland were the chieftains (sing. goði, pl. goðar). The office of the goði was called the goðorð. The goðorð was not delimited by strict geographical boundaries. Thus, a free man could choose to support any of the goðar of his district. The supporters of the goðar were called Þingmenn ("assembly people"). In exchange for the goði protecting his interests, the Þingmaðr would provide armed support to his goði during feuds or conflicts. The Þingmenn were also required to attend regional and national assemblies.

On a regional level, the goðar of the thirteen district assemblies convened meetings every spring to settle local disputes. The goðar also served as the leaders of the Alþingi, the national assembly of Iceland. Today, the Alþingi is the oldest parliamentary institution in existence. It began with the regional assembly at Kjalarnes established by Þorsteinn Ingólfsson, son of the first settler. The leaders of the Kjalarnessþing appointed a man named Úlfljótr to study the laws in Norway. He spent three years in Norway and returned with the foundation of Úlfljótr's Law, which would form the basis for Iceland's national assembly. Sections of his law code are preserved in the Landnámabók, ("Book of Settlements"). The first Alþingi assembly convened around the year 930 at Þingvellir, ("Assembly Plains"). The Alþingi served as a public gathering at which people from all over the country met for two weeks every June. The Alþingi revolved around the Lögrétta, the legislative council of the assembly, which was responsible for reviewing and amending the nation's laws. The Lögrétta comprised the 39 goðar and their advisors. They also appointed a Lawspeaker (lögsögumaður) once every three years. The Lawspeaker recited and clarified laws at Lögberg ("Law Rock"), located at the center of Þingvellir. The descendants of Ingólfr Arnarson, the first settler of Iceland, held the ceremonial position of allsherjargoði and had the role of sanctifying the Alþingi each year.

== Court system ==
Iceland was divided into four administrative regions called fjórðungar (farthings). Each of these was ruled by nine goðar. The Alþingi was made up of the four Quarter Courts (fjórðungsdómur). This judicial body of Iceland consisted of 36 judges, each appointed by one of the goðar. These courts tried individual cases and served as a higher judicial authority to the regional courts. The rulings of the quarter judges had to be agreed upon by a strong majority: if only six of the judges disagreed, then the case was deadlocked and dismissed. In 1005, this problem was solved by the creation of a Fifth Court, an appeals court based on a simple majority. Once a court decided a party was guilty, however, it had no executive authority to carry out a sentence. Instead, enforcement of a verdict became the responsibility of the injured party or his family.

Penalties often included financial compensation or outlawry. However, these were considered by some to be insufficient penalties and the Alþingi was only moderately successful at stopping feuds. According to Magnus Magnusson, the courts were "an uneasy substitute for vengeance." The most severe punishments were outlawry and three years' exile. Outlaws lost all property rights and could be killed without any punishment for the killers. Exiles who failed to leave Iceland became outlaws.

Historian Birgir Solvason states that Icelandic society was "more peaceful and cooperative than its contemporaries". In England and Norway, by contrast, "the period from about 800 to 1200 is a period of continuous struggle; high in both violence and killings". Historian Jón Viðar Sigurðsson argues that the introduction of Christianity to Iceland illustrates how effective and significant arbitration was in Iceland. At the Christianisation of Iceland in 1000, the Alþingi outlawed public celebration of pagan rituals and decreed that in order to prevent an invasion, all Icelanders must be baptized.

In 1117, the Law code of the Icelandic Commonwealth was put into writing, becoming known as the Gray Goose Laws.

=== Life within the system ===
Knowledge of the system of government in medieval Iceland stems mainly from two main primary sources: the written law code, and Íslendingabók, or the Book of the Icelanders by Ari the Learned. The impact of the legislative and judicial systems on Icelandic settlers is a common theme in many of the other Icelandic sagas. Works such as Njáls saga and the Laxdæla saga give many details, but their accuracy has been disputed. Eyrbyggja saga details the transition from paganism to Christianity within Icelandic settlement under the direction of Snorri Goði, or "Snorri the Priest." The emphasis on justice and the conviction in their system of governance is reflected within the saga: "They say we shall suffer setbacks in court; we must plead for support from powerful chieftains: but Arnkel will argue an eloquent case, he will sway judge and jury – I have faith in justice."

Chieftains were highly reliant on the support of farmers in their domain in the 11th and 12th centuries, and did thus not have princely powers or subjects in the districts that they represented. Around 1190, the number of chieftaincies declined and power started to centralize in individual chieftains controlling larger regions of the country. By ca 1220, the country was a loose federation of 10–12 regional powers.

According to historian Jón Viðar Sigurðsson, "a chieftain based his power on his personal qualities, his wealth, friends, assembly men, kinsmen and in-laws. The cleverest, the most helpful, the wealthiest and the most generous became the most powerful ones." Historian Árni Daniel Júliusson further notes that the food production of the peasantry was the "basis of political and military power".

Peasant rebellions, traditionally defined, never occurred in Iceland, even though peasant unrest was fairly common.

Slavery was practiced in Iceland from settlement to the early 12th century. Icelandic law allowed individuals guilty of theft or failure to pay debts to be enslaved. Slaves were allowed to marry and have children, which meant that a class of slaves could self-perpetuate. Slavery likely declined in the second half of the 12th century and was extremely rare by the 15th century.

== Warfare ==
The followers of the goðar owed them military service. They were organized into platoons or companies based on their social status and equipment, and these formed expeditionary armies or leiðangrs. Icelandic military tradition of the time closely followed developments in Norway. No organized cavalry formations or formations of troops equipped with projectile weapons are recorded: instead the bulk of the forces were formed in units of light, medium and heavy infantry, with bowmen or slingers distributed among the infantry units, operating as light support skirmishers. Before the end of the Commonwealth, at least 21 fortresses and castles had been built in Iceland. During the Age of the Sturlungs, the average battle involved fewer than 1000 men, with an average casualty rate of only 15%. This relatively low casualty rate might be attributed to the blood-feud mentality which permeated Icelandic society, which meant that the defeated army could not honourably be slaughtered to a man.

== Religion ==
The first Bishop of Skalholt was Ísleifur Gissurarson, who was elected by the Althing in 1056. After his son Gissur was installed as bishop, the power and wealth of the church quickly grew due to the introduction of tithing, the first tax introduced in Iceland. The church became the second unifying institution in the country after the Althing. Continuing similar patterns from the pre-Christian era, church estates could be owned by goðar who would then get a portion of the tithe.

== Decline and fall ==
In the early 13th century, the Age of the Sturlungs, the Commonwealth began to suffer from chaos and division resulting from internal disputes. Originally, the goðar (chieftains) functioned more as a contractual relationship than a fixed geographic chieftaincy. However, by 1220 this form of communal leadership was replaced by dominant regional individuals who battled with one another for more control. One historian argues the chaos and violence of this period stem from an imbalance of power and changes in the nature of Icelandic warfare. Whereas the number of goðar had been at least 39 early in the Icelandic Commonwealth, a few powerful families had consolidated control over most of the goðorð in the late 12th century.

There are several factors that may have resulted in the consolidation of goðorð. The separation of secular and ecclesiastical power led some families and regional networks to become stronger at the expense of others, leading to an imbalance of power. The introduction of tithe may have increased the wealth of chieftains that controlled the churches. The introduction of pitched battles and harassment of farmers on a regional basis raised the stakes and dangers, which may have incentivized consolidation. An increase in population along with a resource shortage may have made commoners more dependent on chieftains.

The King of Norway began to exert pressure on his Icelandic vassals to bring the country under his rule. He commissioned Icelandic chieftains to become part of his body of retainers and to pursue his interests in Iceland. The King's role in Icelandic affairs started in 1220, and had become strong by 1240 (Icelanders were starting to accept the King's choice of chieftains). Over the period 1240–1260, the King consolidated power in Iceland. A combination of discontent with domestic hostilities and pressure from the King of Norway led the Icelandic chieftains to accept Norway's Haakon IV as king by the signing of the Gamli sáttmáli ("Old Covenant") in 1262. According to historian Sverrir Jakobsson, three Icelanders played a central role in bringing Iceland under the King of Norway: Gissur Þorvaldsson (for getting farmers to agree to pay taxes to the King), Hrafn Oddsson (for pressuring Gissur into supporting the King, and getting farmers in the Westfjords to submit to the King) and bishop Brandur Jónsson (for getting his relatives in the East Fjords to submit to the King).

By 1264, all Icelandic chieftains had sworn allegiance to the King of Norway. The end of the Icelandic Commonwealth is typically dated to the Old Covenant (1262–1264) or to the adoption of Jónsbók in 1281.

== Contemporary libertarian perspectives ==
According to the libertarian theorist David D. Friedman, "Medieval Icelandic institutions have several peculiar and interesting characteristics; they might almost have been invented by a mad economist to test the lengths to which market systems could supplant government in its most fundamental functions." While not directly labeling it anarcho-capitalist, he argues that the legal system came close to being a real-world anarcho-capitalist legal system. Although noting that there was a single legal system, Friedman argues that enforcement of the law was entirely private and highly capitalist, providing some evidence of how such a society would function. "Even where the Icelandic legal system recognized an essentially 'public' offense, it dealt with it by giving some individual (in some cases chosen by lot from those affected) the right to pursue the case and collect the resulting fine, thus fitting it into an essentially private system." Commenting on its political structure, libertarian scholar Roderick Long remarks:

The legal system's administration, insofar as it had one, lay in the hands of a parliament of about 40 officers whom historians call, however inadequately, "chieftains". This parliament had no budget and no employees; it met only two weeks per year. In addition to their parliamentary role, chieftains were empowered in their own local districts to appoint judges and to keep the peace; this latter job was handled on an essentially fee-for-service basis. The enforcement of judicial decisions was largely a matter of self-help (hence Iceland's reputation as a land of constant private feuding), but those who lacked the might to enforce their rights could sell their court-decreed claims for compensation to someone more powerful, usually a chieftain; hence even the poor and friendless could not be victimized with impunity. The basis of a chieftain's power within the political order was the power he already possessed outside it, in civil society. The office of chieftaincy was private property, and could be bought or sold; hence chieftaincies tended to track private wealth. But wealth alone was not enough. As economic historian Birgir Solvason notes in his masterful study of the period, "just buying the chieftainship was no guarantee of power"; the mere office by itself was "almost worthless" unless the chieftain could "convince some free-farmers to follow him". Chieftains did not hold authority over territorially-defined districts, but competed for clients with other chieftains from the same geographical area.

Summarizing his research, Friedman concludes in part:

It is difficult to draw any conclusion from the Icelandic experience concerning the viability of systems of private enforcement in the twentieth century. Even if Icelandic institutions worked well then, they might not work in a larger and more interdependent society. And whether the Icelandic institutions did work well is a matter of controversy; the sagas are perceived by many as portraying an essentially violent and unjust society, tormented by constant feuding. It is difficult to tell whether such judgments are correct."

A 2021 study by economists Vincent Geloso and Peter T. Leeson concluded that:

The data available for comparing living standards in Iceland and other territories in medieval Europe—data on human height, wages, and population growth—are sparse, crude, and therefore challenging to interpret. But a basic picture is apparent nonetheless and suggests a negative conclusion if not a positive one. Living standards in state-governed medieval Europe do not seem to have been higher than they were in Iceland. Anarcho-capitalists, it seems, are not insane.

Friedman and Bruce L. Benson argued that the Icelandic Commonwealth saw significant economic and social progress in the absence of systems of criminal law, an executive, or bureaucracy.

== See also ==
- History of Iceland
- History of Icelandic nationality
- Icelandic nobility
- Settlement of Iceland
- Sagas of Icelanders
