= Sturlungar =

13th-century Icelandic family clan

The Sturlungs (Icelandic: Sturlungar [ˈstʏ(r)tluŋkar̥]) were a powerful family clan in 13th-century Iceland, in the time of the Icelandic Commonwealth. Their story is partly told in Sturlunga saga, and members of the clan were significant participants in the civil war of the Age of the Sturlungs. The Sturlungs were a wealthy and influential clan. They controlled western Iceland, the Westfjords and northeastern Iceland.

The patriarch of the Sturlungs was Sturla Þórðarson, whom scholars believe was born around 1115. He inherited his goðorð (domain, realm or area of influence) from his father Þórður Gilsson. Sturla quarrelled extensively with Einar Þorgilsson of Staðarhóll and many other chieftains. Jón Loftsson, a well-respected man, mediated in one of these disputes. Following this, he was entrusted with the upbringing of Sturla's son Snorri Sturluson, who later became the most influential of the Sturlungs and the most famous because of his literary endeavours. Snorri had two brothers, Þórður Sturluson and Sighvatur Sturluson.

The descendants of Sturla played an important role in the Age of the Sturlungs civil war, most notably his sons Snorri and Sighvatur, and Sighvatur's son Þórður kakali Sighvatsson. Another notable Sturlung was Sturla Þórðarson, son of Þórður Sturluson, who fought with Þórður kakali. He wrote Íslendinga saga, the longest part of Sturlunga saga, and Hákonar saga gamla, the story of Haakon IV of Norway. Some scholars also attribute to him the authorship of Kristni saga and a transcript of Landnámabók.

The writing of the Icelandic sagas began with the Sturlungs, and many of those written before 1280 were their work, or were written at their behest.
