= Íslendinga saga =

Norse contemporary saga

Íslendinga saga (Saga of Icelanders) makes up a large part of Sturlunga saga, a compilation of secular contemporary sagas written in thirteenth-century Iceland. The terminus ante quem of the compilation is disputed (between the options 1308 or 1353).

Íslendinga saga has been a major source of material for historians concerning events in early 13th century Iceland. The author is commonly believed to have been Icelandic chieftain, Sturla Þórðarson. The style of Íslendinga saga has been called admirable, due to its frankness, openness and impartiality — historians largely seem to agree that it gives a fairly accurate picture of Iceland in the 13th century, if only because the author or authors would have been dealing with contemporary events.

If the author was Sturla Þórðarson (which is generally agreed), he spoke of himself, like Julius Caesar, in the third person. He can be understood as a particularly well informed source, since he was related to or befriended with most of the participants in the politics of the era. Other sources confirm that by calling him a model of moderation.

== Other sources ==
- Vigfússon, Guðbrandur; Sturla Þórðarson (2010) Sturlunga Saga: Including the Islendinga Saga of Lawman Sturla Thordsson and Other Works, Volume 1 (Nabu Press) ISBN 978-1-143-71844-1
- Þórðarson, Sturla (2008) Sturlunga Saga: Including the Islendinga Saga of Lawman Sturla Thordsson and Other Works, Volume II (BiblioBazaar) ISBN 978-0-559-38944-3
- Torearson, Sturla (2008) Sturlunga Saga: Including the Islendinga Saga of Lawman Sturla Thordsson and Other Works, Volume II (BiblioLife) ISBN 978-0-559-38946-7

== See also ==
- Sauðafell Raid
