= Ásbirningar =

Medieval Icelandic family clan

The Ásbirnings or Ásbirningar (Old Norse: [ˈɑːsˌbirneŋɡɑz̠]; Modern Icelandic: [ˈausˌpɪ(r)tniŋkar̥]) were a powerful family clan in the medieval Icelandic Commonwealth. They dominated Skagafjörður in the 12th and 13th centuries until their last leader died in the Battle of Haugsnes (Haugsnesbardagi) in 1246. The Ásbirnings were well-known warriors and politicians. The best known Ásbirning is probably Kolbeinn Tumason, a famous Icelandic poet. Other well known Ásbirningur were Kolbeinn ungi Arnórsson, nephew of Kolbeinn Tumason, and scholar Ingunn Arnórsdóttir.
