= Sturla Sighvatsson =

Medieval Icelandic chieftain

Sturla Sighvatsson (Old Norse: [ˈsturlɑ ˈsiɣˌxwɑtsˌson]; Modern Icelandic: [ˈstʏrtla ˈsɪɣˌkʰvatˌsɔːn]; 1199 – 21 August 1238) was an Icelandic chieftain or goði of the Sturlungar family clan who played an active role in the armed conflicts in Iceland during the Age of the Sturlungs (Icelandic: Sturlungaöld).

Sturla was the son of Sighvatur Sturluson, brother of saga-writer Snorri Sturluson and lived on a farmstead in Sauðafell. Like his uncle, Sturla became a vassal to King Haakon IV of Norway, and fought to extend his influence in Iceland. Sturla was killed in the Battle of Örlygsstaðir.

== See also ==
- Sauðafell Raid
