= Gothi =

Priest or tribal Scandinavian leader

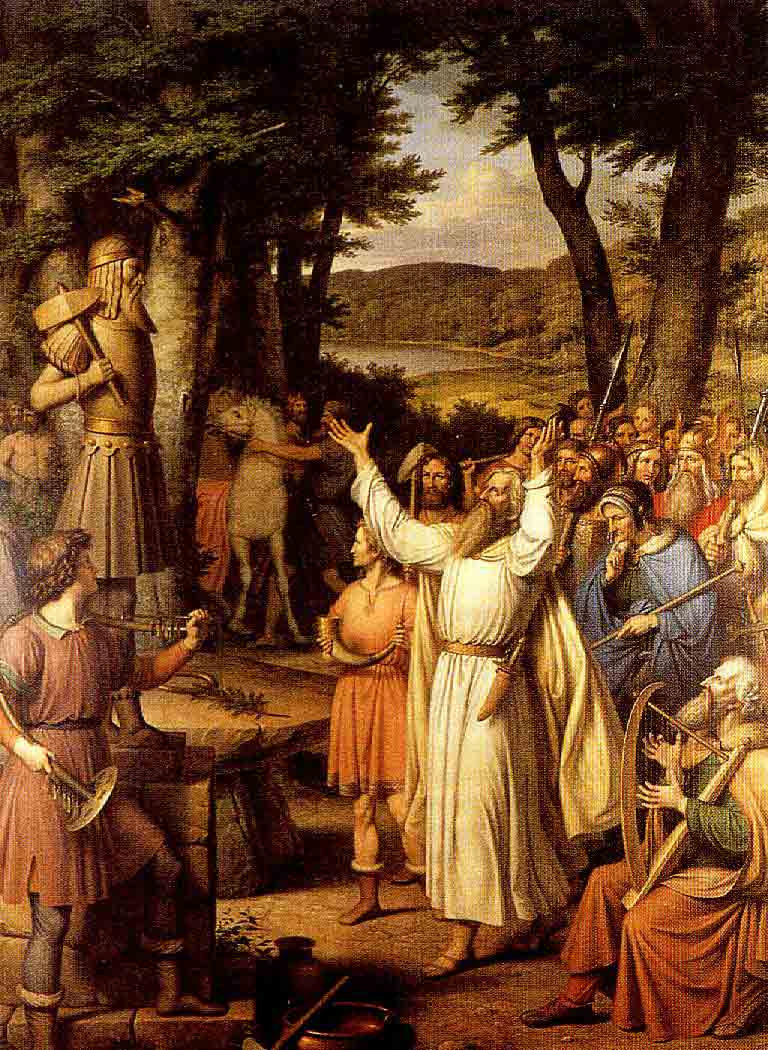
A depiction of a goði leading the people in sacrificing to Thor in this painting by J. L. Lund

Gothi or goði (plural goðar, fem. gyðja; Old Norse: guþi) was a position of political and social prominence in the Icelandic Commonwealth. The term originally had a religious significance, referring to a pagan leader responsible for a religious structure and communal feasts, but the title is primarily known as an expression for the secular political power in medieval Iceland, yet on the other side representing the enhanced power of the lay community of the Church in the Icelandic Commonwealth, throughout the Civil Wars era of the extended North Sea realm (1130-1241). The implications of the Concordat of Worms "solving" the Investiture Controversy were immense as the distinction and braiding of the secular and the religious dimensions and spheres of interest had its more or less unique character, ideals and traditions, particularly guarded by the Icelanders whose establishment on Iceland and might in the North Atlantic was spurred by resistance to the new more autocratic form of royal power that emerged as the Carolingian Empire emerged, examplified by King Harald Fairhair, and King Æthelstan in Norway and England respectively. The kingship remained electorial, but with this novel form of feudalism the king exercised the power to appoint and disappoint his electors (cf. jarl, or earl, and hersir). The system of the goði in the Commonwealth, called Goðorð, retained the elder bottom-up structure, where a number of hersir held electoral powers over a jarl (an earl). The jarls (earls) held electoral powers over the king, as the lesser kings over the high king. Following the unification of Norway into the Realm of Harald King Fairhar, and the reversal of the old system, Iceland was settled. Many of the settlers of Iceland held hereditary rights and titles in Norway and other places where they came from; thus for pragmatic reasons they leveled out former distinctions, attributed to those who had a voice at the Alþhing. Until the papal interdictum put on the entire Archdiocese of Nidaros, to which the dioceses of Hólar and Skalholt on Iceland, the Icelandic goðar also had a common voice and some electoral power in regard of accepting the appointed Bishops.

== Etymology ==
The word derives from goð, meaning "god". It possibly appears in Ulfilas' Gothic language translation of the Bible as gudja for "priest", although the corresponding form of this in Icelandic would have been an unattested *gyði. In Scandinavia, there is one surviving attestation in the Proto-Norse form gudija from the Norwegian Nordhuglo runestone (N KJ65), and in the later Old Norse form guþi from three Danish runestones: DR 190 Helnæs, DR 192 Flemløse 1 and DR 209 Glavendrup. There are a few placenames, such as Gudby in Södermanland, Sweden, that probably retain the name. Otherwise, there are no further surviving attestations except from Iceland where the goðar would be of historical significance.

== History ==
=== Mainland Scandinavia ===
Ragnhildr placed this stone in memory of Alli the Pale, priest [goða] of the sanctuary, honourable þegn of the sanctuary-retinue.

— Inscription from the Glavendrup stone

From the pagan era in mainland Scandinavia, the only sources for the title are runestones. The Norwegian Nordhuglo stone from around AD 400 seems to place the title in opposition to magic, using a word related to the Old Norse gandr. The inscription's Ek gudija ungandiz means "I, gudija" followed by "he who is immune to sorcery" or "he who does not engage in sorcery". The three Danish stones are all from Funen. The early Viking Age Helnæs and Flemløse 1 stones provide no details about the function of a guþi, but mention a guþi named Roulv whose name also appears on two other runestones, the lost Avnslev stone and the Flemløse 2 stone. The early 10th-century Glavendrup stone uses the term for a local dignitary who was associated with a vé, which is a religious structure. It thus attaches the title to a simultaneously secular and religious upper strata.

=== Iceland ===
The most reliable sources about the goðar in Iceland are the Gray Goose Laws, the Landnámabók and the Sturlunga saga. After the settlement of Iceland, a hofgoði was usually a wealthy and respected man in his district, for he had to maintain the communal hall or hof in which community religious observances and feasts were held. The office over which a goði had leadership was termed a goðorð, a word that only appears in Icelandic sources. Initially many independent goðorð were established, until they united under the Althing around 930. In 964, the system was fixed under a constitution that recognized 39 goðorð. The role of the goðar as secular leaders is shown in how the word was used synonymously with höfðingi, meaning chieftain. Over time, and especially after 1000, when the Christian conversion occurred in Iceland, the term lost all religious connotations and came to mean liege-lord or chieftain of the Icelandic Commonwealth. A goðorð could be bought, shared, traded or inherited. If a woman inherited a goðorð she had to leave the leadership to a man. The office was in many respects treated as private property but was not counted as taxable, and is defined in the Gray Goose Laws as "power and not wealth" (veldi er þat en æigi fe); nevertheless the goðar are frequently portrayed in the sagas as concerned with money and expected to be paid for their services.

During the Icelandic Commonwealth, the responsibilities of a goði or goðorðsmaður ("goðorð man") included the annual organization of the local assemblies várþing in the spring and leið in the autumn. At the national Althing, they were voting members of the Lögrétta, the legislative section of the assembly. When quarter courts were introduced in the 960s, the goðar became responsible for nominating judges for the Althing courts. When a court of appeals was established in the early 11th century, they also nominated judges for this court. Further, they had a few formal and informal executive roles, such as confiscating the property of outlaws. They also had a central role in the redistribution of wealth, by holding feasts, giving gifts, making loans, extending hospitality, as well as pricing and helping to distribute imported goods. The holder of the goðorð of the descendants of Ingólfr Arnarson, the first Scandinavian to settle permanently in Iceland, had the ceremonial role of sanctifying the Althing each year, and was called the allsherjargoði ("all-people goði"). The followers of a goði were called þingmenn. Every free landowner in possession of a certain amount of property was required to be associated with a goði, although he was free to choose which one—a goðorð was not a geographical unit. The goði would help his þingmenn to bring cases before the court and to enforce their rights, and the þingmenn would in return provide the goði with armed manpower for his feuds and carry out legal sentences.

By the 13th century, all the goðorð were controlled by five or six families and often united under office holders who in modern studies are known as storgoðar ("great goðar") or storhöfðingjar ("great chieftains"). These goðar struggled for regional and sometimes national power, and occasionally sought to become retainers for the Norwegian king. The institution came to an end when the major goðar pledged fealty to king Haakon IV of Norway in 1262–1264, signing the Old Covenant, and the Norwegian crown abolished the goðorð system.

Originally there were 36 goðorð in Iceland, 9 in each Farthing. They were as follows:

In the Farthing of the Eastfjorders there were Goðorð Hofverja í Vopnafirði, Goðorð Krossvíkinga, Goðorð Þrymlinga (also known as Goðorð Njarðvíkinga), Goðorð Hrafnkelsniðja, Goðorð Fljótsdæla, Goðorð Hofverja í Álftafirði, Goðorð Hrollaugsniðja, Goðorð Freysgyðlinga (also known as Goðorð Svínfellinga) and Goðorð Leiðylfinga.

In the Farthing of the Southerners, there were Dalverjagoðorð, Goðorð Hofverja á Rangárvöllum (also known as Oddaverjagoðorð), Goðorð Hlíðverja, Flóamannagoðorð, Goðorð Mosfellinga (also known as Goðorð Haukdæla), Ölfusingagoðorð, Allsherjargoðorð, Lundarmannagoðorð and Reykhyltingagoðorð.

In the Farthing of the Westfjorders, there were Gilsbekkingagoðorð, Stafhyltingagoðorð, Mýramannagoðorð, Rauðmelingagoðorð (also known as Hítdælagoðorð), Þórsnesingagoðorð, Hvammverjagoðorð (also known as Snorrungagoðorð), Reyknesingagoðorð, Dýrfirðingagoðorð og Vatnsfirðingagoðorð.

In the Farthing of the Northerners there were Víðdælagoðorð, Vatnsdælagoðorð, Æverlingagoðorð, Goðorð Sæmundar hins suðreyska, Goðdælagoðorð, Goðorð Höfða-Þórðar, Esphælingagoðorð, Þveræingagoðorð and Reykdælagoðorð. From 965 three more goðorð were added to the Farthing of the Northerners, Möðruvellingagoðorð (also known as Fljótamannagoðorð), Ljósvetningagoðorð and Öxfirðingagoðorð.

== Neopaganism ==
In the early 1970s, the words goði, goðorð and allsherjargoði were adopted by the Icelandic neopagan organization Ásatrúarfélagið. Following this, goði, godi or gothi is often used as a priestly title by modern adherents of various denominations of Germanic neopaganism.

== See also ==
- Feudalism
- Hestavíg
- Sacred king
- Divine right of kings
- Thingmen
- Volkhv
- Vitki
