= Kolbeinn ungi Arnórsson =

Icelandic chieftain (1208–1245)

Kolbeinn ungi Arnórsson (1208 – 22 July 1245) was an Icelandic chieftain or goði of the Ásbirningar family clan. He fought with Gissur Þorvaldsson against the Sturlungs in the Icelandic civil war during the Age of the Sturlungs. His homestead was in Víðimýri in Skagafjörður. He was married to Hallbera Snorradóttir, the daughter of Icelandic historian and poet Snorri Sturluson.
