= Sturlunga saga =

Norse contemporary saga

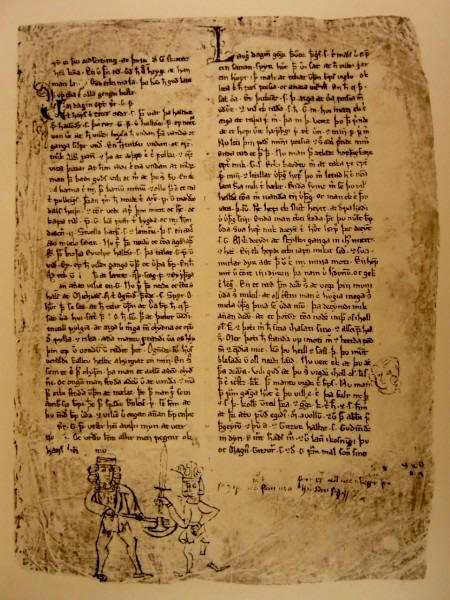
Manuscript AM 122 a fol. Sturlunga saga (University of Iceland).

Sturlunga saga (often called simply Sturlunga) is a collection of Icelandic sagas by various authors from the 12th and 13th centuries; it was assembled in about 1300, in Old Norse. It mostly deals with the story of the Sturlungs, a powerful family clan during the eponymous Age of the Sturlungs period of the Icelandic Commonwealth.

Sturlunga saga mostly covers the history of Iceland between 1117 and 1264. It begins with Geirmundar þáttr heljarskinns, the legend of Geirmundr heljarskinn, a regional ruler in late 9th-century Norway, who moves to Iceland to escape the growing power of King Harald Finehair. The more historical sagas commence in 1117 with Þorgils saga ok Hafliða. Other sagas included in the collection are Sturlu saga, Prestssaga Guðmundar Arasonar, Guðmundar saga biskups, Hrafns saga Sveinbjarnarsonar, Þórðar saga kakala, Svínfellinga saga and Íslendinga saga, composed by Sturla Þórðarson, which constitutes almost half of the compilation and covers the period 1183–1264. The compiler assembled the components in chronological order, added þættir including Geirmundar þáttr and Haukdæla þáttr and genealogies, and endeavoured to combine them into a single work, usually replacing the beginning and the ending with a linking passage. In some cases he broke up sagas to achieve chronological order. The compilation is often thought of as containing the main texts belonging to the textual corpus (or sub-genre) commonly referred to as the samtíðarsögur or 'contemporary sagas'. While it has been treated as a purely historical source, recent decades show acknowledgement that these are constructed texts representing a narrativised version of the past.

Sturlunga saga is the main source of Icelandic history during the 12th and 13th centuries and was written by people who experienced the internal power struggle which ended in Iceland's loss of sovereignty and submission to Norway in 1262–1264; the descriptions of wounds in Íslendinga saga are so detailed that they may be based on eyewitness accounts used in compensation claims. It is also indispensable for the details of social history which it contains. Indirect evidence suggests that it was compiled by Þórðr Narfason (d. 1308), who may also have written Geirmundar þáttr and Haukdæla þáttr and possibly also Sturlu þáttr.

The work is preserved in somewhat differing versions in two defective Western Icelandic parchments dating to the second half of the 14th century, the Króksfjarðarbók and the Reykjafjarðarbók (AM 122 a fol. and AM 122 b fol.), and in 17th-century paper manuscripts derived from these. The former also contains material from Hákonar saga Hákonarsonar; the latter contains interpolations from Þorgils saga Skarða and also contains Sturlu þáttr and two sagas which are not usually counted as part of Sturlunga saga, Jartegna saga Guðmundar biskups and Arna saga biskups.

It has been translated into English by Julia H. McGrew, with the occasional assistance of Sigurður Nordal. This translation features oddities such as excerpts from a letter or a Lorem ipsum placeholder in the middle of the text.
