= List of Icelanders =

This is a list of notable people from Iceland, arranged in categories and ordered alphabetically by first name, following the usual naming conventions of Iceland.

== Business ==
- Björgólfur Thor Björgólfsson, billionaire entrepreneur
- Björgólfur Guðmundsson, former billionaire entrepreneur, father of Thor Björgólfsson (above)
- Eggert Magnússon, businessman and former chairman of the English Premiership football club West Ham United
- Hreiðar Már Sigurðsson, businessman
- Jón Ásgeir Jóhannesson, billionaire and founder of the Bónus supermarket and the Baugur Group
- Magnús Þorsteinsson, businessman
- Arnor Sighvatsson, economist

== Arts and culture ==
=== Architects ===
- Guðjón Samúelsson
- Guðmundur Jónsson
- Halldóra Briem
- Högna Sigurðardóttir

=== Authors ===
- Anne Carson, writer, Nobel Prize in Literature 2026, granted Icelandic citizenship in April 2022
- Arnaldur Indriðason, writer
- Davíð Stefánsson, poet
- Einar Benediktsson, writer, poet
- Einar Kárason, writer
- Einar Hjörleifsson Kvaran, editor, novelist, poet, dramatist
- Einar Már Guðmundsson, writer
- Guðmundur G. Hagalín, writer, poet
- Gunnar Gunnarsson, writer
- Halldór Kiljan Laxness, writer, poet, Nobel Prize in Literature 1955
- Hallgrímur Helgason, writer
- Jón Kalman Stefánsson, writer, poet
- Jón Sveinsson, writer
- Jón Thoroddsen, author
- Jónas Hallgrímsson, writer, poet
- Halldóra Bjarnadóttir, educator, author
- Jóhannes úr Kötlum, writer, poet
- Kristín Marja Baldursdóttir, writer
- Magnus Magnusson, television presenter, writer
- Nína Björk Árnadóttir, poet, novelist, playwright
- Ólafur Jóhann Ólafsson, writer
- Sjón, poet, writer, lyricist
- Snorri Hjartarson, poet
- Snorri Sturluson, historian, poet
- Steinunn Sigurðardóttir, writer, poet
- Stephan G. Stephansson, Western Icelander, poet
- Tómas Guðmundsson, poet
- Vigdís Grímsdóttir, writer
- Viktor Arnar Ingólfsson, writer
- Yrsa Sigurðardóttir, writer
- Þórarinn Eldjárn, writer, poet
- Þórbergur Þórðarson, writer, poet

=== Film, radio, and TV ===
- Anita Briem, actress
- Ágústa Eva Erlendsdóttir, best known as Silvía Nótt (Silvia Night), actress, singer, model, TV personality.
- Baltasar Kormákur, film actor and film director
- Friðrik Þór Friðriksson, film director
- Gunnar Hansen, film actor
- Hilmir Snær Guðnason, film actor
- Hrafn Gunnlaugsson, film director
- Karl Júlíusson, film production designer/costume designer
- Magnus Magnusson, television presenter, writer
- Magnús Scheving, writer, actor, athlete, creator of LazyTown
- Margrét Vilhjálmsdóttir, actress
- Marinó Sigurðsson, actor
- Markús Örn Antonsson, former mayor of Reykjavík and former director of RÚV
- Páll Magnússon, former director of RÚV, a member of the Icelandic parliament
- Ragnar Bragason, director
- Rósa Ingólfsdóttir, actress
- Stefán Karl Stefánsson, actor
- Tinna Gunnlaugsdóttir, actress and former Artistic Director of the National Theatre of Iceland
- Þröstur Leó Gunnarsson, actor
- Örvar Þóreyjarson Smárason, poet, writer, musician

=== Music ===
- Anna Mjöll, singer-songwriter
- Arndís Halla (born 1969), opera singer, songwriter and entertainer
- Ágústa Eva Erlendsdóttir, more commonly known as Silvía Nótt, singer, actress, and TV personality
- Ásgeir Trausti, singer-songwriter
- Bára Gísladóttir (born 1989), musician and composer
- Björgvin Halldórsson, singer
- Björk Guðmundsdóttir, singer-songwriter more commonly known as Björk
- Bragi Ólafsson, musician
- Daði Freyr, musician
- Diddú (Sigrún Hjálmtýsdóttir), soprano and songwriter
- Emilíana Torrini, singer-songwriter
- Einar Örn Benediktsson, musician
- Eiríkur Hauksson, musician
- Eythor Arnalds, musician
- Gabríel Ólafs, composer
- Garðar Thór Cortes, tenor
- Greta Salóme Stefánsdóttir, singer, violinist
- Gísli Magnússon, pianist
- Gunnsteinn Ólafsson, musician, composer
- Hafdís Bjarnadóttir (born 1977), composer and musician
- Hafdís Huld, singer
- Halldor Mar, songwriter and guitarist
- Haukur Tómasson, composer
- Hildur Guðnadóttir, musician and composer, first solo woman to win a Golden Globe Award for Best Original Score
- Hallgrímur Helgason, composer, conductor, violinist, and musicologist
- Hilmar Örn Hilmarsson, musician, art director, and chief goði of the Icelandic Ásatrú Association
- Jóhann Jóhannsson, composer, musician, producer
- Jón Jósep Snæbjörnsson, (Jónsi) singer
- Jón Leifs, composer
- Jón Þór Birgisson, singer, guitarist
- Jóhanna Guðrún Jónsdóttir, pop singer (Yohanna)
- Kjartan Ólafsson (born 1958), composer, professor
- Laufey Lín Jónsdóttir, musician
- Mugison, composer, musician
- Nanna Bryndís Hilmarsdóttir, musician
- Ólafur Arnalds, composer, musician
- Örvar Þóreyjarson Smárason, poet, writer and musician
- Páll Óskar Hjálmtýsson (Paul Oscar), pop singer, songwriter and disc jockey
- Ragnheiður Gröndal, musician
- Róbert Abraham Ottósson (born Robert Abraham). conductor, musicologist, and pianist
- Sigurður Bragason, baritone singer and composer
- Vladimir Ashkenazy, c pianist, chamber music performer, and conductor

==== Musical bands and groups ====
- Agent Fresco
- Amiina
- Ampop
- Árstíðir
- Bang Gang
- Changer
- Cynic Guru
- Dikta
- FM Belfast
- GusGus
- Kaleo
- HAM
- Hatari
- Mammút
- Mezzoforte
- Mínus
- Mugison
- múm
- Nylon
- Of Monsters and Men
- Quarashi
- Samaris
- Seabear
- Sigur Rós
- Singapore Sling
- Skálmöld
- Ske
- Sólstafir
- The Sugarcubes
- Trúbrot
- Voces Thules
- VÆB

=== Painters and visual artists ===
- Kristleifur Björnsson
- Einar Hákonarson
- Erró
- Jóhannes Sveinsson Kjarval
- Sruli Recht

=== Photographers ===
- Ragnar Axelsson
- Ragnar Th. Sigurdsson

=== Sculptors ===
- Ásmundur Sveinsson
- Bertel Thorvaldsen
- Einar Jónsson
- Gunnfríður Jónsdóttir
- Nína Sæmundsson
- Olafur Eliasson
- Ríkarður Jónsson
- Steinunn Thorarinsdottir

=== Miss World ===
- Hólmfríður "Hófí" Karlsdóttir, Miss World 1985
- Linda Pétursdóttir, Miss World 1988
- Unnur Birna Vilhjálmsdóttir, Miss World 2005

== Historical figures of Iceland ==
- Ari Þorgilsson, priest and author of Íslendingabók, a historical work
- Björn Sveinsson Björnsson, first born son of Sveinn Björnsson, and an Waffen-SS volunteer
- Egill Skallagrímsson, Viking skald
- Eiríkur rauði, (e. Eirík the Red, Old Norse. Eirīkr hinn rauði) named Greenland
- Freydís Eiríksdóttir
- Guðmundur Arason
- Guðríður Þorbjarnardóttir, explorer
- Ingólfur Arnarson
- Ísleifur Gissurarson
- Kolbeinn Tumason
- Leifur Eiríksson (e. Leif Ericson, Old Norse Leifr Eiríksson), discovered America in the year 1000 and named it Vínland (Land of Wine)
- Loftur Sæmundsson, priest and chieftain at Oddi
- Solveig Guðmundsdóttir, heir and landlord
- Snorri Sturluson, historian, poet, knight, and politician
- Þorfinnur "Karlsefni" Þórðarson
- Þorleifur Skaftason, priest and Galdrmaster
- Þorvaldur Eríksson
- Vilhjálmur Stefánsson, Western Icelander, Arctic explorer
- Þóra Magnúsdóttir, born 1100 in Norway, daughter of Magnus III of Norway, a direct descendant of Harald Fairhair the first Norwegian King. Þóra Magnúsdóttir married an Icelander and moved to Iceland.

== Politics ==
- Albert Guðmundsson, former minister
- Árni Sigfússon, politician
- Ásgeir Ásgeirsson, former president
- Bergdis Ellertsdóttir, ambassador
- Birgitta Jónsdóttir, member of parliament
- Björn Bjarnason, minister of justice and ecclesiastical affairs
- Davíð Oddsson, former prime minister and former mayor of Reykjavík
- Geir H. Haarde, former prime minister, former foreign minister
- Guðni Thorlacius Jóhannesson, former president
- Halla Tómasdóttir, current president
- Halldór Ásgrímsson, former prime minister
- Halldór Blöndal, former minister
- Hannes Hafstein, first prime minister
- Hannibal Valdimarsson, chairman of two parties and one electoral alliance
- Hulda Jakobsdóttir (1911–1998), Iceland's first woman mayor
- Jóhanna Sigurðardóttir, former prime minister, also the world's first openly gay head of government
- Jón Baldvin Hannibalsson, former foreign minister, ambassador
- Jón Loftsson, chieftain and politician
- Jón Sigurðsson, independence leader
- Katrín Jakobsdóttir, former Prime minister
- Katrín Magnússon (1858–1932), early Reykjavik municipal councillor and women's rights activist
- Kristján Eldjárn, former president
- Markús Örn Antonsson, former mayor of Reykjavík and former director of RÚV
- Ólafur Ragnar Grímsson, former president
- Sæþór Benjamín Randalsson, party chairman
- Sigmundur Davíð Gunnlaugsson, former prime minister
- Steingrímur Hermannsson, former prime minister
- Sveinn Björnsson, first president
- Vigdís Finnbogadóttir, former president, first elected female head of state
- Þorsteinn Pálsson, former prime minister

== Scholarship and academia ==
- Agnar Helgason, anthropologist
- Ari Brynjolfsson, physicist
- Ari Þorgilsson, documentarian, chronicler
- Ari Trausti Guðmundsson, geologist, explorer, documentarian
- Árni Magnússon, documentarian
- Ásgeir Helgason, psychologist, public health scientist
- Auður Eir Vilhjálmsdóttir, first female priest
- Eiríkur Magnússon, librarian and lecturer at Cambridge University, co-translator with William Morris
- Gisli Gudjonsson, professor of forensic psychology
- Gísli Pálsson, anthropologist
- Guðbrandur Vigfússon, lexicographer, editor, and lecturer at Oxford University
- Guðmundur Eiríksson, judge and law professor
- Hannes Hólmsteinn Gissurarson, political scientist
- Helgi Valdimarsson, immunologist
- Jón Steinsson, economist at University of California, Berkeley
- Hjörtur Þórðarson, inventor
- Kári Stefánsson, founder of deCODE genetics
- Leifur Magnusson, Icelandic-American economist, U.S. Representative to the International Labour Organization
- Magnús Eiríksson, theologian
- Marga Ingeborg Thome, nursing professor
- Margrét Hermanns-Auðardóttir, archaeologist
- Niels Finsen, physician, Nobel Prize winner (Icelandic parents)
- Ólafía Einarsdóttir, archaeologist
- Páll Skúlason, philosopher, former Rector of the University of Iceland
- Reynir Böðvarsson, seismologist
- Sigurdur Helgason, mathematician
- Sigurður Nordal, philosopher
- Sigurður Þórarinsson, geologist, volcanologist, professor
- Snorri Sturluson, documentarian, writer
- Stefán Einarsson, linguist and literary historian
- Vilhjálmur Árnason, philosopher
- Þór Whitehead, historian
- Þorsteinn Gylfason, philosopher

== Sports and games ==
=== Football (soccer) ===
- Rúrik Gíslason, former professional footballer
- Albert Guðmundsson, first Icelandic professional footballer, played for Valur, Rangers, A.C. Milan, Arsenal and FC Nancy.
- Arnór Guðjohnsen, former professional footballer, father of Eiður Guðjohnsen
- Aron Gunnarsson, professional footballer, currently at Al-Gharafa SC
- Ásgeir Sigurvinsson, former professional footballer
- Birkir Bjarnason, former professional footballer
- Eggert Jónsson, professional footballer, currently at Knattspyrnufélag Austfjarða
- Eiður Smári Guðjohnsen, professional footballer, former top scorer for Icelandic national team
- Emil Hallfreðsson, former professional footballer,
- Eyjólfur Héðinsson, professional footballer, currently at ÍR
- Guðni Bergsson, former professional footballer, played for teams such as Tottenham Hotspur F.C. and Bolton Wanderers
- Gylfi Sigurðsson, professional footballer, currently at Víkingur Reykjavík
- Heiðar Helguson, former professional footballer,
- Heimir Hallgrímsson, former manager of the Iceland national football team, also a football player and dentist
- Hermann Hreiðarsson, former professional footballer
- Ívar Ingimarsson, former professional footballer
- Jóhannes Karl Guðjónsson, former professional footballer
- Teitur Thordarson, former professional footballer
- Stefán Teitur Þórðarson, professional footballer, currently at Hannover 96
- Sveindís Jónsdóttir, professional footballer, currently at Angel City FC

=== Chess ===
- Bobby Fischer, former world chess champion, granted Icelandic citizenship on 21 March 2005
- Friðrik Ólafsson, chess grandmaster

=== Handball ===
- Arnór Atlason, former handball player
- Aron Pálmarsson, former handball player
- Guðjón Valur Sigurðsson, former handball player
- Ólafur Stefánsson, former handball player, Rhein-Neckar Löwen. Formerly of Wuppertal, Magdeburg and Ciudad Real.
- Snorri Steinn Guðjónsson, former handball player

=== Strongmen ===
- Benedikt Magnússon, Raw Deadlift world record holder
- Hafþór Júlíus Björnsson, 2018 World's Strongest Man 3 x Arnold Strongman Classic Champion and Deadlift world record holder
- Jón Páll Sigmarsson, 4 x World's Strongest Man
- Magnús Magnússon, winner of Iceland's Strongest Man.
- Magnús Ver Magnússon, 4 x World's Strongest Man
- Stefán Sölvi Pétursson, World's Strongest Man Finalist

=== Others in sports ===
- Anníe Þórisdóttir, back-to-back CrossFit Games winner (2011, 2012)
- Brenton Birmingham (born 1972), American-Icelandic basketball player
- Fiann Paul, fastest ocean rower, most record breaking explorer, most Guinness World Records decorated athlete
- Gunnar Nelson, MMA fighter
- Halldór Helgason, snowboarder
- Katrín Davíðsdóttir, back-to-back CrossFit Games winner (2015, 2016)
- Kristján Einar Kristjánsson, racing driver, currently racing in British formula 3
- Sara Sigmundsdóttir, CrossFit Games athlete
- Vala Flosadóttir, pole vaulter

== Others ==
- Dorrit Moussaieff (born 1950), First Lady of Iceland from 2003 to 2016, jewellery designer, editor, and businesswoman
- Einar Ragnarsson Kvaran, engineer, teacher, genealogist and writer
- Guðrún Erlendsdóttir (1936–2013), first woman to become a judge of the Supreme Court of Iceland
- Sigurlína Ingvarsdóttir (born 1978), video games producer
- Þórunn Jónassen (1850–1922), first chair of Thorvaldsensfélagið and early Reykjavik city councillor
- Vilhelmína Lever (1802–1879), shopkeeper who voted in municipal elections in 1863 and 1866 before women such as her were officially given voting rights
- Leifur Muller (1920–1988), imprisoned by the Nazis in the Grini and Sachsenhausen concentration camps.
