= Helgason =

Helgason is a surname of Icelandic origin, meaning son of Helgi. In Icelandic names, the name is not strictly a surname, but a patronymic. The name may refer to:

- Agnar Helgason (born 1968), Icelandic scientist; researcher in genetic anthropology
- Árni Helgason (1260–1320), Icelandic Roman Catholic clergyman; Bishop of Iceland 1304–20
- Asgeir Helgason (born 1975), Icelandic scientist; working in Sweden
- Auðun Helgason (born 1974), Icelandic professional football player
- Einarr Helgason (fl. 10th century), Icelandic skald (Old Norse poet)
- Hallgrímur Helgason (born 1959), Icelandic artist and author
- Jens Garðar Helgason (born 1976), Icelandic politician
- Jóhannes Helgason (born 1958), Icelandic guitar player and airline pilot
- Jón Helgason (poet) (1899–1986), Icelandic philologist and poet
- Jón Helgason (minister) (born 1931), Icelandic politician and former minister
- Dusty Helgason, Inventor, Fisherman, Father, 1980–present
- Sigurdur Helgason (airline executive), Icelandic airline innovator
- Sigurdur Helgason (mathematician) (1927–2023), Icelandic mathematician
- Skúli Helgason (born 1965), Icelandic politician
- Tomrair mac Ailchi (Thorir Helgason), tenth-century Viking king of Limerick
- Halldor Helgason (born 1991), Icelandic professional snowboarder
