= Blond Eskimos =

Light-haired Inuit from the Coronation Gulf area of Canada

The man in this 1906 lantern slide by the Lomen brothers was described as a "blond Inuit".

Blonde Eskimos or Blond Eskimos is a term first applied in accounts of sightings of, and encounters with, light-haired Inuit (then known as "Eskimo") peoples of Northern Canada from the early 20th century, particularly around the Coronation Gulf between mainland Canada and Victoria Island. Sightings of light-haired natives of the Arctic have been mentioned in written accounts as far back as the 17th century.

== Etymology ==
Christian Klengenberg is credited with having introduced the term "Blonde Eskimo" to Vilhjalmur Stefansson just before Stefansson's visit to the Inuit inhabiting southwestern Victoria Island, in 1910. Stefansson, however, preferred the term "Copper Inuit". Adolphus Greely first compiled the sightings recorded in earlier literature of blonde or fair-haired Arctic natives, and in 1912 published them in the National Geographic Magazine, in an article entitled "The Origin of Stefansson's Blonde Eskimo". Newspapers subsequently popularised the term "Blonde Eskimo", which caught more readers' attention despite Stefansson's preference for "Copper Inuit". Stefansson later referenced Greely's work in his writings, and the term "Blonde Eskimo" came to be applied to sightings of light-haired Inuit from as early as the 17th century.

== Early history of sightings ==
Greely traced the first sighting of light-haired Arctic natives to 1656 when a Dutch trading vessel travelled west from Greenland across the Davis Strait towards Baffin Island. Nicholas Tunes, the captain of the vessel, claimed to have sighted two distinct races, the first being the brownish-skinned Inuit, but the second being a tall, fair-skinned people. Greely also published the eyewitness account of the Lutheran missionary Hans Egede who wrote in 1721 of a blonde "quite handsome and white" indigenous tribe he had discovered in Greenland.

Later sightings include those made by William Edward Parry, who wrote of native inhabitants across the Qikiqtaaluk Region, Canada, as having physical features of Europeans (e.g. blonde hair and light complexions) and later Captain Wilhelm August Graah of the Royal Danish Navy, who in 1821 reported Inuit he met with "complexions scarcely less fair than that of Danish peasantry". British navy officer John Franklin in 1824 also claimed he had come close in contact and even spoken with a "Blonde Eskimo" who had strong European facial features. Greenlandic polar explorer Knud Rasmussen in 1903 further claimed to have found blonde-haired Eskimos "of a different race" in Greenland and parts of Canada.

== Stefansson's speculations ==
In 1910, Stefansson visited the Copper Inuit inhabiting southwestern Victoria Island and Prince Albert Sound. He described meeting many men whose beards and hair were blonde "who looked like typical Scandinavians". In his book My Life with the Eskimo, Stefansson proposed several explanations for those physical features:

- Early mixture with Norse colonists from Greenland
- Mixture with European whalers
- Ancient migration of European-like people from across the Bering Strait

He rejected the second explanation because there had been contact between whalers and Inuit in Alaska for over 100 years, but there were no blonds there. He also said that the Inuit had had greater contact with whalers in the eastern Arctic and thus should have exhibited a greater degree of blondness but, as in Alaska, there were none in evidence.

== Scientific investigation ==
As early as 1922, anthropologists investigated Stefansson's claims but could not come up with an answer to explain the high amount of blondeness in Copper Inuit inhabiting southwestern Victoria Island.

In 2003, two Icelandic scientists, the geneticists and anthropologists Agnar Helgason and Gísli Pálsson announced the results of their research comparing DNA from 100 Cambridge Bay Inuit with DNA from Icelanders, and concluded that there was no match. In 2008, in an article in Current Anthropology, Palsson concludes that recent work "refutes Stefansson's speculations on the Copper Inuit".

== See also ==
- Great Ireland
- White Amazonian Indians
- Helluland
- Finn-men
