= Loftur Sæmundsson =

Icelandic chieftain

Loftur Sæmundsson (died 1163; Modern Icelandic: [ˈlɔftʏr ˈsaiːˌmʏn(t)sˌsɔːn]; Old Norse: Loptr Sæmundsson [ˈloptz̠ ˈsɛːˌmundsˌson]) was a chieftain of Oddi at Rangárvellir in the south part of Iceland. He was a member of the Oddaverjar family clan and was the son of Sæmundur fróði who had established a school at Oddi. He was married to Þóra Magnúsdóttir, daughter of king Magnus III of Norway. Loftur was the father of Jón Loftsson who adopted Snorri Sturluson.
