= Þóra Magnúsdóttir =

Daughter of Magnus III of Norway

Þóra Magnúsdóttir (Old Norse: [ˈθoːrɑ ˈmɑɣnuːsˌdoːtːez̠], Modern Icelandic: [ˈθouːra ˈmaknusˌtouhtɪr̥]; Modern Norwegian: Tora Magnusdatter; born c. 1100) was a daughter of King Magnus III of Norway (Magnus 3 Olavsson Berrføtt).

Þóra married an Icelandic man and moved to Iceland. Her husband, Loftur Sæmundsson was a chieftain of Oddi at Rangárvellir in the south part of Iceland. He was a member of the Oddaverjar clan and son of Icelandic priest and scholar Sæmundur fróði Sigfússon. Their son Jón Loftsson was later chieftain at Oddi.

Descendants of Loftur and Þóra included Þuríður Sturludóttir (born c. 1228), who married Hrafn Oddsson (born c. 1225), a descendant of Skallagrímur Kveldúlfsson (Skalla-Grímr), the father of skald Egill Skallagrímsson. With the birth of Jón korpur Hrafnsson, the feuding clans of the Fairhair and Skalla-Grímr dynasties were united.

== Other sources ==
- Islendingabók (Book of Icelanders)
- Konungasögur (Kings' sagas)
- Egils saga Skallagrímssonar (Egil's saga)
