= Helgesson =

Helgesson is a surname. Notable people with the surname include:

- Joshi Helgesson (born 1993), Swedish figure skater
- Mats Helgesson, Swedish Air Force major general
- Therese Islas Helgesson (born 1983), Swedish handball player
- Tommie Helgesson or Snowy Shaw (born 1968), Swedish heavy metal musician
- Viktoria Helgesson (born 1988), Swedish figure skater

== See also ==
- Helgason
- Helgesen
