= Þuríður Sturludóttir =

Þuríður Sturludóttir (1199–1238; Modern Icelandic: [ˈθʏːrˌiːðʏr ˈstʏ(r)tlʏˌtouhtɪr̥]; Old Norse: Þuríðr Sturludóttir [ˈθurˌiːðz̠ ˈsturloˌdoːtːez̠]) was daughter of Icelandic chieftain Sturla Sighvatsson and Sólveig Sæmundsdóttir. Mother of Jón korpur Hrafnsson in whom the warring clans of Haraldur hárfagri (Harald Fairhair) and Egill Skallagrímsson were genetically united in Iceland in 1255.

The bloodline of Þuríður Sturludóttir from Haraldur hárfagri Hálfdánarson:

- Haraldur “Hárfagri” Hálfdánarson (850) – King in Norway
- Sigurður “Hrísi” Haraldsson (880)
- Hálfdán Sigurðsson (930)
- Sigurður “Sýr” Hálfdánarson (970)
- Haraldur “Harðráði” Sigurðsson (1047) – King in Norway
- Ólafur “Kyrri” Haraldsson (1066) – King in Norway
- Magnús “Berfættur” Ólafsson (1090) – King in Norway
- Þóra Magnúsdóttir (1100)
- Jón Loftsson (1124–1197)
- Sæmundur Jónsson (1154–1222)
- Sólveig Sæmundsdóttir (1200–1244)
- Þuríður Sturludóttir (1228–1288)

== Sources ==
- Islendingabók (Book of Icelanders): http://www.islendingabok.is
- Konungasögur (Kings' sagas)
- Egils saga Skallagrímssonar (Egils saga)
