= White Native Americans =

White Native Americans may refer to:

- Mestizo, a term used in Central and South America to refer to a person of combined European and Indigenous American descent
- Métis, an ethnic group in Canada and parts of the United States of mixed Indigenous North American and European descent
- White Amazonian Indians, a group of white-skinned natives spotted in the Amazon Rainforest from the 16th century by Spanish missionaries

== See also ==
- Multiracial Americans § Native American identity, multiracial people in the United States with a Native American identity
- White Americans#Admixture in non-Hispanic whites, White Americans with American Indian ancestry
