= Arnor =

Arnor may refer to:

== People ==
- Arnor Angeli, Belgian footballer
- Arnór Guðjohnsen, Icelandic footballer
- Arnór Borg Guðjohnsen, Icelandic footballer, his son
- Arnór Hannibalsson, Icelandic philosopher, historian and translator
- Arnór Ingvi Traustason, Icelandic basketball player
- Arnor Njøs, Norwegian soil researcher
- Arnor Sighvatsson, Icelandic economist
- Arnór Smárason, Icelandic footballer
- Arnór Sveinn Aðalsteinsson, Icelandic footballer
- Arnórr jarlaskáld, Icelandic Skald
- Einar Arnórsson, Minister for Iceland
- Jón Arnór Stefánsson, Icelandic basketball player

== Fiction ==
- Arnor (Middle-earth), a kingdom of Men in Tolkien's Middle-earth
- Arnor, a race of beings in the video game Galactic Civilizations II: Twilight of the Arnor
