= Oddaverjaannáll =

Oddaverjaannáll (Old Norse for Oddaverjar's Annals) is a medieval Icelandic chronicle preserved in a 16th-century manuscript. Apart from the chronology of events related to the Oddaverjar family clan, from whom these annals take their name, Oddaverjaannáll describes, as a curious detail, the effects of earthquakes around Iceland's Geysir in an entry from 1294. It is one of the sources that provides information about Sæmundr fróði, confirming that he studied in Paris.

== Bibliography ==
Eldbjørg Haug, The Icelandic Annals as Historical Sources, 1997
