= Hallveig Ormsdóttir =

Icelandic heiress (d. 1241)

Hallveig Ormsdóttir (died 1241) was an Icelandic heiress who became entangled in the feuds of Iceland’s Age of the Sturlungs, as told by Sturlunga saga. Her status as the richest woman in Iceland increased the standing of Snorri Sturluson when she became his financial partner in 1224; she was also his wife or mistress.

== Life ==
=== Early life ===
She was the daughter of the chieftain Ormr Jónsson, foster-brother of Snorri Sturluson, and his concubine Þóra Eiríksdóttir. She had a brother, Jón, and they had several half-siblings from Ormr’s relationship with his other concubine, Borghildr.

In 1218, her father and brother were killed in a dispute over timber. She inherited a large share of her father’s property.

She married Björn son of Þorvaldr Gizurarson, who is described in the saga as generous but impetuous. They had two sons, Ormr and Klængr. Björn sought compensation for the death of Hallveig’s father, killing one man whom he had heard was a relative of his slayer and clashing with Snorri Sturluson over the matter. He was killed by Loftr biskupssonr and Sæmundr Jónsson (Hallveig’s uncle) in a land dispute in 1221.

=== Relationship with Snorri Sturluson ===
The saga depicts Hallveig’s first meeting with Snorri Sturluson as an unpromising one: Snorri laughed at the way she had her hood sewn over her head to protect her from the rain. At the time, Snorri was hoping to marry Hallveig's cousin Solveig Sæmundardóttir.

However, in 1224, when Solveig had married Snorri’s nephew Sturla Sighvatsson, Hallveig became the richest woman in Iceland on the death of her wealthy uncle Kolskeggr. Snorri recruited Hallveig’s father-in-law to persuade her to enter into an equal financial partnership with him. She did so, entering his household. This partnership secured Snorri’s status as the wealthiest and most influential person in Iceland.

The saga is ambiguous as to whether Snorri and Hallveig married. Some scholars treat her as Snorri’s second wife or as having a relationship 'equivalent to a marriage.' They had children together, who did not survive to adulthood, and the saga notes that Snorri considered her death in 1241 a great loss.

=== Inheritance dispute ===
Snorri disputed with Ormr and Klængr, Hallveig’s sons by her first marriage, over the division of her assets. This led to Klængr conspiring to kill him. Snorri’s illegitimate son, Órækja Snorrason, killed Klængr in revenge.
