= Sighvatsson =

Sighvatsson may refer to:

- Þórður kakali Sighvatsson (c. 1210–1256), Icelandic chieftain who fought in the Icelandic civil war during the Age of the Sturlungs
- Arnór Sighvatsson (born 1956), Icelandic economist
- Róbert Sighvatsson (born 1972), Icelandic handball player
- Sigurjón Sighvatsson (born 1952), veteran Icelandic film producer and businessman, born in Reykjavík
- Sturla Sighvatsson (1199–1238), Icelandic chieftain active in the armed conflicts in Iceland during the Age of the Sturlungs
