= Helgerson =

Helgerson is a Swedish patronymic surname. Notable people with the surname include:

- Henry Helgerson (born 1952), American politician
- John L. Helgerson, American intelligence official

== See also ==
- Helgesen
