= The Hitman's Guide to Housecleaning =

Icelandic novel by Hallgrímur Helgasson

The Hitman's Guide to Housecleaning is a novel by Hallgrímur Helgason. His first novel to be composed in English, it was actually first published in Icelandic, in the author's own translation, as 10 ráð til að hætta að drepa fólk og byrja að vaska upp. It has also been translated into Dutch, German, Czech, Russian, Polish, Danish, and Italian.

== Plot ==
The novel takes place from May 15, 2006 to May 12, 2007. Tomislav Bokšić, nicknamed Toxic, after fighting on the Croatian side in the Croatian War of Independence, has moved to New York City and become a hitman for the Croatian mafia. His 66th victim is an undercover policeman and he has to flee the country. At the airport, he avoids detection by murdering a priest and takes his identity. Toxic uses the priest's boarding pass to Reykjavík.

Toxic is met by two small-time Icelandic televangelists, Guðmundur and his wife Sigríður. He passes for Reverend Friendly until the police come looking for him. He flees and seeks refuge with his hosts' daughter Gunnhildur, who dislikes her parents' religiosity and is pleased to harbour a criminal. Toxic hides in her attic, begins to reflect on his life of violence and the two begin a relationship.

Toxic discovers that his girlfriend in New York City, Munita, has been brutally murdered. He attempts to kill himself by throwing himself off a bridge. Surviving, he makes his way to Guðmundur and Sigríður's house, where he begs forgiveness and assistance. The two decide to take him in, wrap him in bandages, and get their friend Þorður, a preacher, to purge Toxic's soul through a programme of bodily mortification and spiritual reflection. Guðmundur uses his underworld and political connections to get Toxic an Icelandic identity as Tómas Leifur Ólafsson, a job, and a room in an illegal boarding-house for East European immigrant workers. Toxic's relationship with Gunnhildur develops. Discovering that some of his Lithuanian neighbours are gangsters, he steals a pistol owned by one and moves out to Gunnhildur's house. He settles into Icelandic life, keeping the pistol hidden in his shoe sole.

While watching the Eurovision Song Contest 2007 with Gunnhildur, her parents and their friends, Toxic (now Tómas) receives a visit from his old mafia colleagues Niko and Radovan. They drive him to the lava-fields of the Reykjanes Peninsula to kill him. Toxic disables them, leaves them alive, and drives back, injured, to the party. The novel ends with him falling through the front door, and discovering that Serbia has won.

The novel includes numerous flashbacks to Toxic's experiences in the Croatian War of Independence.

== Style and influences ==
The narration is first-person and for the most part present-tense. In the estimation of Larissa Kyzer,

Hallgrímur [...] has an almost playful approach to rhyme and description throughout the novel. Toxic refers to a contender for his girlfriend’s affections, an Italian mafioso, as “the Talian Mobthrob.” In another passage, he describes the late-setting sun: “At 10:33 the sun is still burning on the horizon like an orange lantern at an outdoor Chinese restaurant in Brooklyn.” The descriptions don’t always hit their mark—there are a few too many laboriously detailed passages about female anatomy, and sometimes the imagery borders on overwrought (“The Balkan animal, which is my soul, is always hungry for prey”), but overall, the prose and dialogue is fresh and expansive.

Toxic comments several times on the limitations of his English, which provides a framework for reading unidiomatic moments in the novel as mimetic of real life.

The author, Hallgrímur, has noted that in some ways Toxic repeats characteristics of Hlynur Björn, the protagonist of his earlier 101 Reykjavík, reflecting that the earlier book 'was written when Iceland was a more innocent place'. He also notes that the book reflects the rise of crime-writing in Iceland.

== Reception ==
The Hitman's Guide was a critical and commercial failure when published (in the author's translation) in Iceland in 2008. It was awarded "The Worst Title of the Year Prize" at local newspaper Fréttablaðið. Four years passed before the original found its way into print, when the novel was picked up by Amazon Crossing and published worldwide in 2012. It became a bestseller on amazon.com, peaking at no. 1 in Thrillers, only two weeks after publications, and has earned over 450 readers' reviews on the bookselling web, the highest score of any Icelandic book. Film rights were sold to Miso Film in Denmark, and pre-production is underway. A stage version of the book, done by Peter Arp, ran for a few weeks at the Schauspielhaus Salzburg, Austria, in the fall of 2011, and German movie star Uwe Ochsenknecht did his own stage version of it, that traveled around Germany.

Douglas Coupland, author of Generation X, characterised the work as "a sensational book. Hallgrimur Helgason's brain is like this amazing app that morphs the English language into gorgeously blunt new forms. It delivers surprise after surprise and makes you feel good about books again. I can't recommend it enough."

=== Reviews ===
- Árni Óskarsson: "Make love, not war", Tímarit Máls og menningar, 70.2 (2009), 123-26
- K[ormákur] B[ragason], 'Bókmenntaspjall', Stína, 4.1 (2009), 85-98
- Kyzer, Larissa, 'The Hitman's Guide to Housecleaning' [review], Three Percent: A Resource for International Literature at the University of Rochester, http://www.rochester.edu/College/translation/threepercent/index.php?id=3960.
