= Sauðafell Raid =

Event during the Age of the Sturlungs

The Sauðafell raid (Icelandic: Sauðafellsför or Sauðafellsferð) in January 1229 was one of the signal events in the increasing disorder that affected medieval Iceland during the period of violent struggle between rival elites known as the Age of the Sturlungs. Sturla Sighvatsson had supported the sons of Hrafn Sveinbjarnarson when they killed the rapacious chieftain Þorvaldr Snorrason of Vatnsfjörður at the burning of Gillastaðir in Króksfjörður in 1228. Þórðr and Snorri, Þorvaldr's sons, sought vengeance, and it was rumoured that it was Snorri Sturluson who encouraged them to direct their anger against Sturla, his own nephew, who was also his principal rival for power in the west of Iceland. During the winter after the burning of Þorvaldr the brothers rode by night to Sauðafell in the Dalir region, where Sturla lived, only to find that he was not at home. They broke into the farm and ransacked it, killing or wounding several of the inhabitants. After threatening Solveig Sæmundardóttir, Sturla's wife, in her bedchamber, they departed with all the booty they could carry. The account of the raid in Íslendinga saga indicates that it was considered a great scandal by many contemporary Icelanders, not least because of Snorri's involvement.

Sturla avenged himself on 8 March 1232, when he ambushed Þórðr and Snorri Þorvaldsson and had them both summarily executed. The episode brought an end to the power of the men of Vatnsfjörðr. Sturla and his uncle Snorri were reconciled for a while, but Snorri's reputation never fully recovered, and his power and influence in Iceland waned considerably in the following years.
