= Jón korpur Hrafnsson =

Jón korpur Hrafnsson (born 1255) (Anglicized John "the raven" son of Raven) son of Þuríður Sturludóttir (born 1228) and Hrafn Oddsson (born 1225). His mother, Þuríður, was a direct descendant of Þóra Magnúsdóttir daughter of Magnus III of Norway a direct descendant of Harald Fairhair (Haraldur hárfagri) founder of the Fairhair dynasty the first royal dynasty of the united Norway, and a branch of the Ynglings (also see Ynglinga saga). His father, Hrafn, on the other hand was a direct descendant of Skalla-Grímr father of skald and Viking Egill Skallagrímsson. With the birth of Jón korpur Hrafnsson the warring clans of the Fairhair dynasty and Skalla-Grímr were genetically united in Iceland.

== The blood line of Þuríður Sturludóttir to Haraldur hárfagri ==
Haraldur hárfagri Hálfdánarson (850) – King in Norway

Sigurður hrísi Haraldsson (880)

Hálfdán Sigurðsson (930)

Sigurður sýr Hálfdánarson (970)

Haraldur harðráði Sigurðsson (1047) – King in Norway

Ólafur kyrri Haraldsson (1066) – King in Norway

Magnús berfættur Ólafsson (1090) – King in Norway

Þóra Magnúsdóttir (1100)

Jón Loftsson (1124–1197)

Sæmundur Jónsson (1154–1222)

Sólveig Sæmundsdóttir (1200–1244)

Þuríður Sturludóttir (1228–1288)

The blood line of Hrafn Oddsson to Egill Skallagrimsson:

Kveldúlfur Brunda-Bjálfason (820)

Skallagrímur Kveldúlfsson (863)

Egill Skallagrímsson (910)

Þorgerður Egilsdóttir (935)

Þorbjörg “digra” Ólafsdóttir (960)

Kjartan Ásgeirsson (1000)

Þorvaldur Kjartansson (1055)

Ingiríður Þorvaldsdóttir (1110)

Vigdís Guðlaugsdóttir (1140)

Oddur Álason (1180–1234)

Hrafn Oddsson (1225–1289)

== Sources ==
- Islendingabók (Book of Icelanders): https://web.archive.org/web/20190210064149/https://www.islendingabok.is/
- Konungasögur (Kings' sagas)
- Egils saga Skallagrímssonar (Egils saga)
