= Nóregs konungatal =

10th century skaldic poem

Nóregs konungatal (Note: Alternatively Nóregs konunga-tal or Nóregs konunga tal. The same title is sometimes applied to Fagrskinna.) (List of Norwegian Kings) is an Icelandic skaldic poem. Composed around 1190, the poem is preserved in the 14th-century Flateyjarbók manuscript. It is based on the lost historical work of Sæmundr fróði and is the best extant testimony on the scope of Sæmundr's work. Consisting of 83 stanzas, the poem was composed for the influential Icelander Jón Loftsson and celebrates his descent from the Norwegian royal line. The poem is modelled after the earlier genealogical poems Háleygjatal and Ynglingatal, with which it shares the metre of kviðuháttr. It is thought to contain the central points of Sæmundr's lost work, especially its chronological information.
