= Jón Loftsson =

Icelandic chieftain (1124–1197)

- Born: c. 1124; Iceland
- Died: 1197 (aged 72–73); Iceland
- Occupation(s): Chieftain, politician

Jón Loftsson (Modern Icelandic: [ˈjouːn ˈlɔf(t)sɔn]; Old Norse: Jón Loptsson [ˈjoːn ˈloptsˌson]; c. 1124–1197) was chieftain of Oddi at Rangárvellir in the south part of Iceland.

Jón Loftsson was a member of the Oddaverjar family clan. His parents were Loftur Sæmundsson and Þóra Magnúsdóttir. His paternal grandfather was Sæmundur Sigfússon (Sæmundr fróði). His maternal grandfather was King Magnus III of Norway. He was educated at Konghelle (Kungahälla) in Bohuslän (Båhuslen) which at that time a royal center of the Kingdom of Norway. Jón Loftsson was married to Halldóra Brandsdatter with whom he had several children.

Jón Loftsson was one of the most popular chieftains and politician of his age in the country. The poem Nóregs konungatal was composed for Jón Loftsson and recounts his descent from the Norwegian royal line. At a young age, the great scholar Snorri Sturluson was fostered and educated by Jón Loftsson. In 1179, he participated and was victorious in the conflicts between bishops of the Diocese of Skálholt and secular rulers. Known as Staðarmál, the conflict dealt principally with control over Church lands. After Jón died the family at Oddi was still the most powerful family in Iceland but their power soon began to go downhill after his death.
