= Helgi Valdimarsson =

Icelandic immunologist (1936–2018)

Helgi Þröstur Valdimarsson (16 September 1936 – 6 August 2018) was an Icelandic physician and academic who was a professor of immunology at the University of Iceland. He established the first Immunology laboratory of Iceland in 1983. He was a senior lecturer at St Mary's Hospital Medical school, London, England, from 1975 to 1981 and a visiting professor at St. Mary's from 1981 to 1990. He published over 180 articles in international peer-reviewed journals, and for his work on psoriasis he received several research grants, including European Commission Grant (1998–2002) and a Fogarty Scholarship in 2003.

Valdimarsson died on 6 August 2018, at the age of 81. He was the father of Agnar Helgason and Asgeir R. Helgason, and English humorist Tim Moore was his son-in-law.

== Sources ==
- List of scientific articles on US National Library of Medicine National Institutes of Health
