= Cynic Guru =

Cynic Guru is a progressive rock band fronted by classically trained violinist Roland Hartwell.

== Early years: 1991-1996 ==
Cynic Guru started in Los Angeles as three-piece known as Where Is My Hair. This featured Roland Hartwell (guitar, vocals), Stefan Örn (bass), and Steef Van Oosterhout (drums).

In 1993, another phase of the band, SkotLaPop, was born. This incarnation of the band had Roland Hartwell (guitar, vocals, violin) and new members Marc Thomas (lead guitar), Chris Sampson (vocals, guitars), and Matt Matson (drums).

In 1996, the SkotLaPop became Cynic Guru. Chris Sampson left the band and was replaced by Mike Constantini (guitars, vocals) and Vince Varquez (bass).

== Midlife: 1996-2000 ==
Hartwell, a classically trained violin player, got offered a job touring with the Iceland Symphony Orchestra on the East Coast of the US sometime in the late 1990s. They liked him so much, that they eventually offered him a full-time position within the group. After enough commuting back and forth from Iceland, Hartwell decided to accept the offer, leaving Cynic Guru with him.

== Iceland: 2001–2006 ==
Ricky Korn and Einar Jóhannsson during the 2006 UK Tour

Soon Roland Hartwell reformed Cynic Guru in Reykjavik, Iceland, adding members Ricky Korn (bass), Einar Jóhannsson (lead guitar and backing vocs), Óli Hólm (drums), and John Mono (backing vocals and keyboards).

About three years later, Cynic Guru signed to SENA, the largest record label/entertainment group in Iceland. This paved the way for Iceland- Cynic Guru's debut album. Although many of the songs on Iceland had already been included in past EPs, most were either rearranged or rerecorded. After nearly a year in production, Iceland was released on September 26, 2005. The first single from Iceland, Drugs, made it to the number one spot on X-FM 97.7 in Reykjavík, beating out Queens of the Stone Age, Papa Roach, Green Day, Audioslave, The Transplants, Used/My Chemical Romance, and Nine Inch Nails.

Iceland spawned two other radio singles: Catastrophe, written about 9/11; and Digging the Holes. Videos were made for Drugs and Catastrophe, which were directed by Icelandic artist Bardi Johannsson, of Bang Gang.

2005 started off with a bit of a jolt. Cynic Guru was picked up by a British label, Fat Northerner Records, and a Japanese label, Westwood Records, for distribution, and Mono left the band.

Cynic Guru first toured the UK in June 2006.

== Iceland ==
Released September 26, 2005

1. DYFWIWTYWLF (Did You Find What It Was That You Were Looking For)
2. Catastrophe
3. Drugs
4. Death of a Guitarist
5. Digging the Holes
6. Ballistic
7. Ice Cream
8. Scab
9. Belly
10. Texas
11. Yellow Bag
12. V.P.
13. Dick

== "Drugs" ==
Released June 2006

1. Drugs
2. Dick
