= Gísli Pálsson =

Icelandic scholar (born 1949)

- Born: December 22, 1949 (age 76)
- Occupations: Anthropologist and academic

Academic background
- Education: BA., Social Science; MA., Social Anthropology; Ph.D., Social Anthropology
- Alma mater: University of Iceland; University of Manchester

Academic work
- Institutions: University of Iceland

Gísli Pálsson is an Icelandic anthropologist and academic. He is a Professor Emeritus of Anthropology at the University of Iceland, formerly a professor at the University of Oslo. He is the recipient of the Rosenstiel Award in Oceanographic Science from the University of Miami.

Pálsson is a Fellow of the Royal Anthropological Institute of Great Britain and Ireland and, formerly, Swedish Collegium for Advanced Study (SCAS).

== Education ==
Born on 22 December 1949, Pálsson grew up in the Westman Islands. He earned his bachelor's degree in Social Science from the University of Iceland in June 1972. He pursued his M.A. (Economics) in Social Anthropology at the University of Manchester in 1974, and obtained his Ph.D. in Social Anthropology from the same university in July 1982, under the supervision of Tim Ingold.

== Career ==
Pálsson began his career in 1974 as a Teacher at Hamrahlíð College in Iceland. He joined the University of Iceland as a part-time Lecturer in Anthropology in 1975, was appointed as a Lecturer in 1982, and served as a Senior Lecturer from 1987 to 1992. He then served as a Professor of Anthropology at the University of Iceland from 1992 to 2019, and held a concurrent appointment as Professor II in the Department of Anthropology at the University of Oslo. From 2008 to 2011, he served as an Associate Fellow at the Centre for Biomedicine & Society (CBAS) at King's College, London, and was an adjunct professor at the Rosenstiel School of Marine, Atmospheric, and Earth Science at the University of Miami from 2009 to 2012. He is now a professor emeritus in the Department of Anthropology at the University of Iceland.

Pálsson has held various administrative positions, including serving as Chair of the Department of Anthropology from 1996 to 1998 and from 2008 to 2009. He served as the Director of the Institute of Anthropology from 1998 to 2001.

Pálsson has conducted fieldwork in various locations, such as Iceland, northern Canada, the Cape Verde Islands, and the US Virgin Islands. He held an appointment as the Chair of a European Science Foundation (ESF) initiative entitled "Mapping Interfaces: The Future of Knowledge", from 2008 to 2010 and then served as the Vice-Chair for RESCUE (Responses to Environmental and Societal Challenges for our Unstable Earth) from 2009 to 2011.

He held visiting and research appointments at several institutions, including King's College London, where he was a visiting professor in social science, health and medicine from 2013 to 2016. He was a fellow at the Center for Advanced Study in Oslo in 2015–2016 and a research fellow at the University of Stavanger in March 2022. In spring 2023, he was a research fellow at the Swedish Collegium for Advanced Study in Uppsala. He has also held visiting professorships at the University of Vienna, the University of California, Los Angeles, the University of California, Berkeley, and the University of Iowa.

== Research ==
Pálsson's research centers on exploring environmental concerns within the context of environmental humanities, encompassing the analysis of human-environment interactions, social implications of climate change and biotechnology, investigations into fishing communities, and the history of the Inuit population. Furthermore, he has focused on the field of genomic anthropology, conducting research on Inuit populations in Nunavut and Greenland, as well as Icelandic groups.

=== Ethnography ===
In his early research, partly with E. Paul Durrenberger at Iowa, he explored the concepts of personal enskilment and success in Icelandic fishing, investigating how individuals actively engage with their environment and acquire skills beyond mere knowledge acquisition.

He has also investigated the complex relationship between humans and the environment in his book Nature, Culture, and Society: Anthropological Perspectives on Life and evaluated the limitations of a dualist paradigm in understanding environmental dynamics. In addition, he has looked into the migration history and population structure of Inuit populations in Greenland and Canada, with Agnar Helgason. By analyzing mtDNA control-region sequences, this research uncovered the prevalence of specific haplotypes within Inuit populations, which has significant implications for the understanding of ancestral origins. It further challenged the assumption of exclusive Thule ancestry in the Inuit and suggested a history of interactions and interbreeding with pre-existing Dorset populations.

Pálsson and Helgason explored the cross-cultural debates on the expansion of market relations in various aspects of social life, with a particular focus on commoditizing resource rights in Iceland. He has also studied the genetic, genealogical, and medical databases constructed for Iceland's population and their implications within the domestic context. Moreover, his research has examined the use of modern biotechnology and bioinformatics for commercial, medical, and scientific purposes, while further assessing the diverse responses and criticisms these developments have received, emphasizing the imperative of understanding moral debates and providing insights for informed public decision-making.

=== Environmental anthropology ===
Palsson's work in the field of environmental anthropology has explored geosocialities, revealing the intricate connections between planetary processes, volcanic activities, living organisms, species histories, and dissolved mineral compounds. His research has unveiled the vitality of non-life entities, as evidenced by the phenomena observed in Icelandic volcanoes. Moreover, his research has shed light on the topic of sustainability transitions, emphasizing the profound implications of the advent of the Anthropocene epoch. Recognizing the changing human condition in the context of global environmental change, he has highlighted the need for innovative approaches and adaptations in the humanities and social sciences.

=== Genomic anthropology ===
Pálsson's research has also focused on the field of genomic anthropology. In the domains of anthropology and personal genomics, he has evaluated the implications of services like deCODEme and 23andMe, emphasizing the collaboration between consumers and experts in shaping personal genomic information.

Together with Margaret Lock, Pálsson has also examined the ontological and epistemological shifts within the field of anthropology in the book titled Can Science Resolve the Nature/Nurture Debate. Having reviewed this book, Stefan Timmermans commented, "Lock and Pálsson expertly map ontological and epistemological shifts, and their exposé, if somewhat breezy, is thoughtful and insightful." He added that the co-authors "carry the mantle of cultural anthropology proudly, alerting readers that the social should matter".

Another aspect of the prominence of Pálsson's work is the depiction of slavery in race and culture. He analyzed the life of Hans Jonathan in The Man Who Stole Himself, which received the Vinson Sutlive Book Prize in Historical Anthropology administered by the College of William & Mary and was listed as one of the Times Literary Supplement Books of the Year in 2017.

His later research addresses extinction and the relationship between humans and other species. In The Last of Its Kind: The Search for the Great Auk and the Discovery of Extinction (2024), he examines the extinction of the great auk, a flightless seabird whose last known individuals were killed in Iceland in 1844.

== Awards and honors ==
- 1995 and 2023 – Research Fellow, Swedish Collegium for Advanced Study in the Social Sciences (SCASSS)
- 1997 – The Cultural Prize for research, Vátryggingafélag Íslands, Reykjavík
- 2006 – Honorary Fellow, Royal Anthropological Institute of Great Britain and Ireland
- 2014– Asa Wright Award for Research
- 2015–2016 – Fellow, Center for Advanced Study (CAS), Oslo
- 2017 – Times Literary Supplement Books of the Year, The Man Who Stole Himself
- 2018–Vinson Sutlive Book Prize in Historical Anthropology, College of William & Mary, for The Man Who Stole Himself.

== Bibliography ==
=== Selected books ===
- Coastal Economies, Cultural Accounts (1994) ISBN 9780719043864
- Images of Contemporary Iceland: Everyday Lives and Global Contexts (1995) (With E. Paul Durrenberger) (co-editor) ISBN 9780877455288
- Travelling Passions: The Hidden Life of Vilhjalmur Stefansson (2005) ISBN 9780887551796 English translation from the Icelandic (Frægð og firnindi). Translation by Keneva Kunz
- Nature and society: anthropological perspectives (2009) (With Philippe Descola) (co-editor) ISBN 9781134827169 Spanish translation, Naturaleza y socieda (2001) ISBN 9789682322983
- Biosocial Becomings: Integrating Social and Biological Anthropology (2013) (With Tim Ingold) (co-editor) ISBN 9781107025639
- Down To Earth (2020) ISBN 9781953035165 English translation from the Icelandic (Fjallið sem yppti öxlum). Translation by Anna Yates and Katrina Downs-Rose
- The Man Who Stole Himself (2016) Translation from the Icelandic (Maðurinn sem stal sjálfum sér) by Anna Yates. ISBN 9780226313283
- The Last of Its Kind: The Search for the Great Auk and the Discovery of Extinction (2024) ISBN 9780691230986

=== Selected articles ===
- Pálsson, Gísli (1994). "Enskilment at Sea". Man. 29 (4): 901–927. doi:10.2307/3033974. JSTOR 3033974.
- Helgason, Agnar; Palsson, Gisli (1997). "Contested Commodities: The Moral Landscape of Modernist Regimes". The Journal of the Royal Anthropological Institute. 3 (3): 451–471. doi:10.2307/3034762. JSTOR 3034762.
- Pálsson, G., & Rabinow, P. (1999). Iceland: the case of a national human genome project. Anthropology today, 15(5), 14–18.
- Pálsson, Gísli; HarÐardóttir, Kristín E. (April 2002). "For Whom the Cell Tolls: Debates about Biomedicine". Current Anthropology. 43 (2): 271–301. doi:10.1086/338302.
- Pálsson, Gísli (August 2008). "Genomic Anthropology: Coming In from the Cold?". Current Anthropology. 49 (4): 545–568. doi:10.1086/529545. PMID 19230264.
- Pálsson, G. (2009). Biosocial relations of production. Comparative Studies in Society and History, 51(2), 288–313.
- Pálsson, G., Szerszynski, B., Sörlin, S., Marks, J., Avril, B., Crumley, C., ... & Weehuizen, R. (2013). Reconceptualizing the 'Anthropos' in the Anthropocene: integrating the social sciences and humanities in global environmental change research. *Environmental Science & Policy, 28, 3–13
- Pálsson, G., & Swanson, H. A. (2016). Down to earth: geosocialities and geopolitics. Environmental Humanities, 8(2), 149–171.
- Abel, S., Tyson, G. F., & Pálsson, G. (2019). From enslavement to emancipation: naming practices in the Danish West Indies. Comparative Studies in Society and History, 61(2), 332–365.
- Lien, M. E., & Pálsson, G. (2021). Ethnography beyond the human: the 'other-than-human'in ethnographic work. Ethnos, 86(1), 1–20.
