= Solveig Sæmundardóttir =

Icelandic heiress (d. 1254)

Solveig Sæmundardóttir (d. 1254) was an Icelandic heiress whose wealth made her a significant player in Iceland’s Age of the Sturlungs. Pursued in marriage by both Snorri Sturluson and his nephew and political rival Sturla Sighvatsson, she became head of the household at Sturla’s farm Sauðafell, which put her in danger in the Sauðafell Raid. She is known from Sturlunga saga.

== Life ==
=== Early life and marriage ===
Solveig was the daughter of the chieftain Sæmundr Jónsson and one of his mistresses, Valgerð. Sæmundr stipulated that Solveig should have as much inheritance as her brothers. She and her mother sought help to enforce this decision, and Snorri Sturluson was called in to arbitrate. Snorri enjoyed conversing with Solveig and ruled that she should have her choice of inheritance. He hoped to marry her, but the next spring she was married to Snorri’s nephew Sturla Sighvatsson, to Snorri’s displeasure. The marriage was arranged by Sturla's parents, who removed Sturla's existing concubine to a different household. Solveig brought her inherited wealth to the match but little political support, as her brothers were attached by marriage to the families of Sturla's enemies. Solveig became the mistress of the household at Sauðafell, but she felt that she had little knowledge of her husband's business. They had two daughters and a son.

=== Sauðafell Raid ===
Solveig's most dramatic scene in Sturlunga saga is the Sauðafell Raid, where Sturla’s opponents broke into Sturla’s house and threatened Solveig by showing her their bloodied weapons, saying that they were intended for her husband. Sturla was away from home at the time, but Solveig, who had just had a baby, was there with her mother and her daughter. One of the attackers wanted Solveig to come away with him, but she did not go. Solveig urged that the attackers be pursued, but was overruled by her mother.

=== Later life ===
After Sturla was killed in the Battle of Örlygsstaðir in about 1238, Solveig took her daughters to Norway to follow her son, Jón, who had gone to Norway the previous year. She handed over Sauðafell, and possibly her late husband's share in the family goðorð, to Snorri, who gave it to his nephew Sturla Þorðarson. The family had returned to Iceland by 1240. Solveig died in 1254.
