= Auður Eir Vilhjálmsdóttir =

Icelandic protestant cleric

Auður Eir Vilhjálmsdóttir (born 21 April 1937) is an Icelandic Protestant cleric. On 29 September 1974, she became the first woman to be ordained as a minister of the Evangelical Lutheran Church of Iceland. She took up her first post as a pastor in the little village of Suðureyri on 1 October. Auður is married to Þórði Erni Sigurðssyn and has four daughters, two of whom are priests.

Auður first completed a course at the commercial college of Iceland in June 1956. She went on to study theology at the University of Iceland, graduating as a Cand.theol. in 1962. She was ordained as a parish priest on 29 September 1974.

The ordination followed a long history of women theologians in Iceland. In 1945, the first woman graduated as Cand.theol. at the University of Iceland but was never ordained. Auður Eir Vilhjálmsdóttir graduated in 1962 but was not ordained until 1974. She had had to campaign for support from a church community before she could be chosen as a pastor by a congregation. In the autumn of 1974, she succeeded in receiving the support of a small fishing village. After consulting members of the Church Council and the committee of the pastors' association, Bishop Sigurbjörn Einarsson decided to go ahead with the ordination on 29 September 1974. He subsequently justified his decision on the grounds that there were no theological reasons again ordination and no real threat of a split within Iceland's Church.
