= White Amazonian Indians =

Sightings or encounters with mysterious natives of the Amazon rainforest

White Amazonian Indians or White Indians is a term first applied to sightings or encounters with mysterious white skinned natives of the Amazon rainforest from the 16th century by Spanish missionaries. These encounters and tales sparked Percy Fawcett's journey into the uncharted jungle of the Amazonian Mato Grosso region. Various theories since the early 20th century have been proposed regarding the documented sightings or encounters.

== History ==
The Spanish Dominican missionary Gaspar de Carvajal first claimed meeting a white tribe of Amazonians, he wrote in his Account of the Recent Discovery of the Famous Grand River (1542) of a tribe of Amazonian women who were "very white and tall" who had "long hair, braided and wound about their heads". British Journalist Harold T. Wilkins in his Mysteries of Ancient South America (1945) compiled further accounts of similar sightings of "White Indians" in the Amazon Rainforest from the 16th to 19th century by explorers and Jesuits.

Percy Fawcett in the 1920s searched for the Lost City of Z in the Amazon which he believed was inhabited by a race of "White Indians".

Alexander Hamilton Rice's 1924-1925 expedition into the unmapped Amazonian regions adjacent to the Parima River was publicized in The New York Times in July 1925. The article contains the following physical description of the "White Indians":

Then two Indians who were bleached white by the sun, but of pure Indian blood, came out from the forest to greet the party. Dr. Rice described them as being undersized and undernourished. Their faces were streaked with pigments so that it was difficult to discern the features, but they were undeniably white. They wore no clothing, and carried bows and arrows which were tipped with poison, so the Indians in the expedition said. When the two received presents of beads and handkerchiefs they yelled to their companions and others soon emerged and joined the group, making in all twenty men and two women.

== Parakanã Indians ==
One group of Indians who may be the source of some of these tales are the Brazilian Parakanã. Although some are light skinned, "Parakanã have skin colors that are not much different from those of other Amerindian groups.". Another journal article states "there is no evidence of miscegenation with Caucasians".

== Aché Indians ==
The Aché (/ɑːˈtʃeɪ/ ah-CHAY) Indians are a traditional hunter-gatherer tribe living in Paraguay. They are called "Guayakí" by Guarani speaking neighbors and in early anthropological accounts. Early descriptions of the Aché emphasized their white skin, light eye and hair color, heavy beards, Asiatic features, and practice of cannibalism as identifying characteristics. Some writers have suggested that they are the descendants of Norsemen or shipwrecked European sailors, although neighboring groups have said that they look Japanese, not European. A 1996 study reported that "recent genetic studies have in fact concluded that the Aché are physically and genetically dissimilar to most other South American Indians studied but they show no evidence of any European or African admixture."

== Guna of Panama ==
Guna children in 1927. The child in the center is albino.

The Guna people of Panama and Colombia have a high incidence rate of albinism, which led Westerners to nickname them "white Indians" in the early 1900s.

== See also ==
- Great Ireland
- Blonde Eskimo
