= Reynir Böðvarsson =

Icelandic seismologist

Reynir Böðvarsson is an Icelandic seismologist working at Uppsala University in Sweden. He is responsible for the Swedish National Seismology Network.

== External ==
- Seismology Institute Uppsala University
- Swedish National Seismology Net Homepage
