= Ásgeir Helgason =

Icelandic scientist (born 1957)

Ásgeir R. Helgason (born 1957) is an Icelandic scientist working at Karolinska Institutet in Sweden. Since 2002 he has been an associate professor in psychology at the Departments of Oncology-Pathology and Public Health at the Karolinska Institutet and Reykjavik University, Iceland.

Ásgeir is best known for his population based research on sexual function and emotional isolation in elderly men and prostate cancer patients, patient trade-off and his work on smoking cessation and quitlines. Helgason was a prime mover in the establishment of the Swedish and Icelandic national quitlines for smoking cessation (1998) and responsible for their development. He was also engaged in the development of a similar telephone-based proactive treatment for people who seek help for controlling their alcohol consumption (alcohol quitline).

Other work includes research on motivational interviewing and palliative care, followed by an ethical analysis of facilitating death talk in end-of-life care.

Ásgeir has two sons. His father was scientist Helgi Valdimarsson, and he is a brother of scientist Agnar Helgason and a brother-in-law of writer Tim Moore.
