= Quitline =

Addiction helpline

Quitlines are telephone helplines offering treatment for addiction and behavior change/issues. Presently most quitlines treat tobacco or alcohol addiction. Quitlines are treatment centres that offer advanced treatment and should not be confused with call centres.

== Smoking cessation quitlines ==
Tobacco quitlines have proven to be comparable to cessation clinics in terms of proportion of smokers smoke-free at follow-up but are more cost effective. A 2008 meta-analysis by the Agency for Healthcare Research and Quality, an agency of the U.S. Department of Health & Human Services, found that quitline counseling increased the estimated long-run (>6 months) abstinence rate to 12.7% compared to 8.5% of smokers attempting to quit on their own; when combined with medication, the estimated long-run abstinence rate increased to 28.1% compared to 23.2% for just medication alone, a "robust effect".

The treatment protocol in most tobacco cessation quitlines is a mixture of motivational interviewing, behaviour therapy, and pharmacological consultation. Quitline numbers are printed on cigarette packages in several countries as a part of the health warning labels. Tobacco quitlines may offer a reactive service, meaning that counselors initiate no contact but clients signing up for support are encouraged to call the service whenever they need, or a proactive service where clients signing up for treatment are offered a call up service. Many quitlines offer both reactive and proactive treatments and leave it up to the client to choose.

== Alcohol quitlines ==
Telephone based advice (call centres) for alcoholics and their relatives are relatively common and some are gradually developing into telephone based treatment centres. However, alcohol quitlines are still in their infancy. In Sweden where telephone-based treatment for tobacco addiction is well established, an advanced alcohol treatment quitline (first of its kind) opened in January 2007. The service is run in close collaboration with the Swedish national tobacco quitline. The primary aim of the Swedish alcohol quitline is to support people who are starting to lose control over their alcohol consumption to regain control. The treatment protocol is based on motivational interviewing and cognitive behavioral therapy offering support to excessive consumers of alcohol and relatives alike.
