= Marga Ingeborg Thome =

Icelandic academic

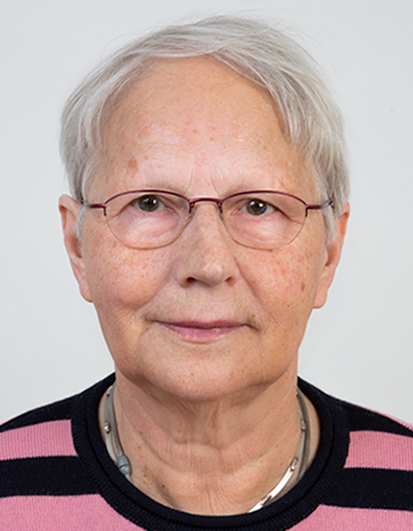
- Born: 17 July 1942 (age 83)
- Occupation: professor emerita at the University of Iceland

Marga Ingeborg Thome (born 17 July 1942) is a German-Icelandic nursing scholar. She is a professor emerita at the University of Iceland. In 2010, Marga was awarded the Knight's Cross of the Icelandic Order of the Falcon.

== Biography ==
Marga Ingeborg Thome was born in Oberlöstern, Wadern, Germany, on 17 July 1942. She completed A-levels with the Ketteler Kolleg, Mainz, Germany, finished nursing school in 1963 at the Universitätskliniken Homburg, Saar, Germany, and midwifery school in 1965 at the Kantonales Frauenspital, Bern, Switzerland. She completed studies as a teacher in nursing in 1973 in Heidelberg, Germany, a Diploma of Advanced Nursing Studies and a master's degree in 1977 from Victoria University in Manchester, England and acquired a doctoral degree (PhD) from Queen Margaret University and Open University in Edinburgh, Scotland, in 1997. She is a citizen of Germany and Iceland and has resided in Iceland since 1973.

Marga was a part-time teacher in nursing with the University of Iceland from 1974–1975. In 1977, she received the first chair in nursing as an Assistant Professor with the Department of Nursing. In 1980, she was promoted to Associate Professor and in 2006 to full professorship until her retirement in 2012. She was amongst those developing the curriculum in nursing into a bachelor of science degree and later also helped develop curriculums for masters and doctoral degrees and midwifery studies.

Marga taught both nursing and midwifery at basic and advanced levels. She participated in international collaborations with universities and research institutes in Germany and Austria. She contributed to international scholarly societies aiming to develop knowledge related to mental health during the childbearing period and the first years of life (Marcé Society and Society of Reproductive and Infant Psychology). From 1997–2000, Marga was the first chairperson at the Nursing Research Institute at the University of Iceland, and the first Dean of the Faculty of Nursing from 2000–2003. She worked as a nurse and midwife in Germany, Switzerland, and Iceland before teaching at the University of Iceland. The Ministry of Education, Science and Culture appointed her to the Nursing Council. Located in the Ministry of Health, the council grants licences to nurses. The Icelandic Nursing Association appointed her as Iceland's representative to the Workgroup of European Nurse Researchers (WERN) from 2000–2007.

== Expertise and research ==
Marga specialised in maternal and new-born nursing, with focus on mental health. She held a joint position as an academic chair in the field of her expertise with the Landspitali – a National University Hospital (LSH) and with the Primary Health Care Centers in Greater Reykjavik from 2000–2012, which facilitated co-operative research with practicing nurses and other health professionals. Her research related to Icelandic mothers’ breastfeeding, postpartum mental health, and sleep problems of babies. In co-operation with other specialists, and with masters and doctoral students, she participated in mapping Icelandic women's perinatal mental health, studied how online education for primary care nurses on postpartum mental distress affected rehabilitation of long-term depressed patients, and the effect of a psycho-social intervention on distressed female university students. In addition, she studied the effect of family-nursing intervention on expecting couples when the mother is distressed, ways to screen for antenatal distress and illness, and how social support and pregnant women's satisfaction with the couple relationship affect pregnancy. Marga published her research and scholarly work in Icelandic, English and German in national and international journals. She has held numerous lectures on these topics at national and international conferences and workshops.

== Honours ==
- 2007 saw the 30-year commemoration of the first Icelandic nurses graduating with BS degrees from the University of Iceland. At the event, Marga was honoured as one of the pioneers of this event.
- On 17 June 2010, she received the Knight's Cross of the Icelandic Order of the Falcon (riddarakrossi hinnar íslensku fálkaorðu), the Icelandic State's highest honour, for her contribution to health science and research.
- In June 2019, the Icelandic Nurses Association elected her an honorary fellow for her contribution to education, research and development of knowledge.

== Scholarly writings ==
- Kristín Björnsdóttir og Marga Thome, (2006). Sérfræðingar í hjúkrun: Skilgreining, viðurkenning og nám. Tímarit hjúkrunarfræðinga, 1(1), 28–36.
- Thome, M., Skuladottir, A. (2005). Changes in sleep problems, parents distress and impact of sleep problems from infancy to preschool age for referred and unreferred children. Scandinavian Journal of Caring Science, 19, 86–94.
- Marga Thome, Brynja Orlygsdottir, og Bjarki Thor Elvarsson. (2012). Evaluation of the clinical effect of an on-line course for community nurses on post-partum emotional distress: a community-based longitudinal time-series quasi-experiment. Scandinavian Journal of Caring Sciences, 26(3): 494–504.
- Linda B. Lydsdottir, Louise M. Howard, Halldora Olafsdottir, Marga Thome, Sigurdsson, J.F. (2014). The mental health characteristics of pregnant women with depressive symptoms identified by the Edinburgh Postnatal Depression Scale. J Clin Psychiatry (754):393–398.
- Linda B Lydsdottir, Louise M Howard, Halldora Olafsdottir, Marga Thome, Petur Tyrfingsson og J.F. Sigurdsson. (2019). The psychometric properties of the Icelandic version of the Edinburgh Postnatal Depression Scale (EPDS) when used prenatal. Midwifery, 69, 45–51.
- Sigríður Sía Jónsdóttir, Katarina Swahnberg, Marga Thome, Guðmundur Kristjan Oskarsson, Linda Bara Lyðsdóttir, Halldora Ólafsdottir, Jon Friðrik Sigurdsson, Thora Steingrimsdottir. (2019). Pain management and medical interventions during childbirth among perinatal distressed women and women dissatisfied in their partner relationship: A prospective cohort study. Midwifery, 69, 1–9.
- Sigríður Sía Jónsdóttir, Katarina Swahnberg, Marga Thome, Guðmundur Kristjan Oskarsson, Linda Bara Lyðsdóttir, Halldora Ólafsdottir, Jon Friðrik Sigurdsson, Thora Steingrimsdottir. (2019). Pregnancy complications, sick leave and service needs of women who experience perinatal distress, weak social support and dissatisfaction in their partner relationships. Scandinavian Journal of Caring Sciences. June 2019, 1-14.
