= Margrét Hermanns-Auðardóttir =

Icelandic archaeologist

Margrét Hermanns-Auðardóttir is an Icelandic archaeologist best known for her PhD thesis presenting the provocative theory that Iceland may have been settled by Scandinavians (probably Christian refugees from pagan Norway) long before the official date of 874. This theory is based on her own archaeological excavation in Herjólfsdalur in the Vestmannaeyjar south of Iceland.
