= Helgesen =

Helgesen is a surname. Notable people with the surname include:

- Finn Helgesen (born 1919) Norwegian speed skater
- Poul Helgesen (c.1480 – c.1534) Danish Carmelite
- Henry Thomas Helgesen (1857–1917) U.S. Representative from North Dakota
- Sverre Helgesen (1903–1981) Norwegian high jumper
- Hermann Helgesen (1889–1963) Norwegian gymnast
- Hans Lars Helgesen (1831–1918)
- George Helgesen Fitch (1877–1915) American author
- Gunn Marit Helgesen (born 1958) Norwegian politician

== See also ==
- Helgerson
