= Halldóra Bjarnadóttir =

Icelandic teacher, politician, author (1873–1981)

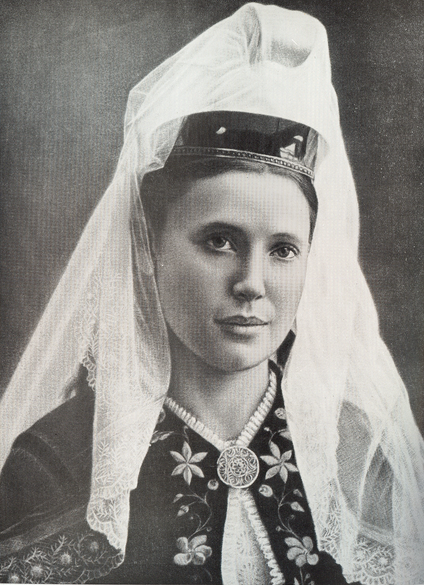
- (1897)
- Born: 14 October 1873; Vatnsdalur, Iceland
- Died: 27 November 1981 (aged 108); Blönduós, Iceland
- Burial place: Akureyri, Iceland
- Occupations: Teacher, politician and author
- Known for: Order of the Falcon

Halldóra Bjarnadóttir (1873–1981) was an Icelandic educator, politician and author who promoted the domestic textile industry and textile handicrafts. She received her country's chivalric award, the Order of the Falcon. She lived to 108 becoming the oldest woman in Iceland at that time.

== Biography ==
Halldóra Bjarnadóttir was born on 14 October 1873 into the farming family of Björg Jónsdóttir and Bjargar Jónasson in Vatnsdalur, Iceland. Her mother's foster brother and close cousin was the author and folklore collector Jón Árnason. When Halldóra was ten years old, her parents divorced. Her father emigrated to the United States and Halldóra and her mother moved to Reykjavík. She became a private teacher at the age of 17, and also gave handicraft courses at her home. At that time, there was no school for teachers in Iceland so, in 1896, she went to Oslo, Norway to train as a teacher with financial support from her father and a friend.

=== Educator ===
After graduation, she returned to Reykjavík to work as a teacher for one year in 1899 and also taught religion and geography at a school for women. When she requested a salary increase to match that of other educated colleagues, it was denied so she returned to Norway in 1900 with her mother to teach there. Her mother remained with her for the rest of her life.

Iceland introduced compulsory education in 1907 for children aged 10 to 14, so Halldóra successfully applied for a position in northern Iceland as headmistress of a school in Akureyri, and became one of the first women to teach. She placed great emphasis on general education, drawing and needlework lessons for both boys and girls, as well as moral education; games and singing. She had a playground built at the school, set up a school library, and a workshop for knitting and sewing. The Christian faith played a central role in the lessons. An estimated 500 girls and women also attended her needlework courses during this time. She was the first educator in Iceland to hold teacher-parent meetings.

Her unusual way of running the school was often criticized, forcing Halldóra to quit as school administrator during the winter of 1918 but she lived in Akureyri until the autumn of 1922. She continued giving courses in sewing and weaving.

=== Politician ===
She was first on the women's list in the municipal elections in 1910 and 1921, and third on the women's list in the Althing elections in 1922 and 1926. She sat on the Akureyri city council and on the school board. In 1913 she was one of the founders of the Association for the Domestic Industry of Iceland, and in 1914 she initiated the establishment of an association for women in the north of the country. Halldóra was elected the first chairman of this association and remained so for a decade.

In 1922, Halldóra moved back to Reykjavík and became a part-time teacher in handicrafts at the Teachers' College in 1922–1930 and in the following years until 1957 she was a consultant to the domestic industry on behalf of Althing and the Búnaðarfélag (Farmers' Association). She gave seminars, organized exhibitions and competitions. For the exhibitions, she traveled to other Scandinavian countries as well as to the United States and Great Britain.

=== Author ===
In 1917, she founded the women's magazine Hlín (named after a Norse female deity), which she published for the next 44 years until publication ceased. Hlín was very popular and about 6.000 copies were published. In 1940 she moved back to the north of Iceland, bought a small farm, Móland in Glerárþorp, and in 1946 founded a handicraft school in Svalbarð near Eyjafjörður. She also wrote children's books, weaving books and embroidery.

In 1931, Halldóra received her country's chivalric award the Order of the Falcon, was an honorary member of the Farmers' Association and numerous other associations, some of which she had founded herself. In 1954, she sold her farm Móland and moved to a retirement home in Blönduós, but continued to keep in touch with many people by letter. On her 105th birthday, she gave this advice: "Read good books, talk to good people."

She donated her collection of handicraft accessories and weaving and knitting patterns to the Heimilisiðnaðarsafnið textile museum in Blönduós, where her pieces are on display in the Halldórustofa room. She gave other memorabilia and costumes to the Farmers' Association. Her legacy also included numerous books and her original writings.

=== Later years ===
Halldóra Bjarnadóttir, who remained unmarried, died 27 November 1981 at 108, the oldest woman in Iceland at the time, and was buried 5 December 1981 in Akureyri. In 1996, the Icelandic Post Office issued a stamp in her honor.
