= Ampop =

Icelandic band

- Origin: Reykjavík, Iceland
- Genres: Dream pop, downtempo, indie pop, indie rock, alternative rock
- Years active: 1998–present
- Labels: TMT, Dennis, Sena
- Members: Birgir Hilmarsson; Kjartan F. Ólafsson; Jón Geir Jóhansson

Ampop is an Icelandic melodic-pop/rock band from Reykjavík, Iceland. Founded in 1998 by Kjartan F. Olafsson and Biggi Hilmarsson, the name of the band is actually the name of the first song they ever wrote, and is made from the words ambient and pop, which they thought was the definition of the music they were making at that time.

== Members ==
The band was originally a duo, but before making their third album they added a drummer to the band. The band consists of three members:

- Biggi Hilmarsson: Guitar, vocals
- Kjartan F. Olafsson: keyboards
- Jón Geir Jóhansson: drums

== History ==
Ampop released two electronic based albums in their homeland, Nature Is Not A Virgin and Made for Market. The band recorded in their own studio and over time developed a more organic and song based direction moving away from the more electronic influences of their earlier material. The first examples of the band’s new direction were demo versions of two songs, “My Delusions” and “Don’t let me down” in 2005. These tracks were picked up on by Radio 1’s; Zane Lowe who invited the band to play live on his show from Austin, Texas, during this year’s SXSW music festival. AMPOP played alongside The Bravery, Hot Hot Heat, The Blood Arm and Queens of the Stone Age as the only unsigned band. After their appearance at SXSW, the band went back to their studio to finish the album, stopping to play in NY and the NXNE festival in Toronto. The first single off the new album, “My delusions”, had a UK release via Relentless Records imprint Stimulus Records, who spotted the band live in Austin. In 2007, AMPOP went on hiatus.

== Post Ampop ==
In 2008, frontman Biggi Hilmarsson created and launched his new concept "Blindfold" in the UK, composed of four young Alternative Indie Rockers with their 'Cinematic Indie-Rock'. In 2009, they released the album "Blindfold". 'Faking Dreams' was made with management by JC Caddy.

In 2011, Kjartan Olafsson released his eponymous solo debut as Kjarr. He has also worked on other projects, taking on the keyboard duties with Icelandic rockers, "Leaves" in 2009. He also does vocals on the album "Love in times of repetition" by Icelandic electronica duo Asonat (2012).

Jón Geir Jóhansson plays drums with a number of acts, the most notable being Icelandic Viking Metal band, Skálmöld.

== Discography ==
=== Studio albums ===
- Sail to the moon (2006)
- My Delusions (2005)
- Made For Market (2002)
- Nature Is Not A Virgin (2000)

=== Singles ===
- Gets me Down (2006)
- My Delusions / Youth (2005)
- Made For Market (2002)
