= Halldor Mar =

Icelandic songwriter and guitarist

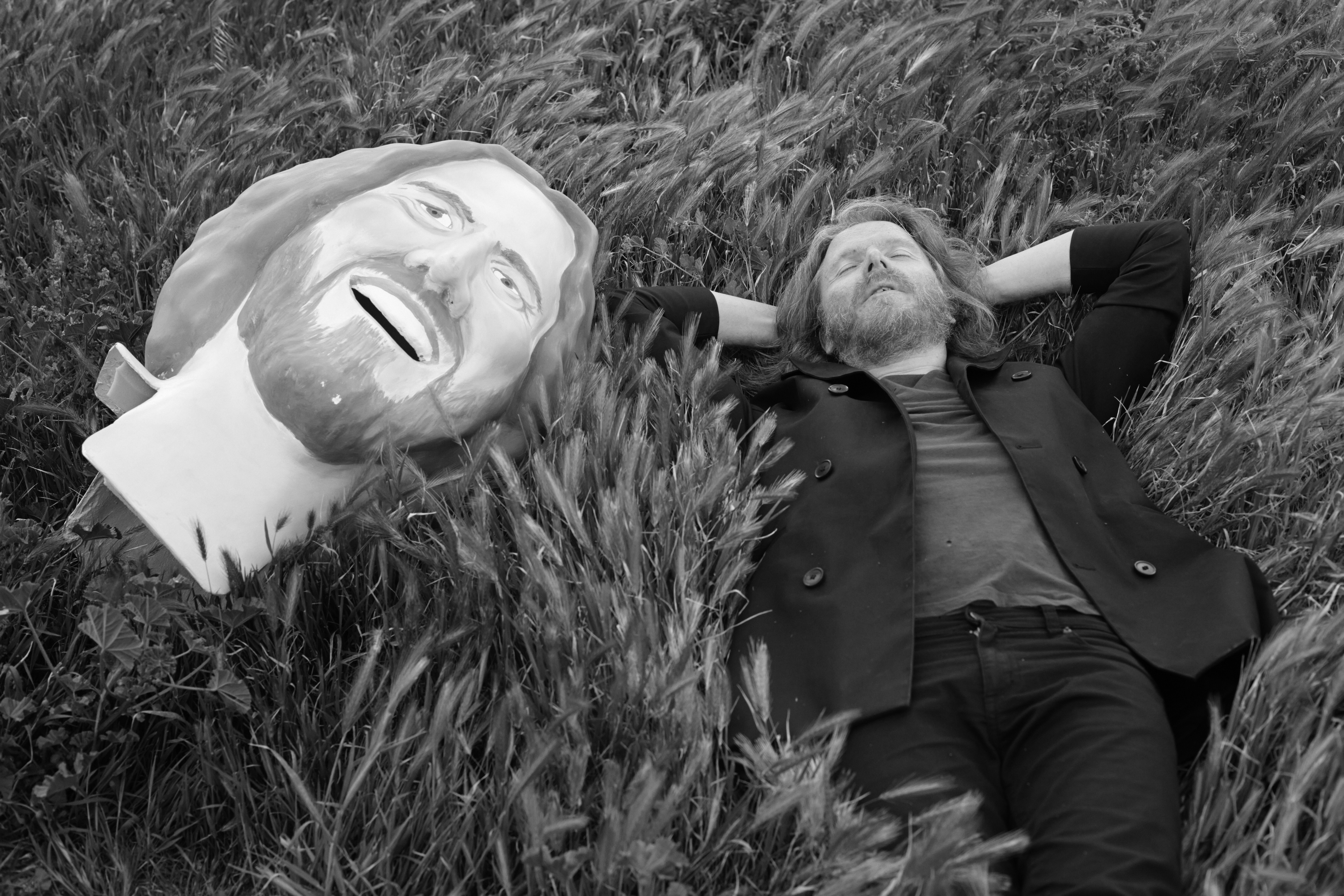

Background information
- Birth name: Halldór Stefánsson Már
- Genres: Songwriter
- Instrument(s): Singing, guitar
- Website: www.darumarecords.net

Halldor Mar is an Icelandic songwriter and guitarist. His music is based on acoustic folk music and alternative rock. He is also a member of the composing pop rock group Wiggum.

== Biography ==
Halldór Stefánsson Már was born in Reykjavík, Iceland. He has been a musician since early childhood. His mother encouraged him to adopt the drums or the piano, but he fell in love with the guitar. He has played it in all its forms, but mainly classical.

He began his guitar studies with Professor Vidar Örn Erlendsson at the conservatory in Akureyri. In 1993 he moved to Barcelona to study guitar at the Escola de Música Luthier (Luthier School of Music) with Alex Arnaldur Arnarson Garrobé. He has participated in international courses with teachers like David Russell, Hopkinson Smith, Manuel Barrueco and José Tomás Pérez Sellés. Later Halldor Mar crossed Iceland and Spain, both as a soloist and as a member of "Mosaic Barcelona's Guitar Quartet".

In 2004 he collaborated on the album With Hands. He worked with guitarist and composer Eduard Rodes to perform a piece called "The Light", inspired by the life of Francesc Ferrer i Guàrdia, who was a free-thinker executed in 1909, following the Tragic Week riots in Barcelona. The piece was presented to the public on October 13, 2003, the anniversary of Ferrer Guardia's execution, on the premises of the Foundation Ferrer i Guardia in Barcelona. Halldor Mar returned to work on Eduard Rodes 2006 album República Mediterránea, interpreting the theme in "In Iskandariyah".

With the passage of time he began to create his own music, presenting concerts in small Irish pubs, years after participating in Barcelona nightlife.

After years of alternative pop rock and singing-songwriting, he began recording. In 2009 published his first solo album, Simple, under the label Daruma Records. The album was recorded in the studio with the help of the producer Marc Molas. And as the name suggests, is a simple disc: varied, intense, and elaborate, yet simple. The album was released on the market in November of the same year.

Halldor Mar is also a member of the group Wiggum. Wiggum was formed in 2009. In February 2010 they released their debut album Sinton Nison loves Nifú Nifá. The studio album was recorded with the Maltese Pierce Salvador as the producer. It received good reviews from music media such as the magazines MundoSonoro, Binaural, and Planeta Indie.

In 2014. Halldor Mar published the album The Wind. It contains versions in English of ten songs from the Catalan Nova Cançó movement. Tracks include "Little Country" by Lluis Llach and "The Wind" by Raimon.
