= Kristleifur Björnsson =

Icelandic artist

- Born: 1973 (age 52–53); Reykjavík, Iceland
- Education: Academy of Visual Arts Leipzig
- Known for: Artist, photography, collage, drawing, film

Kristleifur Björnsson is an Icelandic visual artist born in Reykjavík, Iceland in 1973. He graduated from HGB – Academy of Visual Arts in Leipzig, (Germany) in 2003.

Kristleifur's work has been exhibited in solo and group exhibitions throughout Europe in art museums and galleries such as Berlinische Galerie in Berlin, The Reykjavík Art Museum and The Tate Modern in London. He lives and works in Berlin, Germany.
