= Snorri Sturluson =

Icelandic historian, poet and politician (1179–1241)

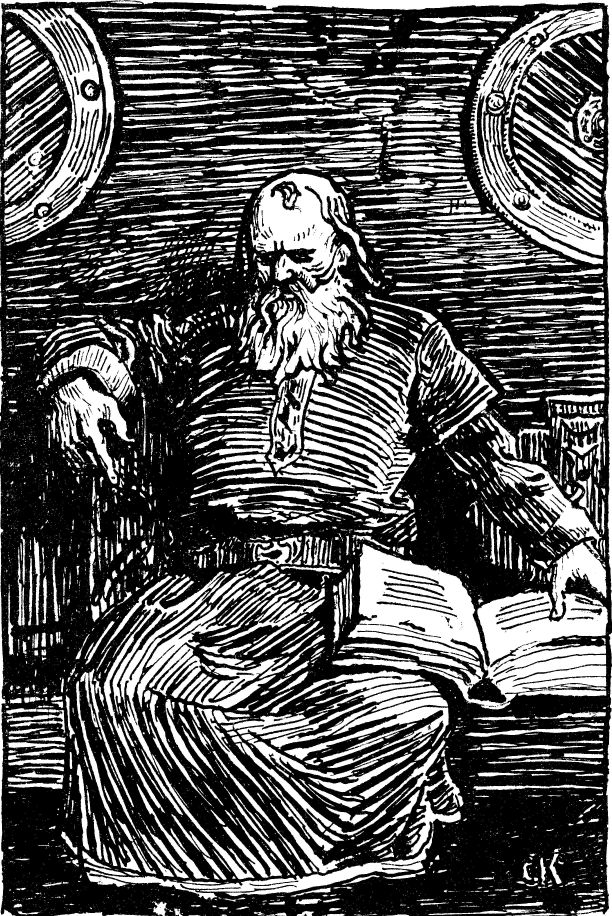
- Snorri Sturluson by Christian Krohg (1890s)
- Born: 1179; Hvammur í Dölum, Dalasýsla, Icelandic Commonwealth
- Died: 23 September 1241 (aged 61–62); Reykholt, Iceland
- Occupations: Lawspeaker, author, poet, historian, politician, knight, skutilsvein
- Era: Age of Sturlungs
- Organization: Althing
- Notable work: Prose Edda, Heimskringla
- Spouse: Herdís Bersadóttir (m. 1199; estranged 1206)
- Partners: Hallveig Ormsdóttir (1224–1241); Guðrún Hreinsdóttir; Oddny; Þuríður Hallsdóttir
- Children: ~6
- Parents: Sturla Þórðarson; Guðný Böðvarsdóttir
- Relatives: Sighvatr Sturluson (brother); Steinvör Sighvatsdóttir (niece); Þórður kakali Sighvatsson (nephew); Sturla Sighvatsson (nephew); Óláfr Þórðarson (nephew); Sturla Þórðarson (nephew); Kolbeinn ungi Arnórsson (son-in-law)
- Family: Sturlungar family clan

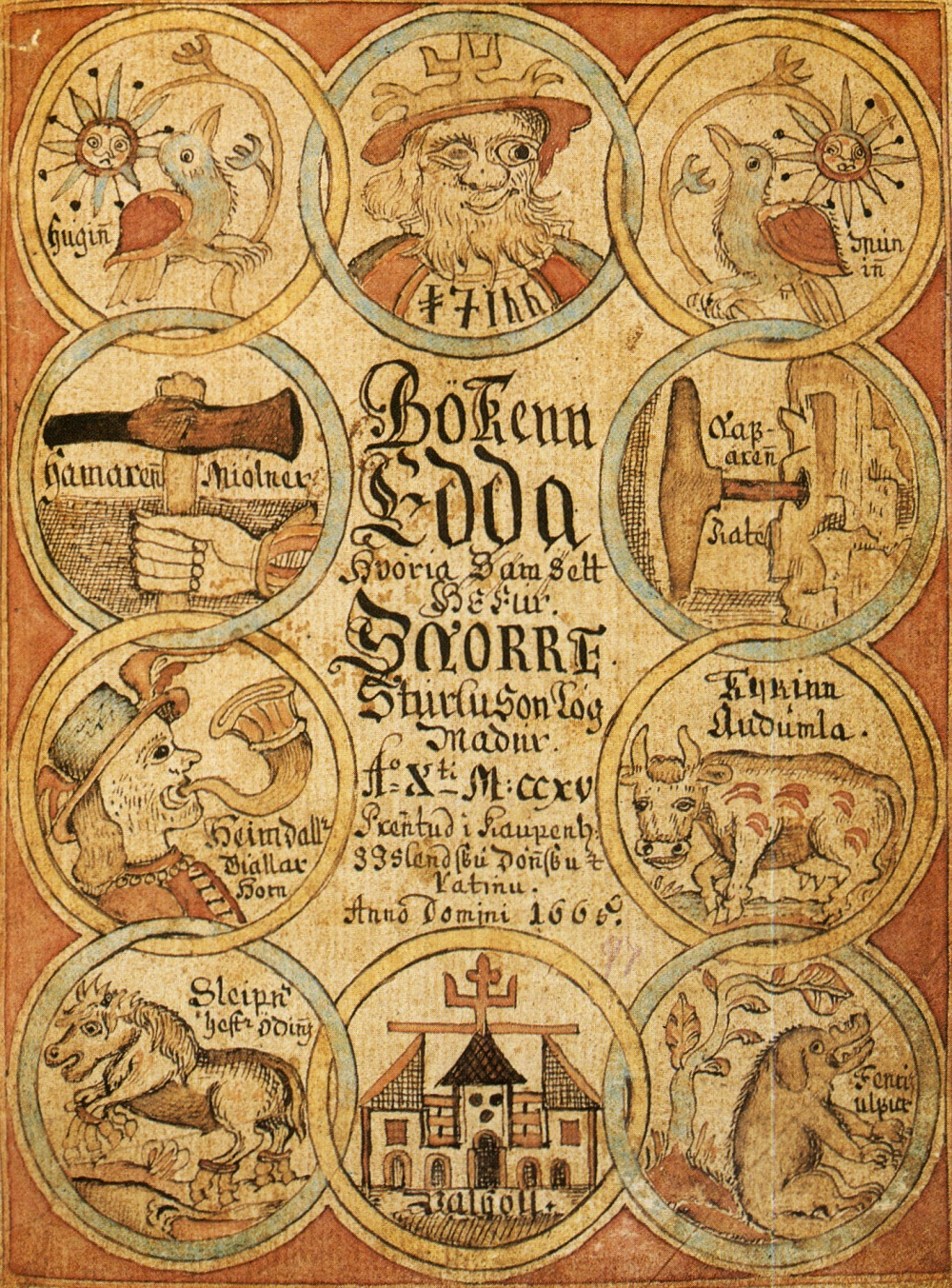
An illustrated title page of a manuscript from 1764 containing the Prose Edda (ÍB 299 4to)

Snorri Sturluson (Note: The Old Norse/Icelandic spelling of the name is Snorri Sturluson. Snorre Sturlason is the modern Norwegian and Snorre Sturlasson the modern Swedish spelling. For the construction of the name (a patronymic), see Icelandic naming conventions. The cognate English patronymic system is no longer productive linguistically, but many surnames in modern English-speaking countries contain remnants of a patronymic system (e.g., Stevenson, Thompson, etc.), and of course when foreign names are used in English. Anglicization of Scandinavian names is not standard and varies a great deal. Nearly all encyclopedias and dictionaries list Snorri under his Icelandic name. Books and articles may use Snorre Sturleson, Snorri Sturlusson, Snorre Sturlson, Snorri Sturlson, in addition to his Norwegian and Swedish names.) (Old Norse: [ˈsnorːe ˈsturloˌson]; Icelandic: [ˈstnɔrːɪ ˈstʏ(r)tlʏˌsɔːn]; 1179 – 23 September 1241) was an Icelandic historian, poet, knight, and politician. He was elected twice as lawspeaker of the Icelandic parliament, the Althing. He is commonly thought to have authored or compiled portions of the Prose Edda, which is a major source for what is today known about Norse mythology and alliterative verse, and Heimskringla, a history of the Norse kings that begins with legendary material in Ynglinga saga and moves through to early medieval Scandinavian history. For stylistic and methodological reasons, Snorri is often taken to be the author of Egil's Saga. He was assassinated in 1241 by men claiming to be agents of the King of Norway.

== Biography ==
=== Early life ===
Snorri Sturluson was born in Hvammur í Dölum (commonly transliterated as Hvamm or Hvammr) as a member of the wealthy and powerful Sturlungar clan of the Icelandic Commonwealth, in AD 1179. His parents were Sturla Þórðarson the Elder of Hvammur (also known as Hvamm-Sturla) and his second wife, Guðný Böðvarsdóttir. He had two older brothers, Þórðr (b. 1165) and Sighvatr Sturluson (b. 1170), two sisters, Helga and Vigdís, and nine half-siblings. Snorri was raised from the age of three or four by Jón Loftsson, a relative of the Norwegian royal family, in Oddi, Iceland.

Key to his political and cultural education was his fosterage at Oddi, which resulted from a settlement regarding his father's legal dealings. As Hvamm-Sturla was trying to settle a lawsuit with the priest and chieftain (Goðorðsmaðr) Páll Sölvason, Páll's wife Þorbjörg Bjarnardóttir lunged suddenly at him with a knife – intending, she said, to make him like his one-eyed hero Odin. Before the knife could strike its target, though, bystanders deflected the blow so it hit his cheek instead. The resulting settlement would have beggared Páll, but Jón Loftsson intervened in the Althing to mitigate the judgment and, to compensate Sturla, offered to raise and educate Snorri. Thus Snorri received an excellent education and forged connections he might not otherwise have been able to. He was educated by Sæmundr fróði, grandfather of Jón Loftsson, at Oddi, and never returned to his parents' home. His father died in 1183 and his mother, as his guardian, soon squandered Snorri's share of the inheritance. Jón Loftsson died in 1197. The two families then arranged a marriage in 1199 between Snorri and Herdís, the daughter of Bersi Vermundarson. From her father, Snorri inherited an estate at Borg, as well as a chieftainship, and soon acquired more property and additional chieftainships.

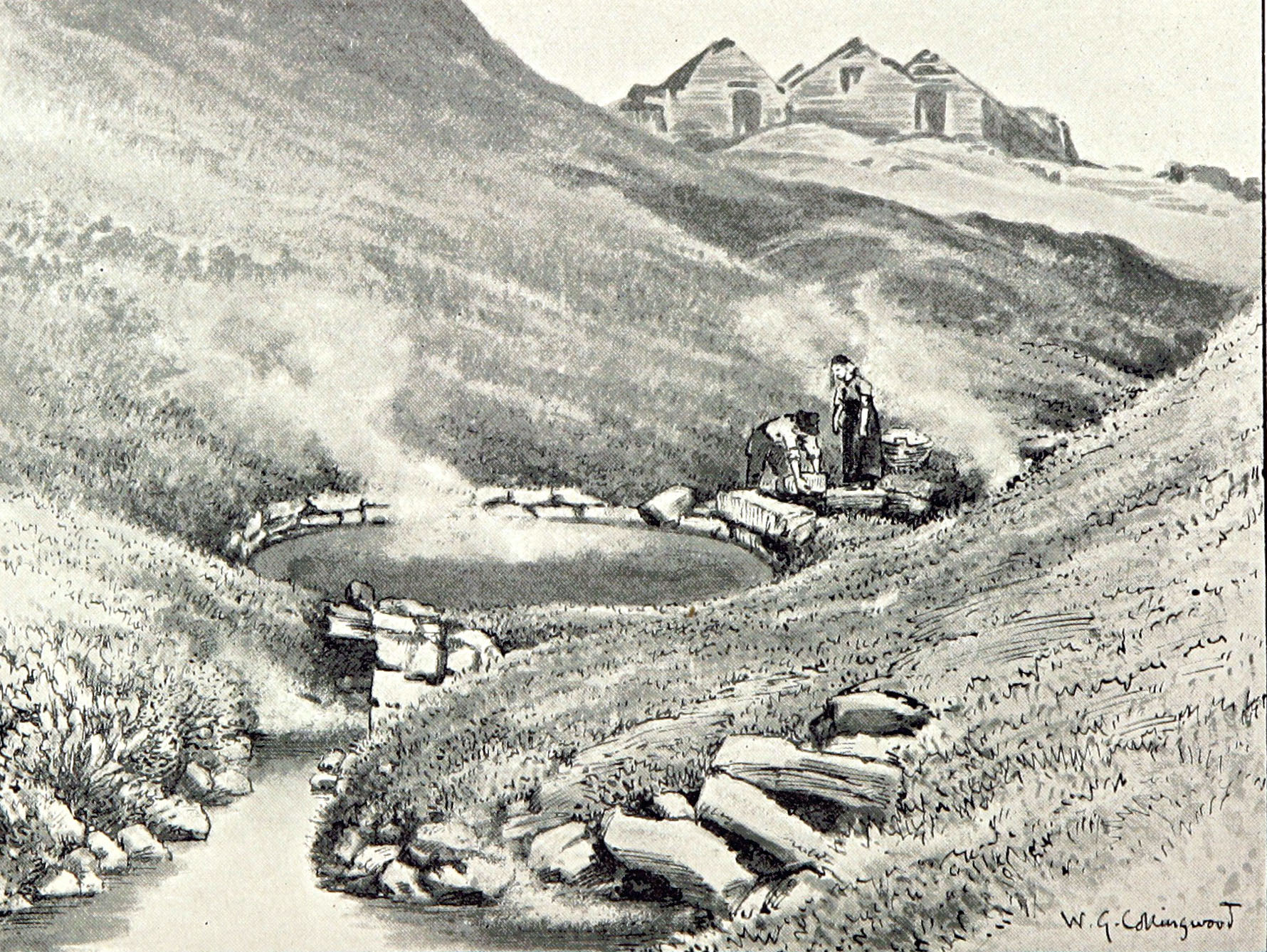
Snorri's Bathhouse at Reykholt

Snorri and Herdís were together for four years at Borg. They had at least two children, Hallbera and Jón. The marriage succumbed to Snorri's philandering, and in 1206, he settled without Herdís in Reykholt as the manager of an estate. He also made significant improvements to the estate, including an outdoor bath fed by hot springs. The bath was known as Snorralaug, and the buildings have been preserved to some extent. During his initial years at Reykholt he fathered another five children, with three different women: Guðrún Hreinsdóttir, Oddný, and Þuríður Hallsdóttir.

=== National life ===
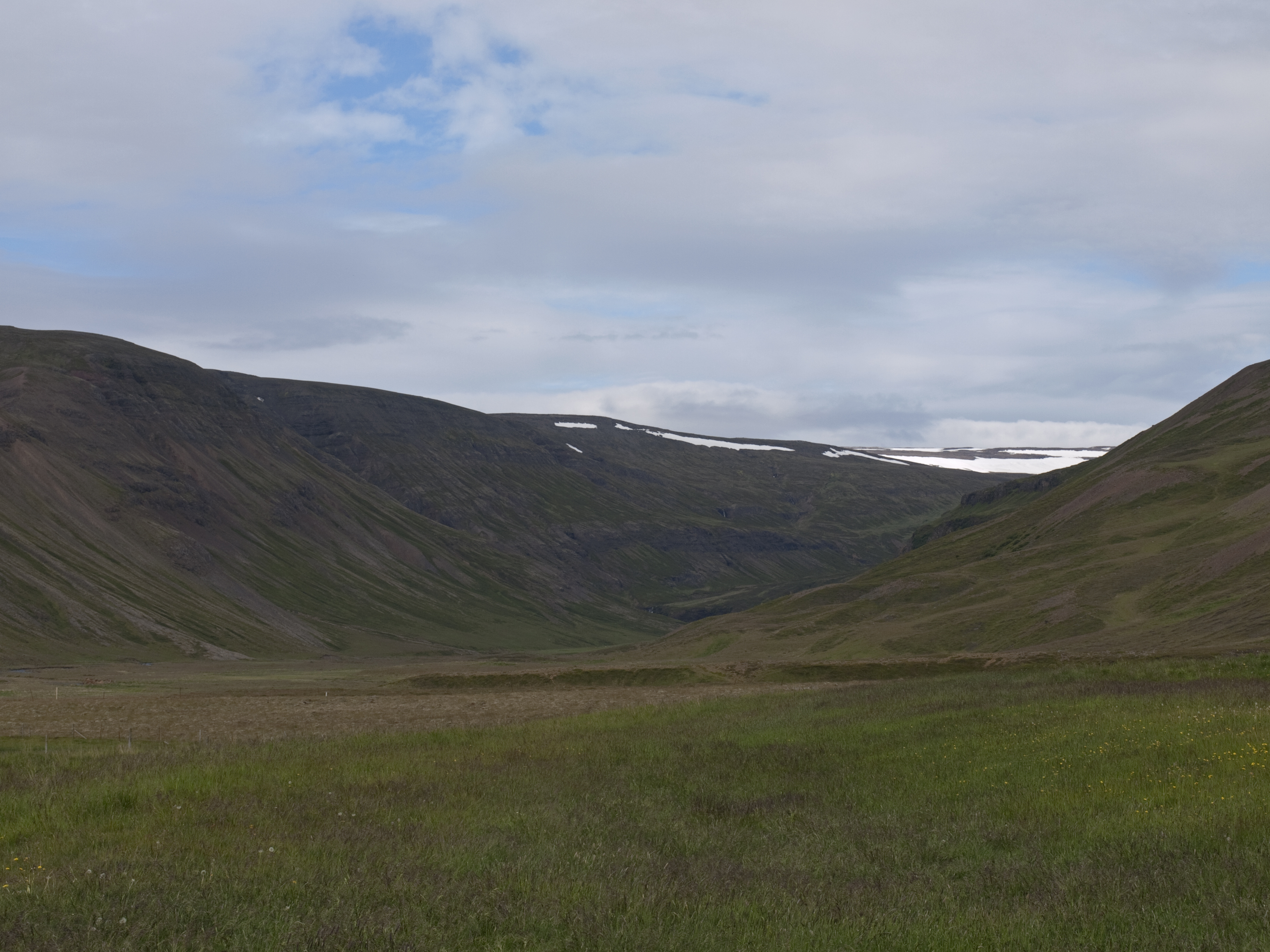
Skeggi Valley in Hvammur

Snorri quickly became known as a poet, and also functioned as a lawyer. In 1215, he became lawspeaker of the Althing, the only public office of the Icelandic commonwealth and a position of high respect. In the summer of 1218, he left the lawspeaker position and sailed to Norway, by royal invitation. There he became well acquainted with the teenage King Hákon Hákonarson and his co-regent, Jarl Skúli. He spent the winter as house guest of the jarl. They showered gifts upon him, including the ship in which he sailed, and he in return wrote poetry about them. In the summer of 1219, he met his Swedish colleague, the lawspeaker Eskil Magnusson, and his wife, Kristina Nilsdotter Blake, in Skara. They were both related to royalty and probably gave Snorri an insight into the history of Sweden.

Snorri was mainly interested in history and culture. The Norwegian regents, however, cultivated Snorri, made him a skutilsvein (a senior title roughly equivalent to knight), and received an oath of loyalty. The king hoped to extend his realm to Iceland, which he could do by a resolution of the Althing, where Snorri exerted much influence due to his political ties and legal acumen.

In 1220, Snorri returned to Iceland and by 1222 was back as law speaker of the Althing, which he held this time until 1232. The basis of his election was entirely his fame as a poet. Politically he was the king's spokesman, supporting union with Norway, a platform that acquired him enemies among the chiefs. In 1224, Snorri married Hallveig Ormsdottir (c. 1199 – 1241), a granddaughter of Jón Loftsson, now a widow of great means with two young sons, and made a contract of joint property ownership (or helmingafélag) with her. Their children did not survive to adulthood, but Hallveig's sons and seven of Snorri's children did live to adulthood.

Snorri was the most powerful chieftain in Iceland during the years 1224–1230.

=== Failure in Iceland ===
Many of the other chiefs found his position as royal office-holder contrary to their interests, especially the other Sturlungar. Snorri's strategy seems to have been to consolidate power over them, at which point he could offer Iceland to the king. His first moves were civic. On the death in 1222 of Sæmundur, son of Jón Loftsson, he became a suitor for the hand of his daughter, Sólveig. Herdís' silent vote did nothing for his suit. His nephew, Sturla Sighvatsson, Snorri's political opponent, stepped in to marry her in 1223, the year before Snorri married Hallveig.

A period of clan feuding followed. Snorri raised an armed party under his nephew Böðvar Þórðarson, and another under his son Órækja, with the intent of executing a first strike against his brother Sighvatur and Sturla Sighvatsson. It is possible that Snorri perceived that only resolute, saga-like actions could achieve his objective, but if so he proved unwilling or incapable of carrying them out. Alternatively, he might have done this as military posturing or performance of power. On the eve of battle he dismissed those forces and offered terms to his brother.

Sighvatur and Sturla drove Snorri into the countryside with a force of 1000 men, where he sought refuge among other goðar. Órækja undertook guerrilla operations in the fjords of western Iceland and fighting carried on.

Haakon IV made an effort to intervene from afar, inviting all of Iceland's chieftains to a peace conference in Norway. This maneuver was transparent to Sighvatur, who suspected, as apparently Snorri did not, that the king was planning a maneuver against the goðar in Norway. Instead of killing his opponents he began to insist that they take the king up on his offer.

Órækja's fate was capture by his cousin Sturla during an ostensible peace negotiation at Reykjaholt. Þorleifur Þórðarson, a cousin of Snorri's, was also captured. Þorleifur had come to his assistance with 800 men, but was deserted by Snorri on the battlefield in a flare-up over the chain of command. In 1237, Snorri thought it best to travel to Norway and join the king.

=== The end of Snorri and the Commonwealth ===
The reign of Haakon IV (Hákon Hákonarson), King of Norway, was troubled by civil war relating to questions of succession and was at various times divided into quasi-independent regions under rival contenders. There were always plots against the king and questions of loyalty but he nevertheless managed to build up the Norwegian state from what it had been.

When Snorri arrived in Norway for the second time, it was clear to the king that he was no longer a reliable agent. The conflict between Haakon and Skúli was beginning to escalate into civil war. Snorri stayed with the jarl and his son, and the jarl gave him the jarl title, hoping to command his allegiance. In August 1238, Sighvatur and four of his sons (Sturla, Markús, Kolbeinn, and Þórður Krókur, the latter two executed after the battle), were killed at the Battle of Örlygsstaðir in Iceland against Gissur Þorvaldsson and Kolbein the Young, chiefs whom they had provoked. Snorri, Órækja, and Þorleifur requested permission to return home. As the king now could not predict Snorri's behavior, permission was denied. He was explicitly ordered to remain in Norway on the basis of his honorary rank. Skúli on the other hand gave permission and helped them book passage.

Snorri must have had his own ideas about the king's position and the validity of his orders, but at any rate he chose to disobey them; his words according to the Sturlunga saga, út vil ek (literally 'out want I', but idiomatically 'I will go home'), have become proverbial in Icelandic. He returned to Iceland in 1239. The king was distracted by the necessity to confront Skúli, who declared himself king in 1239. Skúli was defeated militarily and killed in 1240. Meanwhile, Snorri resumed his chieftainship and made a bid to crush Gissur by prosecuting him in court for the deaths of his brother Sighvatr and nephew Sturla. After the jarl's defeat, Haakon sent two agents to Gissur bearing a secret letter with orders to kill or capture Snorri. Gissur was being invited now to join the unionist movement. A meeting at the Althing was arranged for the summer of 1241 but Gissur and Kolbein arrived with several hundred men. Snorri and 120 men formed around a church. Gissur chose to pay fines rather than to attack.

Hallveig died of natural causes. When the family bickered over the inheritance, Hallveig's sons, Klaeing and Orm, asked assistance from their uncle Gissur. Holding a meeting with them and Kolbein the Younger, Gissur brought out the letter. Orm refused. Shortly after, Snorri received a letter in cipher runes warning him of the plot, but he could not understand them.

Afterwards Gissur led seventy men on a daring raid to his house, achieving complete surprise. Snorri Sturluson was assassinated in his house at Reykholt in autumn of 1241. It is not clear that he was given the option of surrender. He fled to the cellar. There, Símon knútur asked Árni the Bitter to strike him. Then Snorri said: Eigi skal hǫggva! – "Do not strike!" Símon answered: Hǫgg þú! – "You strike now!" Snorri replied: Eigi skal hǫggva! – "Do not strike!" and these were his last words.

This act was not popular in either Iceland or Norway. To diminish the odium, the king insisted that if Snorri had submitted, he would have been spared. The fact that he could make such an argument reveals how far his influence in Iceland had come. Haakon went on suborning the chiefs of Iceland. In 1262, the Althing ratified union with Norway and royal authority was instituted in Iceland. Each member swore an oath of personal loyalty to the king, a practice which continued as each new king came to the throne, until absolute and hereditary monarchy was formally accepted by the Icelanders in 1662.

== Legacy ==
Snorri Sturluson's writings provide information and indications concerning persons and events influencing the peoples inhabiting North Europe during periods for which relevant information is scarce: thus, for example, he can be used to illuminate relations between England and Scandinavia during the 10th and 11th centuries. Snorri is considered a figure of enduring importance in this regard, Halvdan Koht describing his work as "surpassing anything else that the Middle Ages have left us of historical literature". On the other hand, the historian Gwyn Jones describes Snorri as "never servile to fact". He also provided an early account of the discovery of Vinland.

To an extent, the legacy of Snorri Sturluson also played a role in politics long after his death. His writings could be used in support of the claims of later Norwegian kings concerning the venerability and extent of their rule. Later, Heimskringla factored in establishing a national identity during the Norwegian romantic nationalism in mid-19th century.

Icelandic perception of Snorri in the 20th century and to date has been colored by the historical views adopted when Iceland sought to sever its ties with Denmark, any revision of which still has strong nationalistic sentiments to contend with. To serve such views, Snorri and other leading Icelanders of his time are sometimes judged with an element of presentism, drawing on concepts that came into vogue only centuries later, such as state, independence, sovereignty, and nation.

Jorge Luis Borges and María Kodama studied and translated the Gylfaginning to Spanish, providing a biographic account of Snorri at the prologue.

"Nine worlds I remember", one of the epigraphs to chapter IV of Carl Sagan's Cosmos, is a quotation from Snorri's Edda.

== Memorials ==
- Snorres gate, a street in the district of St. Hanshaugen in Oslo, was named in his honor during 1896. There is also Snorrabraut, a thoroughfare in Eastern Central Reykjavik, Iceland, dating from the 1940s.
- A statue of Snorri Sturluson, by Gustav Vigeland, is located at Reykholt. The Norwegian Government donated the statue to the Icelandic nation in 1947. The original intention of donating it on the 700th anniversary of Snorri's death, was precluded by World War II (Norway and Iceland were occupied by, respectively, Germany and the United States at the time). A copy of the Reykholt statue was unveiled in Bergen, Norway during 1948.
- A model of the Reykholt statue appeared on an Icelandic commemorative postage stamp in 1941.
- The 700th anniversary of his death was also recognized by the issue of a set of six Norwegian commemorative postage stamps during 1941. Each stamp featured illustrations from Heimskringla by Norwegian artist Harald Damsleth.
- Snorrastofa Cultural / Research Centre in Reykholt was established on 6 September 1988, with opening ceremonies attended by Vigdís Finnbogadóttir, President of Iceland, and King Olav V of Norway.

== Purchase of a 1594 Snorri text ==
In 2026, Erling Haaland and his father Alf-Inge Haaland purchased a 16th-century copy of Snorri's chronicles for a Norwegian record sum of 1.2 million Norwegian crowns ($133,636). They donated it to the Haalands' home town of Time. According to Reuters, it will be put on permanent exhibition, so that residents of the region (Jaeren) can read about their region's history.

== See also ==
- Sauðafell Raid

== Sources ==
- Bagge, Sverre (1991). Society and Politics in Snorri Sturluson's Heimskringla. (University of California Press). ISBN 0-520-06887-4.
- Brown, Nancy Marie (2012) Song of the Vikings: Snorri and the Making of Norse Myths (St. Martin's Press) ISBN 0230338844
