= Hallgrímur Helgason =

Icelandic writer

Hallgrimur Helgason
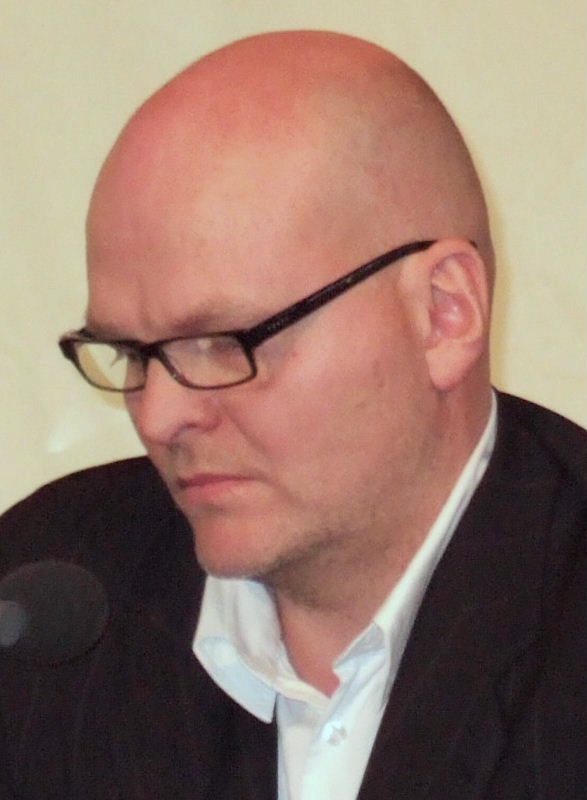
- Helgason in 2006
- Born: February 18, 1959 (age 67); Reykjavík, Iceland
- Occupation: Writer
- Website: hallgrimurhelgason.com

Hallgrímur Helgason (born February 18, 1959) is an Icelandic painter, novelist, translator, and columnist.

== Biography ==
Hallgrímur Helgason was born in Reykjavík, Iceland, on February 18, 1959. He started out as a painter but gradually became a writer as well. His best known books are 101 Reykjavik (1996), The Hitman's Guide to Housecleaning (2008) and The Thousand Degree Woman (2011). Two of his novels have been turned into films and four of them have been adapted for the stage. He has held over 30 solo exhibitions in Iceland, Sweden, Denmark and France, and his works can be found in the collections of several art museums.

Hallgrímur's father, Helgi Hallgrímsson, was an engineer, the former head of the Icelandic Road Administration. His mother was Margrét Schram, a retired kindergarten teacher. His sister Nína Helgadóttir works for the Red Cross, his brother Gunnar Helgason is an actor and an award-winning writer of children's’ books, and his brother Ásmundur Helgason works in advertising and publishing.

In 1984 Hallgrímur fathered his first child, Hallgerður Hallgrímsdóttir. In 1985, he met flautist Áshildur Haraldsdóttir, a student at the Boston Conservatory. They lived together in Boston, New York and Paris, got married in 1988 and divorced in 1992. In the years 2003–2009, Hallgrímur lived with Oddný Sturludóttir, a city councilor. They have two children together, Kári Daníel born 2003, and Margrét María born 2005. Since 2009 Hallgrímur has been living with Agla Magnúsdóttir, senior adviser at the Icelandic Literature Center. Hallgrímur and Agla live in Reykjavík and the island of Hrísey, with his younger kids and a dog named Lukka.

== 1980s ==
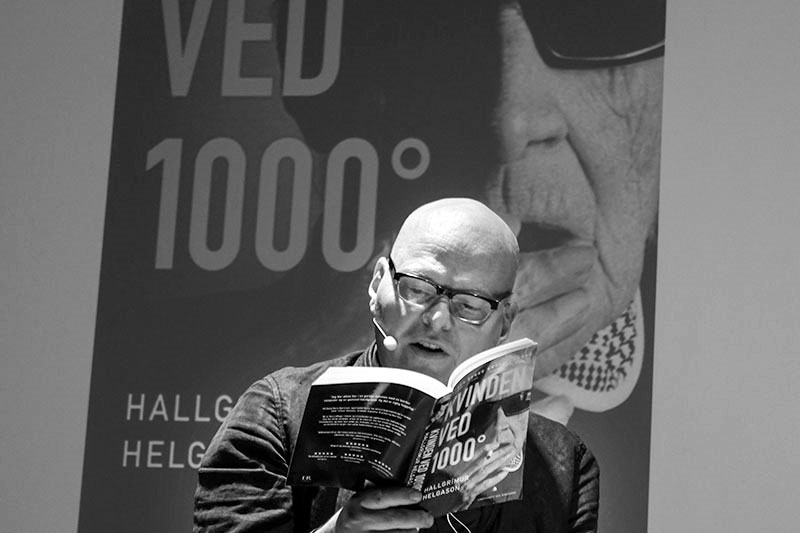
Hallgrímur Helgason in Aarhus, Denmark (2016)

Hallgrímur started out as a visual artist, studying at the Iceland Academy of the Arts (1980–81) and The Academy of Fine Arts in Munich, Germany (1981–82). Unsatisfied with both, he started painting on his own, mostly romantic colorful and “beautiful” landscapes inspired by his native Iceland, a clear break with the current fashions of conceptual and minimal art. After a couple of personal shows in Reykjavík, he spent the winter of 1985–86 in Boston, where he showed at Bromfield Gallery on Newbury Street, and met the Starn Twins (Doug and Mike Starn) and other artists represented by Stux Gallery, located in the same building.

From 1986 to '89 Hallgrímur lived in New York City, painting and drawing, with moderate success, showing at Hal Bromm Gallery, Stux Gallery and other places. In an effort to support himself he started writing weekly articles for a newspaper back home in Reykjavik, describing life in the Big Apple. He also developed his own weekly radio program, named “Radio Manhattan”, for Icelandic State Radio, recording his impressions of the streets and life around his home in Hell's Kitchen and shipping them up north on a cassette. Encouraged by the good reception to the articles, as well as his radio rants, Hallgrímur felt the pressure to take a break from painting and try to write a novel.

== First novel ==
Hallgrímur Helgason's first novel, Hella, was published in 1990, a visual and cinematic story that takes place in the small village of Hella, situated in southern Iceland, an agricultural county surrounded by the volcanoes Mt. Hekla and Eyjafjallajökull and famous for its big earthquakes. Hallgrímur aims for a totally objective tone, tries to stay away from poetic descriptions and the use of adjectives. The text never enters the mind or the feelings of the characters, describing everything from the outside. It's an attempt at letting the inner world be read through the signs of the outer visual world. Inspired by Flaubert's Madame Bovary as well as Duchamp's Large Glass, the book tells the story of one summer in the life of a 14-year-old girl who gets her first job at the highway diner and has her first sexual encounter in a tent at the local horse fair. The latter coincides with a small earthquake shaking the area. The novel can be read as one big metaphor for the transition from virgin to woman. The novel received a lukewarm reception—at most the critics said the book was interesting—and sales were modest.

== Paris years ==
Between 1990 and 1995 Hallgrímur lived in Paris, painting and writing. In New York the subject of his paintings had shifted from landscape to figures: stylized in the manner of Keith Haring and the late eighties, it seemed the artist was trying hard to update the Picasso nude. In Paris his paintings at first turned more “European”, in the manner of (the American) George Condo, until Hallgrímur found his more personal style, more realistic and cartoonish at the same time, by leaving out the background. The figures were painted in the middle of a canvas which was left virgin white around them. In Paris, Hallgrímur had two solo exhibitions in the early nineties, at Galerie Alain Gutharc and Galerie Philippe Rizzo.

Here he also wrote his second novel, Þetta er allt að koma (Things Are Going Great), which was published in 1994, and became Hallgrímur's breakthrough as a writer. Here he found his true writing voice, his own style overflowing with words, ideas and stories. The book is an ironic take on the traditional Icelandic mini-celebrity biography, a genre that was very popular at the time. Ragga Birna is a “famous” actress and musician who remembers her life in the most positive light. Her life is full of failures, but she meets all of them with the self-delusional phrase “Things are going great!”. She goes from the piano to violin, from violin to viola, from viola to singing, from singing to acting, from acting to movie-acting, from movie-acting to bad movie-acting. The reader slowly learns that this woman has never had any talent for any art in her life. Yet her whole being has been commit-ted to fulfil her dream of “making it” as an artist. The character of Ragga Birna and her tragic life story was based on Hallgrímur's impressions of the artist's life in Iceland and the States during the seventies and eighties, and makes good fun of the big eighties idea of “making it”. Indeed, the book makes fun of almost every aspect of artistic life in Iceland in the years from Ragga's birth in 1959 until she finally reaches her “stardom” in 1994, when she is paralysed from waist down in an accident on the set of a no-budget Icelandic Viking movie and ends up on the front page in a wheelchair, all smiling and happy with her long overdue fame.

The book became a local hit and a theatre version was put on stage at the National Theatre of Iceland in 2004, directed by Baltasar Kormákur.

== 101 Reykjavík ==
Hallgrímur spent autumn 1995 in Park Slope, Brooklyn, NY, writing his third novel, 101 Reykjavík. It was published in 1996 and turned into a successful movie in the year 2000, directed by Baltasar Kormákur and starring Hilmir Snær Guðnason and Victoria Abril. The novel takes its title from the postal code of the Reykjavík downtown area. It is a first person narrative, set in the strange mind of Hlynur Björn, a mid-nineties slacker who never leaves the downtown area, is unemployed and lives with his mother. He spends his days on the internet or watching videos, and his nights at the K-bar, a fictional hangout based on the famous Kaffibarinn, which at the time was partly owned by Damon Albarn, the famous singer of Blur. The novel coincided with and accidentally captured the rise of Reykjavík as a trendy city, launched by the fame of its best known citizen, Björk.

Hallgrímur invented the character Hlynur Björn in the summer of 1990 and used him from time to time as his own Borat, allowing him guest appearances on his radio show, Radio Manhattan, and thus developing his strange style of thinking and talking over a period of five years. The idea for the plot came partly from the French movie, Gazon Maudit, by Josiane Balasko (also starring Victoria Abril), and Shakespeare’s Hamlet. Like Hamlet, Hlynur Björn becomes burdened by his mother’s sex life, when she comes out of the closet as a lesbian, and introduces him to her girlfriend, the much younger Lolla, whom Hlynur Björn already has slept with. Things get even more complicated when it is revealed that Lolla is pregnant.

The book was originally met with negative reviews and poor sales in Iceland, but later found an international readership, after the movie won prizes at several film festivals. It was nominated on behalf of Iceland for the Nordic Council Literature Prize in 1999. It became a bestseller in Italy and Poland and has been published in 14 languages. American novelist Tim Sandlin famously wrote in his review: “Imagine if Henry Miller had written Tropic of Cancer on crack instead of wine.”

== Author of Iceland ==
Since 1996 Hallgrímur has been living in his hometown, Reykjavík. In 1998 he published his first book of poetry, Collected Poems 1978–1998. A truly post-modern work, it was all written in the Icelandic nineteenth-century tradition of rhyming poetry, full of jokes and irony, with a nod to American rap lyrics, and was a clear break with the serious modern tradition of the twentieth century in Icelandic poetry. There were no poems about nature, silent lakes or lava fields.

In 2001 Hallgrímur published his biggest and most ambitious novel, Höfundur Íslands (The Author of Iceland). It was a succès de scandale, since the main character was based on the biggest Icelandic writer, Halldór Laxness (1902–1998), who received the Nobel prize in 1955. The novel tells the story of a very old and famous Icelandic writer who dies and wakes up inside a novel he wrote some fifty years earlier. Thus the author lives on in his work. The main character, Einar J. Grímsson, is partly based on Laxness and the novel he's trapped in is inspired by Laxness's biggest novel, Independent People. Its publication caused outrage among the old leftist elite in Iceland who felt it was sacrilege to write about Laxness, especially his communist past. The Author of Iceland has been translated into German, Danish, Norwegian, Finnish and Italian. It won the Icelandic Literary Prize in 2001.

== Grim ==
Since 1995, Hallgrímur has been working on his cartoon self and alter-ego called Grim. A Tintin-style mélange of Dracula and Pinocchio, the long-nosed and fang-toothed character symbolizes the role of the artist/writer, who sucks blood out of real people's lives and then goes on making up stories about them. Hallgrímur has made paintings and drawings featuring Grim, and devoted a couple of exhibitions to this strange fellow. A catalogue, “Best of Grim”, was published in Iceland in 2004, by Forlagid, and in 2005 French publisher Actes Sud published a book, Les Contes de Grim, featuring all the existing Grim works.

== Mr. Universe — a "ciné-roman" ==
After the big and ambitious Author of Iceland, Hallgrímur published the short and comic sci-fi novel Mr. Universe, written in Italy in the summer of 2002. Written as a mock Hollywood blockbuster movie, it tells the tale of the fight between God and mankind. God lives on a small planet, Planet Zero, in the middle of his universe, managing all his 716 different mankinds on as many planets. One day he learns that his mankind on Planet 607 (Earth) has managed to clone itself. God gets angry and decides to kill off this annoying mankind and replace it with a new one. When the deceased souls from planet 607, who reside in the VIP camps at Planet Zero, learn about the big boss's plan, they decide to try to save their planet. Their leader is Napoleon Nixon (a soul that has been both men) who leads the operation against God, a journey that takes him inside Planet Zero, where the Devil reigns. Keeping in line with the movie-like “ciné-roman”, all the characters of the novel are cast by the author. God is played by Marlon Brando, Woody Allen is his assistant, Salman Rushdie the scientist in charge of creating a new mankind. Anthony Hopkins is Napoleon Nixon and his muscular assistant is played by Mike Tyson, in the role of the Devil is Leonardo DiCaprio. Mr. Universe was published in France, in 2015, under the title “La grosse colère”.

== Stormland ==
Stormland (2005) was Hallgrímur's first contemporary novel since 101 Reykjavík. Set in North Iceland, in the small town of Sauðárkrókur, it tells the story of Böddi, an angry blogger in the countryside, who dreams of a revolution and a complete overhaul of the western capitalist system. Soaked in German literature, philosophy and romantic idealism à la Nietzsche, after his years of study in Berlin, he finds it hard to fit into his old and very small home town. Böddi is the guy who never makes compromises. Living with his lonely mother, the TV addict, he loses his teaching job on the first page, his love midway and his mind at the end of the book.

Stormland was written at the height of the boom and bubble years in Icelandic history, when the nation had completely lost itself in the materialistic craziness that led up to the big financial Crash in 2008. It became a bestseller in Denmark, and has also been translated into Norwegian, Swedish and German. It was nominated for the Nordic Council Literature Prize in 2007.

A movie based on the novel, Stormland, was released in Iceland in 2011. It was written and directed by Marteinn Thorsson, and starring Ólafur Darri Ólafsson in his first leading film role. His performance earned him an Edda Award for Best Actor.

== The Hitman's Guide to Housecleaning ==
Hallgrímur's only novel written in English was also his only flirt with the crime novel genre. Tomislav Boksic, aka Toxic, is a professional hitman for the Croatian Mafia in New York. His record is near flawless, he has 66 killings on his CV, when killing number 67 proves to be a failure. The victim turns out to be an FBI agent. Forced to flee the States, Toxic finds himself at JFK at the beginning of the novel. There he spots the FBI agent waiting for him at the gate. He turns and hides in the men's room, contemplating his moves, when out from one of the stalls comes another bald man, who looks a bit like him. Being a pro, Toxic kills the bald man, takes on his clothes, ID, passport and air ticket. The dead man turns out to be a TV evangelist from Richmond, Virginia, on his way to Iceland to preach on a local Christian TV station. So the Croatian hitman arrives in Reykjavík, disguised as a TV preacher. A classic tale of mistaken identities, the novel offers an outsider's view of Iceland, that according to the author was “a fun challenge: To write about my home country as if I had never been there before.”

== Suit & Tie ==
In the fall of 2009, Hallgrímur was asked to open the Kapittel Literature Festival in Stavanger, Norway. For the occasion he wrote a five-minute-long poem titled Suit & Tie, commemorating the first anniversary of the financial crash that hit Iceland so hard in October 2008. He later recorded his rendering of it, which has been published on YouTube.

== The Thousand Degree Woman ==
A historical novel published in 2011, The Thousand Degree Woman (in some countries titled Woman at 1000°) is based on the real life of Brynhildur Georgía Björnsson, whose father was one of the few Icelanders who had fought for the Nazis in World War Two, and whom Hallgrímur accidentally met over the telephone in 2006, when he was aiding his ex-wife during an election campaign for the Social Democratic Party. Ms. Björnsson died in 2007 but had published her biography in 1983. Her father had also published his biography in 1988. Brynhildur's grandfather was the first president of Iceland, Mr. Sveinn Björnsson.

== Portraits and darkness ==
In 2012, Hallgrímur picked up his paintbrushes again. The result was a show in September 2013 at the Tveir hrafnar listhús, Reykjavík, of black-and-white portraits of famous Icelandic authors from the first half of the twentieth century. Douglas Coupland wrote about the show for Artforum.

Another show followed in September 2015, titled “Acrylic on Darkness I - Outside Your House, at Night, While You’re Sleeping”. It consisted of nightscapes from the Reykjavík suburbs, cars parked in driveways outside houses, hardly visible in the pitch black dark. “We have darkness most of the time up here, on our northern island. Still we have hardly ever painted it or done art about it.”

For the big group show "Just Painted 2" at the Reykjavik Art Museum in 2015, Hallgrímur did a big portrait of Jón Gnarr, the comedian turned mayor of Reykjavík, titled "The Gnarr Family", featuring a family of 8, where all the characters were “played” by Gnarr.

== Seasick in Munich ==
Hallgrímur's first and only autobiographical novel, Seasick in Munich, was published in 2015. It describes one winter in the life of the author, when he studied art at the famous Art Academy in Munich in 1981–82. “The most difficult winter in my life,” according to the author. It's a classic Bildungsroman but with a fantastical twist that nods both to Hamsun’s Hunger and Kafka’s A Hunger Artist. It’s the story of young man, a shy 21-year old from a provincial and isolated country, who for the first time in his life is made to live on his own, in a big European city. Shy, non-German speaking, and not fitting in with the latest trends at the academy, he has a hard time adapting to the difficult Bavarian capital. He hadn’t even had a beer yet, since beer was banned in Iceland until 1989.

Very much an artist’s novel, it describes the soul-searching process of the young man, his quest for finding himself, and his wrestling with the giants of the past, like Halldór Laxness, Gustave Flaubert and Edvard Munch, but mostly Marcel Duchamp and The Large Glass.

The book was a success with the critics (“One of Helgason’s best books” - Fréttablaðið) and sold well. In Iceland the main discussion around it, though, was about the chapter describing a rape that the young man experienced on his Italian trip, at Christmas night in Florence. In an ugly newspaper column, that caused an outrage among readers, Icelandic writer Gudbergur Bergsson (born 1932) “slut shamed” his colleague Hallgrímur for bringing this topic into light, accusing him of using a rape scene to sell his book, and finishing off by asking “which faggot had such bad taste?”

== Sixty Kilos Trilogy ==
Hallgrímur has written three novels about a fictional town in the north of Iceland, Segulfjörður (probably based on Siglufjörður), at the turn of the century. Iceland was still a colony of Denmark then. The village is very poor but profits from the herring boom, which changes the town and its inhabitants radically.

The narrative focuses on Eilífur Guðmundsson, who arrives back home only to find that his house has been snowed under. Only his son, Gestur Eilífsson, survived by drinking the milk from their cow. Gestur's coming of age coincides with the development of the nation. In the third book, Gestur leaves for America.

Hallgrímur won the Icelandic Literary Prize in 2018 for the first book, Sixty Kilos of Sunshine and for the second book, Sixty Kilos of Knockouts, in 2021. The books have been translated into French (Gallimard) and German (Tropen), among other languages. The English translation is forthcoming.

== Bibliography ==
=== Novels ===
- Hella (1990)
- Þetta er allt að koma (Things Are Going Great, 1994)
- 101 Reykjavík (1996)
- Höfundur Íslands (The Author of Iceland, 2001)
- Herra Alheimur (Mr. Universe, 2003)
- Rokland (Stormland, 2005)
- The Hitman's Guide to Housecleaning (written in English and translated by the author into Icelandic as 10 ráð til að hætta að drepa fólk og byrja að vaska upp, 2008)
- Konan við 1000° (Woman at 1000°, 2011)
- Sjóveikur í München (Seasick in Munich, 2015)
- Sextíu kíló af sólskini (Sixty Kilos of Sunshine, 2018)
- Sextíu kíló af kjaftshöggum (Sixty Kilos of Knockouts, 2021)
- Sextíu kíló af sunnudögum (Sixty Kilos of Sundays, 2024)

=== Poetry ===
- Ljóðmæli 1978–1998 (Collected Poetry 1978–1998, 1998)
- Suit & Tie (2009)
- Koma jól? (2021, illustrated by Rán Flygenring)
- Drungabrim í dauðum sjó (2025)

=== Selected solo exhibitions ===
- Ásmundarsalur, Reykjavík (1984)
- The Living Art Museum, Reykjavík (1984)
- Listmunahúsið, Reykjavík (1985)
- Gallery Hallgerður, Reykjavík (1986)
- Bromfield Gallery, Boston (1986)
- The Living Art Museum, Reykjavík (1987)
- Hal Bromm Gallery, New York (1988)
- Reykjavík Art Museum, Reykjavík (1991)
- The Living Art Museum, Reykjavík (1992)
- Galerie Alain Gutharc, Paris (1994)
- Galleri Isidor, Malmö (1995)
- Gallery Sævar Karl, Reykjavík (1996)
- Galerie Philippe Rizzo, Paris (1997)
- Gallery Sævar Karl, Reykjavík (2000)
- Kópavogur Art Museum, Reykjavík (2003)
- Gallery Turpentine, Reykjavík (2006)
- Gallery Turpentine, Reykjavík (2007)
- Gallery Icelandic Contemporary Art, Reykjavík (2009)
- Gerduberg Culture Center, Reykjavík (2012)
- Tveir hrafnar listhús, Reykjavík (2013)
- Gallery Christoffer Egelund, Copenhagen (2015)
- Tveir hrafnar listhús, Reykjavík (2015)

=== Selected group shows ===
- "Young Artists", Reykjavík Art Museum, Reykjavík (1983)
- "New Painting", JL-house, Reykjavík 1983
- Now Gallery, New York (1985)
- Hal Bromm Gallery, New York (1986)
- Stux Gallery, Boston (1987)
- Galerie Leger, Malmö (1987)
- "Icelandic Artists", Privatbanken, New York (1987)
- "Icelandic Artists", Växjö Konsthall, Växjö, Sweden (1992)
- "Aurora 5", Joensuu, Finland (1992)
- "Art Hotel", Hilton Hotel, Amsterdam (1994)
- "Bazar du jour", Galerie du Jour, Paris (1995)
- "L'art d'aimer", Espace Paul Boyé, Séte, France (1995)
- Galerie Alain Gutharc, Paris (1995)
- "Wolemi-Pine", Kópavogur Art Museum (1995)
- "Selfportraits, Mocca-Café, Reykjavík (1997)
- "Mutants", Galerie Philippe Rizzo, Paris (1997)
- "Colorblind", Salle de Bains, Rotterdam (1997)
- "Flögð og fögur skinn", The Living Art Museum, Reykjavík (1998)
- "Ainsi de suite 3", Centre d'art, Séte, France (1999)
- "Hot Spot", Kulturbahnhof Eller, Düsseldorf (1999)
- "Tilfelli", Epal, Reykjavík (2000)
- "Hors les cartes", Centre Régional d'art, Séte, France (2000)
- "The Golden Brush", Thorshavn, Faroe Islands (2002)
- "Des del confins de la terra", La Capella, Barcelona (2004)
- "Bye Bye, Iceland", Akureyri Art Museum (2008)
- "Icelandic Contemporary Portraits, Akureyri Art Museum, (2014)
- "Just Painted 2", Reykjavík Art Museum, Reykjavík (2016)
- "Whatever... Works!", Tveir hrafnar listhús, Reykjavík (2016)

=== Theatre ===
- Óbreyttur maður (A Simple Man, a short monologue 1989)
- Kossinn (The Kiss, a romantic comedy 1999)
- 1000 eyja sósa (Thousand Island Sauce, a short monologue, 1999)
- Skáldanótt (Poet's Night, a play in verse, 2000)
- Wake Me Up Before You Go Go (a high-school musical 2001)
- Rúm fyrir einn (Single Bed, a one act play, 2001)
- Romeo & Juliet (translation of the play by Shakespeare, 2002)
- 101 Reykjavík (2004, stage version of the novel)
- Things Are Going Great (2004, stage version of the novel)
- Love is Disco – Life is Punk (2008, musical)
- The Hitman's Guide to Housecleaning (2011, stage version of the novel, Austria)
- The Hitman's Guide to Housecleaning (2012, stage version of the novel, Germany, with Uwe Ochsenknecht)
- Konan við 1000° (The Thousand Degree Woman, 2014, stage version of the novel, Iceland)
- Konan við 1000° (The Thousand Degree Woman, 2016, stage version of the novel, Denmark)
- Othello (2016, translation of the play by Shakespeare)

=== Cartoons ===
- Best of Grim (Cartoons feat. Grim 2004)

=== Children's books ===
- Konan sem kyssti of mikið (The Woman Who Kissed Too Much, 2009)

=== Film ===
- 101 Reykjavík (2000, film version of the novel)
- Stormland (2010, film version of the novel)
- Comeback (2015, Danish film based on Hallgrímur's script)

=== Radio ===
- Radio Manhattan (1989–93, Icelandic State Radio, Ch.2)
- Art in a Cold Climate (2015, a piece for BBC Radio 3)

=== Articles ===
Hallgrímur's articles have appeared in Icelandic newspapers Þjóðviljinn, DV, Eintak, Morgunpósturinn, Fréttablaðið, The Reykjavík Grapevine, Icelandic websites Kvennablaðið and Stundin, Danish newspapers Weekendavisen and Politiken, German newspapers Die Zeit, Stuttgarter Zeitung and Frankfurter Allgemeine Zeitung, US newspaper New York Newsday, Canadian newspaper Ottawa Citizen, as well as the Croatian newspaper Jutarnji list, Italian Marie-Claire and French soccer magazine So Foot.

=== Stand-up comedy ===
- An Evening with Hallgrimur Helgason (1995, fifteen shows at The Café Theatre, Reykjavík)
