= Oddaverjar =

Medieval Icelandic clan

The Oddaverjar (Old Norse: [ˈodːɑˌwerjɑz̠]; Modern Icelandic: [ˈɔtːaˌvɛrjar̥]) were a powerful family clan in the medieval Icelandic Commonwealth. They were based in Oddi at Rangárvellir in South Iceland. Their ascendancy was during the second half of the 12th century, but their power subsequently waned. They play only a minor role in the Icelandic civil war during the Age of the Sturlungs. Only after the signing of the Gamli sáttmáli ("Old Covenant") did they oppose the influence of Gissur Þorvaldsson, Earl of Iceland.

The Oddverjar traced their roots to the first Icelandic settlers. The first known Oddaverji was Sæmundur Sigfússon fróði ("Sæmundur The Knowledgeable"), an early 12th century scholar.

== See also ==
- Oddaverjaannáll
