= Arnór Sighvatsson =

Icelandic economist

Arnór Sighvatsson (born 2 February 1956) is an Icelandic economist. From February 2009 to July 2018, he served as the Deputy Governor of the Central Bank of Iceland.

== Education ==
Sighvatsson received the Ph.D. degree in economics from Northern Illinois University, DeKalb, Illinois, USA in 1990. Earlier, he received the M.A. degree from the same university and a B.A. degree in history and philosophy from the University of Iceland in Reykjavík.

== Career ==
Sighvatsson worked at the Statistics Office of Iceland from 1988 to 1989. He was an economist, Head of Unit, Deputy to the Chief Economist of the Central Bank from 1995 to 2004, when he became the Chief Economist and Director of the Economics Department. He was Deputy Director of the Nordic-Baltic Office of the International Monetary Fund from 1993 to 1995.
