= Sæmundr fróði =

Icelandic priest and scholar (1056–1133)

- Born: 1056; Iceland
- Died: 1133 (aged 76–77); Iceland
- Occupation(s): Priest, scholar

Sæmundr Sigfússon, better known as Sæmundr fróði (Sæmundr the Learned; 1056–1133), was an Icelandic priest and scholar.

== Biography ==
Sæmundr is known to have studied abroad. Previously it has generally been held that he studied in France, but modern scholars rather believe his studies were carried out in Franconia. In Iceland he founded a long-lived school at Oddi. He was a member of the Oddaverjar clan and was the father of Loftur Sæmundsson.

Sæmundr wrote a work, probably in Latin, on the history of Norwegian kings. The work is now lost but was used as a source by later authors, including Snorri Sturluson. The poem Nóregs konungatal summarizes Sæmundr's work. The authorship of the Poetic Edda, or, more plausibly, just the editor's role in the compilation, was traditionally attributed to Sæmundr - Bishop Brynjulf asked in 1641 "Where now are those huge treasuries of all human knowledge written by Saemund the Wise, and above all that most noble Edda"? - but is not accepted today. It has been demonstrated by Svend Ellehøj that Sæmundr wrote in Latin a work that influenced highly on Nóregs konungatal, and the Saga of Óláfr Tryggvason by Oddr Snorrason.

== Icelandic folklore ==
In Icelandic folklore, Sæmundr is a larger-than-life character who repeatedly tricks the Devil into doing his bidding. For example, in one famous story Sæmundr made a pact with the Devil that the Devil should carry him home to Iceland from Europe in the form of a seal. Sæmundr escaped a diabolical end when, on arrival, he hit the seal on the head with the Bible, and stepped safely ashore.

Although the above is a commonly told story about Sæmundr and his association with the Black School (Svartiskóli or Svartaskóli ), there are several others. In one account, Sæmundr sailed abroad to learn the Dark Arts, but there was no schoolmaster present. Every time the students requested information regarding the arts, books about the subject would be provided the next morning or otherwise be written up on the walls. Above the entrance to the school, it was written: "You may come in; your soul is lost." There was also a law that forbade anyone to study at the school for more than three years. Whenever the students left in a given year, they had to leave at the same time. The devil would keep the last one remaining, and so they always drew lots to determine who would be the last one to leave. On more than one occasion the lot fell on Sæmundr, and so he remained longer than the law permitted. One day, Bishop Jón was traveling through Rome and passed nearby. He found out that Sæmundr was trapped in the Black School, so he offered him advice on how to escape as long as he returned to Iceland and behaved as a good Christian. Sæmundr agreed, but as he and Bishop Jón were leaving the school, the Devil reached up and grabbed Bishop Jón's cloak. Bishop Jón escaped, but the Devil trapped Sæmundr and made him a deal—if Sæmundr could hide for three days, he would be able to return to Iceland. Ultimately, Sæmundr was successful in hiding, and he presumably returned.

Another account explains that when Sæmundr left the Black School, he sewed a leg of mutton into his cloak, and he followed the rushing group out of the doors. When Sæmundr was near the exit, the Devil reached up to grab his cloak but only grabbed the leg that was sewn into the clothing. Sæmundr then dropped the cloak and ran, saying: "He grabbed, but I slipped away!".
