= Oddi =

Village and church in southwest Iceland

Coordinates: 63°46′00″N 20°23′56″W

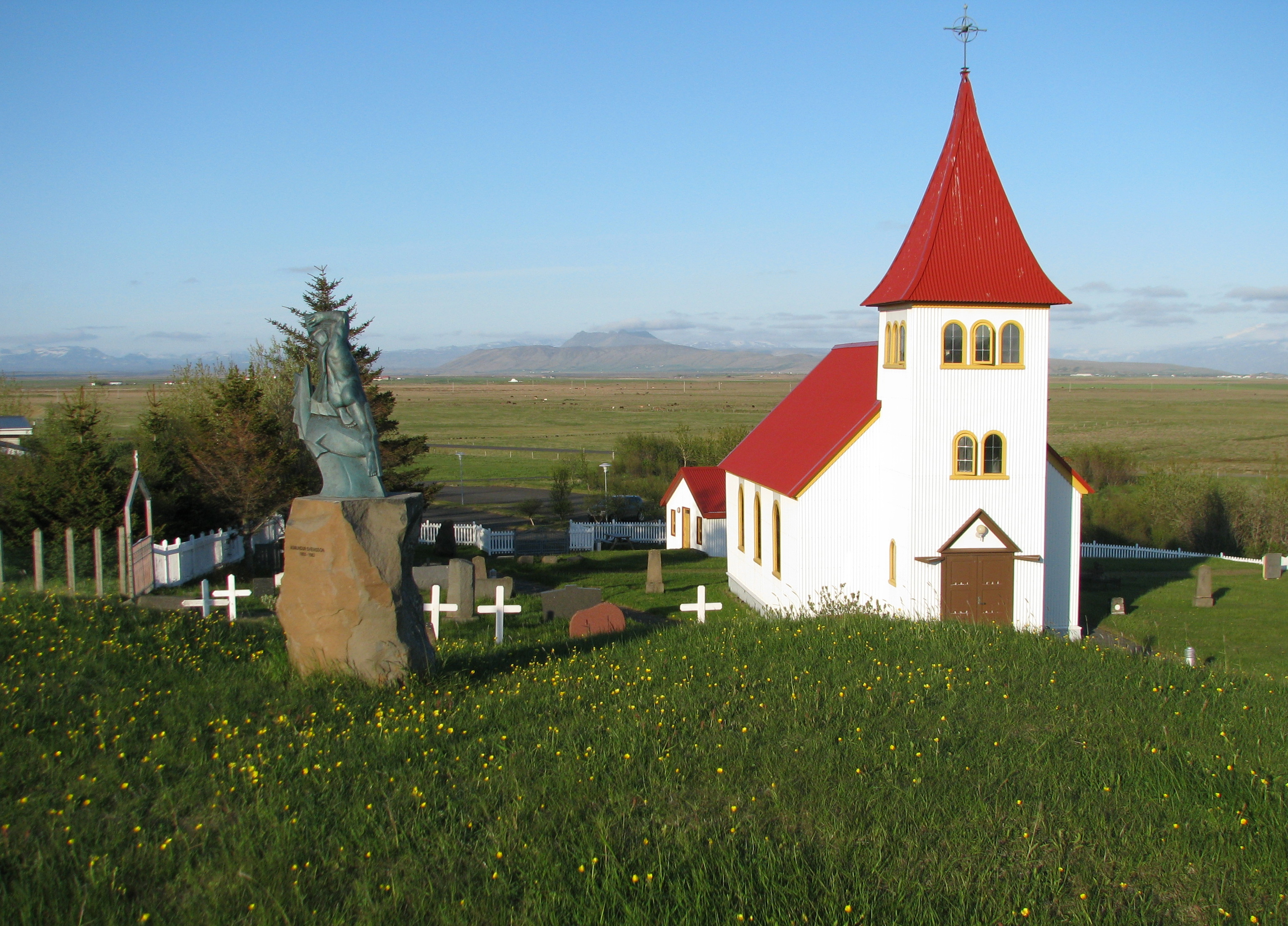
Oddi Church (2012)

Oddi (Icelandic: [ˈɔtːɪ]) is a small village and church at Rangárvellir in Rangárvallasýsla, Iceland. Oddi at Rangárvellir was a cultural and learning center in South Iceland during the Middle Ages. There has been a church at Oddi since the introduction of Christianity. The current church at Oddi dates from 1924.

For centuries, Oddi (Old Norse: [ˈodːe]) was the central home of the powerful family, Oddaverjar. The two best known leaders in Oddi were Sæmundur Sigfússon the Learned (1056–1133) and his grandson Jón Loftsson (1124–1197). The historian Snorri Sturluson (1178–1241) was brought up and educated in Oddi by Jón Loftsson. It has been suggested that the name of the Edda is derived from Oddi.

Iceland's patron saint Þorlákur Þórhallsson received his education at Oddi from the age of nine (1142–1147) and looked upon the priest Eyjólfur Saemundsson as his foster-father. Þorlákur received Holy Orders in the Diaconate at the age of fifteen and then the Catholic priesthood at age eighteen.
