= Agnar Helgason =

Icelandic scientist

Agnar Helgason (born 31 July 1968 in Reykjavík) is an Icelandic scientist working with genetic anthropology. PhD in Biological Anthropology, University of Oxford, 2001. He is best known for his research on the origin of Icelandic population. He is a brother of Ásgeir Helgason, the son of Helgi Valdimarsson and a brother-in-law of Tim Moore (writer).

== Sources and links ==
- "DNA tests debunk blond Inuit legend". CBC News. 2003-10-28.

Search Results for author Helgason A on PubMed.
