= Geysir =

Geyser in Iceland

- Geyser
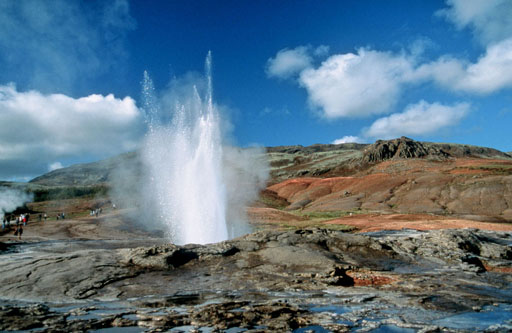
- The Great Geysir erupting in 2000

- Location within Iceland
- Coordinates: 64°18′49″N 20°17′58″W
- Location: Southwestern Iceland
- Elevation: 110 m (360 ft)
- Volcanic zone: West volcanic zone of Iceland

Geysir (Icelandic pronunciation: [ˈceiːsɪr̥]), sometimes known as The Great Geysir, is a geyser in south-western Iceland that geological studies suggest started forming about 1150 CE. The English word geyser (a periodically spouting hot spring) derives from Geysir. The name itself comes from the Icelandic verb geysa ("to gush"). Geysir lies in the Haukadalur valley on the slopes of Laugarfjall lava dome, which is also the home to Strokkur geyser about 50 metres (160 ft) to the south. The Strokkur geyser may be confused with it, and the geothermal field it is in is known usually as either Geysir or Haukadalur.

Eruptions at Geysir can typically hurl boiling water up to 60 m (200 ft) into the air. However, eruptions are nowadays infrequent, and have in the past stopped altogether for many years at a time.

== History ==
A geyser at the general site is described in a written source by Saxo Grammaticus, as a mention in Gesta Danorum, his work finished about 1206. However the oldest definitive accounts of the hot springs at Haukadalur in their present form, date back to 1294, in the chronicle Oddaverjaannáll, when earthquakes in the area caused significant changes in local neighbouring landscape, creating several new hot springs. Changes in the activity of Geysir and the surrounding geysers are strongly related to earthquake activity. In records dated 1630, the geysers erupted so violently that the valley around them trembled. The name "Geysir" was first mentioned in written sources in 1647; as unusual natural phenomena were of great interest during the Age of Enlightenment, the term became popular and has been used for similar hydrothermal features worldwide since then.

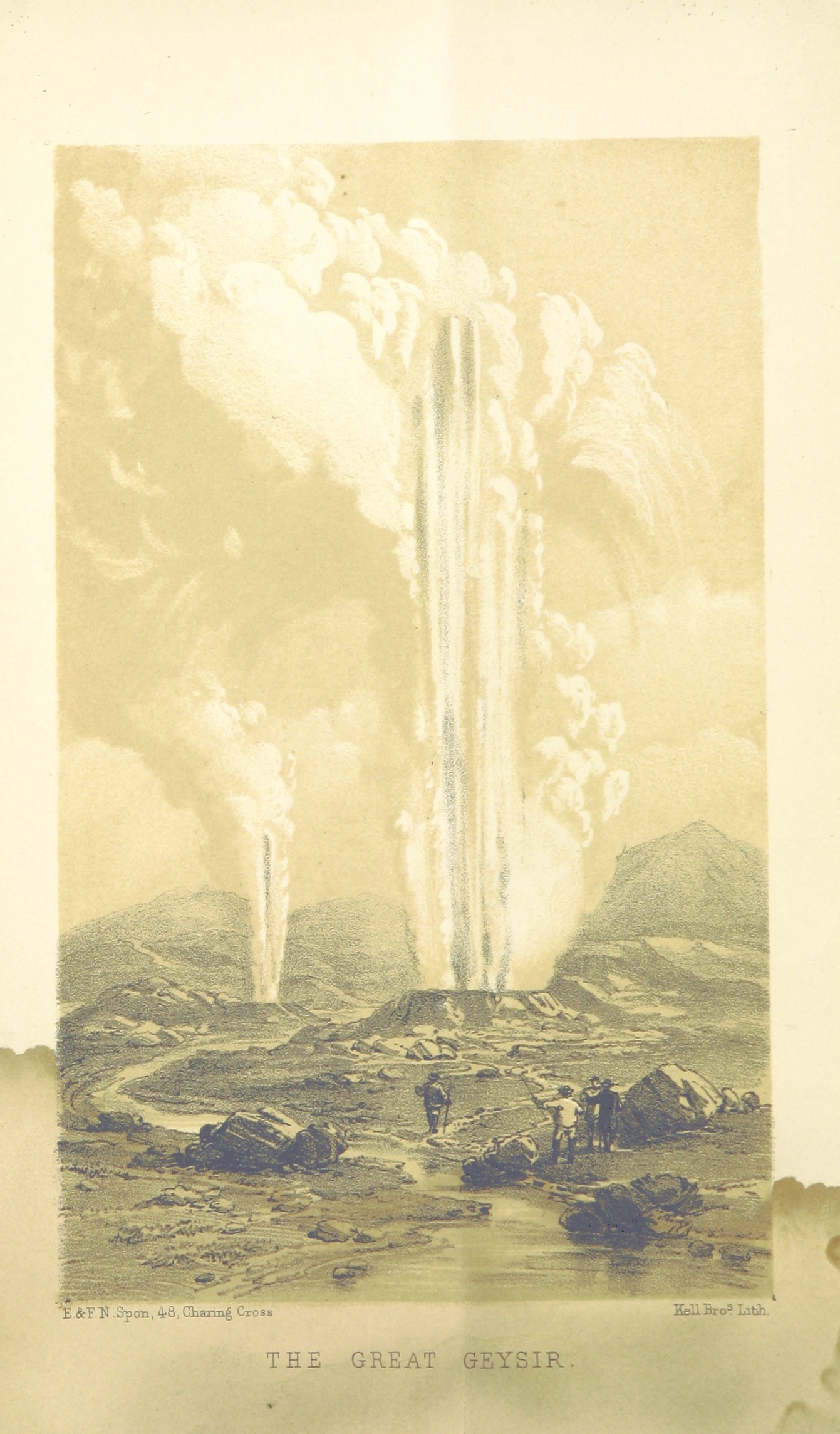
1873 drawing of Geysir

In 1809 and 1810 the eruptions were about every 30 hours and up to 30 m (100 ft) high. In 1811 George Mackenzie, a geologist, first proposed that expansion of steam in a subsurface cavity explained Geysir's activity. In 1845, it reached a height of 170 m (560 ft). In 1846, research on Geysir, and Iceland sponsored by the Danish Crown, by amongst others, the German chemist Robert Bunsen, resulted in a better general explanation of the mechanism of geyser activity which contributed significantly to the more refined models used today. Measurements by Professor Bunsen in that year showed that Geysir was erupting 45 to 54 m (148 to 177 ft) high.

In 1882 an account of the first accurate survey (previous attempts were associated with instrument problems), noted that a booming sound warned of Geysir's eruptions, eruptions were about 6 hourly but often of only 1.5 m (5 ft).

The records of recent centuries show that earthquakes have tended to revive the activity of Geysir, which then subsided again in the following years. Before 1896, Geysir was almost dormant. In that year an earthquake caused eruptions to begin again, occurring several times a day, lasting up to an hour and causing spouts of up to 70 to 80 m (230 to 260 ft) in height. In 1910, it was active every 30 minutes; by 1915, the time between the eruptions was as much as six hours, and in 1916, the eruptions all but ceased. In 1935, a man-made channel was dug through the silica rim around the edge of the geyser vent. This ditch caused a lowering of the water table and a revival in activity. Gradually this channel also became clogged with silica and eruptions again became rare.

In 1981, the ditch was cleared again and eruptions could be stimulated, on special occasions, by the addition of soap. Due to environmental concerns, soap was seldom added during the 1990s. During that time, Geysir seldom erupted. When it did erupt, it was spectacular, sending boiling water sometimes up to 70 m (230 ft) into the air. On the Icelandic National Day, authorized government geologists would force an eruption. Further earthquakes in 2000 revived the geyser, and it reached 122 m (400 ft) for two days., thus becoming one of the highest known geysers in history. Waimangu Geyser in New Zealand typically erupted higher than this, up to 460 m (1,510 ft) high, but it stopped all activity around 1908. Initially, Geysir eruptions were taking place on average eight times a day. By July 2003, this activity had again decreased to around three times per day. Large eruptions after this became so rare that one in 2016 was considered newsworthy.

== Geology ==
Approximate map of: Surface thermal features of Haukadalur valley geothermal area as of 2016 Laugarfjall lava dome Selected geothermal features Mouse over is enabled on clicking the map.

A current geological definition of a hot water geyser is "…a hot spring characterized by intermittent discharge of water ejected turbulently and accompanied by a vapor phase" which is a technical correction of historic definitions that mention steam and a column in air. Geysir is technically a hot water pool geyser rather than a cone geyser so much heat is lost to the atmosphere explaining why the maximum temperature in its conduit is several meters below the top of the water column rather than at the top like is the case with Old Faithful. Geysir's funnel like surface conduit has a diameter of between 0.4 to 1.0 m (1.3 to 3.3 ft) and until a narrow constriction a depth of about 23 m (75 ft). In the conduit above 10 m (33 ft) the geyser has a temperature between 85 to 95 °C (185 to 203 °F) and reaches higher temperatures of about 120 °C (220 °F) below this. The conduit in this higher temperature region is more constricted and irregular than earlier studies could ascertain, and fracture related, with potential for the boiling temperature to be reached. Below 16 m (52 ft) the conduit has several branches and cavities. As it is closer to sea level than most of the world's 1,000 odd geysers the actual erupted water temperature is higher than most.

The 3 km^{2} (1.2 sq mi) Haukadalur volcanic system, which provides the heat, is mainly to the west of Geysir but has not been active volcanically for over 10,000 years. Geysir is on the eastern slopes of the rhyolitic Laugarfjall lava dome, but the hyaloclastite nature of the rock that the water erupts through, may be important in its fracture network. It is now known that the areas of thermal activity of the geothermal field align along microfractures that became seismologically active after the 2000 Iceland earthquakes.

The geothermal water source may be the southern Langjökull ice sheet, about 50 km (30 mi) to the north.

Research on the deposits of sinter, formed from the dissolved minerals in the hot water, shows that hot springs at the Geysir location have been active for approximately 10,000 years. However before Geysir became active as a definitive geyser the previous deposits were covered with tephra from Katla and Hekla, and little sinter was deposited for about 2,000 years. Once Geysir became active, precipitation of opal from the geothermal water lead to a siliceous sinter apron around the geyser. This has allowed formation of the modern geyser to be dated to about 1150 CE which accords with the history of written mention above.

== Nearby geysers ==
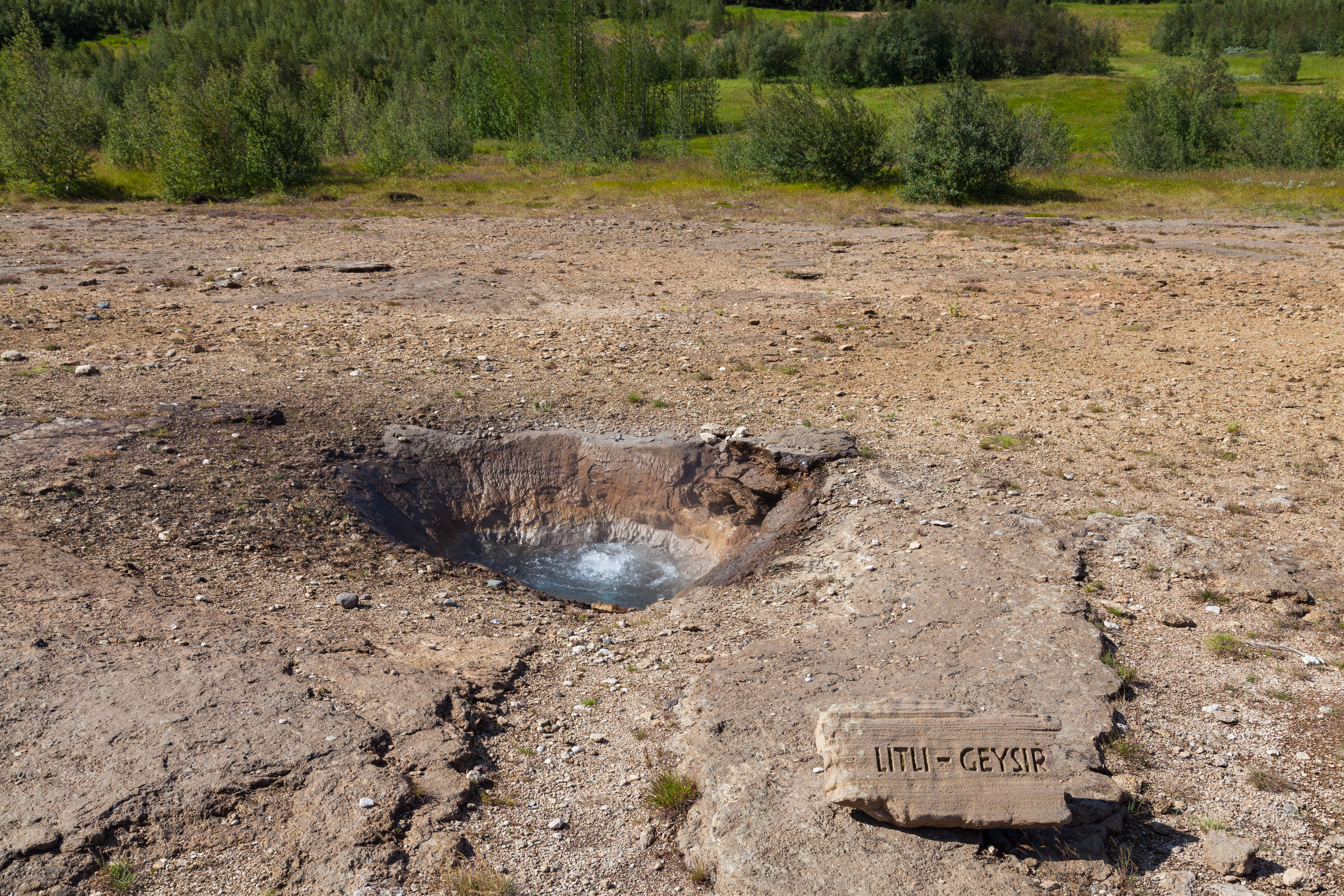
Little Geysir

The nearby geyser Strokkur erupts much more frequently than Geysir, erupting to heights of up to 35 m (115 ft) every few minutes. Strokkur was first described in 1789. There is contrast in its lack of warning of eruption with the case of Geysir and evidence that the plumbing might not be totally independent. Strokkur's conduit has also been mapped in detail and is pipe shaped to 8 m (26 ft), where it narrows before expanding into a cavity at about 11 m (36 ft) before narrowing again into a fracture configuration at about 13 m (43 ft) where temperatures become close to the boiling point. Strokkur's activity has also been affected by earthquakes, although to a lesser extent than the Great Geysir. Due to its eruption frequency, online photos and videos of Strokkur are regularly mislabelled as depicting Geysir. There are around thirty much smaller geysers and hot pools in the area, including one called Litli Geysir ('Little Geysir'). Detailed thermal mapping of the geothermal field has revealed 364 distinct hot areas.

Descriptions of the Great Geysir and Strokkur have been given in many travel guides to Iceland published from the 18th century onwards. Together with Þingvellir and the Gullfoss waterfall, they are part of the Golden Circle, the most famous tourist route in the country.

Geysir was officially protected by the Ministry for the Environment and Natural Resources on 17 June 2020.

== Ownership of the area ==
Until 1894, the Geysir area was owned by local farmers. In that year the area was sold to James Craig (later Lord Craigavon), a whiskey distiller from Ulster and a future Prime Minister of Northern Ireland. Initially, he erected large fences around the site and an entrance fee was charged for visitors wishing to view the geysers. The following year, he gave the area as a present to a friend, E. Craig, who dropped the entrance fees. Later Craig's nephew Hugh Rogers inherited the site. In 1935, he sold the site to film director Sigurður Jónasson who subsequently donated it to the Icelandic people in perpetuity, although full public ownership of all routes of access did not take place until 2017.

== Gallery ==
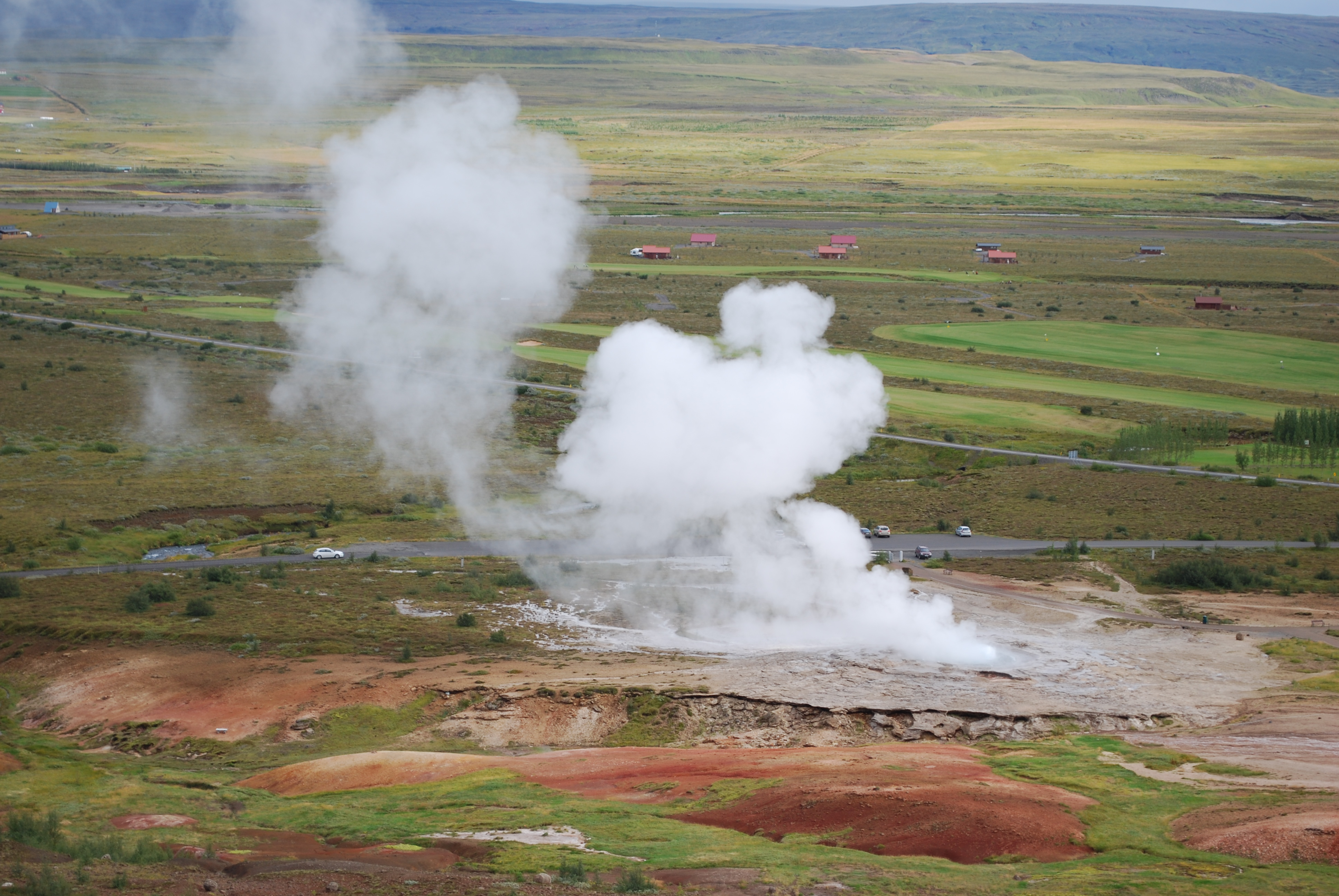
The erupting Great Geysir in summer 2009

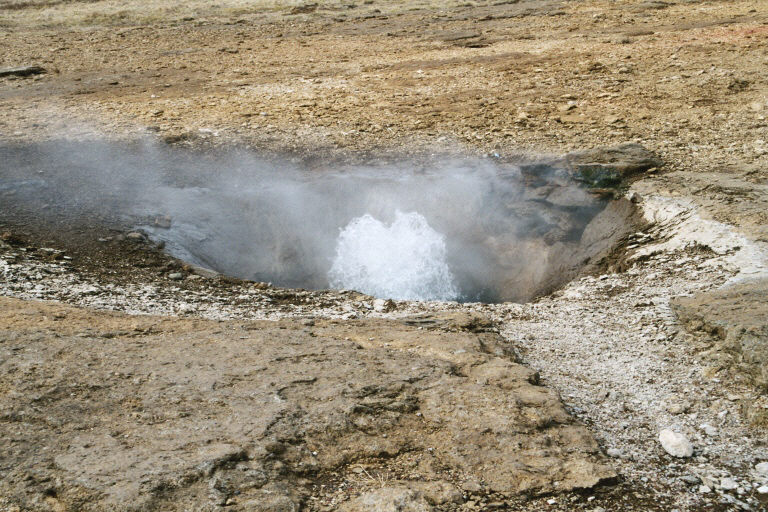
Litli Geysir erupting

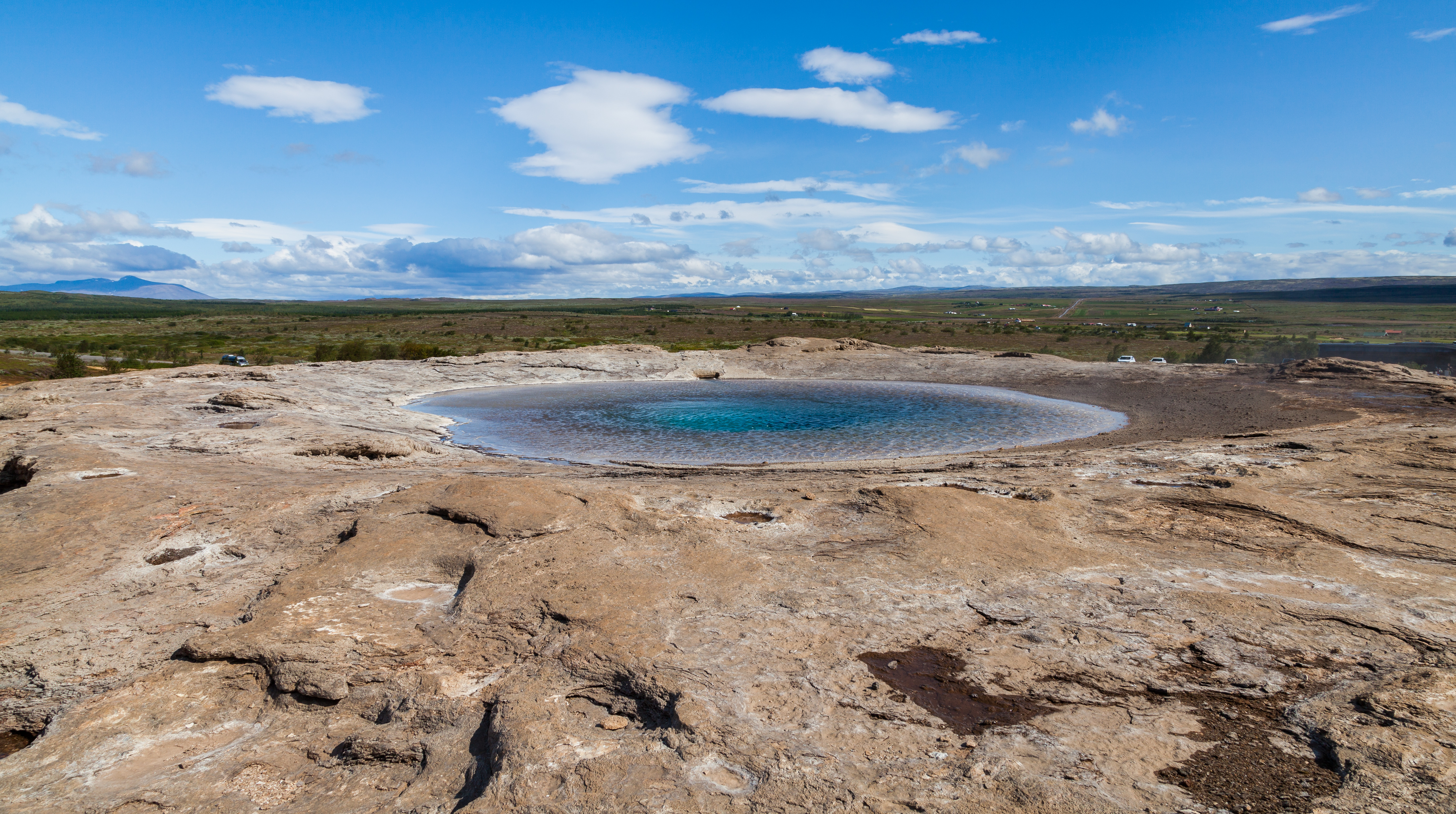
Geysir in 2014

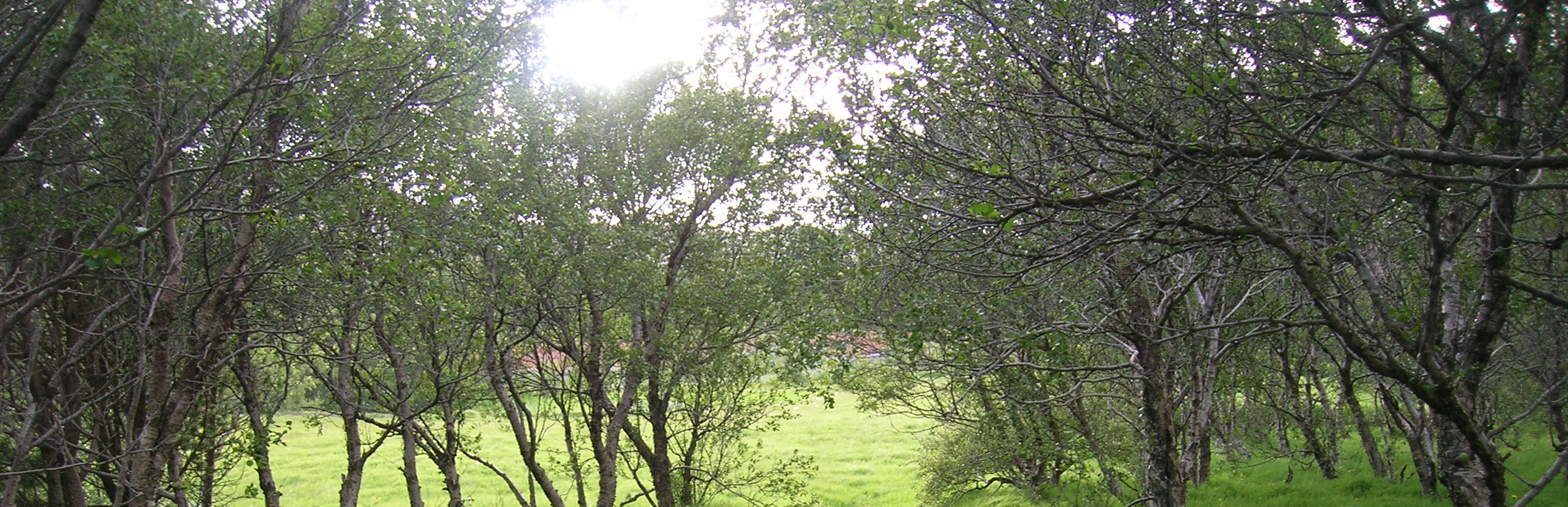
A forest near the Geysir

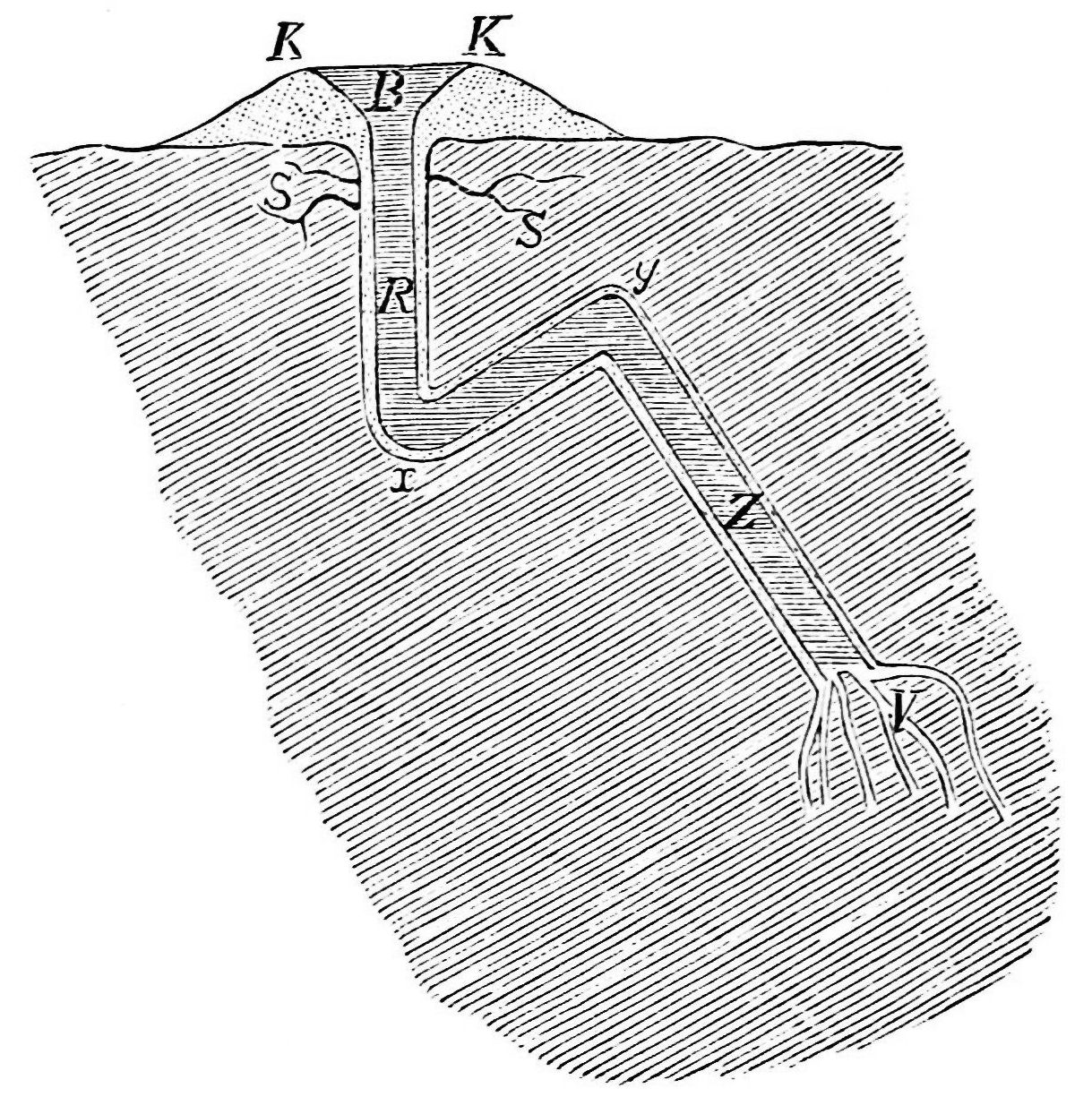
Diagram of a theoretical structure for Geysir, from 1882

== See also ==
- Strokkur
- Volcanism of Iceland
