= Strokkur =

Natural geyser located in Haukadalur Valley, Iceland

- Geyser
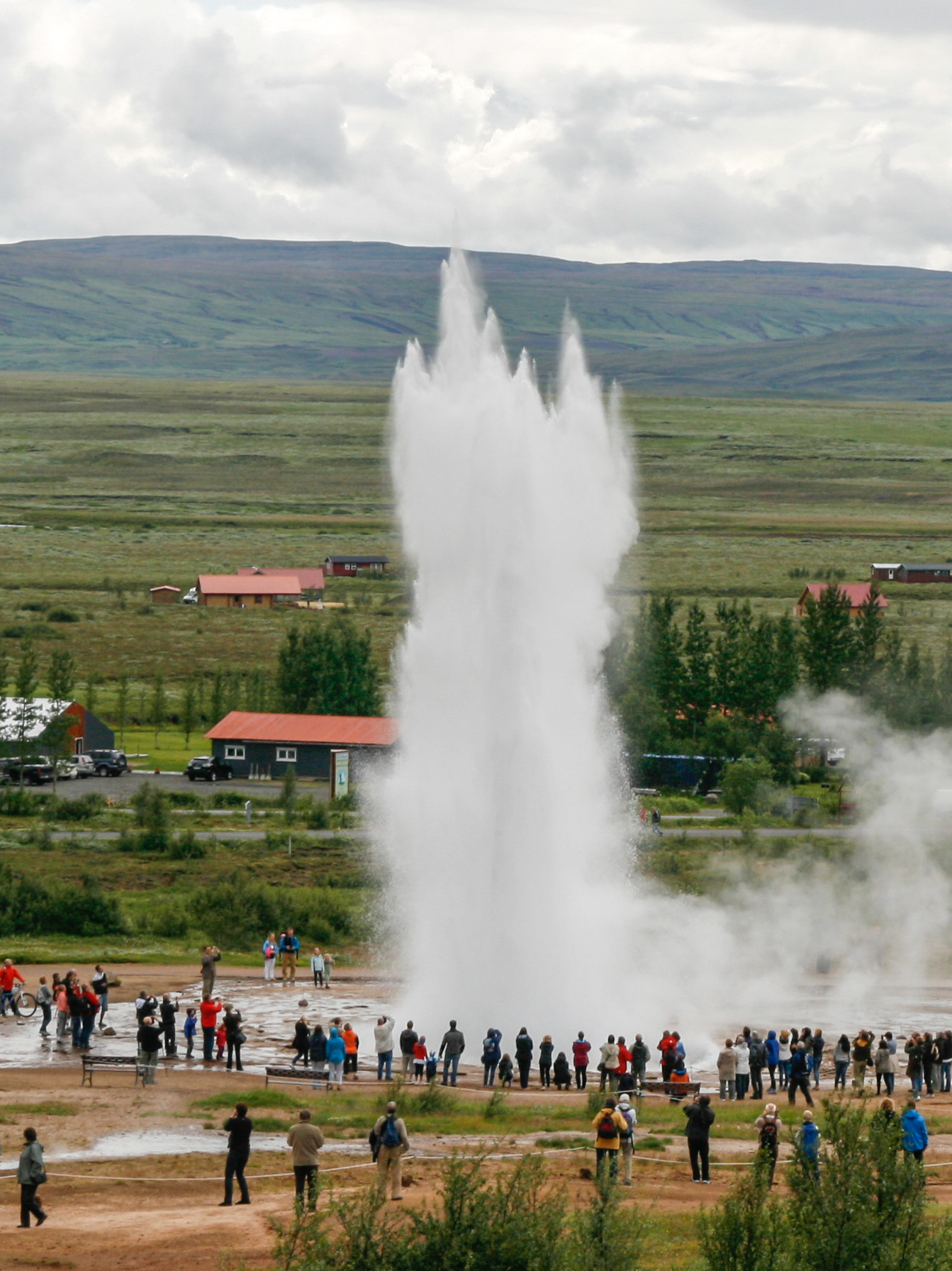
- Strokkur erupting in 2010

- Location in Iceland
- Coordinates: 64°18′47″N 20°18′2″W
- Location: Haukadalur valley, Iceland
- Elevation: 110 m (360 ft)

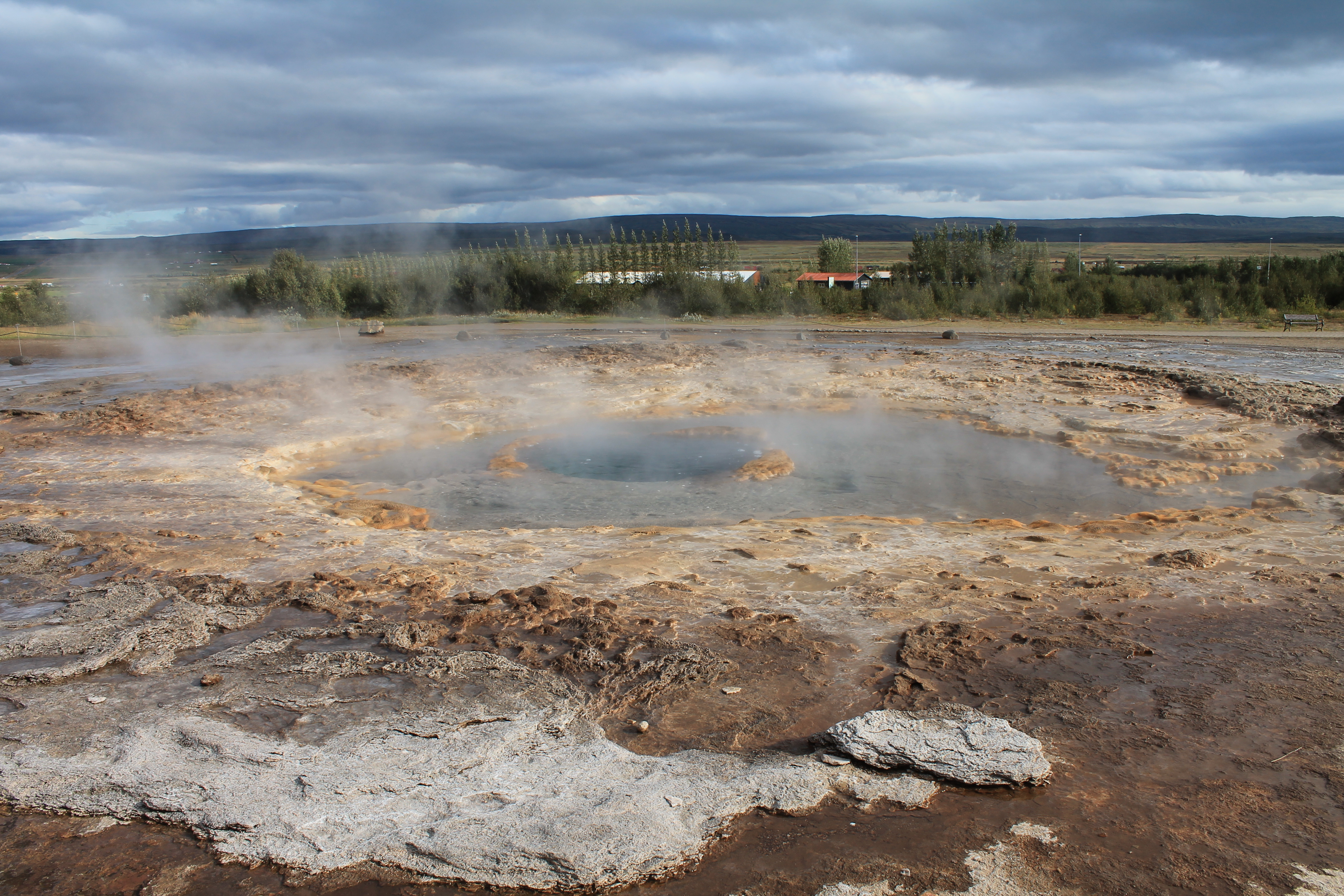
Strokkur at rest

Strokkur (Icelandic [ˈstrɔhkʏr̥], "churn") is a fountain-type geyser located in a geothermal area beside the Hvítá River in Iceland in the southwest part of the country, east of Reykjavík. It typically erupts every 6–10 minutes. Its usual height is 15–20 metres (49–66 ft), although it can sometimes erupt up to 40 metres (130 ft) high.

== Location ==
Strokkur belongs to the Haukadalur valley area, where various other geothermal feature such as mud pools, fumaroles and other geysers are located around it, such as the famous Geysir geyser, which lies only 50 metres (160 ft) to the north.

== History ==
Strokkur was first mentioned in 1789, after an earthquake helped to unblock the conduit of the geyser. Its activity fluctuated throughout the 19th century; in 1815 its height was estimated to have been as much as 60 metres (200 ft). It continued to erupt until the turn of the 20th century, when another earthquake blocked the conduit again. In 1963, upon the advice of the Geysir Committee, locals cleaned out the blocked conduit through the bottom of the basin, and the geyser has been regularly erupting ever since.

== Tourism ==
Strokkur and its surrounding areas regularly attract tourists hoping to see the geyser erupt, as it is one of a very few natural geysers to erupt frequently and reliably.

== Evolution of the eruption ==
Each frame is approximately 1/4 of a second apart, for a total of approximately two seconds:

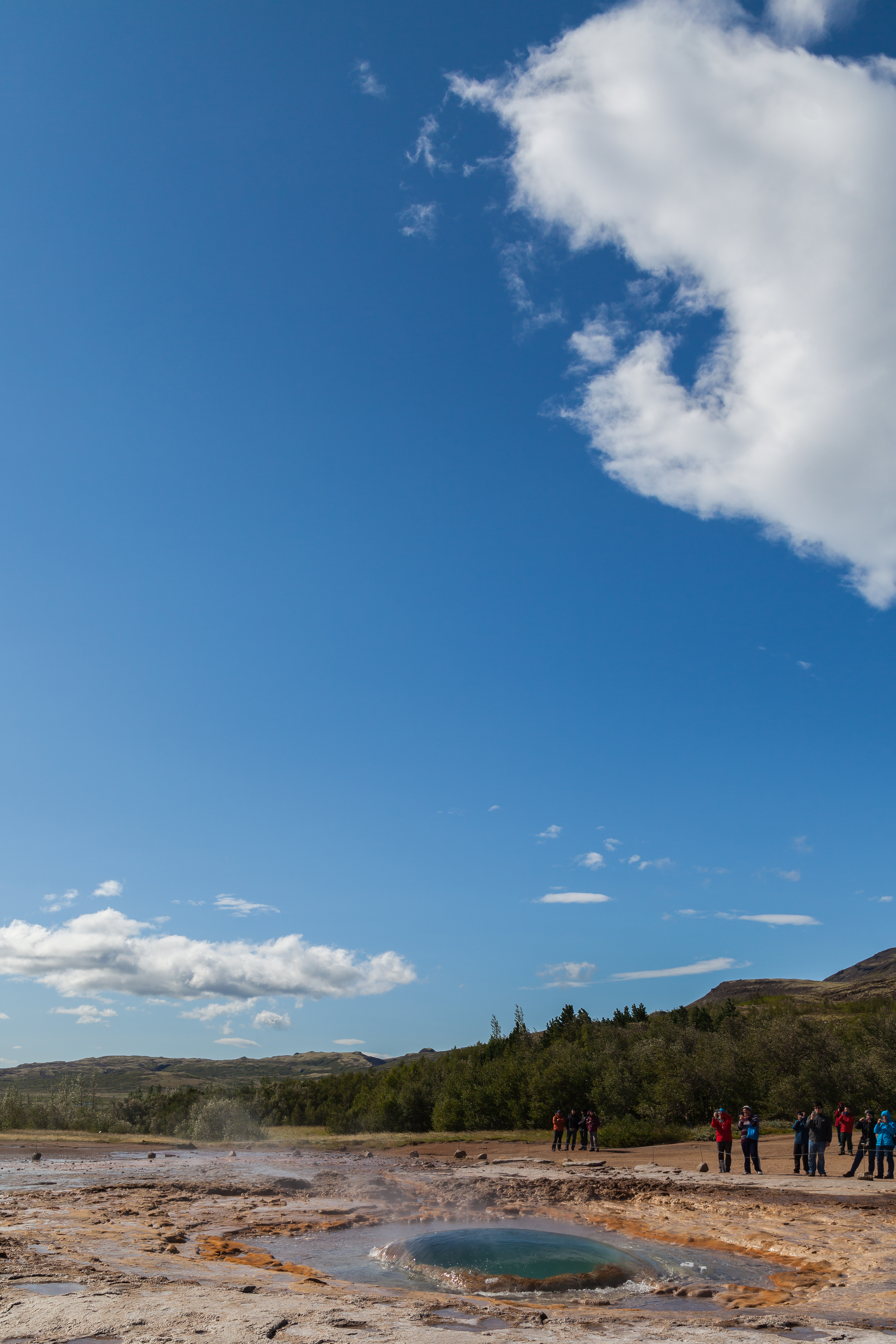

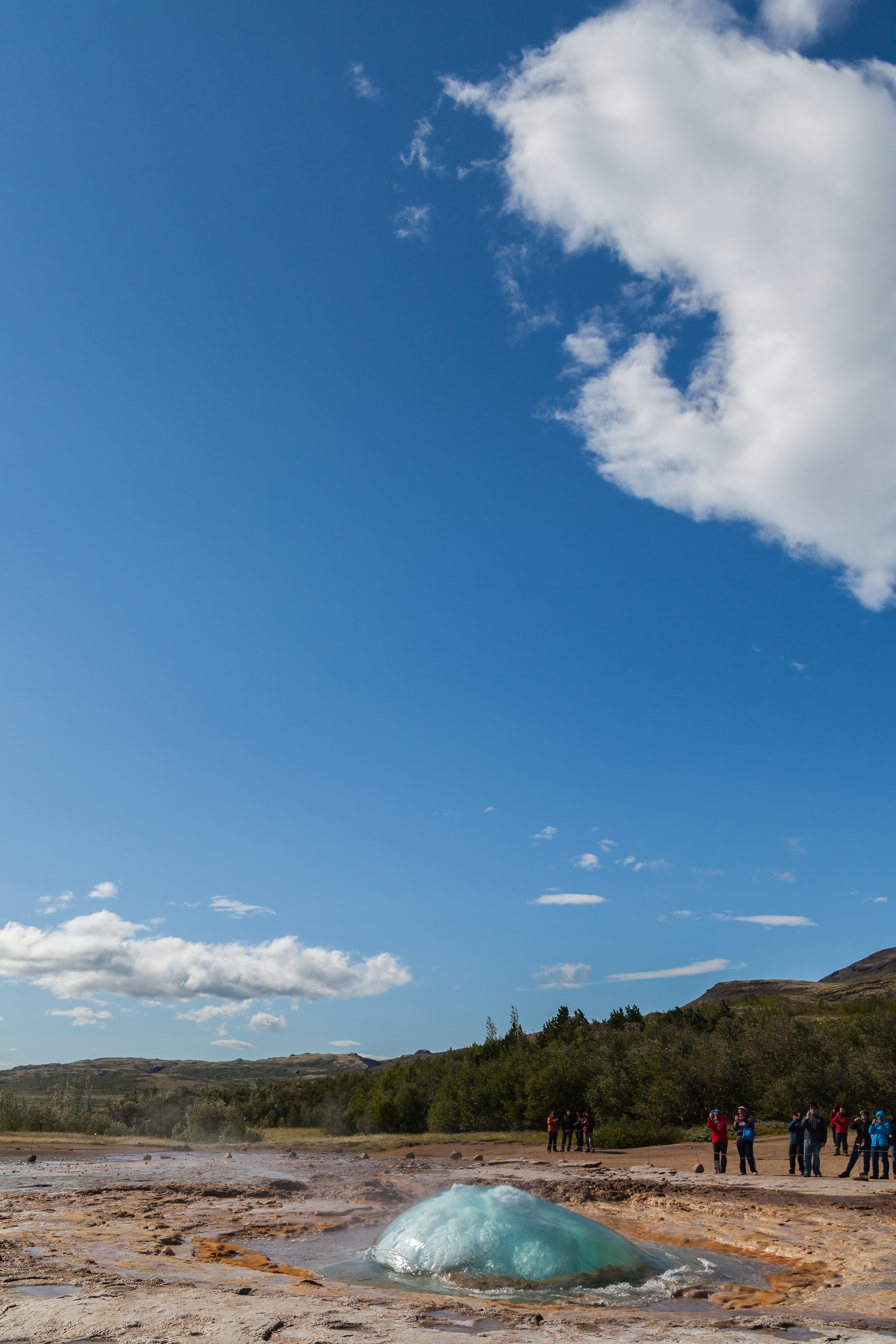

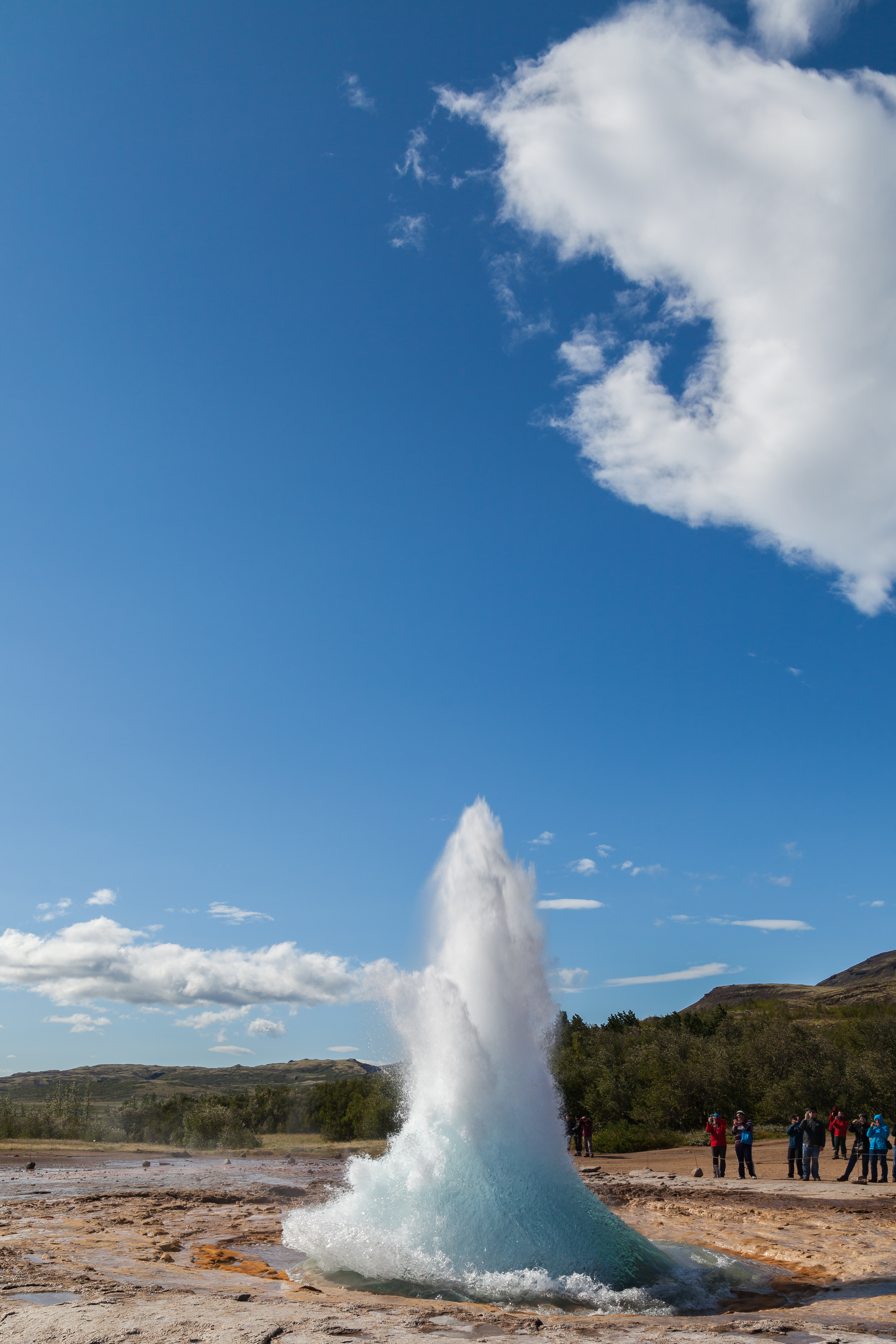

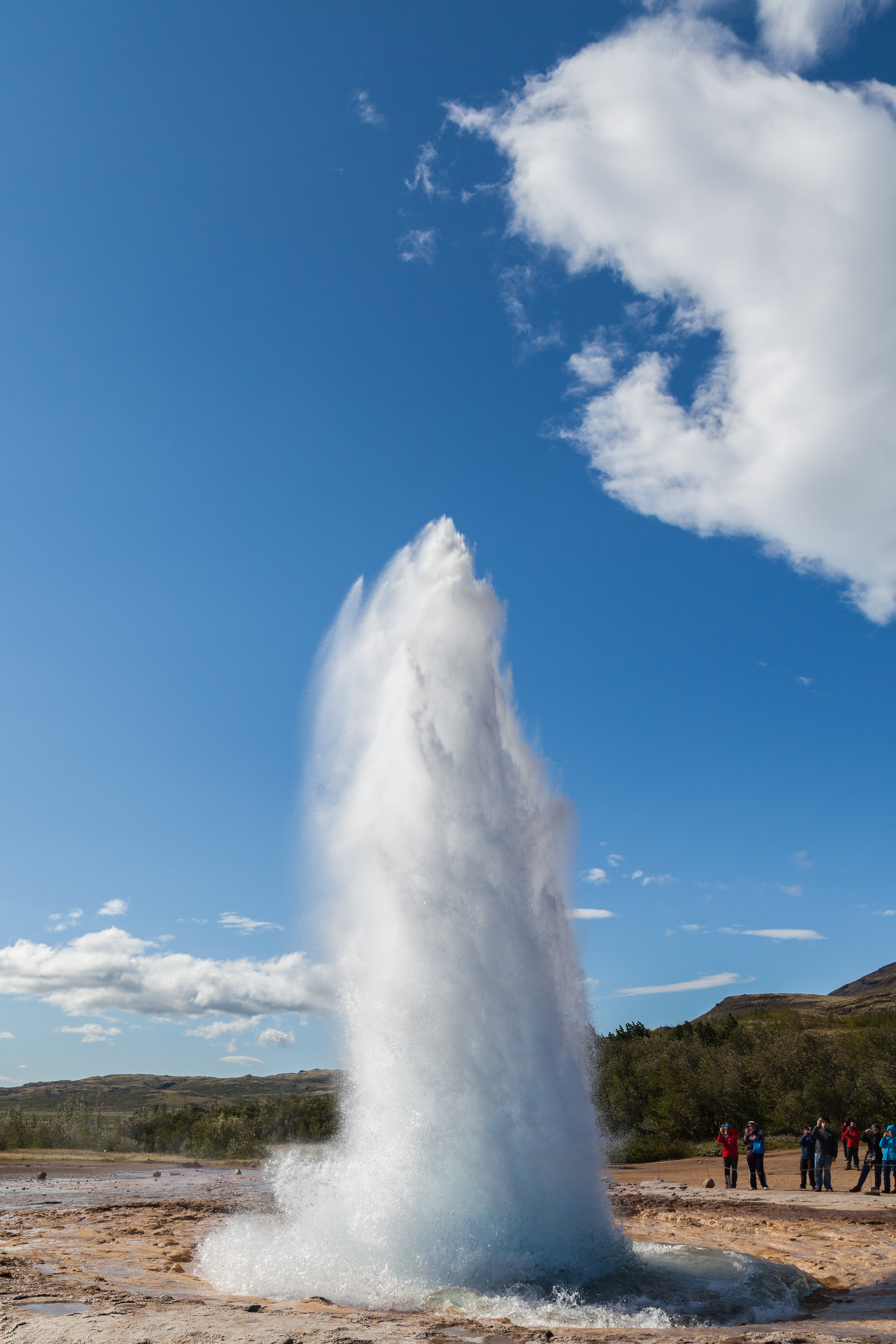

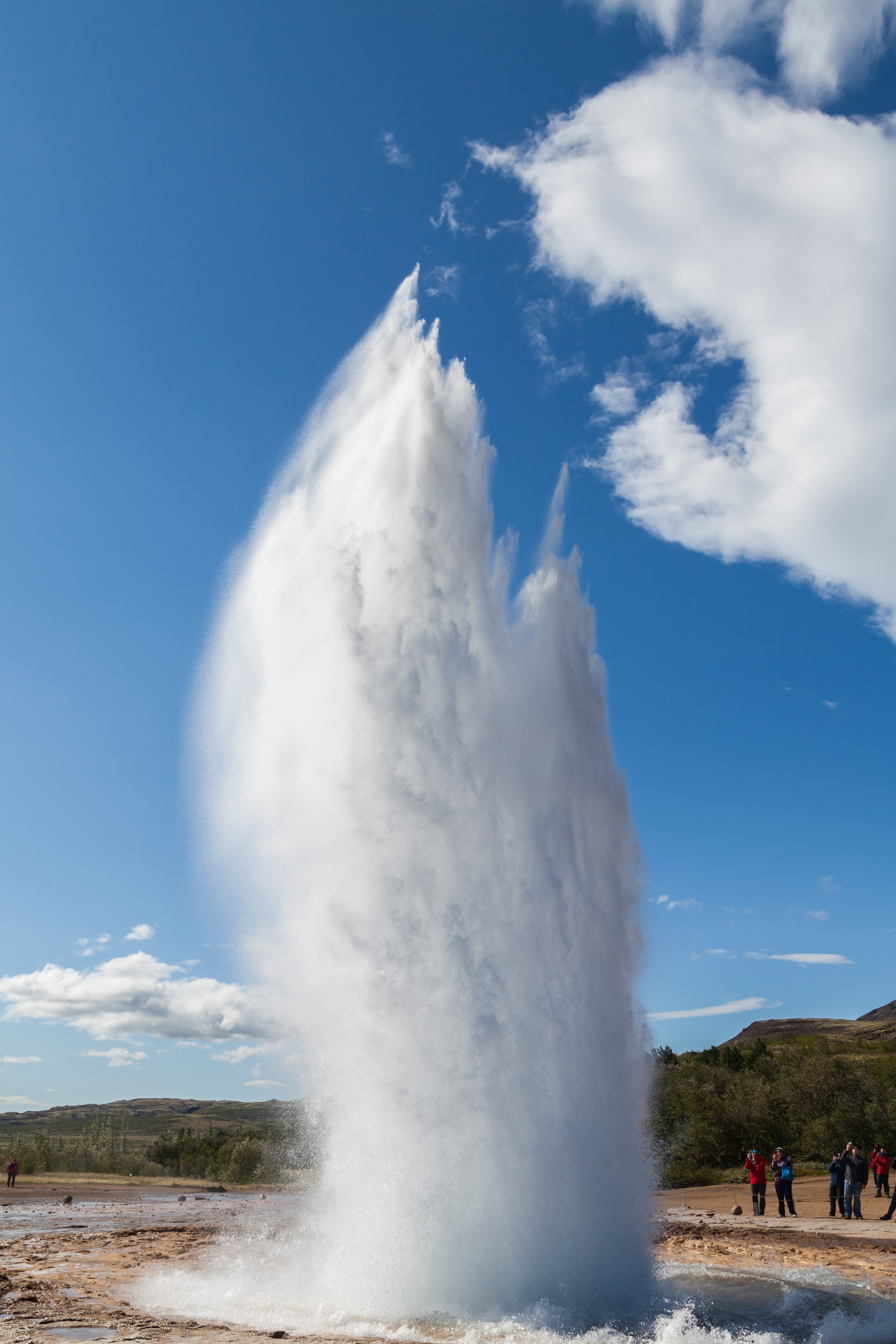

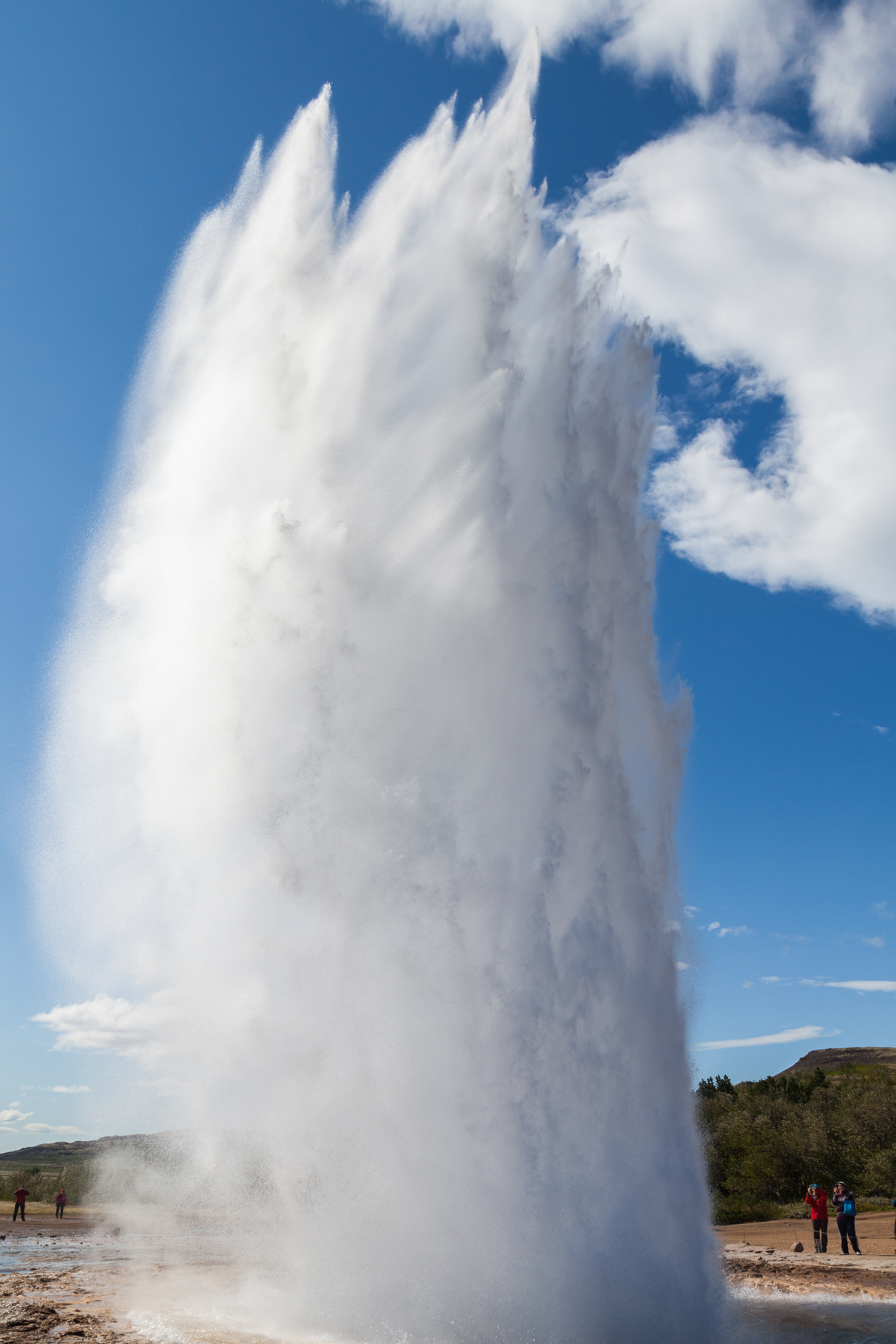

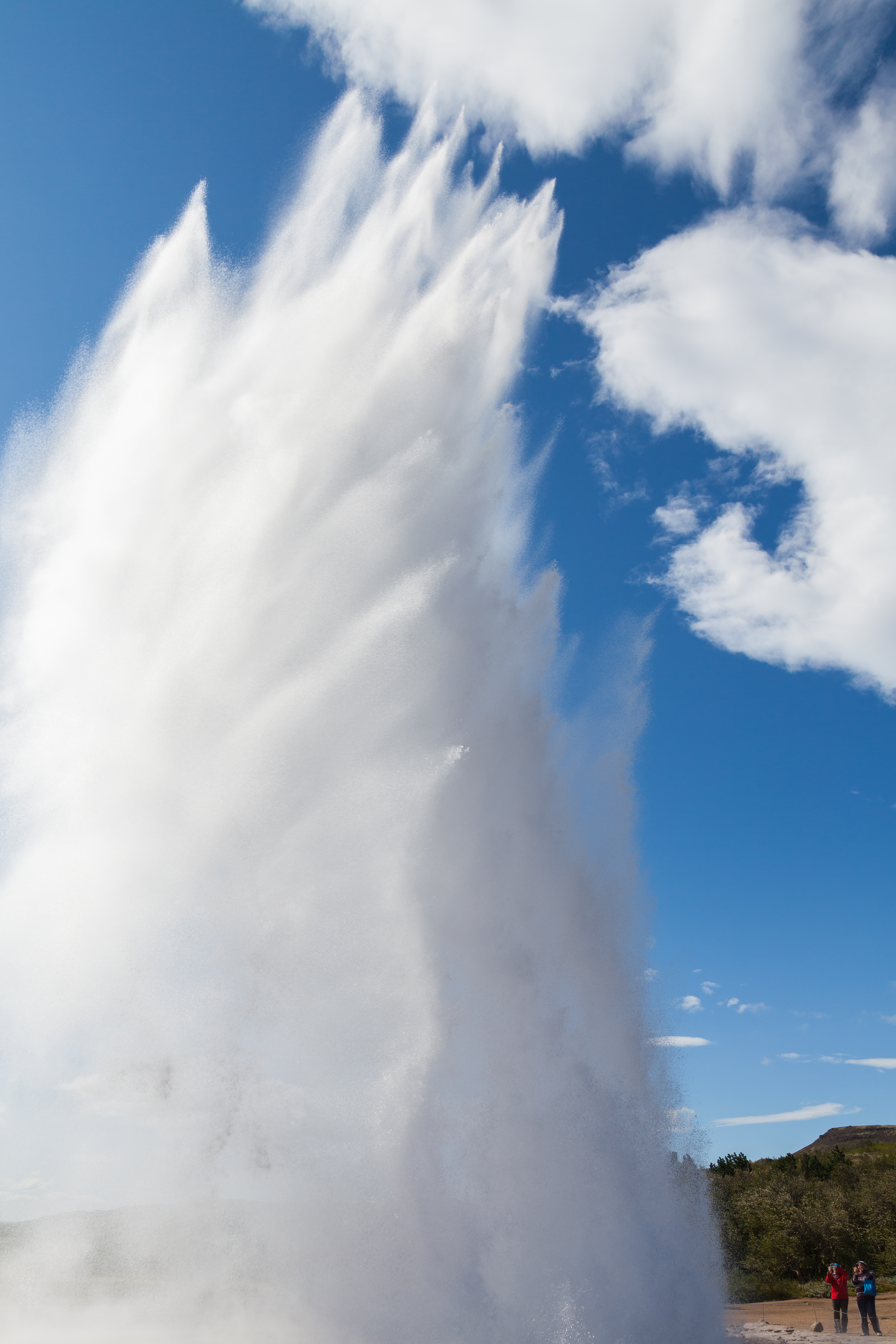

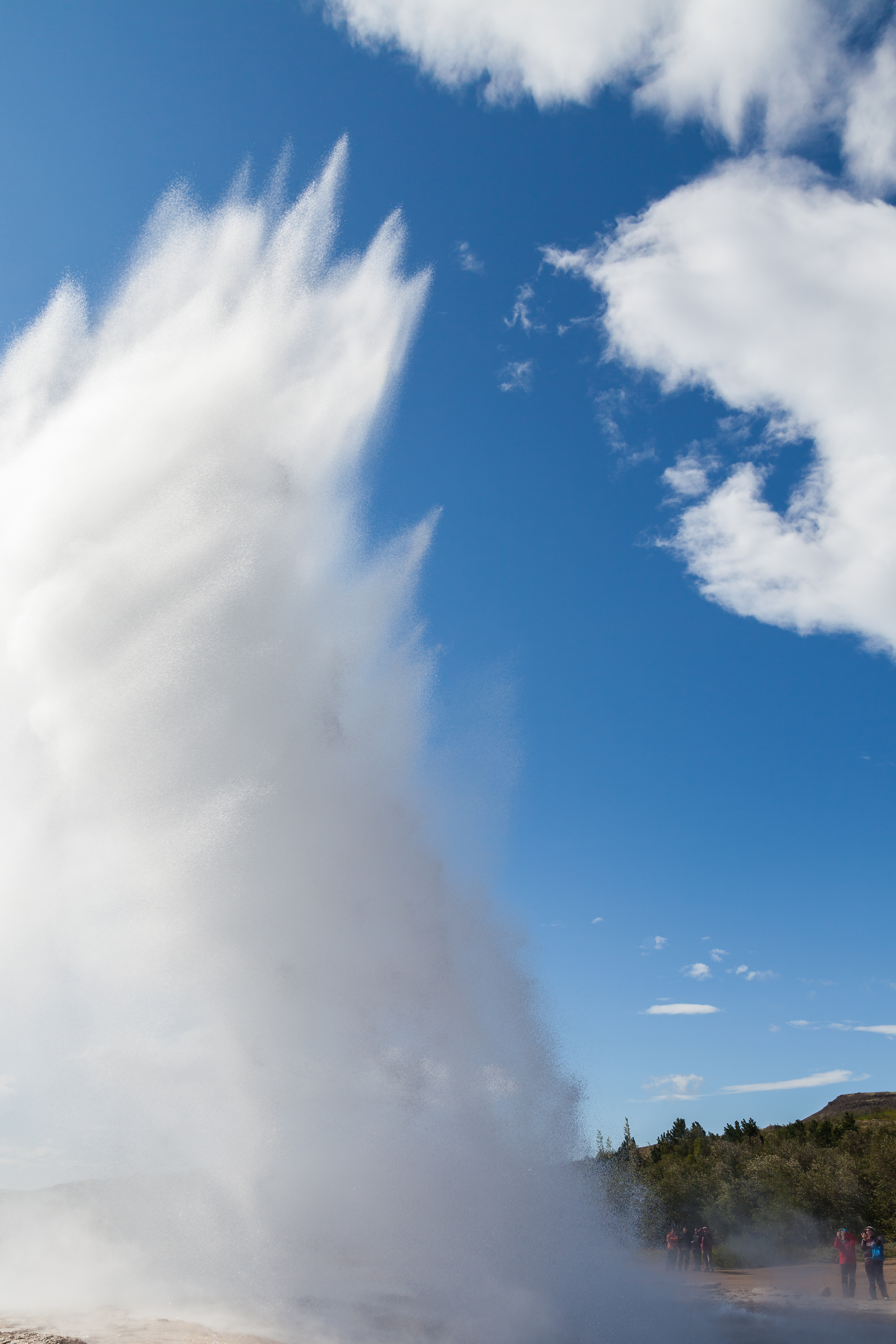

== See also ==
- Geysir, a larger more rarely erupting famous Icelandic geyser.
- Geography of Iceland
- Geology of Iceland
- Iceland plume
- List of volcanoes in Iceland
- Volcanism of Iceland
- Old Faithful, another naturally occurring geyser known for erupting frequently and predictably.
