= Haukadalur (Bláskógabyggð) =

Valley with geothermal activity in Iceland

- Valley
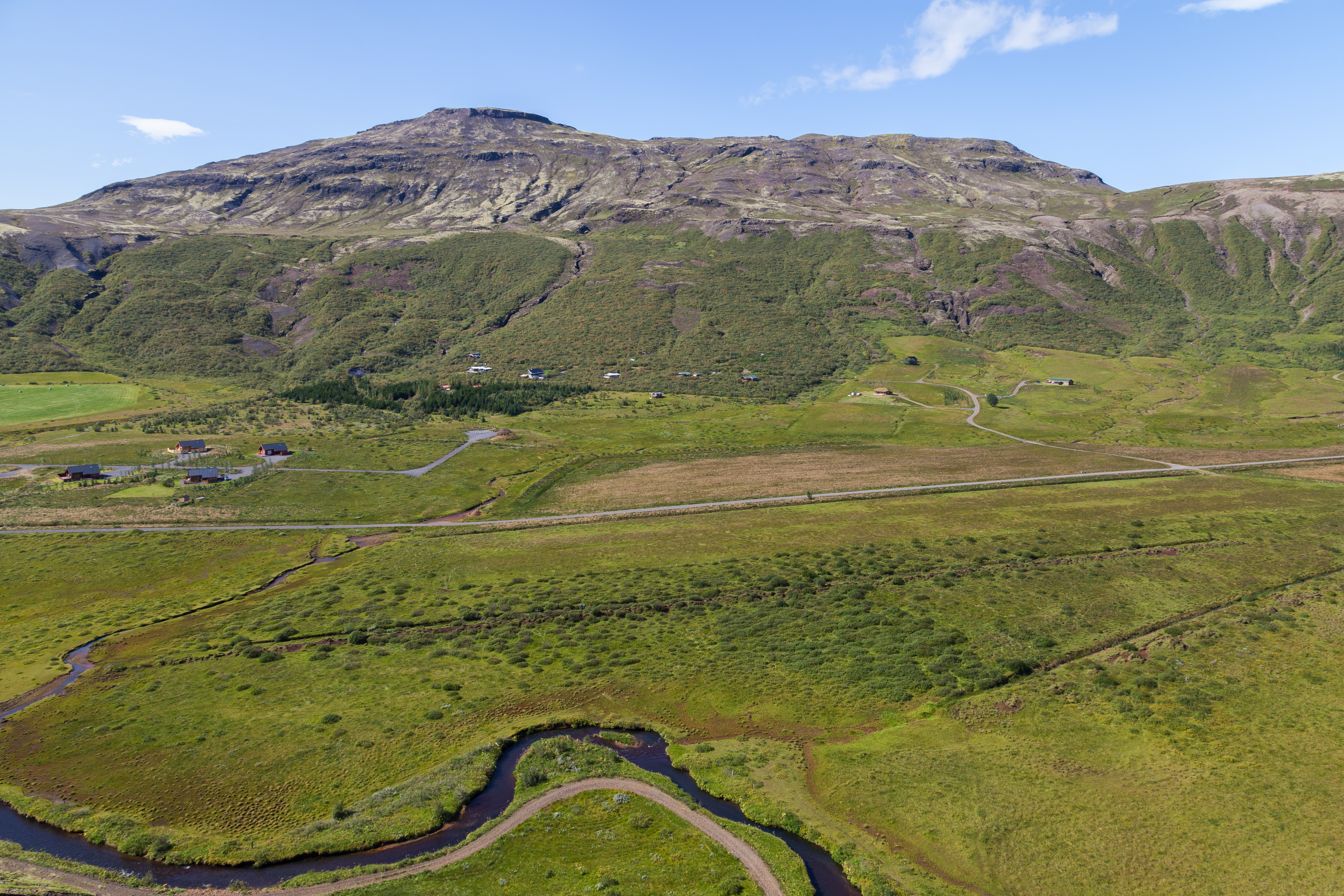
- View of the Haukadalur valley from Laugarfjall

- Location in Iceland
- Coordinates: 64°18′40″N 20°17′2″W
- Location: Southwestern Iceland

Haukadalur (Icelandic: [ˈhœyːkaˌtaːlʏr̥], from Old Norse: Haukadalr [ˈhɔukɑˌdɑlz̠], "hawk dale" or "valley of hawks") is a valley in Bláskógabyggð municipality, found in the Southern Region of Iceland. It is known for its geothermal activity and the Haukadalsskógur National Forest.

== Geography ==
The shallow valley is at about 100 m (330 ft) above sea level about 110 km (68 mi) to the north-east of Reykjavík. It lies to the north of Laugarvatn lake in the south of Iceland.

== Geology ==
There is a north-south orientated geothermal area in the valley, of about 1 km (0.62 mi) in width and about 6 km (3.7 mi) long, mainly on the eastern slopes of the rhyolite dome of Laugarfjau that is 187 m (614 ft) high. To the west of the valley is Bjarnarfell at 727 m (2,385 ft) which is a hyaloclastite ridge mainly composed of basalt and some rhyolite. To the north is a shield volcano, Sandfell at 610 m (2,000 ft), which on the valley's horizon. The volcanoes have not been active for over 10,000 years.

== Geysers ==
Haukadalur is home to some of the best known sights in Iceland: the geysers and other geothermal features which have developed on the Laugarfjall [ˈlœyːɣarˌfjatl̥] rhyolitic dome. The biggest geysers of Haukadalur are Strokkur and Geysir itself, from which the English word 'geyser' derives. Strokkur is very dependable and erupts every 4 to 10 minutes, whereas the bigger Geysir nowadays erupts very rarely. There are also more than 40 other smaller hot springs, mud pots and fumaroles nearby. The water source for the geothermal activity may originate from the southern Langjökull ice sheet, about 50 km (31 mi) to the north.

Haukadalur geothermal area was mentioned in written sources around 1294 CE, when new local hot springs were activated by earthquakes, but geothermal activity was present before this. Earthquakes are also known to have activated local geysers in the recent past, including the earthquakes that occurred on 17 and 21 July 2000. Due to the geysers the valley has been a popular tourist attraction since the 18th century.

== Nearby attractions ==
The Gullfoss waterfall is about 10 km (6.2 mi) to the north in the direction of the Highlands of Iceland, via the beginning of the Kjölur highland road. Along with Gullfoss and Þingvellir, Haukadalur is part of the Golden Circle.

== Gallery ==
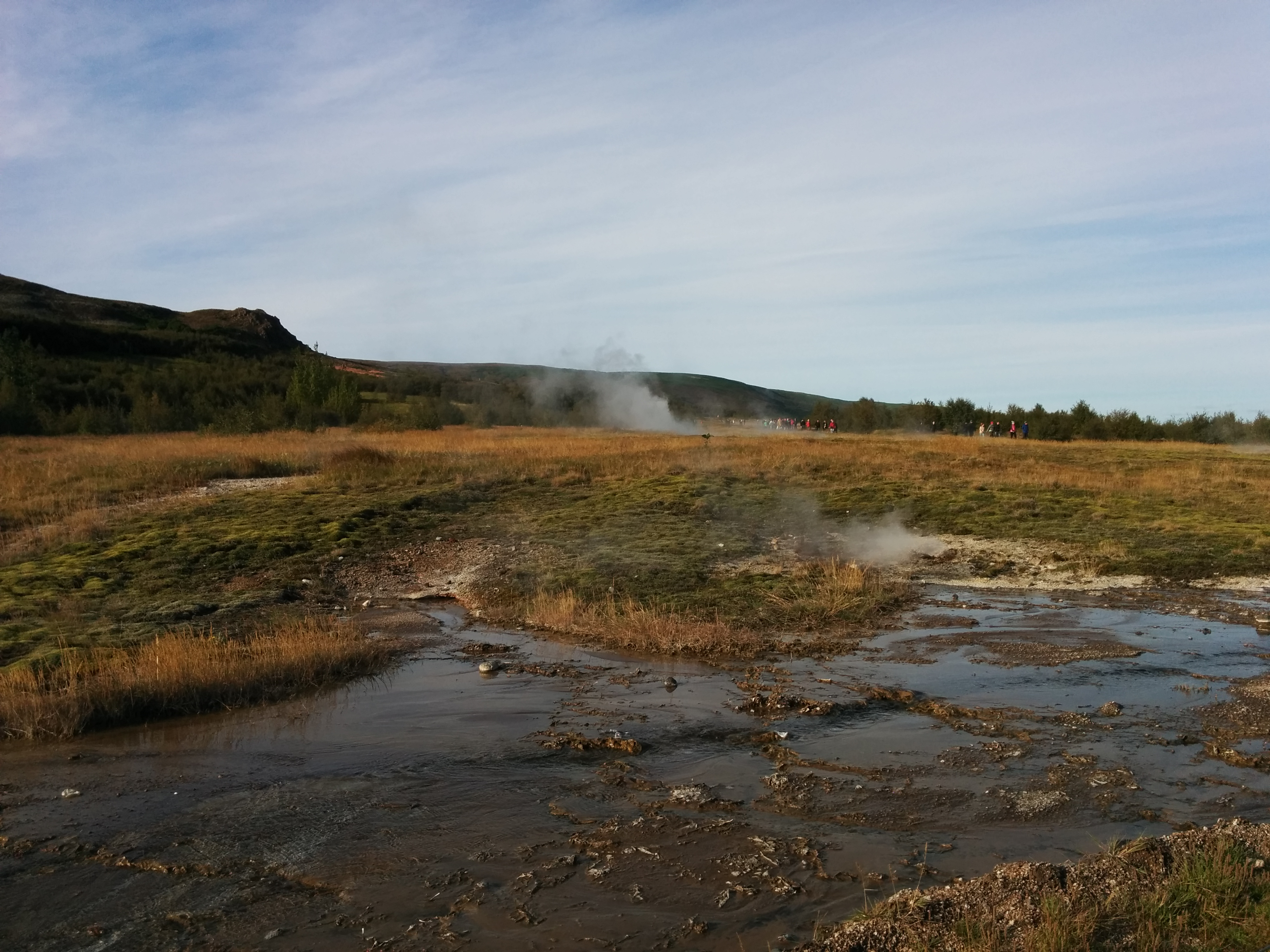
Haukadalur in September 2017, Iceland

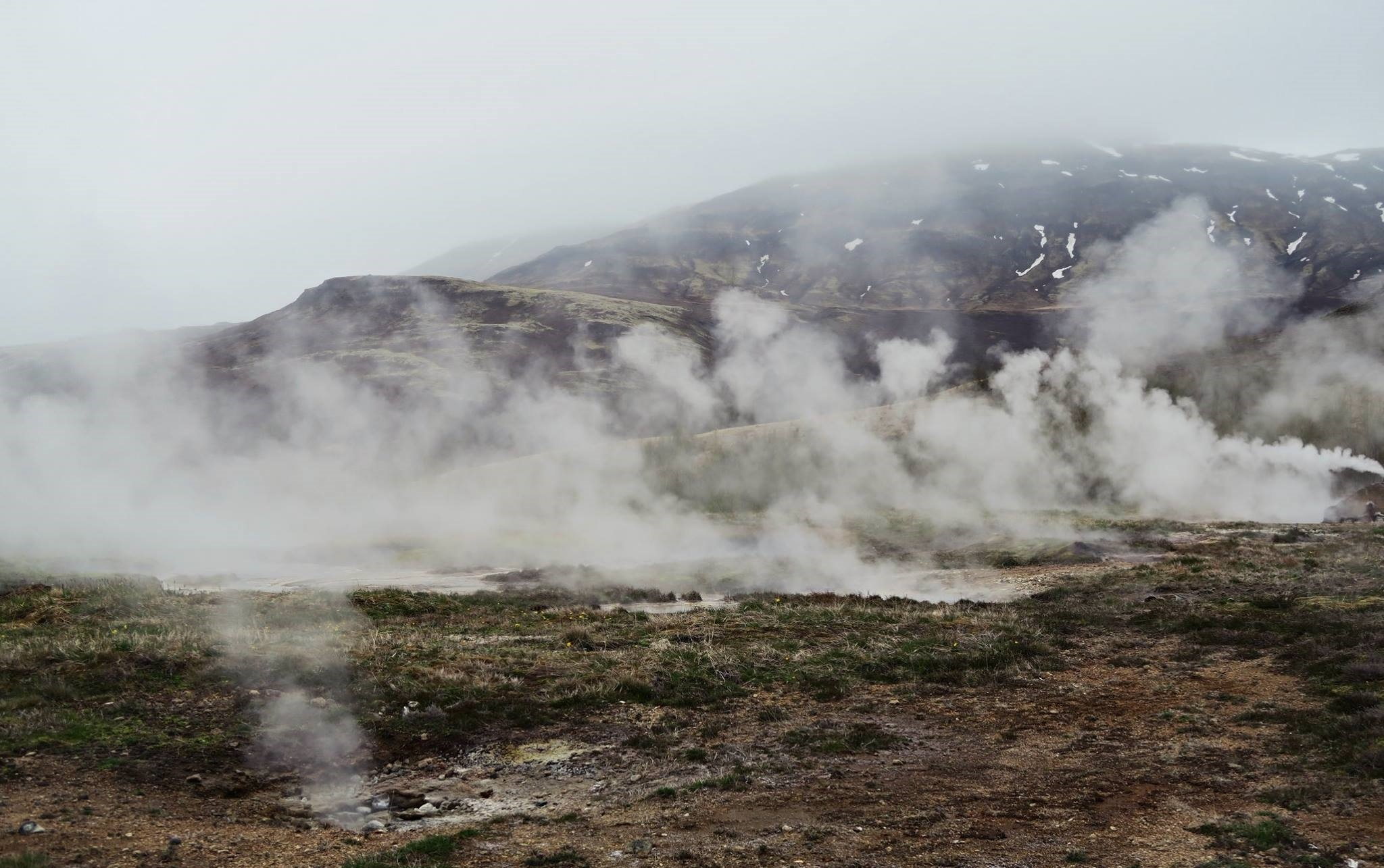
Haukadalur in May 2016, Iceland

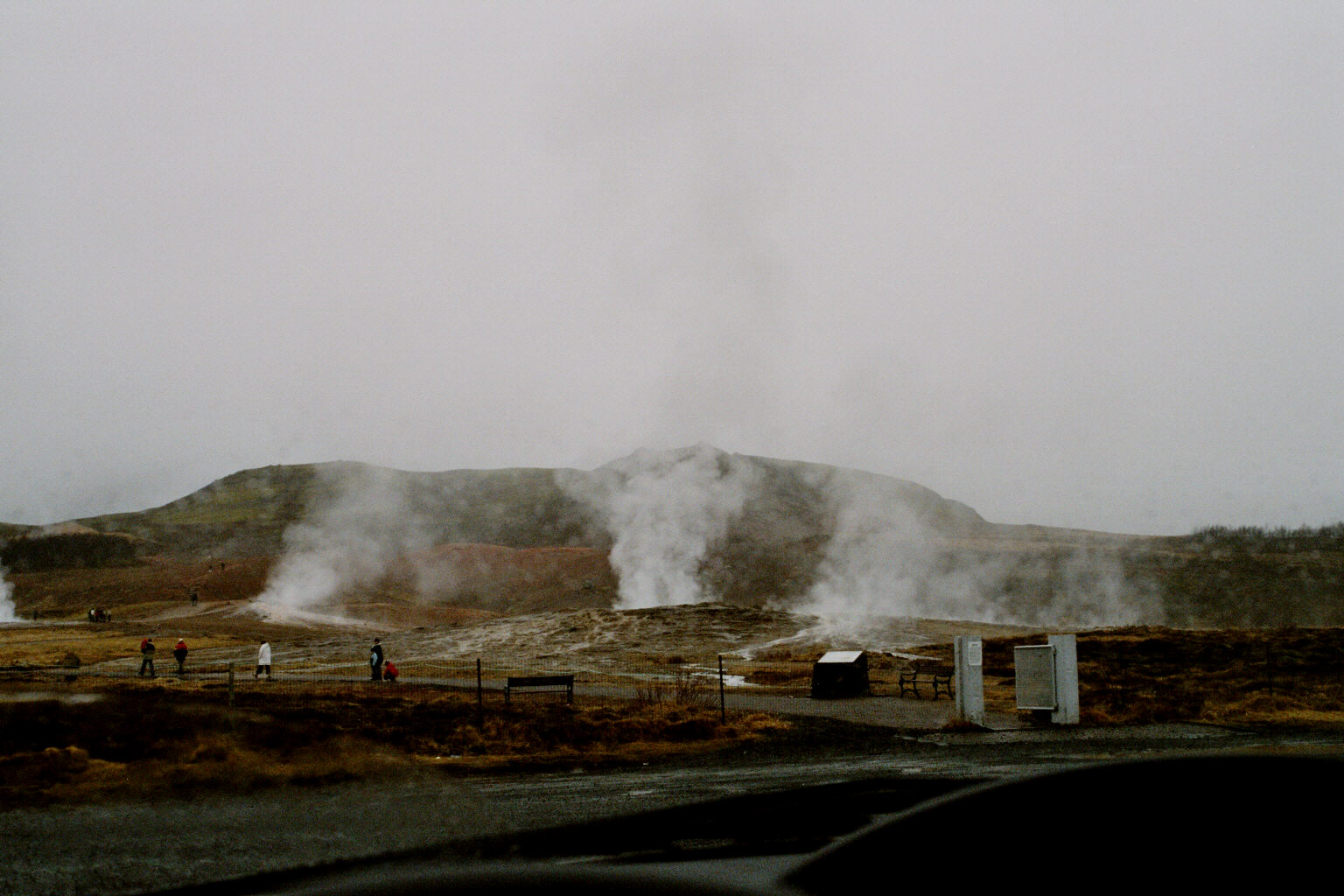
Haukadalur, Iceland

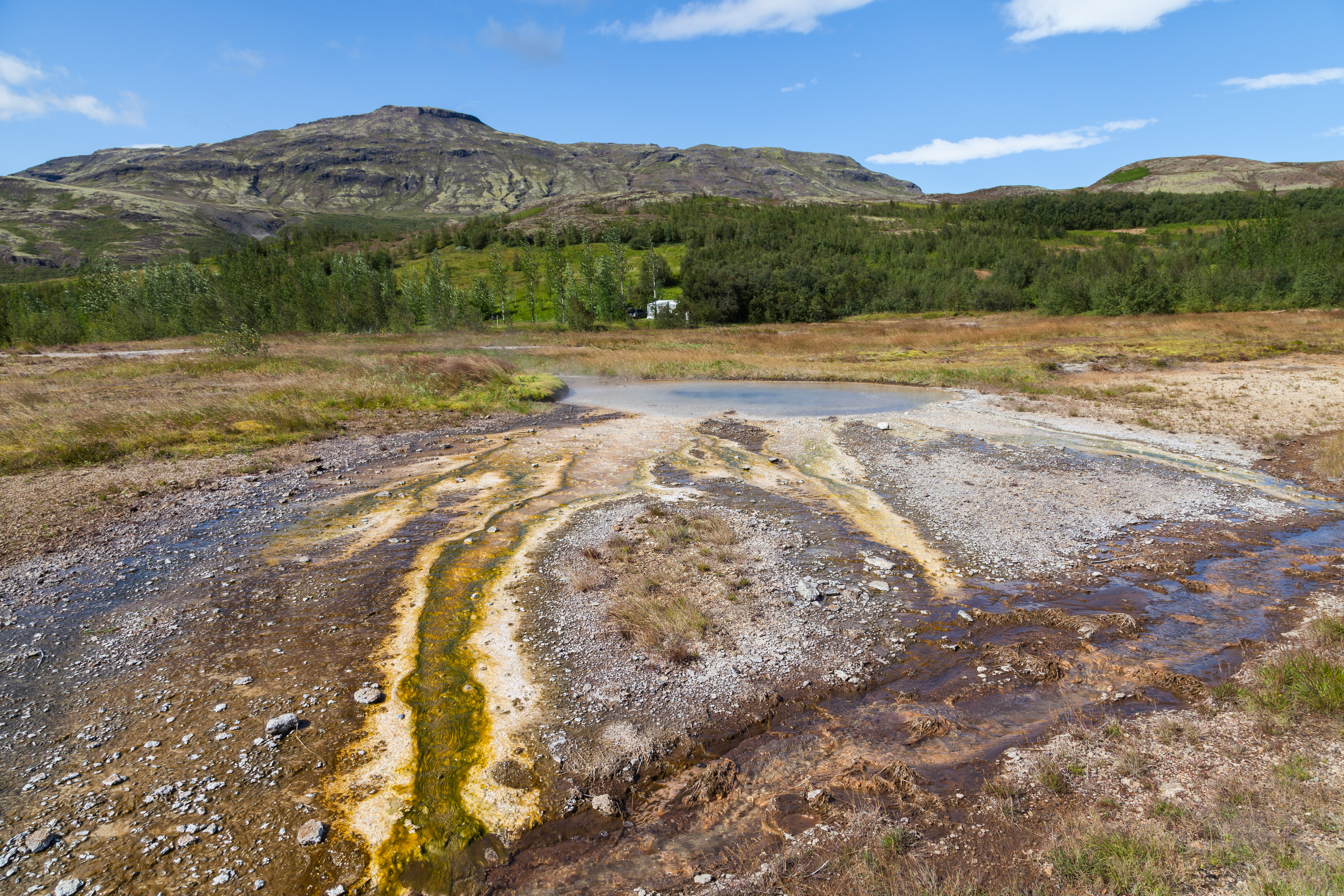
Geothermal area of Geysir

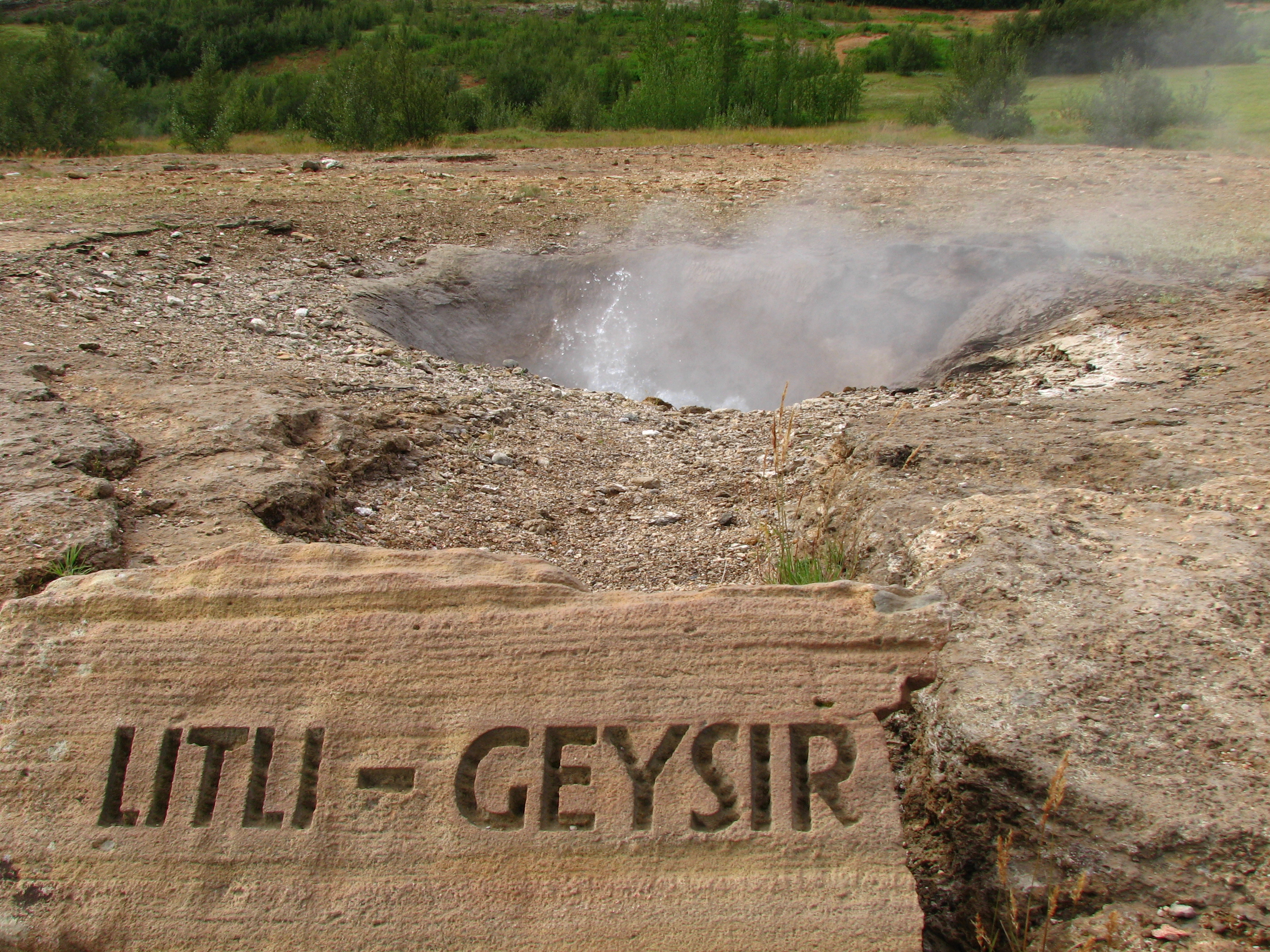
Litli Geysir, Haukadalur, Iceland

== See also ==
- List of cities and towns in Iceland
- List of earthquakes in Iceland
- List of waterfalls of Iceland
- Volcanism of Iceland
