= Geyser =

Natural explosive eruption of hot water

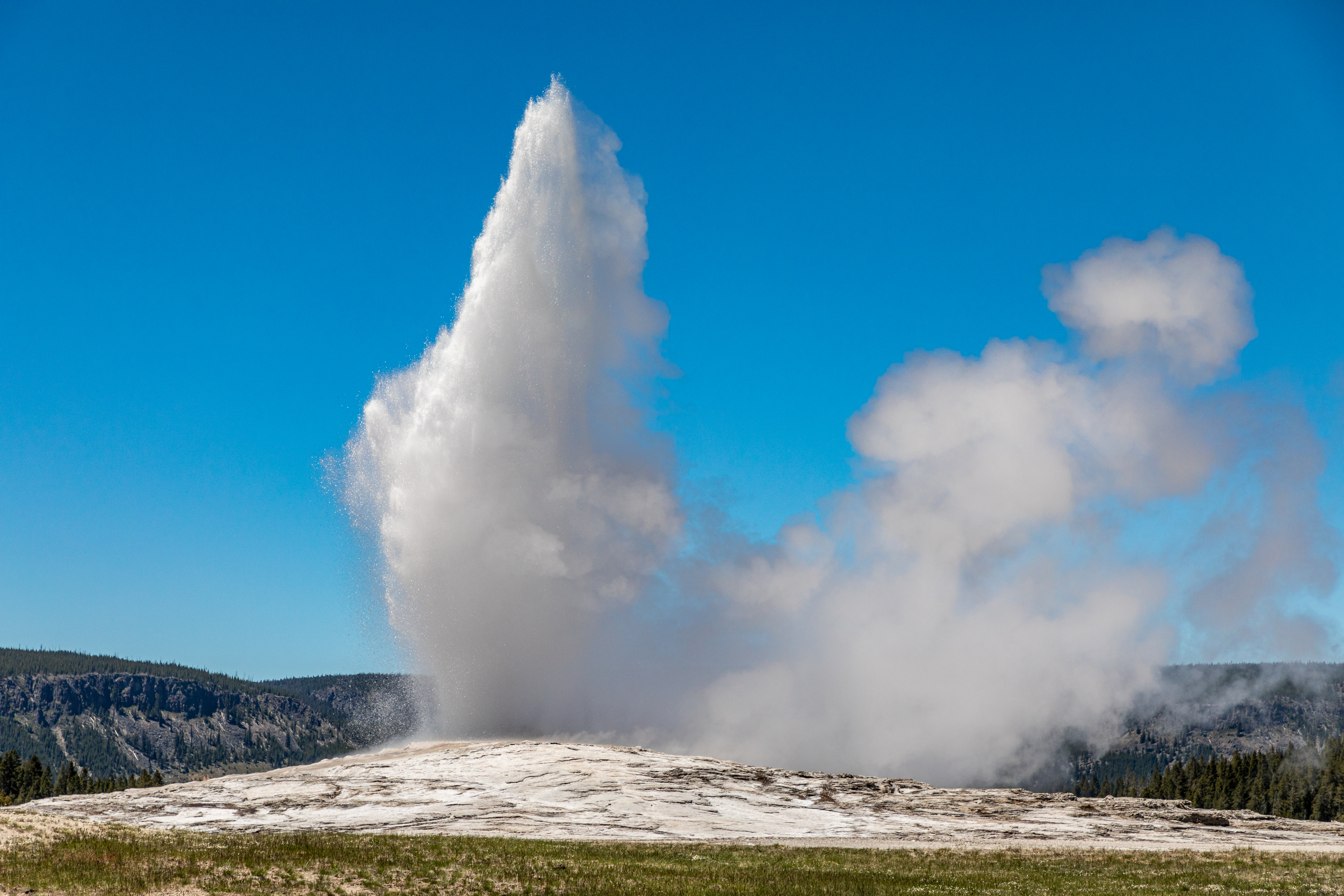
Old Faithful erupting at Yellowstone National Park

A geyser (/ˈɡaɪzər/, UK: /ˈɡiːzər/) is a spring with an intermittent water discharge ejected turbulently and accompanied by steam. The formation of geysers is fairly rare and is caused by particular hydrogeological conditions that exist only in a few places on Earth.

Generally, geyser field sites are located near active volcanic areas, and the geyser effect is due to the proximity of magma. Surface water works its way down to an average depth of around 2,000 metres (6,600 ft) where it contacts hot rocks. The pressurized water boils, and this causes the geyser effect of hot water and steam spraying out of the geyser's surface vent.

A geyser's eruptive activity may change or cease due to ongoing deposition of minerals within their plumbing, exchange of functions with nearby hot springs, earthquake influences, and human intervention. Like many other natural phenomena, geysers are not unique to Earth. Jet-like eruptions, often called cryogeysers, have been observed on several of the moons of the outer Solar System. Due to the low ambient pressures, these eruptions consist of vapour without liquid; they are made more easily visible by particles of dust and ice carried aloft by the gas. Water vapour jets have been observed near the south pole of Saturn's moon Enceladus, while nitrogen eruptions have been observed on Neptune's moon Triton. There are also signs of carbon dioxide eruptions from the southern polar ice cap of Mars.

In the case of Enceladus, the plumes are believed to be driven by internal energy. In the cases of the venting on Mars and Triton, the activity may result from solar heating via a solid-state greenhouse effect. In all three cases, there is no evidence of the subsurface hydrological system which differentiates terrestrial geysers from other sorts of venting, such as fumaroles.

== Etymology ==
The term 'geyser' in English dates back to the late 18th century and comes from Geysir (Icelandic pronunciation: [ˈceiːsɪr̥]), the name of a specific geyser in Iceland, meaning "Gusher" in Icelandic.

== Geology ==
=== Form and function ===
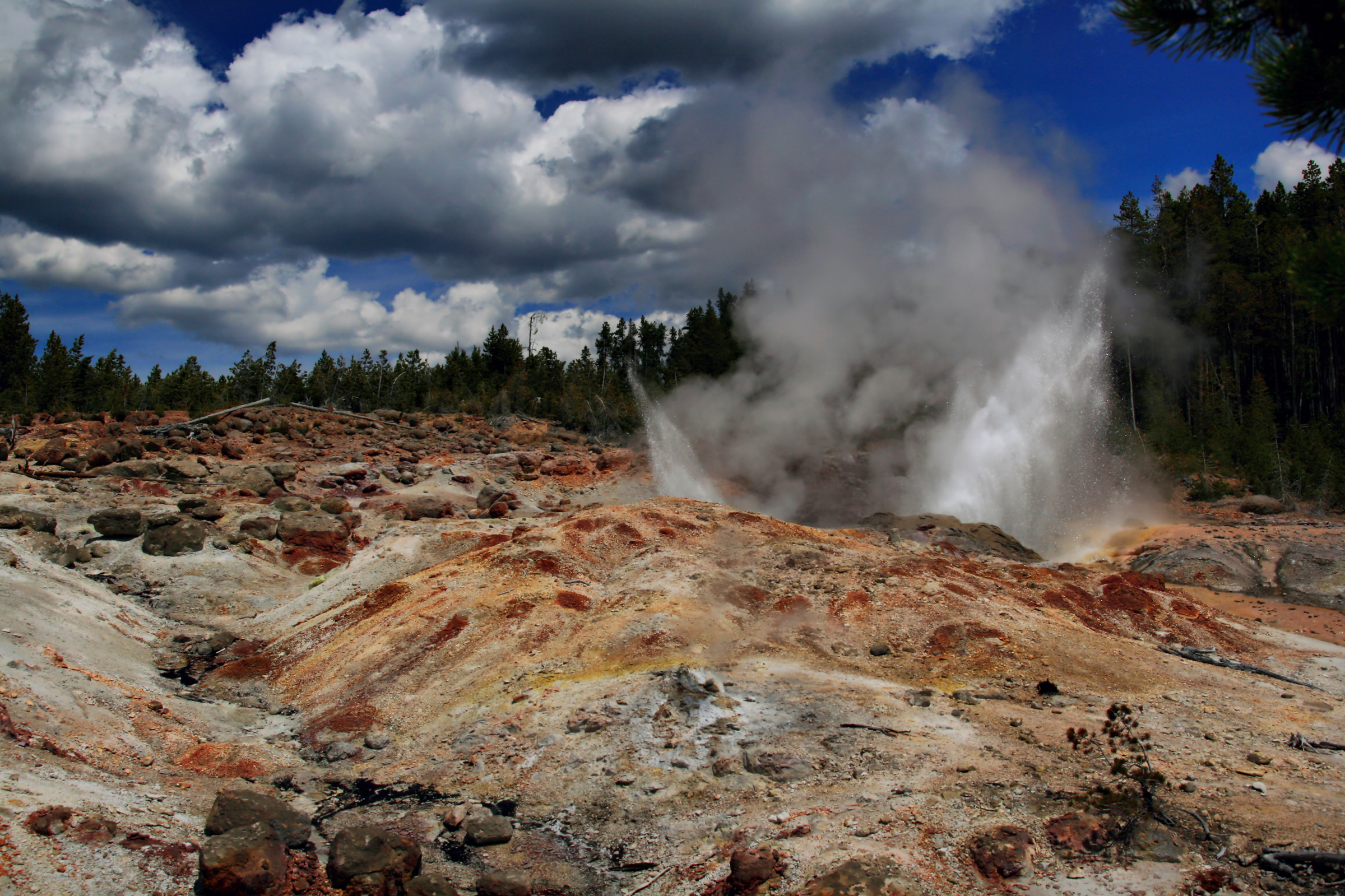
Steamboat Geyser in Yellowstone National Park

Geysers are nonpermanent geological features. Geysers are generally associated with areas of recent magmatism. As the water boils, the resulting pressure forces a superheated column of steam and water to the surface through the geyser's internal plumbing. The formation of geysers specifically requires the combination of three geologic conditions that are usually found in volcanic terrain: heat, water, and a subsurface hydraulic system with the right geometry.

The heat needed for geyser formation comes from magma that needs to be close to the surface of the Earth. For the heated water to form a geyser, a plumbing system (made of fractures, fissures, porous spaces, and sometimes cavities) is required. This includes a reservoir to hold the water while it is being heated.

Geysers tend to be coated with geyserite, or siliceous sinter. The water in geysers comes in contact with hot silica-containing rocks, such as rhyolite. The heated water dissolves the silica. As it gets closer to the surface, the water cools and the silica drops out of solution, leaving a deposit of amorphous opal. Gradually the opal anneals into quartz, forming geyserite. Geyserite often covers the microbial mats that grow in geysers. As the mats grow and the silica is deposited, the mats can form up to 50% of the volume of the geyserite.

=== Eruptions ===
Strokkur geyser erupting
(clockwise from top left)

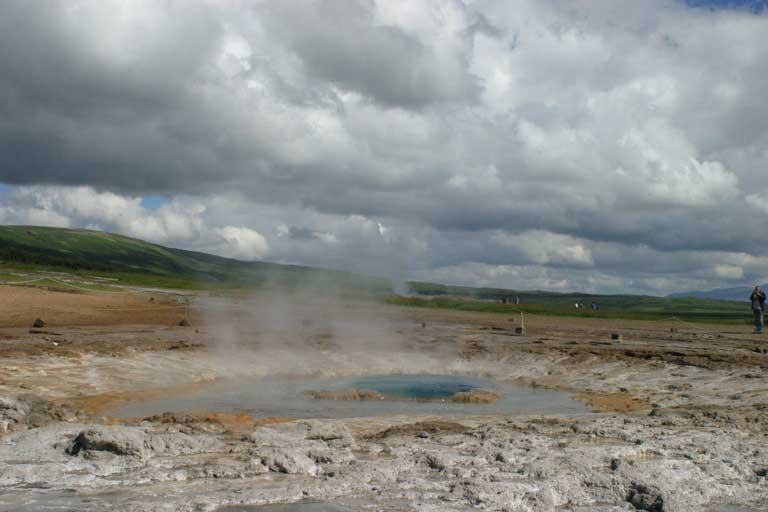
Steam rises from heated water

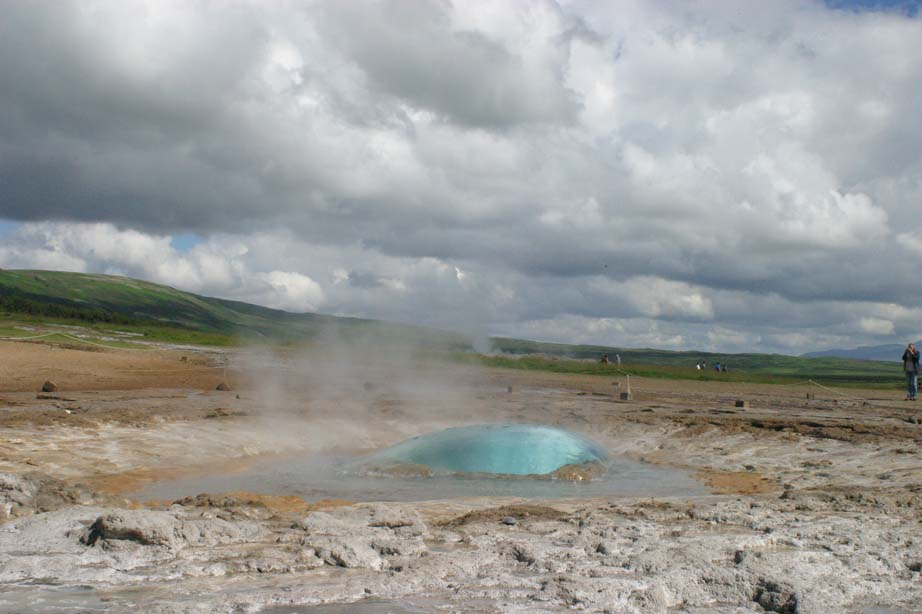
Pulses of water swell upward

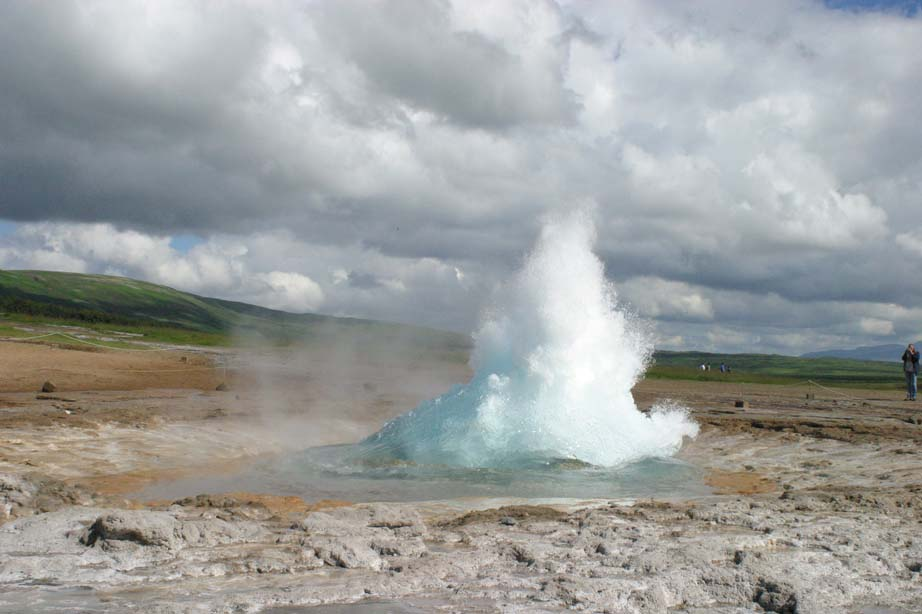
Surface is broken

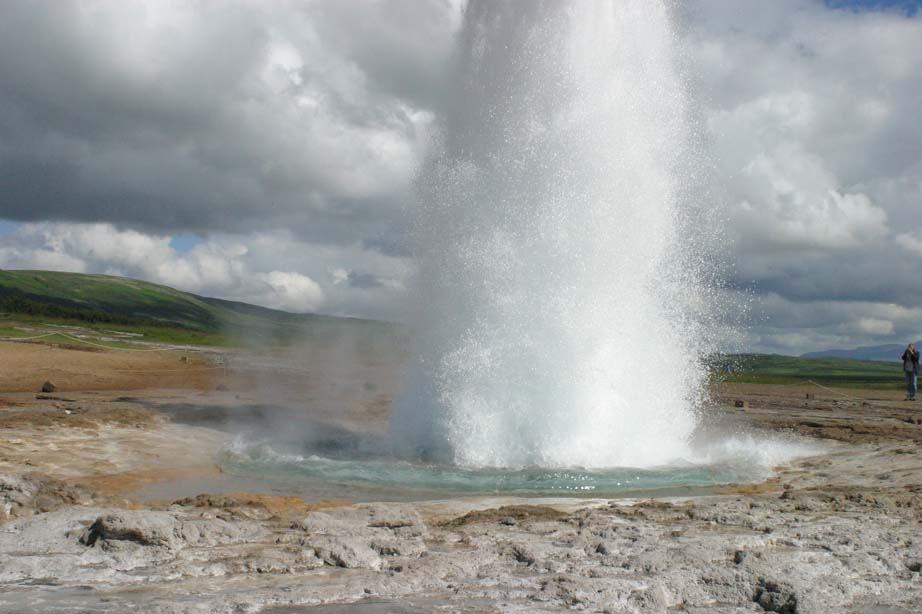
Ejected water spouts upward and falls back down into the pipe

Geyser activity, like all hot spring activity, is caused by surface water gradually seeping down through the ground until it meets geothermally heated rock. In non-eruptive hot springs, the heated water then rises back toward the surface by convection through porous and fractured rocks, while in geysers, the water instead is explosively forced upwards by the high steam pressure created when water boils below. Geysers also differ from non-eruptive hot springs in their subterranean structure: geysers have constrictions in their plumbing that create pressure build-up.

As the geyser fills, the water at the top of the column cools off, but because of the narrowness of the channel, convective cooling of the water in the reservoir is impossible. The cooler water above presses down on the hotter water beneath, not unlike the lid of a pressure cooker, allowing the water in the reservoir to become superheated, i.e. to remain liquid at temperatures well above the standard-pressure boiling point.

Ultimately, the temperatures near the bottom of the geyser rise to a point where boiling begins, forcing steam bubbles to rise to the top of the column. As they burst through the geyser's vent, some water overflows or splashes out, reducing the weight of the column and thus the pressure on the water below. With this release of pressure, the superheated water flashes into steam, boiling violently throughout the column. The resulting froth of expanding steam and hot water then sprays out of the geyser vent.

Eventually the water remaining in the geyser cools back to below the boiling point and the eruption ends; heated groundwater begins seeping back into the reservoir, and the whole cycle begins again. The duration of eruptions and the time between successive eruptions vary greatly from geyser to geyser; Strokkur in Iceland erupts for a few seconds every few minutes, while Grand Geyser in the United States erupts for up to 10 minutes every 8–12 hours.

=== General categorization ===
There are two types of geysers: fountain geysers which erupt from pools of water, typically in a series of intense, even violent, bursts; and cone geysers which erupt from cones or mounds of siliceous sinter (including geyserite), usually in steady jets that last anywhere from a few seconds to several minutes. Old Faithful, perhaps the best-known geyser at Yellowstone National Park, is an example of a cone geyser. Grand Geyser, the tallest predictable geyser on Earth (although Geysir in Iceland is taller, it is not predictable), also at Yellowstone National Park, is an example of a fountain geyser.

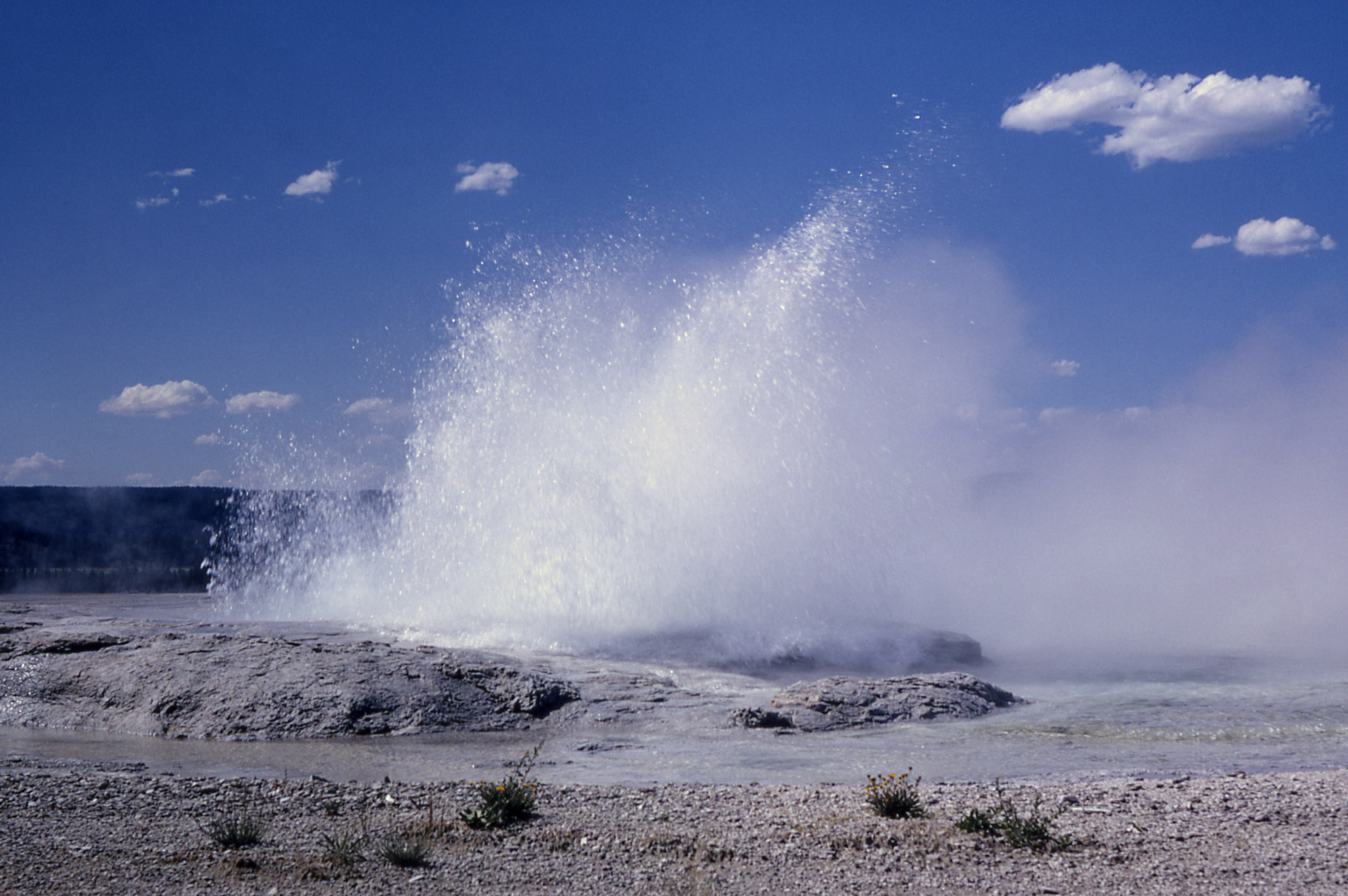
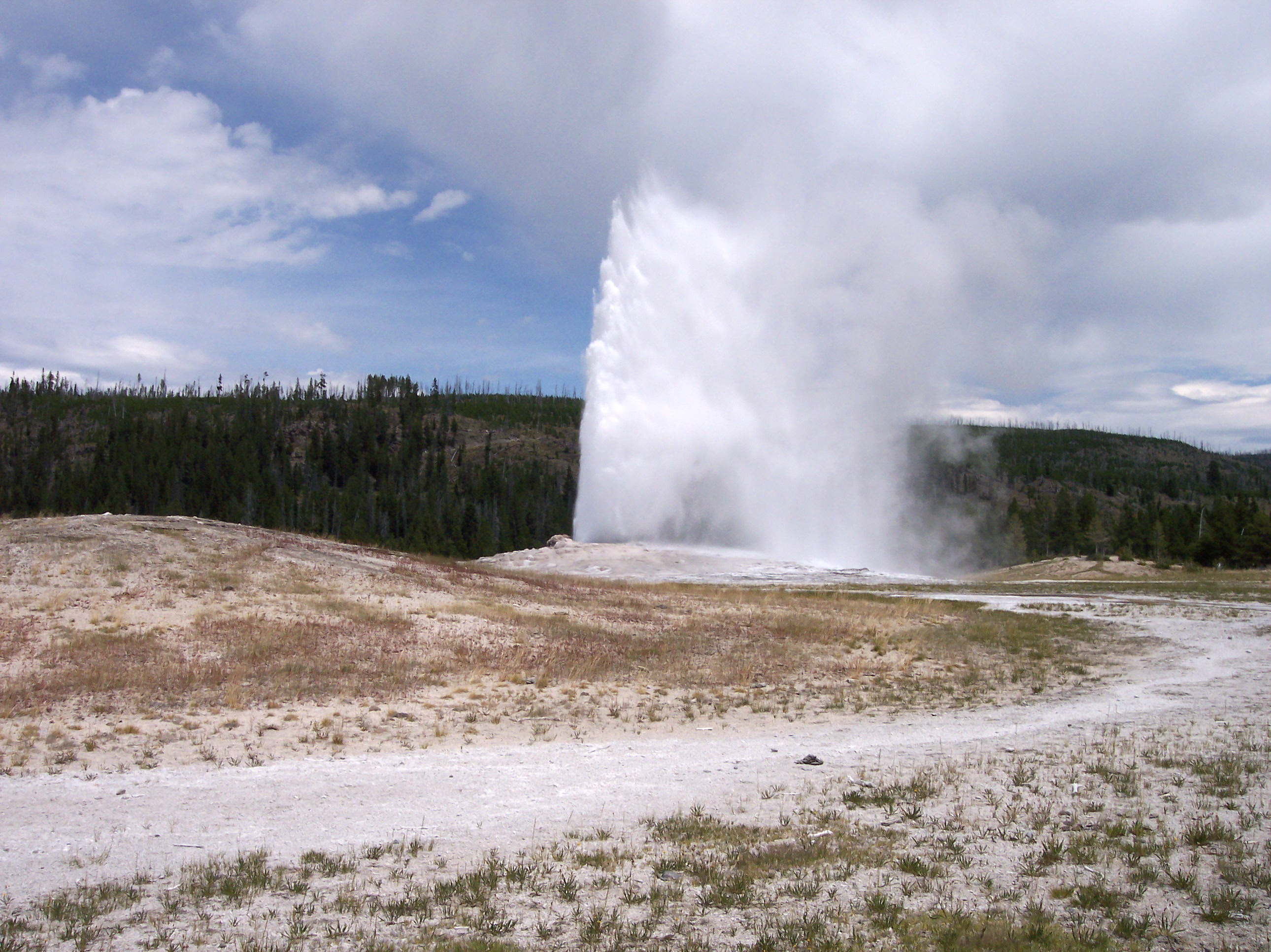
Fountain Geyser erupting from the pool (left) and Old Faithful geyser (cone geyser having mound of siliceous sinter) in Yellowstone National Park erupts approximately every 91 minutes (right).

There are many volcanic areas in the world that have hot springs, mud pots and fumaroles, but very few have erupting geysers. The main reason for their rarity is that multiple intense transient forces must occur simultaneously for a geyser to exist. For example, even when other necessary conditions exist, if the rock structure is loose, eruptions will erode the channels and rapidly destroy any nascent geysers.

Geysers are fragile, and if conditions change, they may go dormant or extinct. Many have been destroyed simply by people throwing debris into them, while others have ceased to erupt due to dewatering by geothermal power plants. However, the Geysir in Iceland has had periods of activity and dormancy. During its long dormant periods, eruptions were sometimes artificially induced—often on special occasions—by the addition of surfactant soaps to the water.

== Biology ==
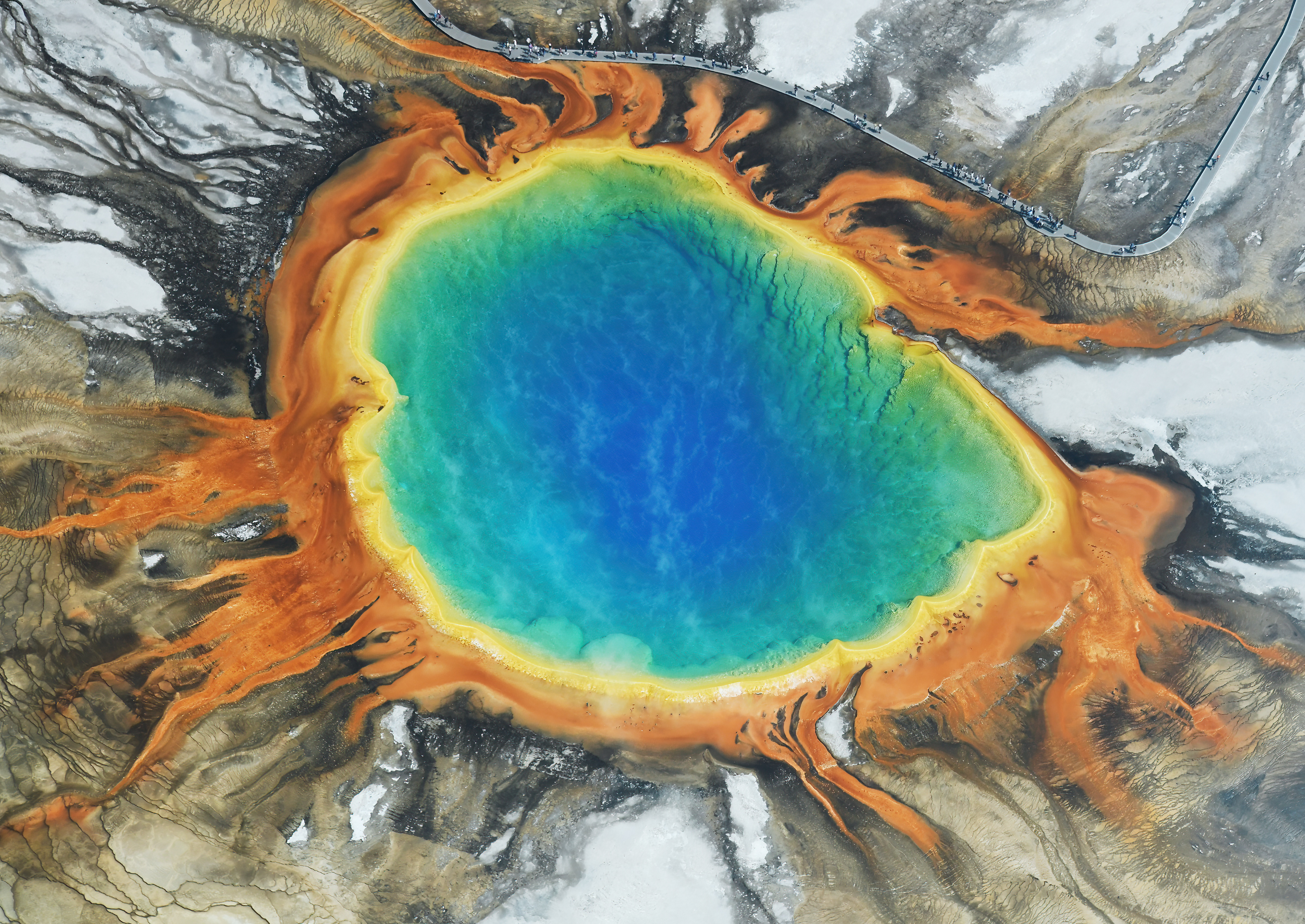
Hyperthermophiles produce some of the bright colours of Grand Prismatic Spring, Yellowstone National Park

Some geysers have specific colours because, despite the harsh conditions, life is often found in them (and also in other hot habitats) in the form of thermophilic prokaryotes. The only known eukaryotic organisms that can survive temperatures between 50-60 °C (140 °F) are fungi.

In the 1960s, when the research of the biology of geysers first appeared, scientists were generally convinced that no life can survive above around 73 °C maximum (163 °F)—the upper limit for the survival of cyanobacteria, as the structure of key cellular proteins and deoxyribonucleic acid (DNA) would be destroyed. The optimal temperature for thermophilic bacteria was placed even lower, around 55 °C average (131 °F).

However, the observations proved that they can exist at high temperatures and that some bacteria even prefer temperatures higher than the boiling point of water. Dozens of such bacteria are known. Thermophiles prefer temperatures from 50 to 70 °C (122 to 158 °F), while hyperthermophiles grow better at temperatures as high as 80 to 110 °C (176 to 230 °F). As they have heat-stable enzymes that retain their activity even at high temperatures, they have been used as a source of thermostable tools, which are important in medicine and biotechnology, for example in manufacturing antibiotics, plastics, detergents (by the use of heat-stable enzymes lipases, pullulanases and proteases), and fermentation products (for example ethanol is produced). Among these, the first discovered and the most important for biotechnology is Thermus aquaticus.

== Major geyser fields and their distribution ==
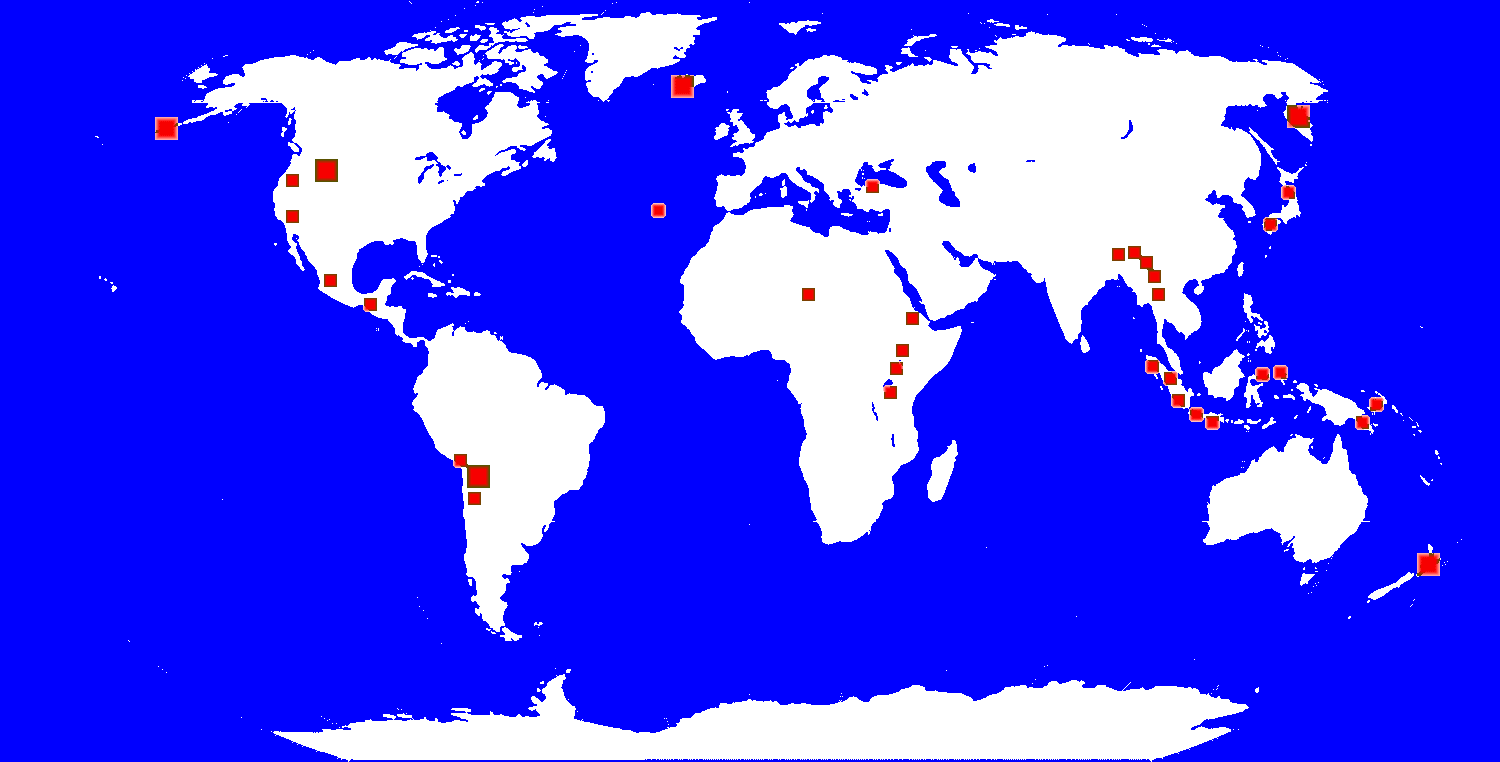
Distribution of major geysers in the world.

Geysers are quite rare, requiring a combination of water, heat, and fortuitous plumbing. The combination exists in few places on Earth.

=== Yellowstone National Park ===
Yellowstone is the largest geyser locale, containing thousands of hot springs, and approximately 300 to 500 geysers. It is home to half of the world's total number of geysers in its nine geyser basins. It is located mostly in Wyoming, USA, with small portions in Montana and Idaho. Yellowstone includes the world's tallest active geyser (Steamboat Geyser in Norris Geyser Basin).

=== Valley of Geysers, Russia ===
Breathing Geyser Double, Valley of Geysers in Kamchatka Krai

The Valley of Geysers (Russian: Долина гейзеров), located in the Kamchatka Peninsula of Russia, is the second-largest concentration of geysers in the world. The area was discovered and explored by Tatyana Ustinova in 1941. There are about 200 geysers in the area, along with many hot-water springs and perpetual spouters. The area was formed by vigorous volcanic activity. The peculiar way of eruptions is an important feature of these geysers. Most of the geysers erupt at angles, and only very few have the geyser cones that exist at many other of the world's geyser fields. On 3 June 2007, a massive mudflow influenced two-thirds of the valley. It was then reported that a thermal lake was forming above the valley. Four of the eight thermal areas in the valley were covered by the landslide or by the lake. Velikan Geyser, one of the field's largest, was not buried in the slide: the slide shortened its period of eruption from 379 minutes before the slide to 339 minutes after (through 2010).

=== El Tatio, Chile ===
A geyser bubbling at El Tatio geyser field

The name "El Tatio" comes from the Quechua word for oven. El Tatio is located in the high valleys of the Andes in Chile, surrounded by many active volcanoes, at around 4,200 metres (13,800 ft) above mean sea level. The valley is home to approximately 80 geysers at present. It became the largest geyser field in the Southern Hemisphere after the destruction of many of the New Zealand geysers, and is the third largest geyser field in the world. The salient feature of these geysers is that the height of their eruptions is very low, the tallest being only six metres (20 ft) high, but with steam columns that can be over 20 metres (66 ft) high. The average geyser eruption height at El Tatio is about 750 millimetres (30 in).

=== Taupō Volcanic Zone, New Zealand ===
The Taupō Volcanic Zone is located on New Zealand's North Island. It is 350 kilometres (217 mi) long by 50 km wide (31 mi) and lies over a subduction zone in the Earth's crust. Mount Ruapehu marks its southwestern end, while the submarine Whakatāne seamount (85 km or 53 mi beyond Whakaari / White Island) is considered its northeastern limit. Many geysers in this zone were destroyed due to geothermal developments and a hydroelectric reservoir: only one geyser basin at Whakarewarewa remains.

In the beginning of the 20th century, the largest geyser ever known, the Waimangu Geyser, existed in this zone. It began erupting in 1900 and erupted periodically for four years until a landslide changed the local water table. Eruptions of Waimangu would typically reach 160 metres (520 ft) and some superbursts are known to have reached 500 metres (1,600 ft). Recent scientific work indicates that the Earth's crust below the zone may be as little as five kilometres (3 mi) thick. Beneath this lies a film of magma 50 kilometres (30 mi) wide and 160 kilometres (100 mi) long.

=== Iceland ===
Due to the high rate of volcanic activity in Iceland, it is home to some of the most famous geysers in the world. There are around 20–29 active geysers in the country, as well as numerous formerly active geysers. Icelandic geysers are distributed in the zone stretching from south-west to north-east, along the boundary between the Eurasian Plate and the North American Plate. Most of the Icelandic geysers are comparatively short-lived. It is also characteristic that many geysers here are reactivated or newly created after earthquakes, becoming dormant or extinct after some years or some decades.

Two most prominent geysers of Iceland are located in Haukadalur. The Great Geysir, which first erupted in the 14th century, gave rise to the word geyser. By 1896, Geysir was almost dormant before an earthquake that year caused eruptions to begin again, occurring several times a day; but in 1916, eruptions all but ceased. Throughout much of the 20th century, eruptions did happen from time to time, usually following earthquakes. Some man-made improvements were made to the spring and eruptions were forced with soap on special occasions. Earthquakes in June 2000 subsequently reawakened the giant for a time, but it is not currently erupting regularly. The nearby Strokkur geyser erupts every 5–8 minutes to a height of some 30 metres (100 ft).

=== Extinct and dormant geyser fields ===
There used to be two large geyser fields in Nevada—Beowawe and Steamboat Springs—but they were destroyed by the installation of nearby geothermal power plants. At the plants, geothermal drilling reduced the available heat and lowered the local water table to the point that geyser activity could no longer be sustained.

Many of New Zealand's geysers have been destroyed by humans in the last century. Several New Zealand geysers have also become dormant or extinct by natural means. The main remaining field is Whakarewarewa at Rotorua. Two-thirds of the geysers at Orakei Korako were flooded by the construction of the hydroelectric Ohakuri dam in 1961. The Wairakei field was lost to a geothermal power plant in 1958. The Rotomahana field was destroyed by the 1886 eruption of Mount Tarawera.

== Misnamed geysers ==
There are various other types of geysers which are different in nature compared to the normal steam-driven geysers. These geysers differ not only in their style of eruption but also in the cause that makes them erupt.

=== Artificial geysers ===
In a number of places where there is geothermal activity, wells have been drilled and fitted with impermeable casements that allow them to erupt like geysers. The vents of such geysers are artificial, but are tapped into natural hydrothermal systems. These so-called artificial geysers, technically known as erupting geothermal wells, are not true geysers. Little Old Faithful Geyser, in Calistoga, California, is an example. The geyser erupts from the casing of a well drilled in the late 19th century, which opened up a dead geyser.

In the case of the Big Mine Run Geyser in Ashland, Pennsylvania, the heat powering the geyser (which erupts from an abandoned mine vent) comes not from geothermal power, but from the long-simmering Centralia mine fire.

=== Perpetual spouter ===
This is a natural hot spring that spouts water constantly without stopping for recharge. Some of these are incorrectly called geysers, but because they are not periodic in nature they are not considered true geysers.

== Commercialization ==
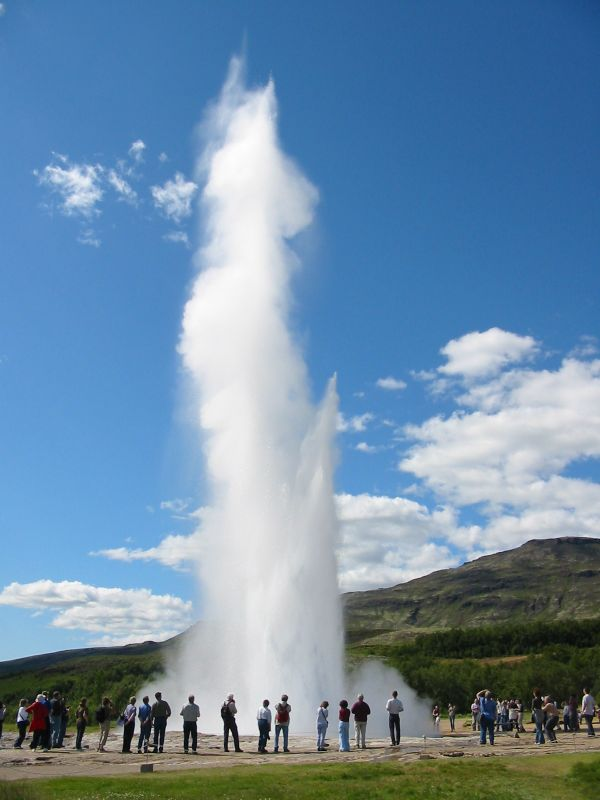
The geyser Strokkur in Iceland – a tourist spot

Geysers are used for various activities such as electricity generation, heating and geotourism. Many geothermal reserves are found all around the world. The geyser fields in Iceland are some of the most commercially viable geyser locations in the world. Since the 1920s hot water directed from the geysers has been used to heat greenhouses and to grow food that otherwise could not have been cultivated in Iceland's inhospitable climate. Steam and hot water from the geysers has also been used for heating homes since 1943 in Iceland. In 1979 the U.S. Department of Energy (DOE) actively promoted development of geothermal energy in the "Geysers-Calistoga Known Geothermal Resource Area" (KGRA) near Calistoga, California through a variety of research programs and the Geothermal Loan Guarantee Program. The department is obligated by law to assess the potential environmental impacts of geothermal development.

== Extraterrestrial geyser-like features ==
There are many bodies in the Solar System where eruptions which superficially resemble terrestrial geysers have been observed or are believed to occur. Despite being commonly referred to as geysers, they are driven by fundamentally different processes, consist of a wide range of volatiles, and can occur on vastly disparate scales; from the modestly sized Martian carbon dioxide jets to the immense plumes of Enceladus. Generally, there are two broad categories of feature commonly referred to as geysers: sublimation plumes, and cryovolcanic plumes (also referred to as cryogeysers).

Sublimation plumes are jets of sublimated volatiles and dust from shallow sources under icy surfaces. Known examples include the CO_{2} jets on Mars, and the nitrogen eruptions on Neptune's moon Triton.

On Mars carbon dioxide jets are believed to occur in the southern polar region of Mars during spring, as a layer of dry ice accumulated over winter is warmed by the sun. Although these jets have not yet been directly observed, they leave evidence visible from orbit in the form of dark spots and lighter fans atop the dry ice. These features consist primarily of sand and dust blown out by the outbursts, as well as spider-like patterns of channels created below the ice by the rapid flow of CO_{2} gas. There are a plethora of theories to explain the eruptions, including heating from sunlight, chemical reactions, or even biological activity.

Triton was found to have active eruptions of nitrogen and dust by Voyager 2 when it flew past the moon in 1989. These plumes were up to 8 km high, where winds would blow them up to 150 km downwind, creating long, dark streaks across the otherwise bright south polar ice cap. There are various theories as to what drives the activity on Triton, such as solar heating through transparent ice, cryovolcanism, or basal heating of nitrogen ice sheets.

Cryovolcanic plumes or cryogeysers generally refer to large-scale eruptions of predominantly water vapour from active cryovolcanic features on certain icy moons. Such plumes occur on Saturn's moon Enceladus and Jupiter's moon Europa.

Plumes of water vapour, together with ice particles and smaller amounts of other components (such as carbon dioxide, nitrogen, ammonia, hydrocarbons and silicates), have been observed erupting from vents associated with the "tiger stripes" in the south polar region of Enceladus by the Cassini orbiter. These plumes are the source of the material in Saturn's E ring. The mechanism which causes these eruptions are generated remains uncertain, as well as to what extent they are physically linked to Enceladus' subsurface ocean, but they are believed to be powered at least in part by tidal heating. Cassini flew through these plumes several times, allowing direct analysis of water from inside another solar system body for the first time.

In December 2013, the Hubble Space Telescope detected water vapour plumes potentially 200 km high above the south polar region of Europa. Re-examination of Galileo data also suggested that it may have flown through a plume during a flyby in 1997. Water was also detected by the Keck Observatory in 2016, announced in a 2019 Nature article speculating the cause to be a cryovolcanic eruption. It is thought that Europa's lineae might be venting this water vapour into space in a similar manner to the "tiger stripes" of Enceladus.

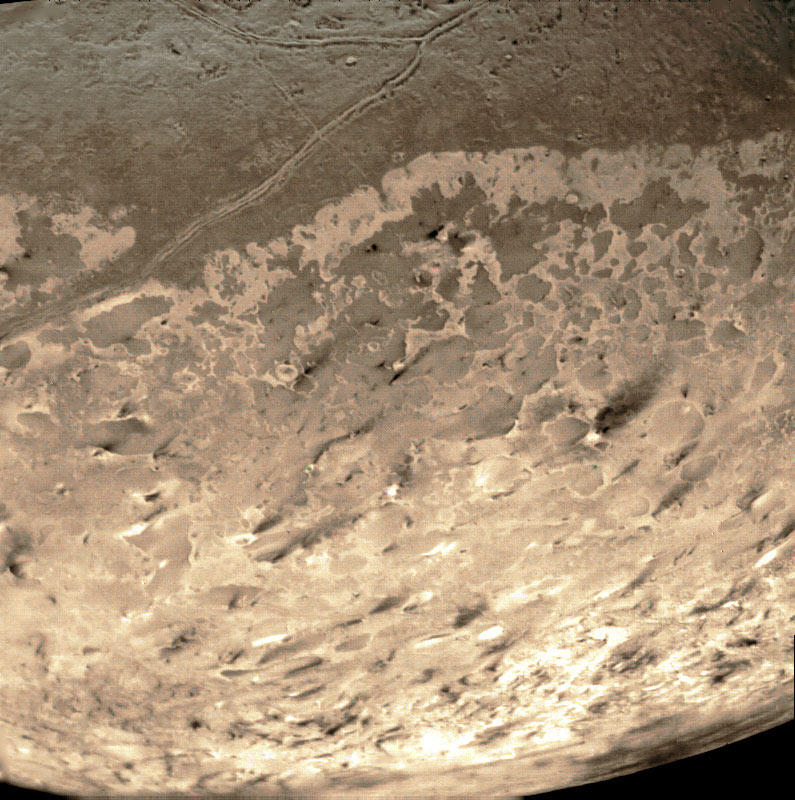
Dark streaks deposited by plumes on Triton

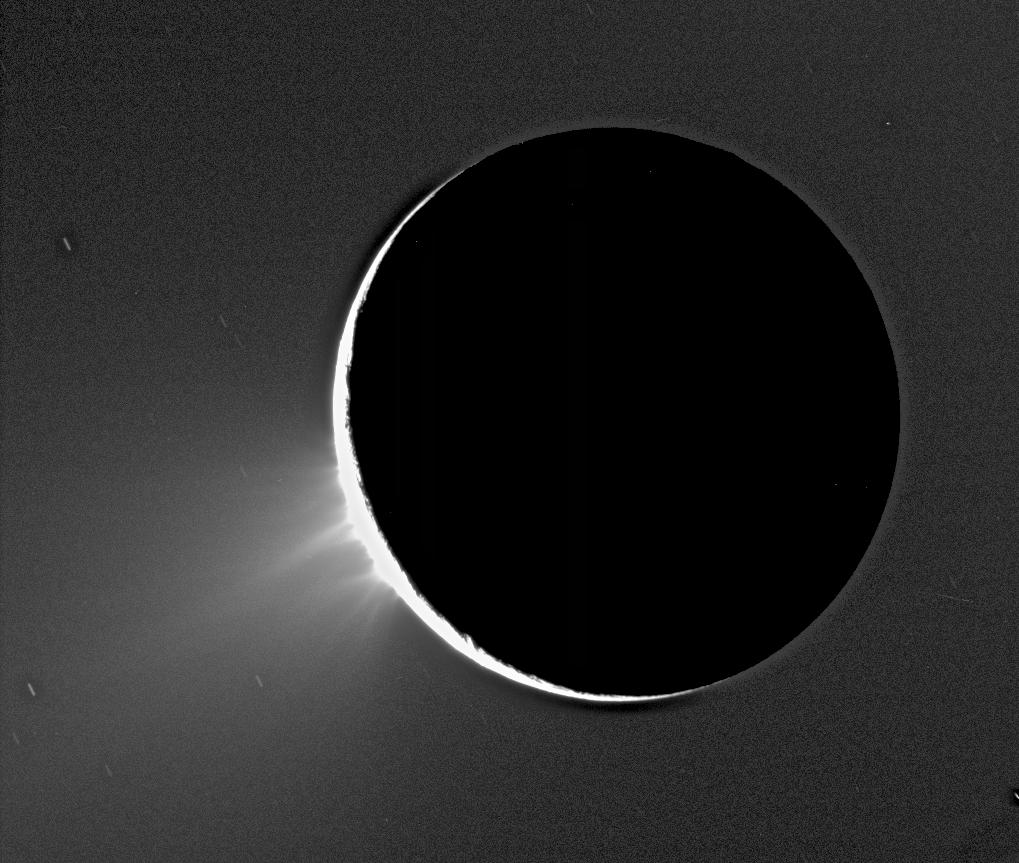
Plumes erupting from Enceladus' subsurface

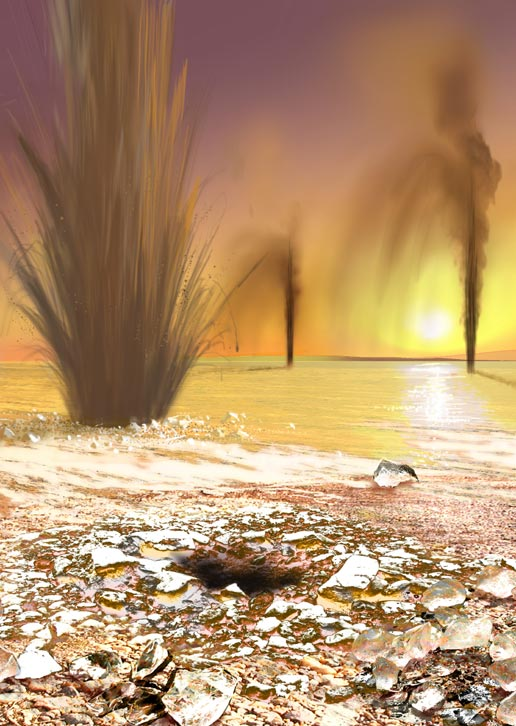
Artist's impression of the carbon dioxide jets on Mars

== See also ==
- Cold-water geyser – Natural explosive eruption of cold water
- Earliest known life forms
- Hot spring – Spring produced by the emergence of geothermally heated groundwater
- Hydrothermal explosion – Explosion of superheated ground water converting to steam
- Ice volcano – Wave-driven mound of ice formed on terrestrial lakes
- List of geysers
- Mudpot – Hot spring, or fumarole, with limited water
- Soffioni – Volcanic vents in Italy
