= ICGV Freyja =

Icelandic Coast Guard offshore patrol vessel

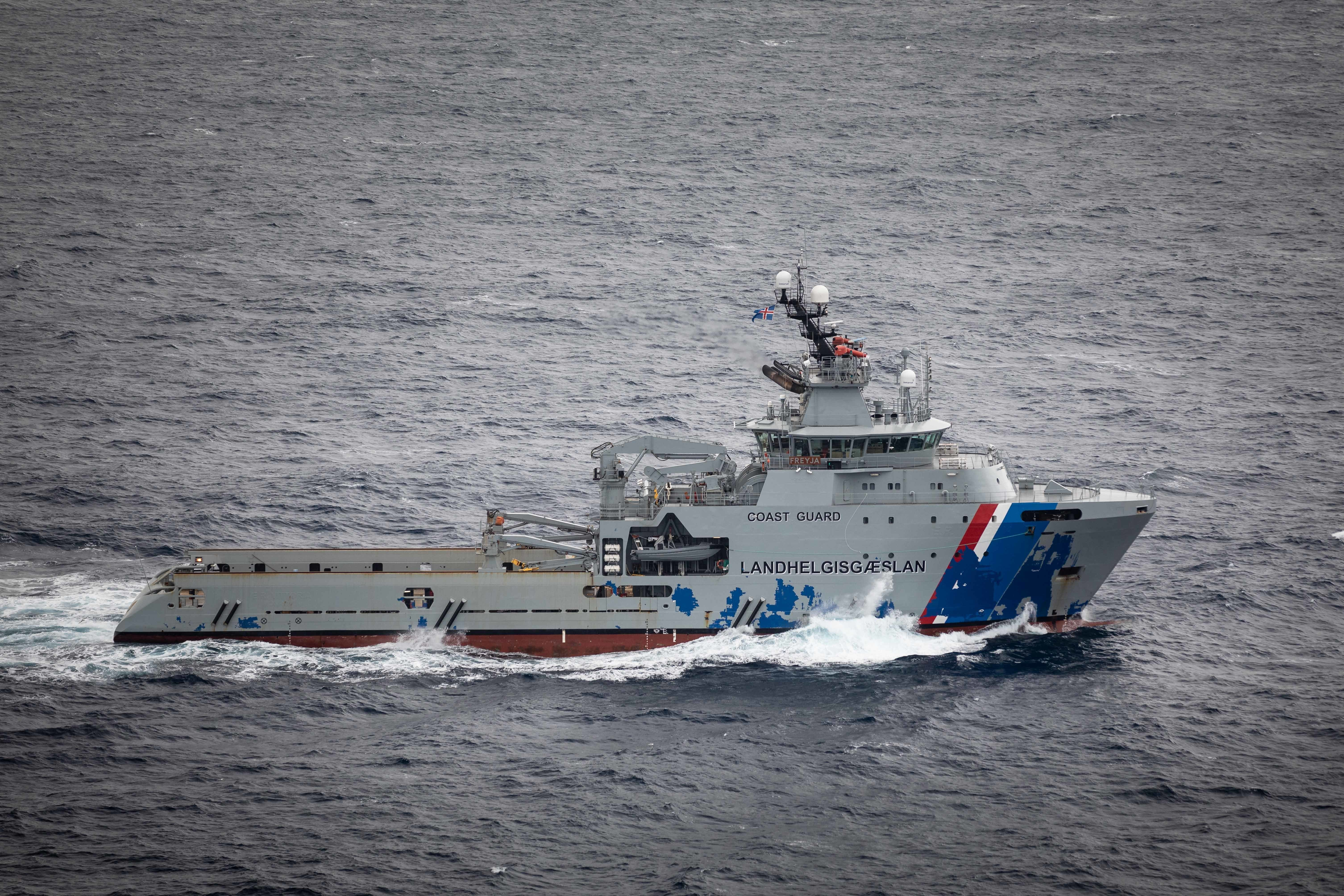
- ICGV Freyja during Northern Viking 2022

History

Iceland
- Name: Freyja
- Namesake: Freyja
- Builder: SeKwang, South Korea
- Launched: 29 April 2009
- Acquired: 2021
- In service: 2021–
- Identification: IMO number: 9455105

General characteristics
- Class & type: Offshore patrol vessel
- Tonnage: 4,566 GT
- Length: 85,8m
- Beam: 19,9m
- Draught: 8,8m
- Installed power: Bergen Diesel ME, 2x6000 kW
- Speed: 17 knots
- Boats & landing craft carried: 2x Waterjet engine FRC
- Complement: 18

ICGV Freyja is an offshore patrol vessel of the Icelandic Coast Guard. The ship is named after Freyja from Norse mythology and is the first Coast Guard vessel to bear the name of a goddess. Its homeport is Siglufjörður on the north coast of Iceland.

== History ==
Formerly an offshore oil industry service ship named E.R.Vittoria and later GH Endurance, it was bought from United Offshore Support GmbH in September 2021 for 1.7 billion ISK to replace the 46-year-old ICGV Týr. It arrived for retrofit in Rotterdam on 11 October and was formally delivered to the Coast Guard on 28 October the same year. It arrived at Siglufjörður on 6 November. It was initially delivered with a faulty coat of paint from its shipyard, but this was rectified in 2022.

In December 2021, Freyja rescued the stranded trawler Masilik after it ran aground on Vatnsleysuströnd.

=== Seizure of the MV Bandero ===
On July 30th, 2026, Freyja became involved in a controversial confrontation with the MV Bandero, a vessel from the ocean conservation group the Captain Paul Watson Foundation. The Bandero and its crew entered into Icelandic waters to directly stop the killing of endangered Fin whales by the Icelandic whaling fleet of Hvlaur hf. The Bandero and its crew had just non-violently confronted and successfully chased the Hvlaur harpoon vessel MV Hvalur 9 away from the whaling grounds. The Freyja arrived on the scene after being called by the captain of the Hvalur 9 for immediate assistance.

Upon arrival, repeated orders were given by the Freyja to the Bandero to immediately leave Icelandic waters. When this was refused, the Freyja launched one of its Rigid inflatable boats at the Bandero. On board were four members of the Icelandic police's special forces unit the Viking Squad. The four members of the squad then boarded the Bandero. Encountering no resistance, the Viking Squad members forcibly seized control of the vessel at gunpoint. The 21 person crew of the Bandero (all unarmed) were arrested and the seized vessel was forcibly brought into Reykjavík's Sundahöfn harbor, arriving there on August 1st.

The controversial seizure of the Bandero and its crew quickly gained International attention, given the disproportionate nature of the decision of the Icelandic Coast Guard to use of a counterterrorism unit to seize control of an unarmed conservation vessel. The incident would even be covered by major news outlets such as The Washington Post.

In response to the criticism, Director General of the Icelandic Coast Guard Georg Kr. Lárusson defended the seizure of the Bandero and its crew in a press interview on July 31st and even controversially stated in regards to the operation to seize the ship that "It was almost like a James Bond movie".

The Bandero currently remains guarded by the Freyja itself in Reykjavík with Iceland's government announcing plans to deport most of the vessel's crew.
