= Thor (1898) =

Former research vessel of Denmark

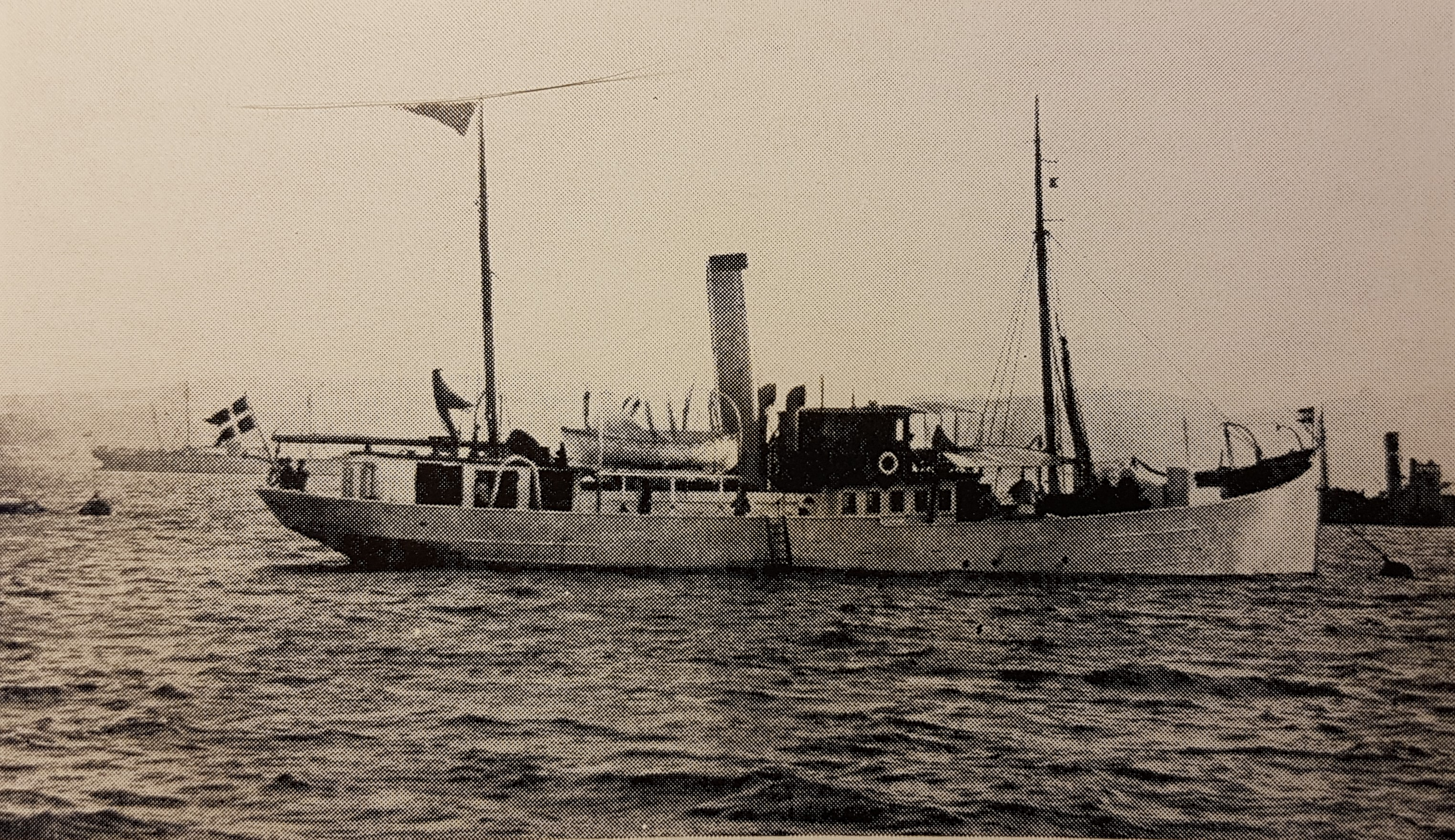
- As the Danish research trawler Thor

History

Denmark
- Name: Thor
- Owner: Islands Handel & Fiskeri A/S (1899–1902); Danish Steam Trawling (1902–1903); Danish Ministry for Agriculture and Fishing (1903–1914)
- Operator: Adolph Carl (1902–1903)
- Port of registry: Copenhagen
- Builder: Edwards Bros., North Shields, England
- Yard number: 606
- Launched: 26 November 1898
- Completed: 1899
- Identification: Call sign: NLBT
- Fate: Transferred for naval service

Denmark
- Name: Thor
- Owner: Ministry of the Navy
- Acquired: 1914
- Commissioned: 1914
- Decommissioned: 1920
- Fate: Sold to Iceland in 1920, as Þór, Wrecked at Húnaflói during a storm on 21 December 1929

General characteristics
- Type: Steam trawler
- Tonnage: 190 GRT; 71 NRT
- Length: 115.3 ft (35.1 m)
- Beam: 21.3 ft (6.5 m)
- Draught: 11.0 ft (3.4 m)
- Decks: 1
- Propulsion: 325 hp (242 kW) triple expansion steam engine, G.T. Grey, South Shields, 1 x screw

Thor was a Danish research vessel from 1903 to 1927. She was launched by Edwards Brothers at North Shields, United Kingdom in 1898 as a steam-powered trawler and entered service in 1899. Thor conducted hydrographical and oceanographical research in the North Atlantic Ocean and the Mediterranean Sea and helped locate the spawning grounds of the Icelandic cod. Thor conducted two expeditions to the Mediterranean Sea in 1908–1910 with Johannes Schmidt as cruise leader. The aim of the expeditions, funded by the Carlsberg Foundation, was to locate the spawning grounds of the European eel. Contrary to their expectations the expeditions found that fewer eel larvae (leptocephals) were found the deeper they went into the Mediterranean, but they also grew larger. The logical conclusion was that the spawning grounds were not in the Mediterranean, but in the Atlantic Ocean. In a broader perspective, the greatest result of the two expeditions was the very large contribution to the general understanding of the oceanography and pelagic fauna of the Mediterranean.

In 1914, Thor was commissioned into the Royal Danish Navy as a patrol vessel during World War I, in which she remained until decommissioned in 1920 and sold to Iceland. During her naval service the ship was armed with 47-millimetre (1.9 in) cartridge gun.

== Icelandic service ==
In 1920, Björgunarfélag Vestmannaeyja bought the ship and renamed her Þór. After paying for her operational cost for several years, the Icelandic government decided to acquire the ship in 1926. With her purchase, the Icelandic Coast Guard was de facto established. In December 1929, Þór ran aground at Húnaflói during a storm and was wrecked.

The two Thor expeditions to the Mediterranean Sea
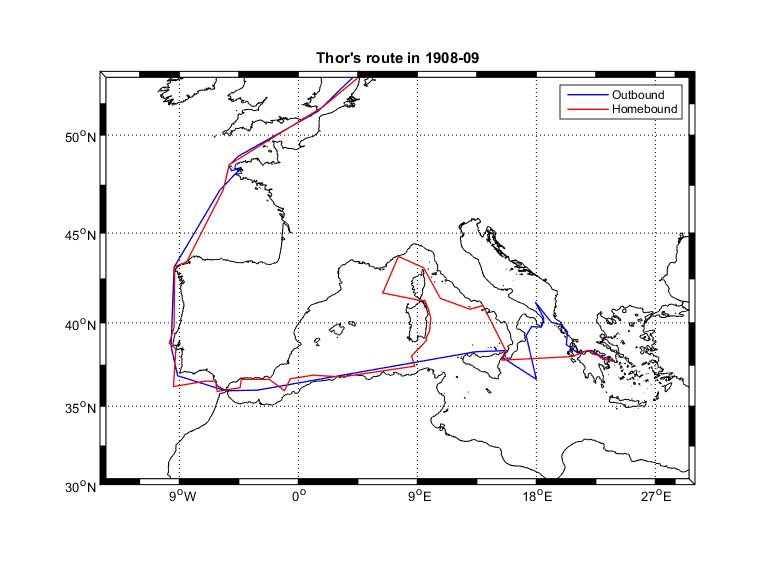
First expedition in 1908–1909.

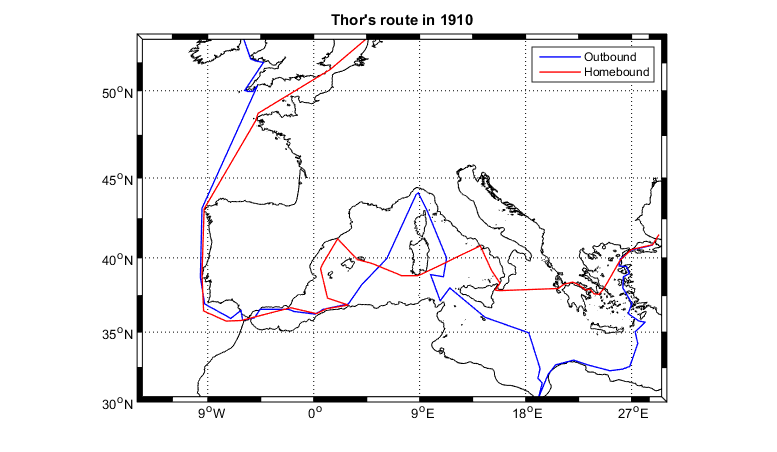
Second expedition in 1910.
