= Northern Viking =

Annual NATO exercise held in Iceland

Northern Viking is an annual NATO exercise held in Iceland. The exercises were held biennially until 2006 when the frequency was increased. The purpose of the exercise is to test the capabilities of Iceland and its NATO allies, as well as increase the readiness of the forces involved and their inter-operability.

== Northern Viking 2022 ==
Several NATO member states participated in the exercises in 2022. The United States Navy, in a press release, described 2022's exercise as "a hunt for adversary submarines" and "visit, board, search and seizure missions on suspect vessels."

=== Participants ===
- Iceland
  - ICGV Þór
- United States
  - USS Arlington
  - CH-53E Sea Stallions
  - 22nd Marine Expeditionary Unit
  - USS Kearsarge
- France
  - FS Latouche-Tréville
- Norway
  - HNoMS Thor Heyerdahl
- Germany
  - FGS Sachsen
- United Kingdom
  - Royal Marine Commandos

== Northern Viking 2011 ==
Northern Viking 2011 was held by the Icelandic Coast Guard and the United States Air Forces in Europe (USAFE). Among the training exercises were transport of troops to and from Iceland and air defence. The exercise also tested cooperation of naval and air assets in view of increasing importance arctic operations.

=== Participants ===
- Iceland
- United States
- Denmark
- Norway
- Italy

- (Iceland) ICG: 3 offshore patrol vessels
- (United States) USAF: F-16 fighters, 3 KC-135 air-refueling planes
- (Norway) RNoAF: F-16 fighters
- (Italy) AM: Eurofighter Typhoon fighters
- (Denmark) RDN: 1 Thetis-class patrol vessel, 1 Lynx helicopter

== Northern Viking 2008 ==
Northern Viking 2008 was held by the Icelandic Defence Agency and the United States European Command (EUCOM). More than 400 foreign troops were deployed to Icelandic bases with aircraft and a Danish warship.

=== Participants ===
- Iceland
- United States
- Canada
- Denmark
- Norway

=== Operations ===
The exercise consisted of an air defence exercise and a maritime defence exercise.

==== Air defence exercise ====
- (Iceland) ICG: 2 SAR-helicopters
- (United States) USAF: 4 fighters, 3 KC-135 air-refueling planes
- (Norway) RNoAF: 5 F-16 fighters
- (Canada) RCAF: 6 CF-18 fighters
- NATO: 2 E-3 AWACS planes

==== Maritime defence exercise ====
- (Iceland) ICG: 1 Ægir-class offshore patrol vessel, 1 helicopter
- (Denmark) RDN: 1 Thetis-class patrol vessel
- (United States) USN: 2 P-3 Orion ASW aircraft

== Northern Viking 2007 ==
Northern Viking 2007 was held by the Icelandic MFA Office of Defence and the United States European Command (EUCOM). More than 240 foreign troops were deployed to Icelandic bases with aircraft and a Danish warship.

=== Participants ===
- Iceland
- United States
- Latvia
- Denmark
- Norway

=== Operations ===
The exercise consisted of an air defence exercise and an anti-terrorist exercise.

==== Air defence exercise ====
- (Iceland) ICG: 2 SAR-helicopters
- (United States) USAF: 3 F-15 fighters, 2 KC-135 air-refueling planes
- (Denmark) RDN: 1 Thetis-class frigate
- (Norway) RNoAF: 2 F-16 fighters, 1 P-3 Orion ASW aircraft
- NATO: 2 E-3 AWACS planes

==== Anti-terrorist exercise ====
- (Iceland) : 15 Víkingasveitin troops, 1 helicopter
- (Denmark) : 6 Jægerkorpset troops, 1 helicopter
- (Latvia) : 16 Latvian Special Tasks Unit troops
- (Norway) : 20 Forsvarets Spesialkommando (FSK) troops
