= HMS Diomede (F16) =

Type 12I or Leander-class frigate of the Royal Navy and Pakistan Navy

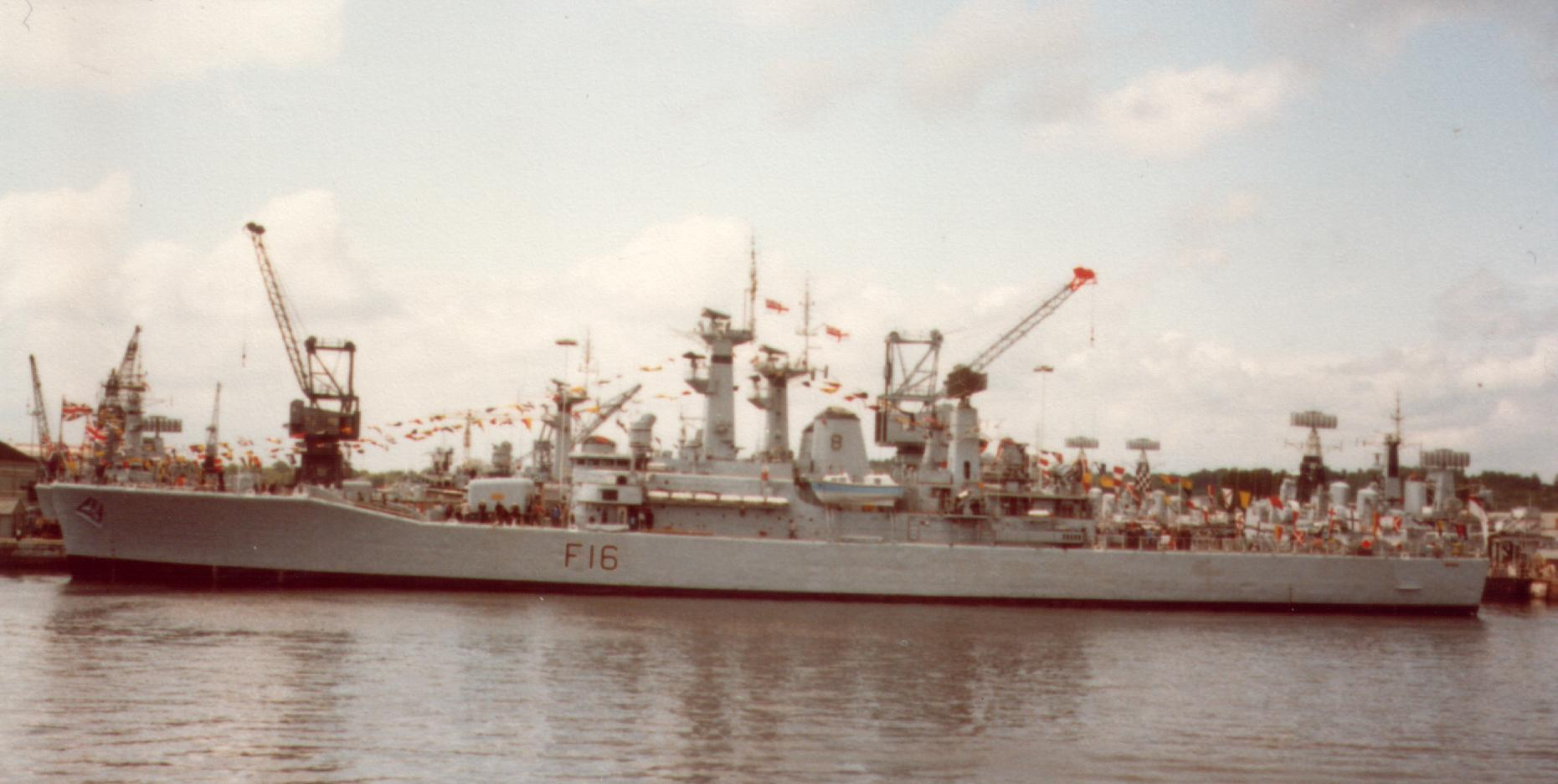
- HMS Diomede

History

United Kingdom
- Name: Diomede
- Namesake: Diomede
- Builder: Yarrow Shipbuilders
- Laid down: 30 January 1968
- Launched: 15 April 1969
- Commissioned: 2 April 1971
- Decommissioned: 31 May 1988
- Fate: Sold to Pakistan, July 1988

Pakistan
- Name: Shamsheer
- Commissioned: 1988
- Fate: Scrapped

General characteristics
- Class & type: Leander-class frigate
- Displacement: 3,200 long tons (3,251 t) full load
- Length: 113.4 m (372 ft 1 in)
- Beam: 12.5 m (41 ft 0 in)
- Draught: 5.8 m (19 ft 0 in)
- Propulsion: 2 × Babcock & Wilcox boilers supplying steam to two sets of White-English Electric double-reduction geared turbines to two shafts
- Speed: 28 knots (52 km/h; 32 mph)
- Range: 4,600 nmi (8,500 km; 5,300 mi) at 15 knots (28 km/h; 17 mph)
- Complement: 223
- Armament: As built: 1 × twin 4.5 inch (114 mm) guns; 1 × quadruple Sea Cat anti-aircraft missile launchers; 1 × Limbo anti-submarine mortar; From 1980: 2 × quadruple Seacat anti-aircraft missile launchers; 2 × single 40 mm Bofors anti-aircraft guns; 2 × triple torpedo tubes
- Aircraft carried: 1 × Westland Wasp helicopter; From 1980: 1 × Lynx helicopter

HMS Diomede (F16) was a Leander-class frigate of the Royal Navy. She was built by Yarrow Shipbuilders in Glasgow. Diomede was launched on 15 April 1969 and commissioned on 2 April 1971. In 1988, the vessel was taken out of service and sold to Pakistan. Renamed PNS Shamsheer, the vessel served with the Pakistan Navy until being scrapped.

== Service history ==
=== Royal Navy service ===
In 1972, Diomede took part in the Second Cod War during the fishing dispute with Iceland, though Diomede's involvement was more quiet than her involvement in the subsequent Cod War. Also that year, Diomede joined the 3rd Frigate Squadron which was then based in the Far East.

In 1974, Diomede, took part in Task Group (TG) 317.2 which was a deployment that caused some controversy back in the UK when the TG, on its way to the Far East/Pacific, visited South Africa, which was at that time under apartheid rule, as well as performing military exercises with the South African armed forces. Diomede, along with the nuclear submarine Warspite, visited the port of Simonstown while the rest of the TG visited Cape Town. The TG, upon reaching the Far East performed a number of exercises and 'fly the flag' visits with Far East and Pacific countries. They did not visit South Africa on their return, and headed to Brazil for an exercise with the Brazilian Navy. Diomede returned to the UK in June 1975.

The following year, Diomede joined the Fishery Protection Squadron, and took part in the Third Cod War. During that conflict, Diomede collided three times with Icelandic Coast Guard vessels, once with ICGV Týr and three times with ICGV Baldur, with the last one inflicting a 12-foot (3.7 m) gash on Diomede's port beam, knocking her out of the conflict.

In 1977, Diomede took part in the Fleet Review, in honor of Queen Elizabeth II's Silver Jubilee as part of the 3rd Frigate Squadron. The ship was adopted by the borough of Langbaurgh in North Yorkshire in 1978.

Also in the 1970s, Diomede was one of the seven Leanders used as the fictional HMS Hero for the BBC TV drama series Warship. All members of the crew were given Hero cap tallies for filming purposes.

Her modernisation that would have given her Exocet and Sea Wolf was cancelled due to John Nott's 1981 Defence Review and she was intended to be placed in the Standby Squadron but the decision was repealed due to the 1982 Falklands War. During the Falklands conflict she was sent to intercept a possible Argentine type 42 destroyer and escorted an Royal Fleet Auxiliary vessel around the coast to Chile. During that year, Diomede was deployed to the Persian Gulf as part of the Armilla patrol.

In 1983 she deployed again to the West Indies as the 'West Indies Guardship' accompanying Queen Elizabeth II aboard HMY Britannia. The Queen was so impressed by the way her ship's company performed their duties, that she ordered 'splice the mainbrace'.

Diomede returned to the South Atlantic in 1987 where she performed a number of patrols in the vicinity of the Falkland Islands as well as visiting the Island of South Georgia.

=== Pakistan Navy service ===
In 1988, Diomede was decommissioned from the Royal Navy and subsequently sold to Pakistan where she was renamed PNS Shamsheer. Shamsheer continued in service for many years until she was decommissioned by Pakistan Navy in 2003 and scrapped.

== Publications ==
- Colledge, J. J.; Warlow, Ben (2006) [1969]. Ships of the Royal Navy: The Complete Record of All Fighting Ships of the Royal Navy from the 15th Century to the Present (3rd Rev ed.). London: Chatham Publishing. ISBN 978-1-86176-281-8. OCLC 67375475.
- Marriott, Leo, 1983. Royal Navy Frigates 1945-1983, Ian Allan Ltd. ISBN 07110 1322 5
