= ICGV Baldur (1991) =

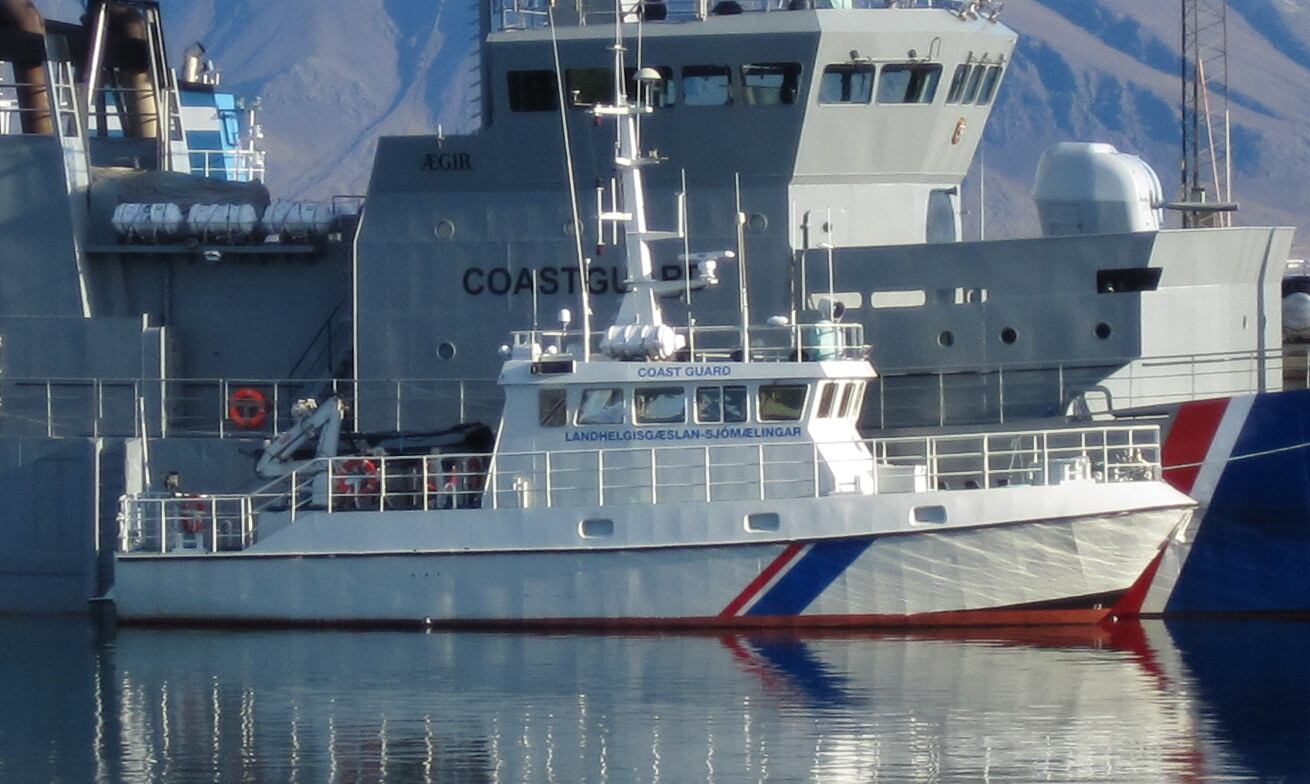
- ICGV Baldur

History

Iceland
- Name: Baldur
- Namesake: Baldur
- Builder: Vélsmiðja Seyðisfjarðar
- Launched: 14 April 1991
- Identification: IMO number: 9002661; MMSI number: 251004100; Callsign: TFDA

General characteristics
- Class & type: Patrol and survey vessel
- Length: 21.3 m (69 ft 11 in)
- Beam: 5.2 m (17 ft 1 in)
- Draught: 1.8 m (5 ft 11 in)
- Speed: 12 knots (22 km/h; 14 mph)
- Complement: 4-8

ICGV Baldur is a patrol and survey vessel of the Icelandic Coast Guard. The ship was built by Vélsmiðja Seyðisfjarðar in Iceland in 1991 and entered service the same year. Over its three decade career it has been used for hydrographic surveying, patrol, law enforcement, exercises and various other projects along the country's shores. The ship is named after the Norse god Baldur and is the third coast guard vessel to bear the name.

== History ==
On 27 August 2002, while on a hydrographic surveying mission, ICGV Baldur discovered the relatively intact wreckage of a Northrop N-3PB lying upside down at the depth of around 11 meters in Skerjafjörður, close to Reykjavík. It is one of only two known N-3PB's in the world out of 24 built. In 2003, the National Archeology Department of Iceland issued conservation document in which the wreckage of the plane is declared protected.

== See also ==
- ICGV Baldur (II)
