= USS Arlington (LPD-24) =

US Navy amphibious transport ship

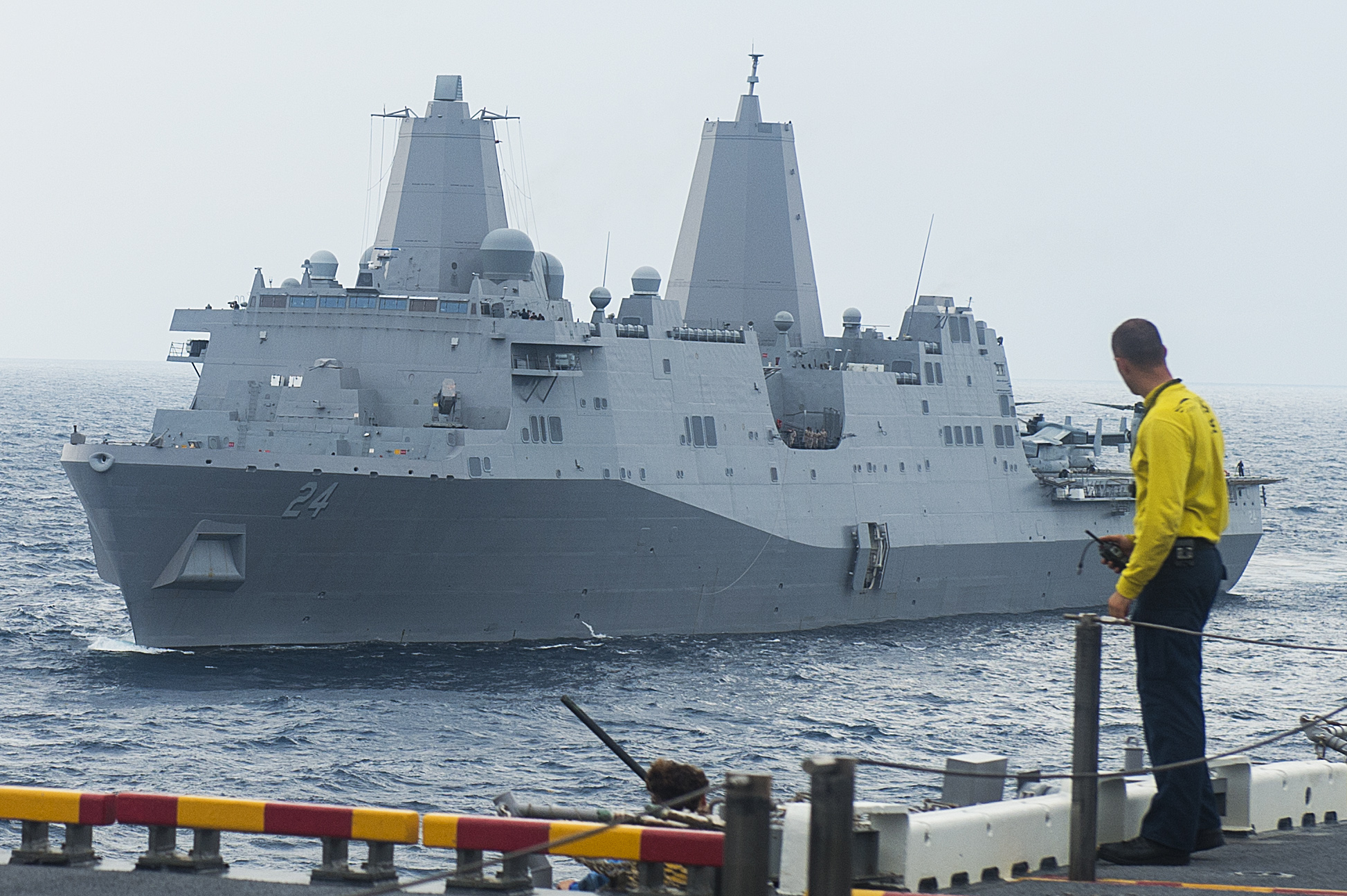
- USS Arlington in August 2013

History

United States
- Name: Arlington
- Namesake: Arlington County
- Awarded: 6 November 2006
- Builder: Ingalls Shipbuilding
- Laid down: 26 May 2008
- Launched: 23 November 2010
- Sponsored by: Mrs. Joyce Rumsfeld
- Christened: 26 March 2011
- Commissioned: 8 February 2013
- Home port: Norfolk
- Identification: MMSI number: 369970719; Callsign: NARL; Pennant number: LPD-24
- Motto: Strength Honor Fortitude
- Status: In active service, as of 2015
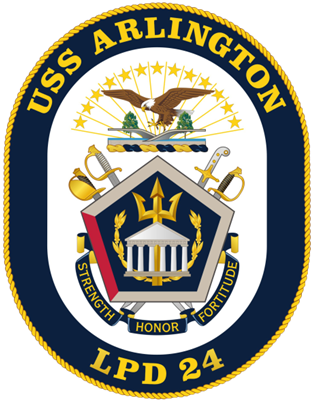
- Badge

General characteristics
- Class & type: San Antonio-class amphibious transport dock
- Displacement: 24,900 short tons (22,600 t) full
- Length: 684 ft (208 m) overall, 661 ft (201 m) waterline
- Beam: 105 ft (32 m) extreme, 97 ft (30 m) waterline
- Draft: 23 ft (7.0 m)
- Propulsion: Four sequentially turbocharged Colt-Pielstick diesel engines, two shafts, 40,000 hp (30 MW)
- Speed: 22 knots (41 km/h)
- Boats & landing craft carried: Two LCACs; or one LCU
- Capacity: 699 (66 officers, 633 enlisted); surge to 800 total; 14 Expeditionary Force vehicles
- Complement: 32 officers, 332 enlisted
- Armament: Two 30 mm Mk44 Bushmaster II close-in guns; two RIM-116 Rolling Airframe Missile launchers
- Aircraft carried: Four CH-53E Super Stallion heavy lift helicopters may be launched or recovered simultaneously.

USS Arlington (LPD-24), a San Antonio-class amphibious transport dock, is the third ship of the United States Navy to be named for Arlington County, Virginia, the location of the Pentagon and the crash site of American Airlines Flight 77 during the terrorist attacks on 11 September 2001. Like her sister ships, USS New York and Somerset, she is named in commemoration of the attacks. Steel taken from the Pentagon after the attacks is displayed aboard in the ship's Honor Room.

== Construction ==
Arlington's keel was laid down on 26 May 2008, at Northrop Grumman's Ingalls shipyard in Pascagoula, Mississippi. Builder's Trials of the ship started on 21 August 2012. These were completed on 30 August 2012. She completed Navy acceptance sea trials on 2 November 2012. The US Navy formally accepted the ship on 7 December 2012. Arlington arrived at her homeport of Naval Station Norfolk, Virginia on 22 March 2013 in preparation for commissioning. Officially, she was commissioned on 8 February 2013, but her ceremonial commissioning occurred on 6 April 2013 at Naval Station Norfolk. Originally scheduled as the third ship of the San Antonio class, she was the eighth to be commissioned. Mrs. Joyce Rumsfeld, wife of former United States Secretary of Defense Donald Rumsfeld, is the ship's sponsor.

== Operational history ==
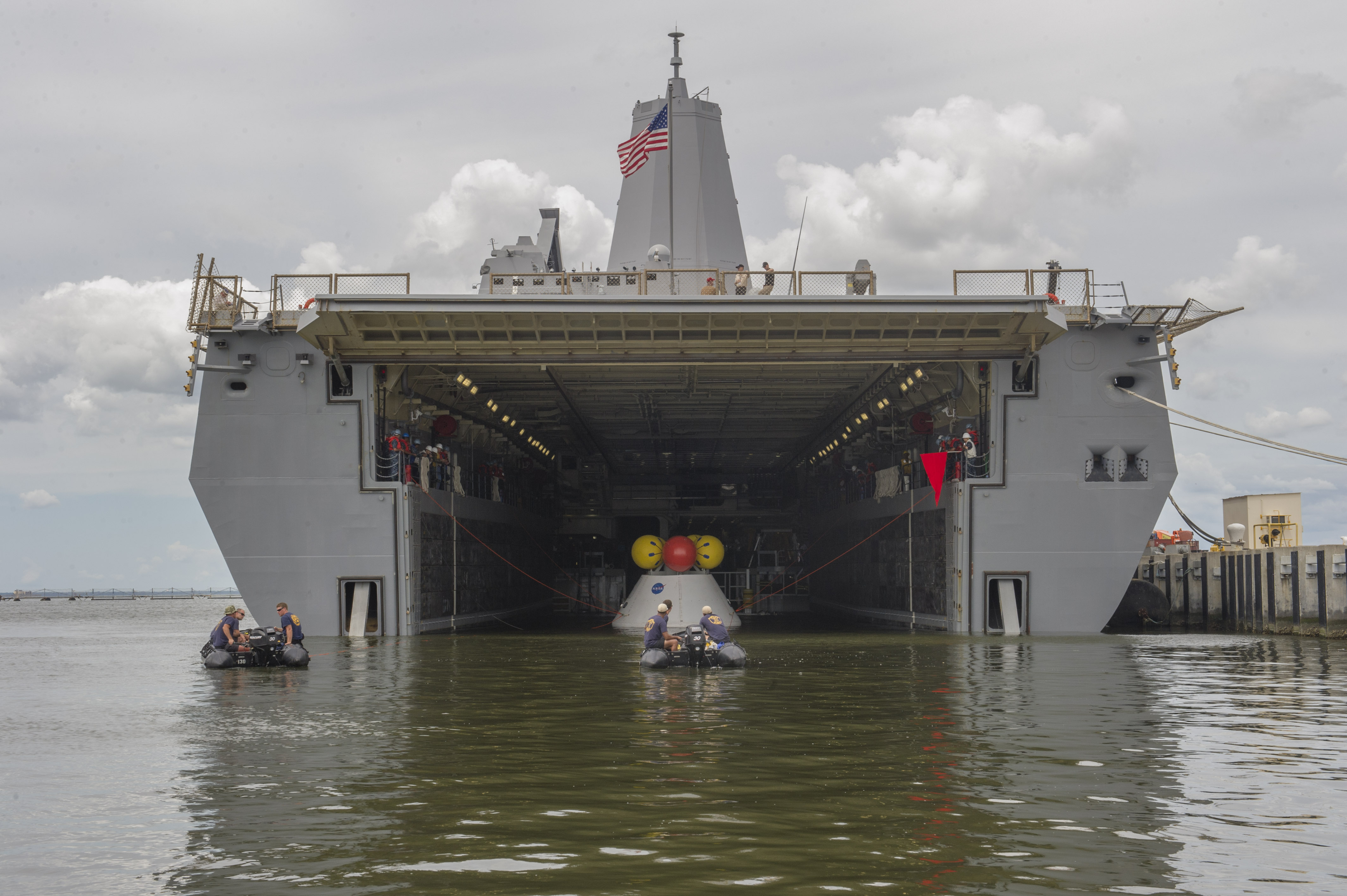
The Orion spacecraft in Arlington's well deck.

In August 2013, Arlington conducted trials with NASA's Orion spacecraft.

In October 2015, Arlington embarked upon her maiden deployment to the 5th and 6th Fleet Areas of Responsibility as part of the USS Kearsarge (LHD-3) Amphibious Ready Group, along with the 26th Marine Expeditionary Unit. During the deployment, Arlington transited 36,740 nautical miles and conducted port visits in Lisbon, Portugal, Souda Bay, Greece, Eilat, Israel, Aqaba, Jordan, Bahrain, Kuwait, Abu Dhabi, U.A.E. and Marseille, France.

The ship completed missions in both the U.S. 5th & 6th Fleet areas of operations, supporting maritime security operations (MSO) and national security interests. Arlington spent several lengthy spells on counterterrorism duty off the coast of Yemen and in the Persian Gulf. These operations coincided with the Yemeni Civil War. Throughout the deployment, Fires & Integration Coordination Element (FICE) maintained continuous coordination with Joint Combined Planning Cell (JCPC) Kingdom of Saudi Arabia to support regional maritime security operations and counter Houthi operations.

Arlington provided assistance to a disabled vessel while transiting the Gulf of Aden 23 December 2015. Embarked personnel included the Marines with Combat Logistics Battalion 26, Fox Company and Echo Battery, Battalion Landing Team 2/6, 26th Marine Expeditionary Unit (26th MEU). In March 2016 Battery E, 2nd Battalion, 6th Marine Regiment, 26th MEU disembarked Arlington to deploy ashore under Task Force Spartan, providing M777A2 artillery and counter-battery support in northern Iraq during Operation Inherent Resolve.

Following its Spring maintenance period, Arlington got underway from Naval Station Norfolk on May 18, 2017, to participate in BALTOPS 2017. The ship initially transited to Onslow Bay on May 19th to embark elements of the 2nd Assault Amphibian Battalion, 2nd Marine Division, before crossing the Atlantic. The vessel arrived at Swinoujscie, Poland on May 31st for the pre-sail and in-port planning phase of the multinational exercise.

From June 4 to June 16, the Arlington operated in a heavily contested, live-fire environment during the active, at-sea free-play phase of BALTOPS 2017. Designed to practice high-end warfare and amphibious integration against regional threats, the exercise took place amidst heightened Baltic tensions and documented encounters with aggressive Russian aircraft intercepts targeting NATO assets. During this tactical phase, Vice Admiral Christopher Grady, Commander, STRIKFORNATO, utilized the Arlington as a central hub for commanding power projection operations, leading coordinated amphibious landings across Vilnius, Lithuania; Putlos, Germany; and Ustka, Poland.

Following the conclusion of active maneuvers, the Arlington moored at Tirpitzhafen Naval Base in Kiel, Germany, from June 16 to June 19 for the official completion phase and a public open-ship weekend. On its return transit across the Atlantic, the ship made a final commemorative port visit off Brest, France, on June 22 to honor the centennial of the United States' entry into World War I before returning to its homeport.

In May 2019 she was deployed to the Persian Gulf due to reported concerns about Iranian activities. In April 2022 Arlington was deployed to Icelandic waters to take part in the NATO exercise Northern Viking 2022.
