= ICGV Þór (2009) =

Ship

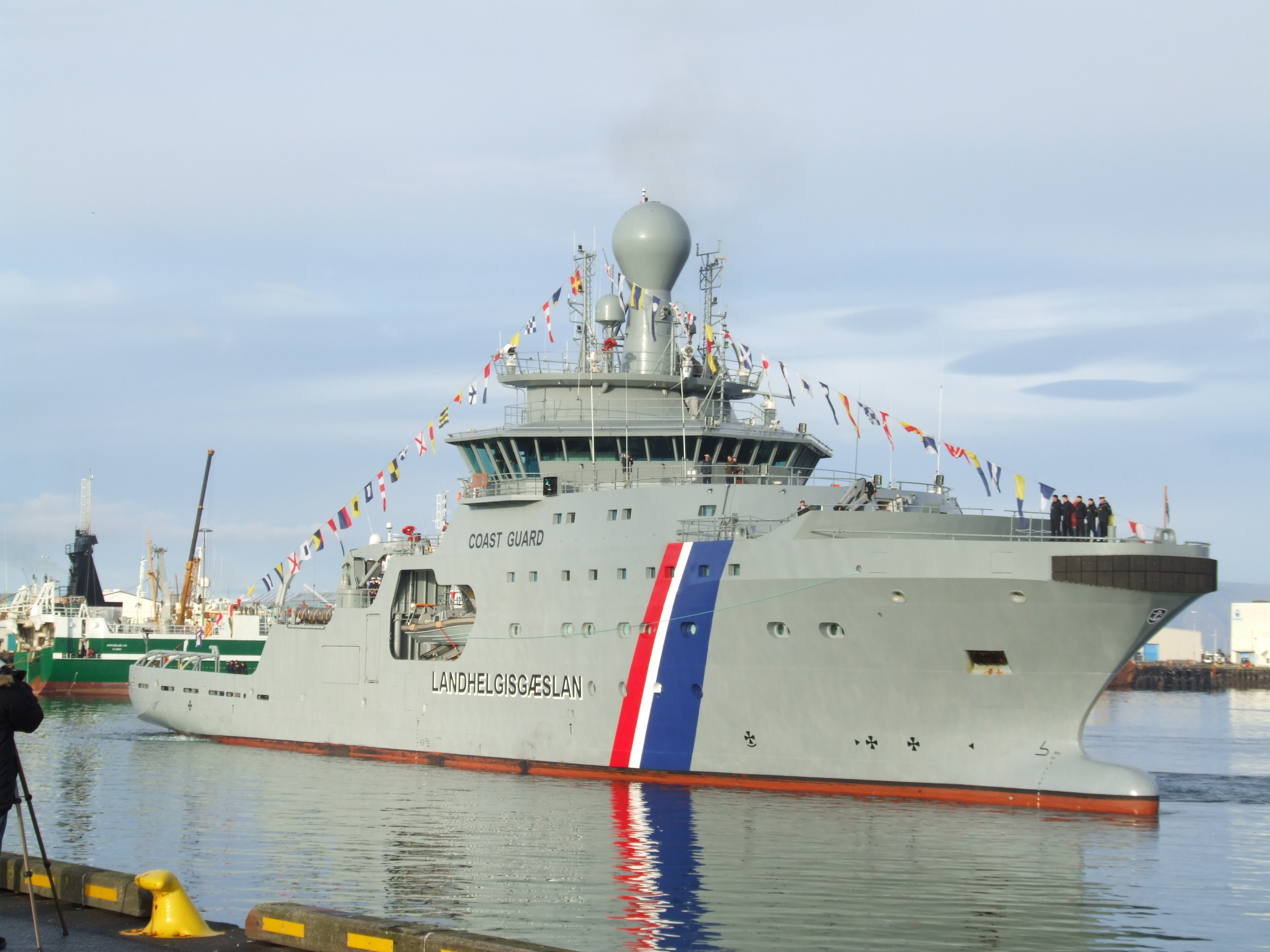
- ICGV Þór arriving at the port of Reykjavík on 27 October 2011

History

Iceland
- Name: Þór
- Namesake: Thor
- Ordered: 2006
- Builder: ASMAR, Talcahuano, Chile
- Laid down: 2008
- Launched: 29 April 2009
- Commissioned: 23 September 2011
- In service: 2011–
- Identification: IMO number: 9426893; MMSI number: 251604000; Callsign: TFIA

General characteristics
- Class & type: Rolls-Royce Marine AS "UT 512 L" type offshore patrol vessel
- Tonnage: 4,049 GT
- Length: 93.80 m (307.7 ft)
- Beam: 16 m (52 ft)
- Height: 30 m (98 ft)
- Draught: 5.80 m (19.0 ft)
- Installed power: 2 × 4,500 kW Bergen Engines diesel
- Propulsion: 2 × 450 kW bow tunnel thrusters and one in the aft; 883 kW retractable azimuth thruster
- Speed: 20.1 knots (37.2 km/h; 23.1 mph)
- Boats & landing craft carried: 2 MOB boats
- Complement: 48
- Sensors & processing systems: 1 × S-band radar, 2 × X-band radar; Synthetic aperture sonar
- Armament: 1 × Bofors 40 mm L/60 gun
- Aviation facilities: Helicopter in-flight refuelling capabilities (HIFR). 1 Schiebel Camcopter S-100 unmanned rotory wing surveillance vehicle
- Notes: Bollard pull: 120 t (132.3 st)

ICGV Þór (Thor) is an UT 512L type offshore patrol vessel designed by Rolls-Royce for the Icelandic Coast Guard. It was built to replace the aging ICGV Óðinn. The construction of the ship was approved by the Icelandic government on 4 March, 2005. Construction of the ship began at the ASMAR Naval Shipyard in Talcahuano, Chile, on 16 October 2007. Construction was delayed by over a year due to the 2010 Chilean earthquake, but damage to the structure of the ship was not as detrimental as had been expected. After repairs, the ICGV Þór was delivered to ICG personnel on 23 September 2011 in Chile. She arrived in Reykjavík on 27 October 2011. Its main tasks are EEZ patrol, fishery inspection and search and rescue support. The ship is named after the Norse god Thor.

== Origins ==
The origins of the ship date back to 4 March 2005, in a proposal drafted by then-Minister of Justice and Ecclesiastical Affairs (which is now a nonexistent entity), Björn Bjarnason, regarding the purchase of a new vessel, in order to replace the aging ICGV Óðinn, and aircraft for the Icelandic Coast Guard. The Althing decided that this was an exigent matter, and so a high priority was placed upon the proposal. A needs analysis pertaining to the acquisition of a multi-purpose vessel and aircraft for the ICG was initiated on 31 September 2005. The main demands were that the vessel should be designed for rescue work and patrolling, pollution prevention, fuelling search and rescue helicopters, and meeting civil defence requirements anywhere around the country. In addition, it was to be equipped for response to, and prevention of, terrorist threats and be suitable for operations involving the police or customs authorities, and for all types of rescue and salvage work. The bollard pull of the vessel was to take account of the greatly increased volume of passenger and cargo shipping in Iceland's economic zone and coastal waters.

== Construction ==
Bids for the construction of the ship were open to application and submission at the State Trading Centre. After processing through the STC, the bids were to be submitted dually to the Ministry of Justice and Ecclesiastical Affairs and the ICG. 15 bids were received from 12 countries. The winning bid was the second bid of ASMAR, Chile's largest shipbuilding corporation. The contract for the construction of the new vessel was signed on 20 December 2006 by Björn, Árni M. Mathiesen, Minister of Finance, and Georg Kr. Lárusson, Director of the ICG, and Carlos Fanta de la Vega, Rear Admiral of the Chilean Navy and Director of the ASMAR Naval Shipyard. Construction commenced on 16 October 2007. The ship was launched on 29 April 2009 at a ceremony in the ASMAR Naval Shipyard in Talcahuano. The then-unnamed vessel received the official name Þór, or Thor, after the god Thor.

=== Design ===
ICGV Þór's design is concurrent with that of the Norwegian Coast Guard's Harstad; in fact, both vessels were designed by Rolls-Royce plc. During its design stage, Harstad was designated as model number UT 512, while the larger version, which became the Þór, was designated as model number UT 512L. The vessel is powered by two Rolls-Royce Marine Bergen diesel engines. The ship's propellers are two Rolls-Royce Marine KaMeWa Ulstein feathering propellers (feathering propellers are rotated parallel to the water flow in order to reduce drag). The ship is 93.8 metres (308 feet) long overall, a 16 metres (52 feet) wide, and a has a height of 30 metres (98 feet). The maximum speed of the vessel is 19.5 knots (36.1 km/h; 22.4 mph), while its towing capacity, or bollard pull, is 120 tonnes (120 long tons; 130 short tons). The cargo deck covers 300 square metres (3,200 sq ft). The vessel is outfitted with various life-saving equipment, designed to aid it in rescue missions, including two MOB boats and six Viking life rafts. Other specially designed equipment the vessel is outfitted with includes oil booms, one 40 mm Bofors gun, and oil skimmers.

=== 2010 tsunami incident ===
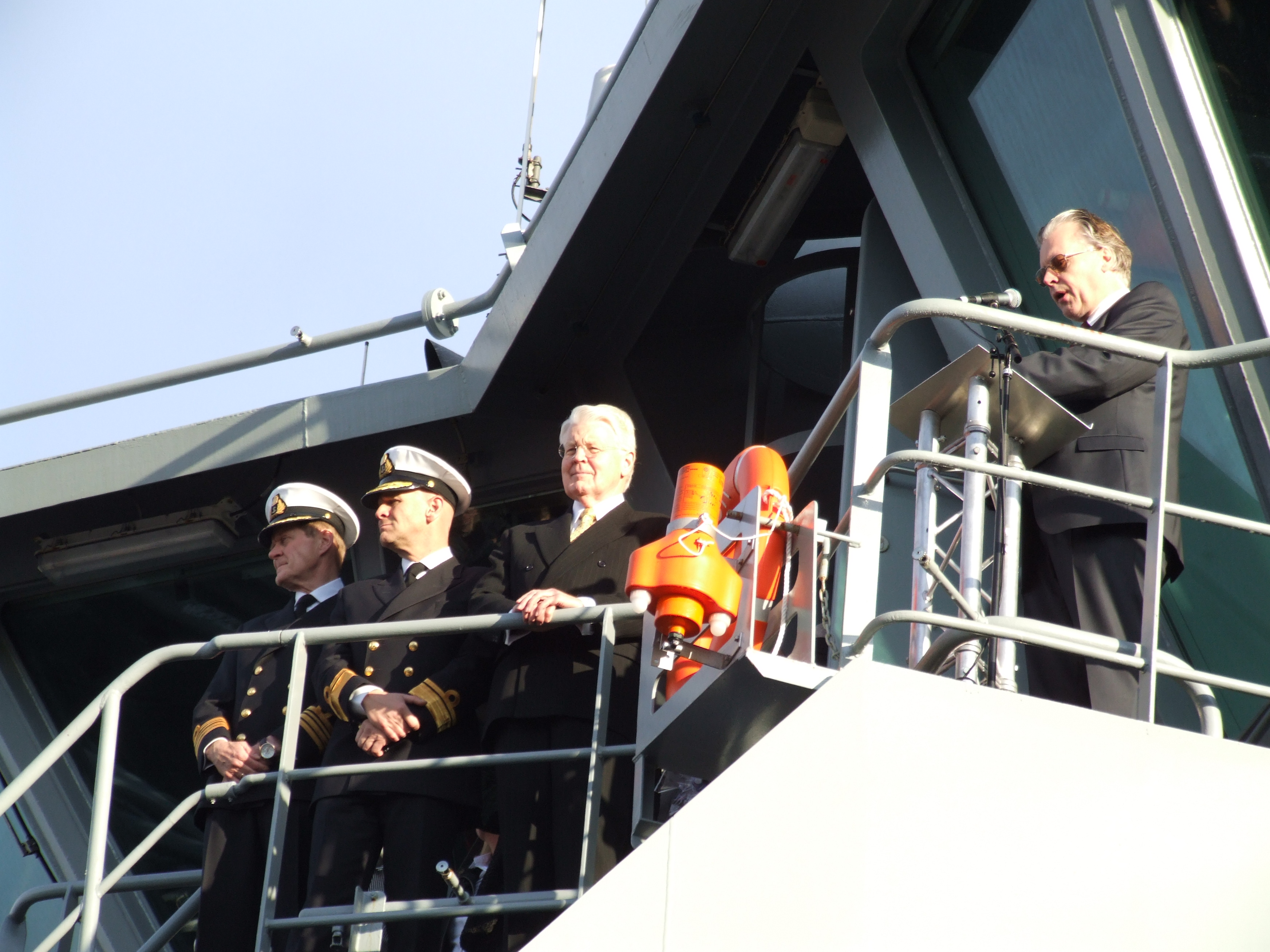
Cdr. s.g. Sigurður Steinar Ketilsson, Captain; Director of the Icelandic Coast Guard, R.Adm. Georg Kr. Lárusson; President of Iceland, Mr. Ólafur Ragnar Grímsson; and former Minister of the Interior, Ögmundur Jónasson; welcomes Þór to Reykjavík.

In 2010, a magnitude 8.8 earthquake struck Chile, forming an immense tsunami that left a deadly wake along the Chilean coastline. It was feared that ICGV Þór would have been damaged beyond repair in the disaster, as the shipyard itself was known to have incurred massive damage. Despite the odds, the ship had sustained minimal damage. After being placed in dry dock for minor repairs, the vessel was delivered, albeit more than a year late.

== Delivery ==
After being fully repaired following the earthquake and the ensuing tsunami, ICGV Þór was delivered to ICG authorities and personnel at the ASMAR shipyard on 23 September 2011. The ship then embarked on the voyage to Reykjavík harbour, and was slated to arrive in late October of the same year. After making stops in cities such as Halifax, Nova Scotia, the ship finally arrived in Reykjavík on 27 October 2011. The vessel maintains a complement (number of personnel on board the ship) of 48.

On 11 June 2015, Þór was rammed and damaged by Kruzenshtern at Reykjavík.

== Gallery ==
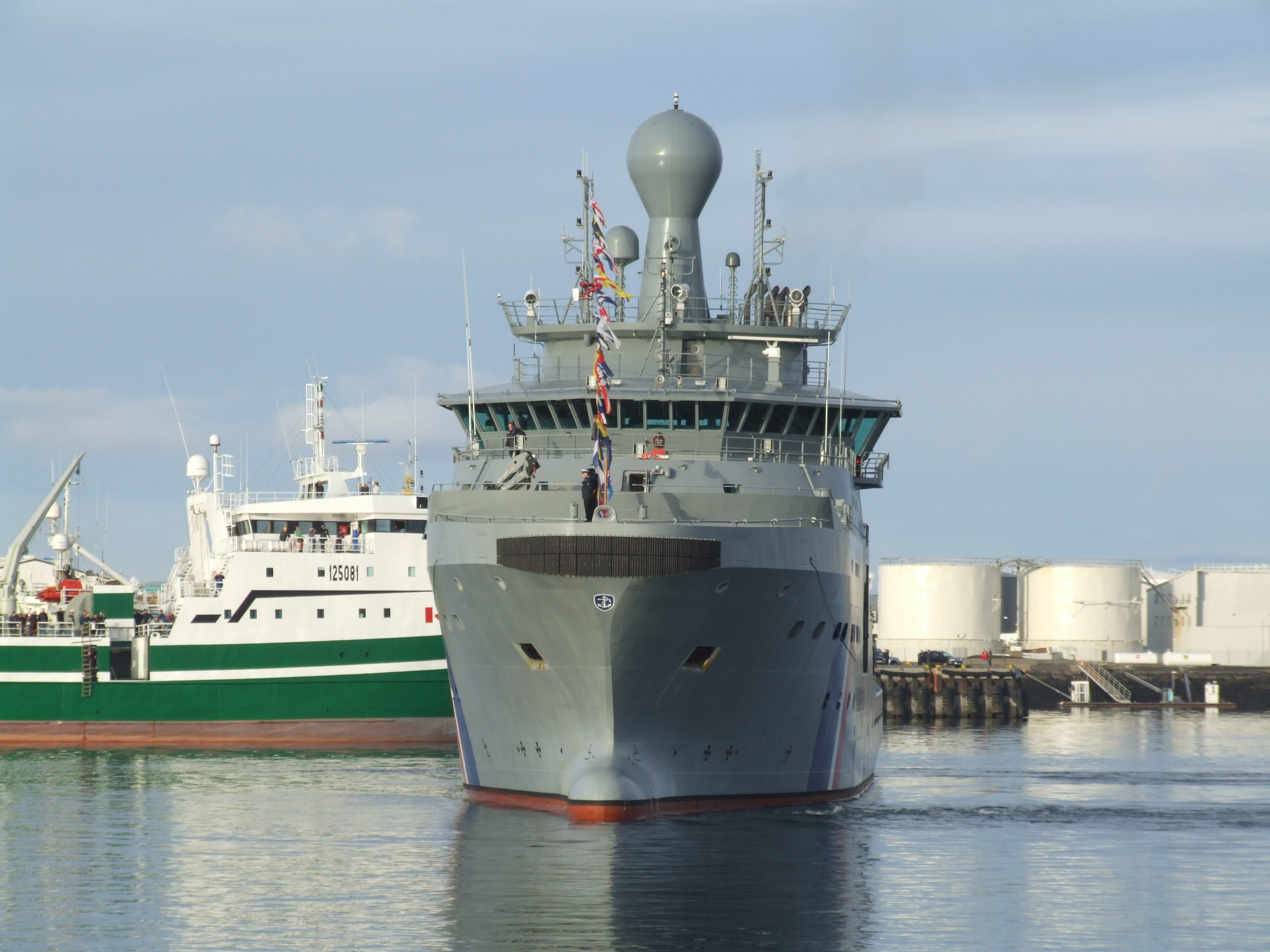
Arrival in Reykjavík

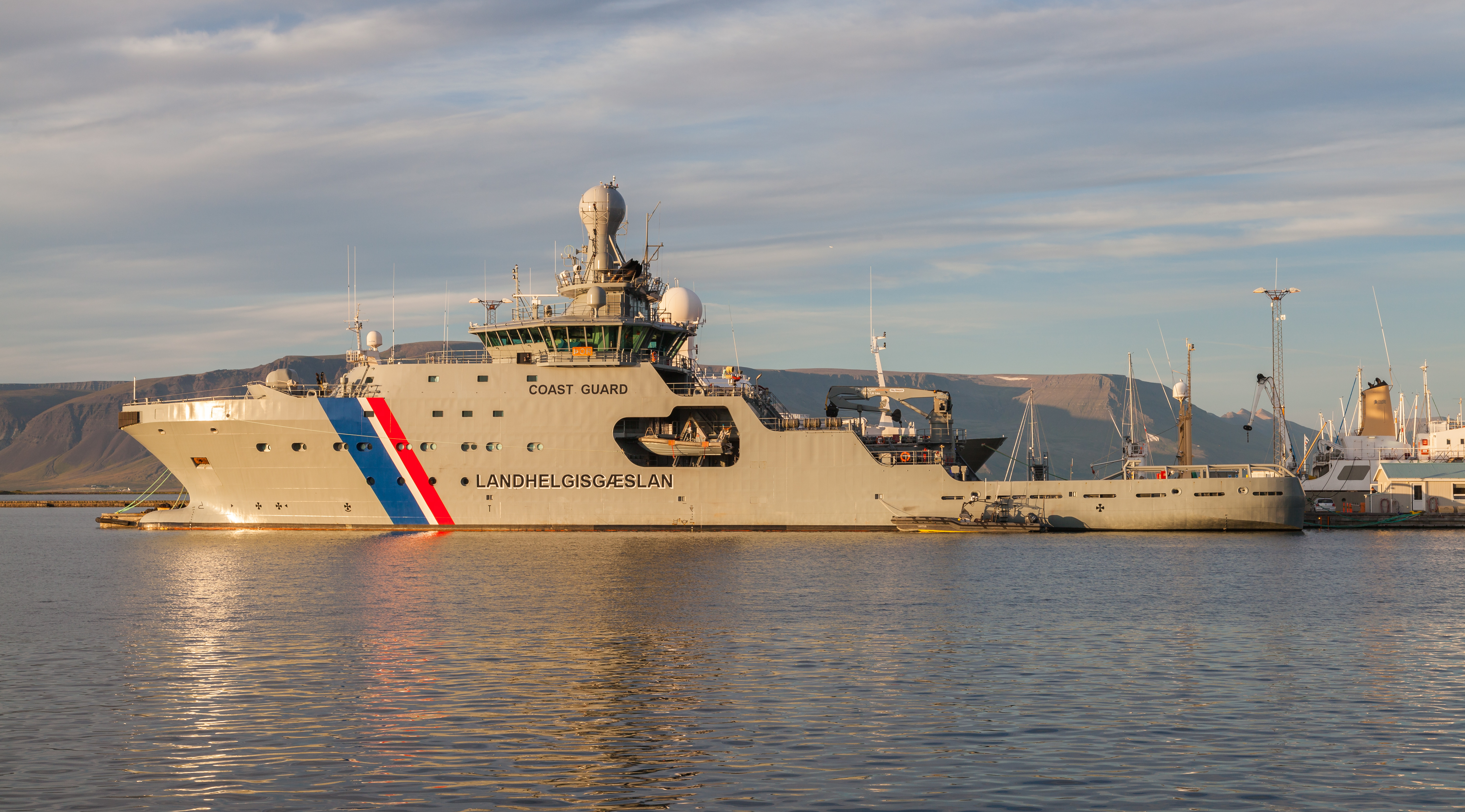
Side view of the vessel

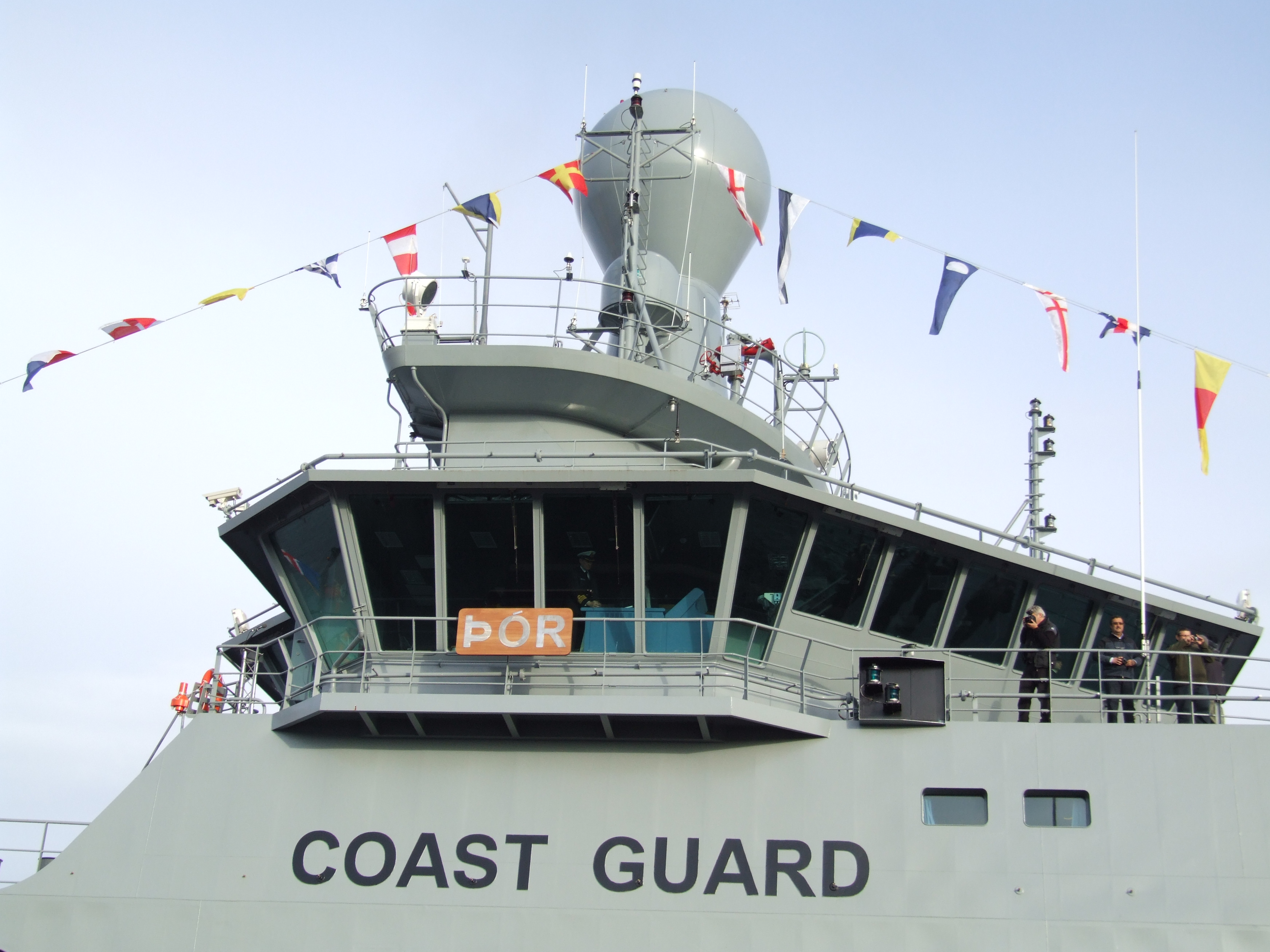
The vessel's Bridge

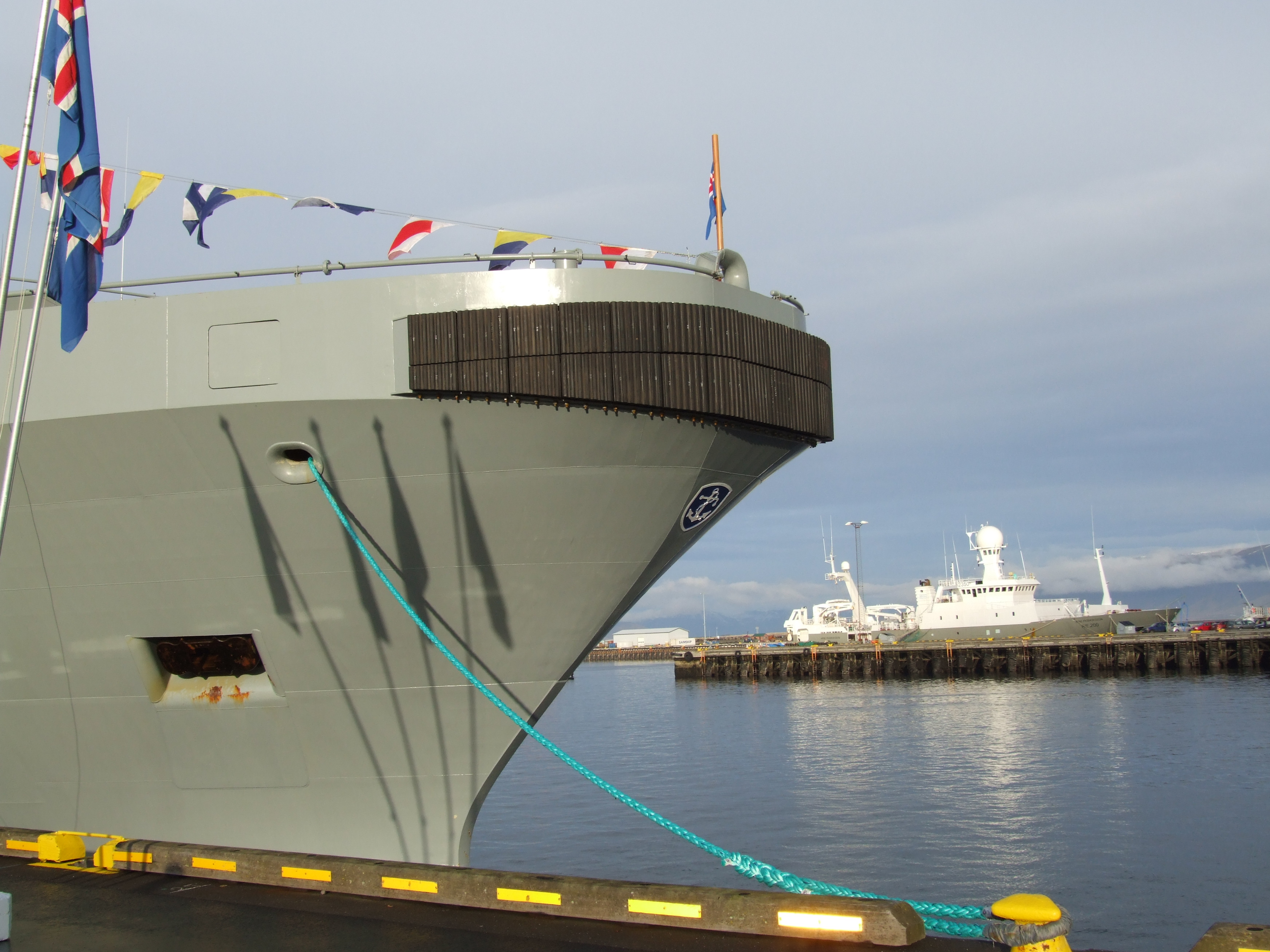
Bow of the vessel

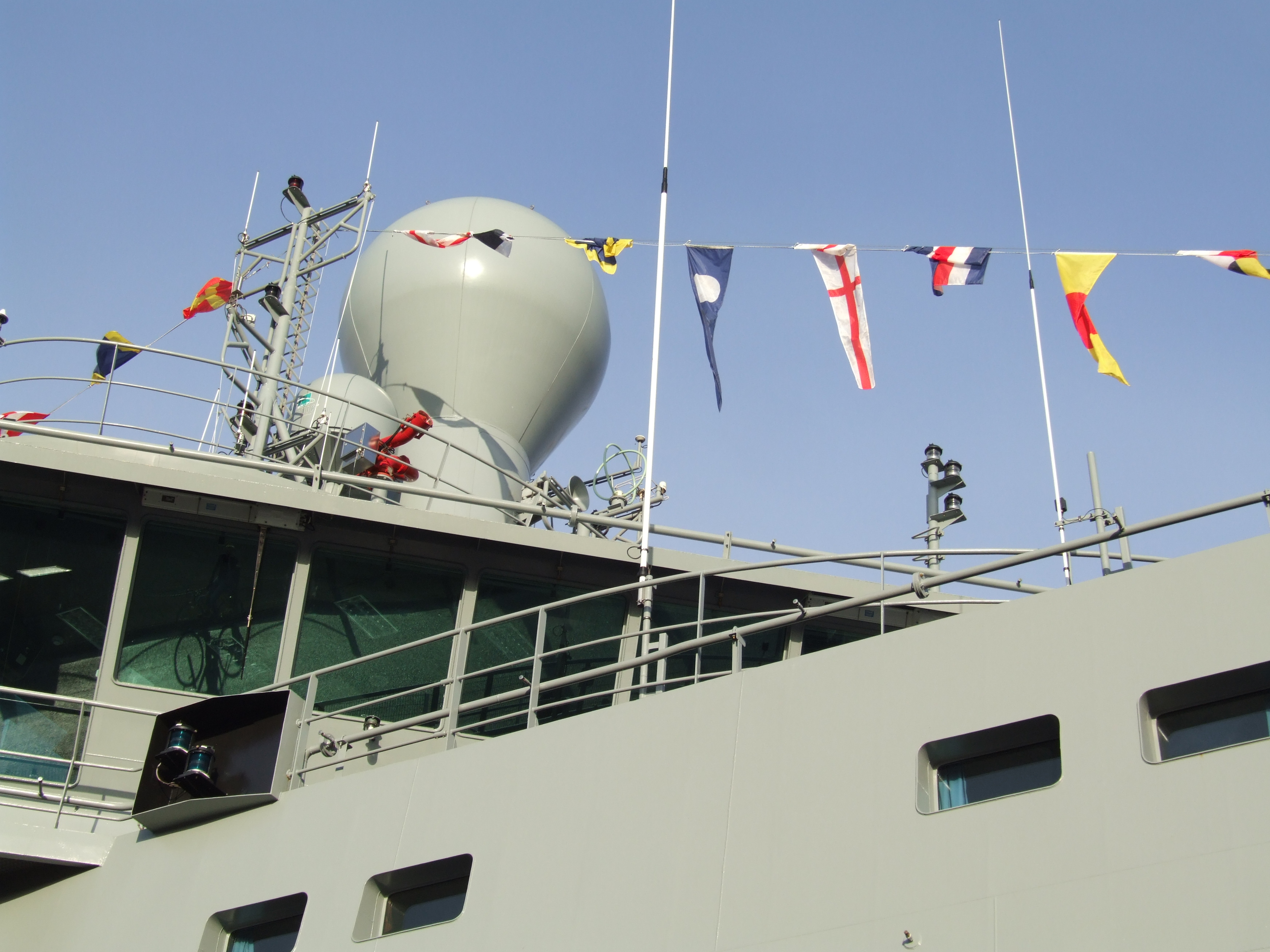
Another view of the vessel

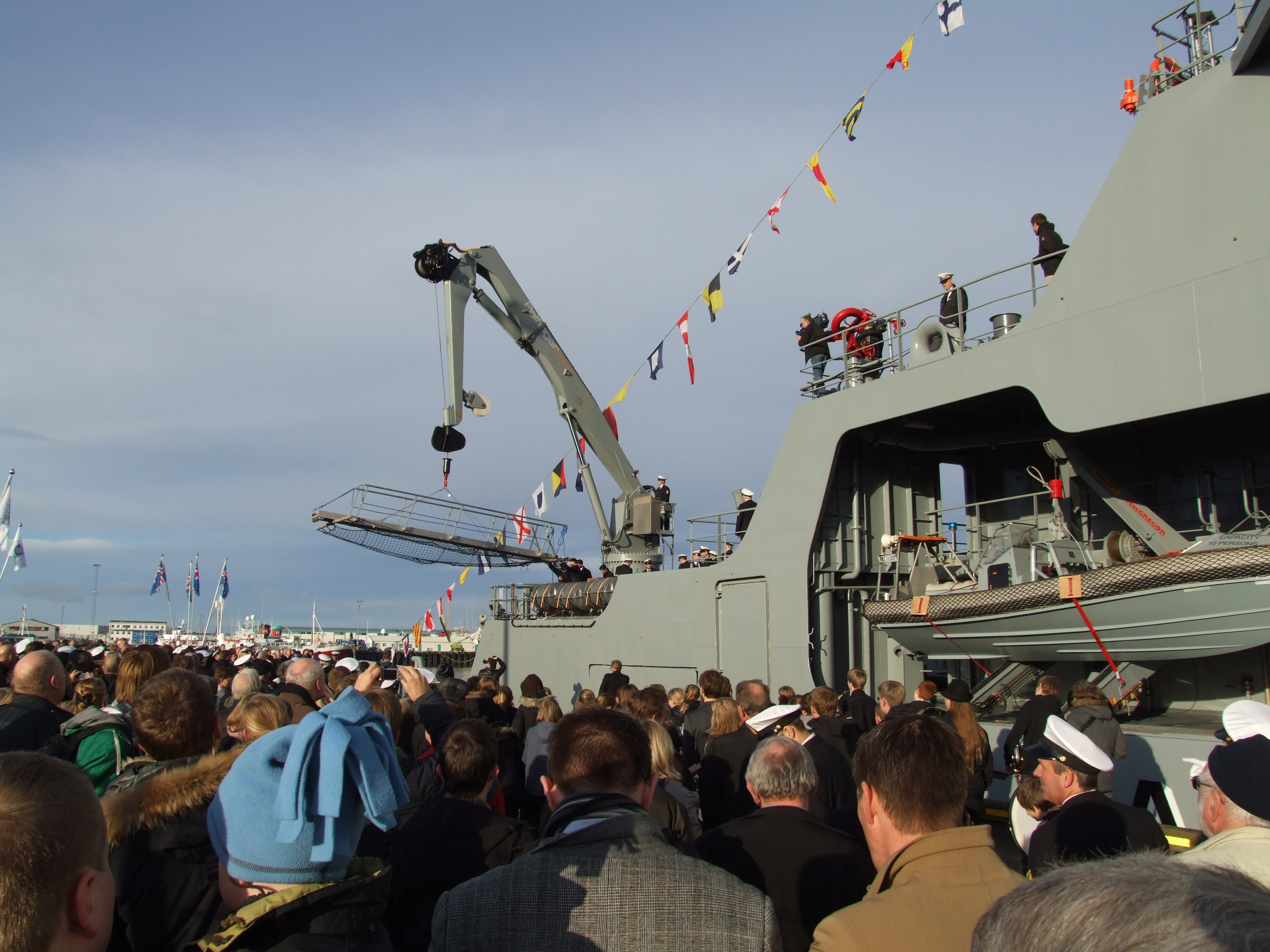
The vessel's arrival in Reykjavík

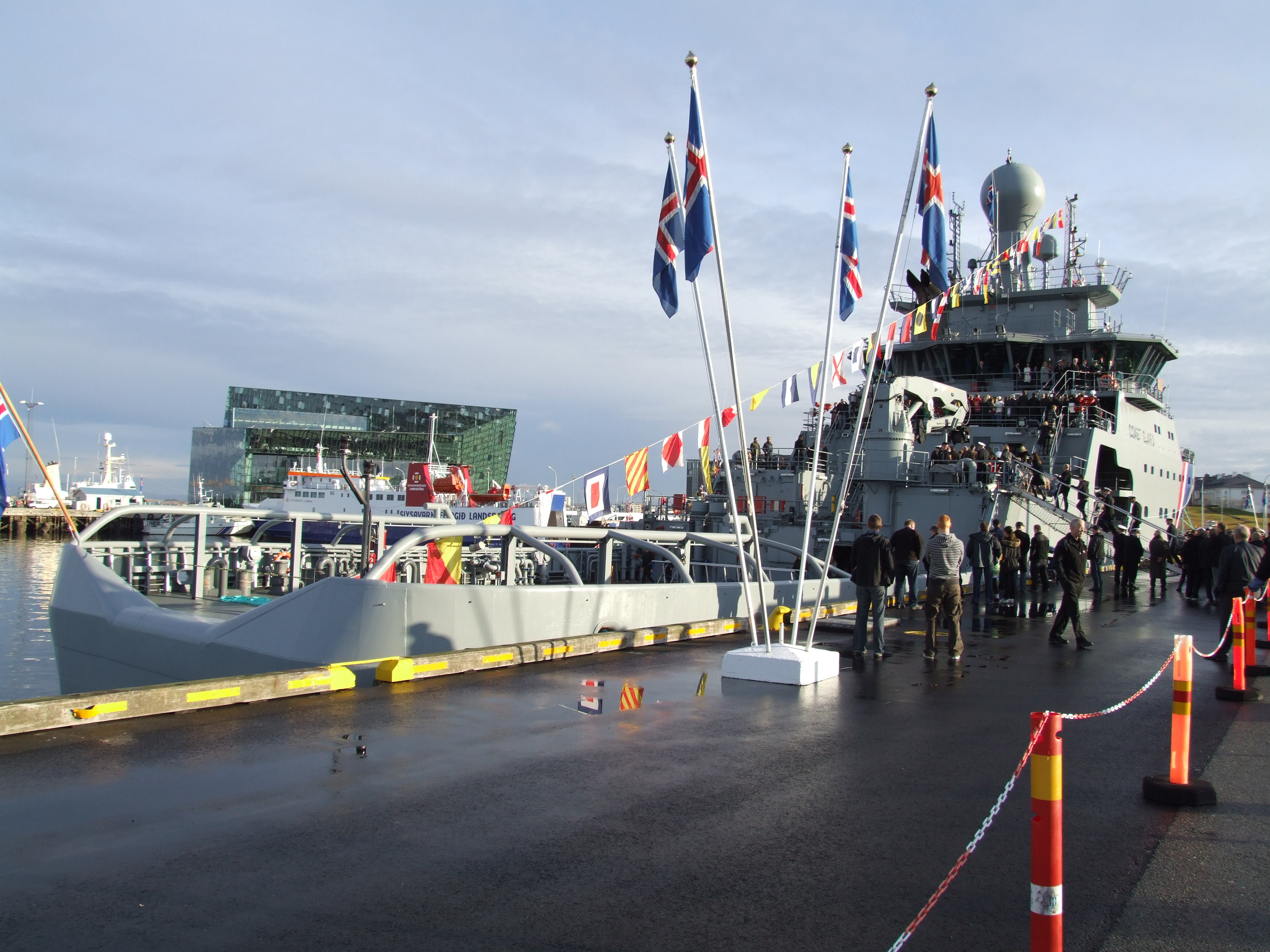
Ship arriving in Reykjavík

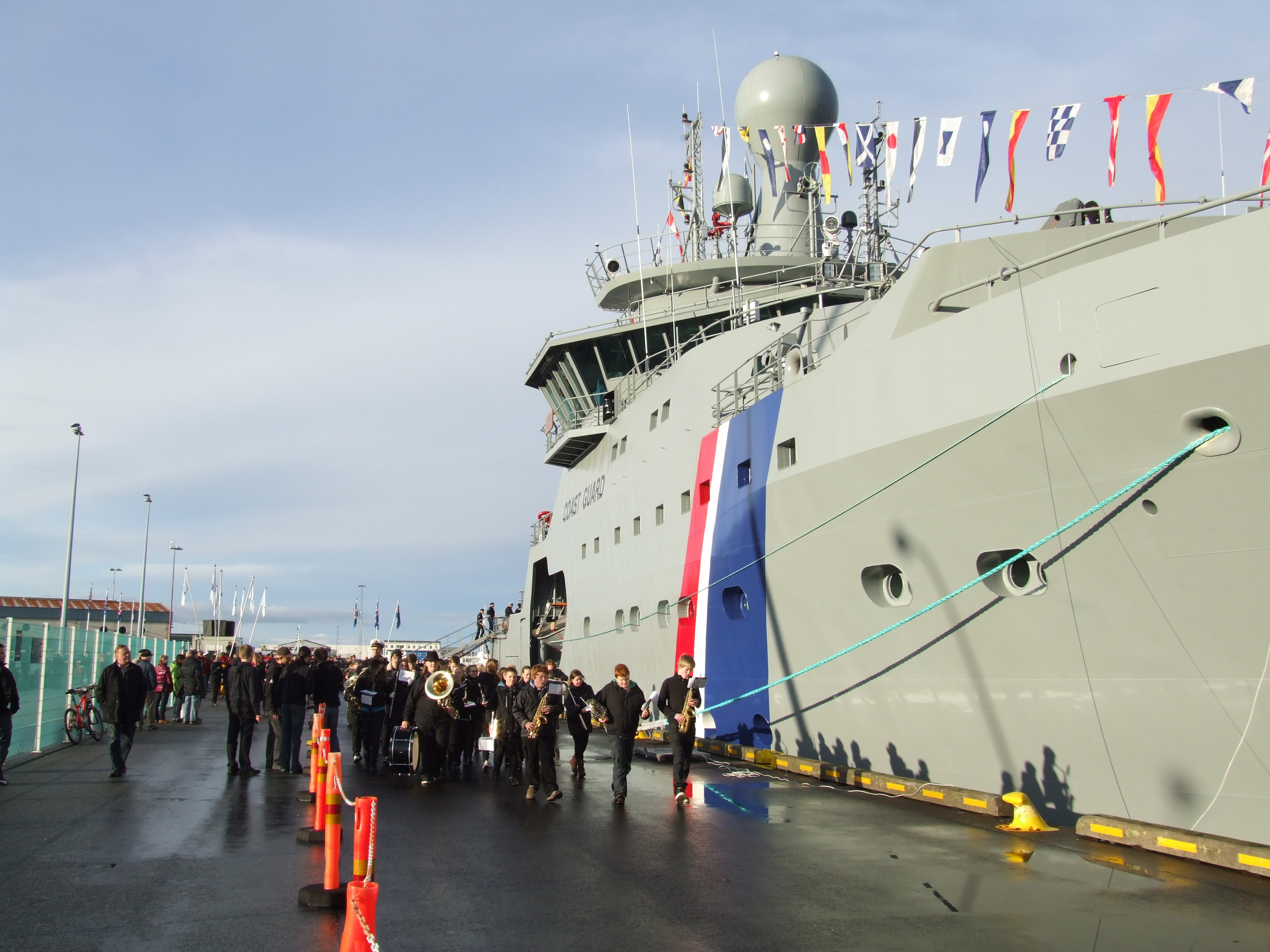
Another side view of the vessel

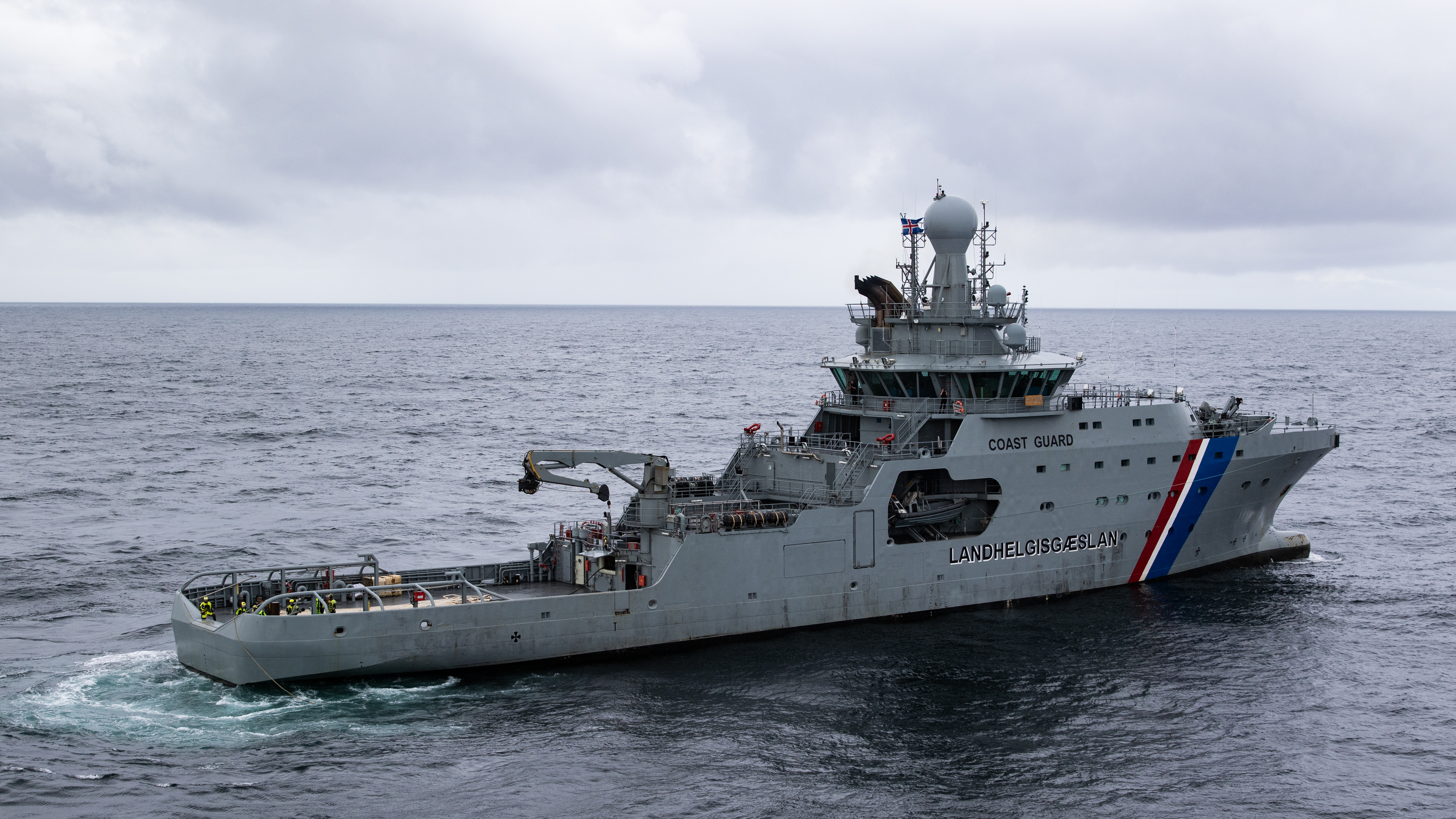
The vessel during Operation Tugaalik on 24 June 2024
