= ICGV Baldur (1973) =

Coast guard vessel

History

Iceland
- Name: Baldur
- Launched: 6 December 1973
- Commissioned: 1975
- Decommissioned: 1977
- Fate: Transferred to the IMFRI and renamed Hafþór

General characteristics
- Class & type: Naval trawler
- Displacement: 740 t
- Length: 60.0 m (196 ft 10 in)
- Beam: 11.0 m (36 ft 1 in)
- Complement: 23

ICGV Baldur was a naval trawler of the Icelandic Coast Guard. The second coast guard ship to bear the name, it served in the third Cod Wars conflict between Iceland and the United Kingdom. Due to its sharp stern, Baldur could inflict heavy damage on British ships colliding with its stern section and knocked out three frigates during the conflict.

== History ==
Baldur was built in Poland as a stern trawler for a fishing company in Dalvík and arrived in Iceland in June 1974. A year later, the Icelandic government bought the ship to use as a science vessel.

=== Cod Wars ===
In December 1975, Baldur was transferred to the Icelandic Coast Guard and converted to an armed trawler to serve in the third Cod Wars conflict against the United Kingdom under captain Höskuldur Skarphéðinsson. Its main purpose was to cut the nets of British trawlers fishing inside the 200-nautical-mile (370-kilometre) exclusive fishery zone claimed by Iceland. To hinder the Icelandic Coast Guard, the United Kingdom deployed several frigates and tugboats to intercept the coast guard ships. On 12 February 1976, Baldur was chased by HMS Diomede before being rammed by the frigate, damaging both vessels. On 28 February HMS Yarmouth collided with Baldur's stern, severely damaging the frigate's bow, and forcing her to leave the patrol area assisted by the Royal Maritime Auxiliary Service tug Rollicker. Yarmouth underwent repairs at Chatham, where she was fitted with a new bow section. On 10 March, after having evaded several collision attempts by HMS Mermaid, Baldur collided Diomede and suffered moderate damage. On 26 March, HMS Galatea collided with Baldur's stern, damaging the frigate's bow. The following day, Baldur faced Diomede once again. This time the frigate was severely damaged after colliding with Baldur's stern, with over 6-metre (20 ft) long tear opening on its port side, knocking it out of the conflict. Following the collision, Galatea arrived at the scene with its guns manned and warned Baldur from further interacting with the British fishing fleet. Galatea, along with HMS Juno and the tugboat Lloydsman then chased Baldur until it reached the 12 nautical-mile exclusive zone. On 6 May, Mermaid, Galatea and the tugboat Statesman attempted to ram Baldur. After Mermaid managed to hit Baldur, the trawler hit back with its stern, ripping up a 1.5-metre (4 ft 11 in)-long hole on the frigate's side. On 22 May, Baldur and HMS Eastbourne were involved in a collision, damaging both ships and making Eastbourne no longer seaworthy.

=== Later career ===
On 24 May 1977, the ship was transferred to the Ministry of Fisheries. where it was renamed Hafþór and retrofitted for research purposes under the Icelandic Marine & Freshwater Research Institute. In 1984, it was converted into a freezer trawler and leased to a shrimp processing in Ísafjörður. In July 1988, the ship was caught illegally fishing inside the Greenland exclusive fishery zone. In 1990, a fishing company in Ísafjörður bought the ship and renamed it Skutull ÍS 180. It later served various companies until 2013. In 2020, the ship was sold for scrap.

== In television ==
In 2020, the ship served as a setting in the Icelandic television mystery drama Trapped.

== See also ==
- ICGV Baldur (III)
