= ICGV Ægir (1929) =

Icelandic Coast Guard patrol vessel

History

Iceland
- Name: Ægir
- Namesake: Ægir
- Builder: Burmeister & Wain, Denmark
- Launched: 25 April 1929
- Commissioned: 1929
- Decommissioned: 1968
- Identification: Callsign: TFEA
- Fate: Scrapped in 1968

General characteristics
- Propulsion: 1 × B&W diesel engine
- Speed: 13 knots (24 km/h; 15 mph)

ICGV Ægir was an offshore patrol vessel of the Icelandic Coast Guard built by Burmeister & Wain, in Denmark in 1929. It was named after Ægir, the personification of the sea in Norse mythology. The ship entered service in July 1929 and participated in the first of the Cod Wars against the United Kingdom. Ægir primarily conducted patrols, search and rescue, fishery inspections, research and nautical surveying operations in the Icelandic exclusive economic zone. On Christmas Day 1950 she pulled the British trawler Northern Spray off after she went aground on 9 December off Isafjordur. With the arrival of new Ægir in 1968, the ship was decommissioned and sold for scrap.

Ægir was the sister ship of the Danish research vessel Dana.
