= ICGV Þór (1926) =

Ship

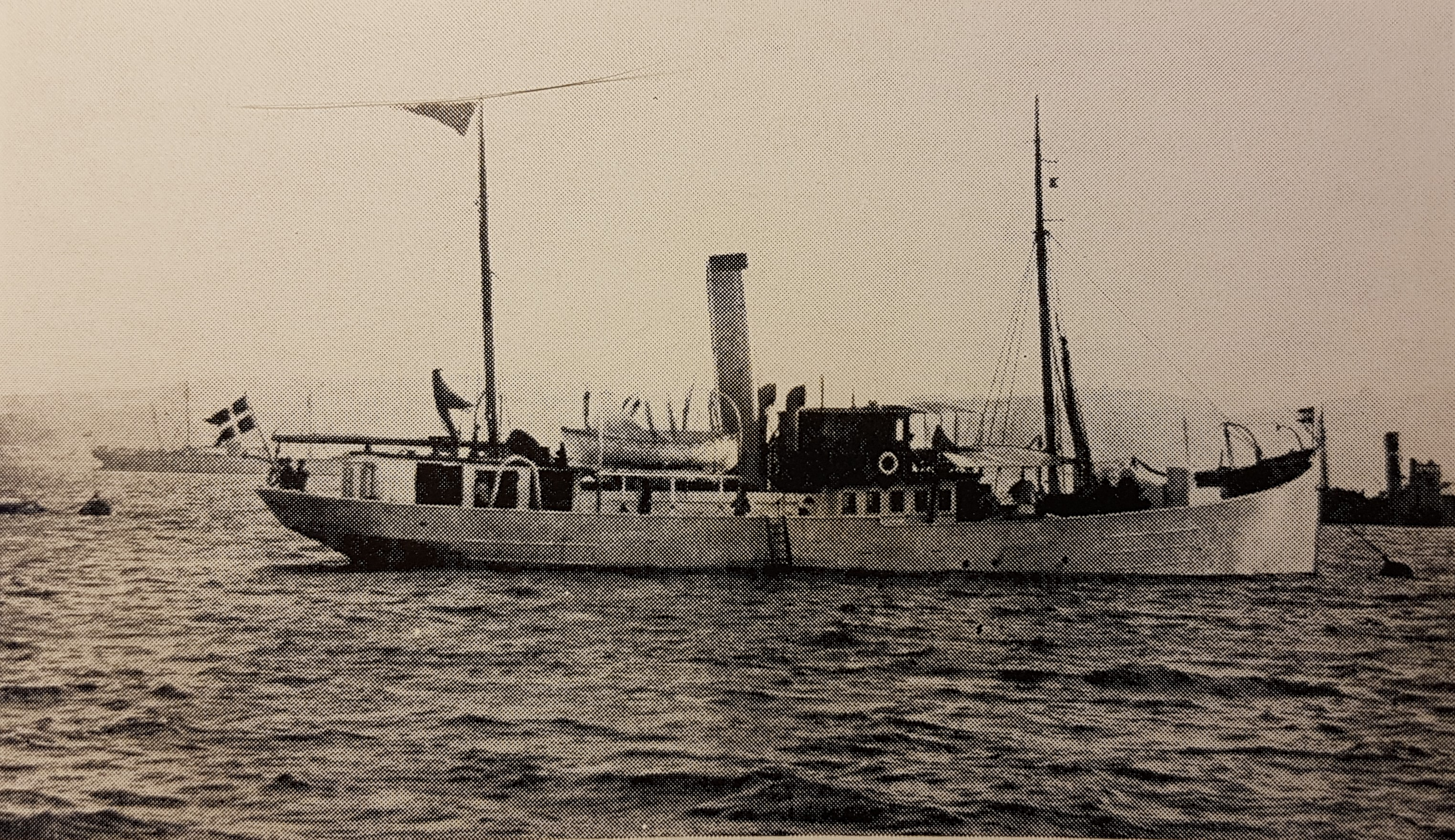
- Þór while in Danish service

History

Iceland
- Name: Þór
- Operator: Björgunarfélag Vestmannaeyja
- Builder: Edwards Brothers, North Shields, England
- Launched: 1899
- Acquired: 1920
- In service: 1920–1926
- Fate: Sold to the Icelandic Government on 1 July 1926

Iceland
- Name: ICGV Þór
- Operator: Icelandic Coast Guard
- Acquired: 1 July 1926
- In service: 1926–1929
- Fate: Wrecked in Húnaflói during a storm on 21 December 1929

General characteristics
- Type: Steam trawler
- Tonnage: 190 BT / 71 NT
- Length: 115.3 ft (35.1 m)
- Beam: 21.3 ft (6.5 m)
- Draught: 11 ft (3.4 m)
- Decks: 1
- Propulsion: 325 hp (242 kW) triple expansion steam engine, G.T. Grey, South Shields, 1 x screw
- Notes: Rigged as trawler

ICGV Þór was the first patrol ship of the Icelandic Coast Guard. It was named after the nordic mythology god Þór. She was built by Edwards Brothers at North Shields, England in 1899 as a steam trawler for Danish-Icelandic trade and fishing association in Geirseyri and later served as a research ship for Denmark. In 1920, Björgunarfélag Vestmannaeyja bought the ship for use in fishing control and rescue work. After paying for its operational cost for several years, the Icelandic government decided to buy the ship in 1926. With its purchase, the Icelandic Coast Guard was de facto established. In the early years, the ship was armed with two 57 mm cannons, which were later replaced by one 47 mm cannon. Þór ran aground at Húnaflói during a storm on 21 December 1929. As a result, it was decided to buy a new patrol vessel in its place.

== Danish service ==
Thor served as a Danish research vessel from 1903 to 1920, conducting hydrographic and oceanographic research in the North Atlantic and the Mediterranean and helped locate the spawning grounds of the Icelandic cod.
