= Icelandic Coast Guard =

Icelandic Coast Guard Landhelgisgæsla Íslands
- Icelandic Coast Guard insignia

- Racing stripe

- Ensign and roundel
- Common name: Gæslan (The Guard)
- Abbreviation: LHG
- Motto: Við erum til taks Always Prepared

Agency overview
- Formed: 1 July 1926
- Employees: 280 officers and enlisted

Jurisdictional structure
- Operations jurisdiction: Iceland
- Constituting instrument: Icelandic Coast Guard Act
- Specialist jurisdiction: Coastal patrol, marine border protection, marine search and rescue

Operational structure
- Agency executives: RADM Georg Kr. Lárusson, General Director; CDRE Ásgrímur L. Ásgrímsson, Chief of Operations; CAPT Auðunn F Kristinsson, Chief of Maritime Division; CDR sg Bjarni Á. Sigurðsson, Chief of Aeronautical Division; CAPT Jón B Guðnason, Chief of Defence Division

Facilities
- Boats: 2 x Patrol vessels 2 x Patrol/survey boat
- Patrol aircraft: 1 Bombardier DHC-8-Q314
- Transport aircraft: 3 Airbus H225s

Notables
- Significant operation: Cod Wars

Website
- lhg.is

The Icelandic Coast Guard (Icelandic: Landhelgisgæsla Íslands, Landhelgisgæslan or simply Gæslan) is the Icelandic defence service responsible for search and rescue, maritime safety and security surveillance, national defense, and law enforcement.

The nautical division is based at the port of Reykjavík, as well as a smaller base at Siglufjörður. Its aeronautical division is based at Reykjavík Airport.

The Coast Guard is also responsible for the NATO area at Keflavík Airport and the Iceland Air Defence System, which conducts ground-based surveillance of Iceland's air space.

The Icelandic Coast Guard is also responsible for hydrographic surveying and nautical charting in Icelandic waters.

== History ==
Its origins can be traced to 1859, when the corvette Ørnen started patrolling Icelandic waters. In 1906, Iceland's first purposely built guard-ship, Islands Falk, began operation. Iceland's own defense of its territorial waters began around 1920 and the Icelandic Coast Guard was formally founded on 1 July 1926. The first cannon was put on the trawler Þór in 1924 and on 23 June 1926 the first ship built for the Coast Guard, named Óðinn, arrived in Iceland. Three years later, on 14 July 1929 the coastal defence ship Ægir was added to the Coast Guard fleet.

=== Cod Wars ===
The Icelandic Coast Guard played its largest role during the fishing rights dispute known as the Cod Wars, between 1972 and 1976, when the Coast Guard ships would cut the trawl wires of British and West German trawlers, resulting in confrontations with Royal Navy warships and tugs from the British Ministry of Agriculture, Fisheries and Food (MAFF). The Icelandic Coast Guard goal was to enforce a disputed expansion of Iceland's exclusive economic zone. Engagements between Icelandic gunboats and British warships involving ramming became the tactic of choice during this conflict. At least 15 British frigates, five Icelandic patrol boats and one British supply ship were damaged by ramming between 1975 and 1976. In the end, Iceland achieved its overall ambition of expanding its exclusive fishery zone to 200 nautical miles (370 km) by June 1976.

== Operations ==
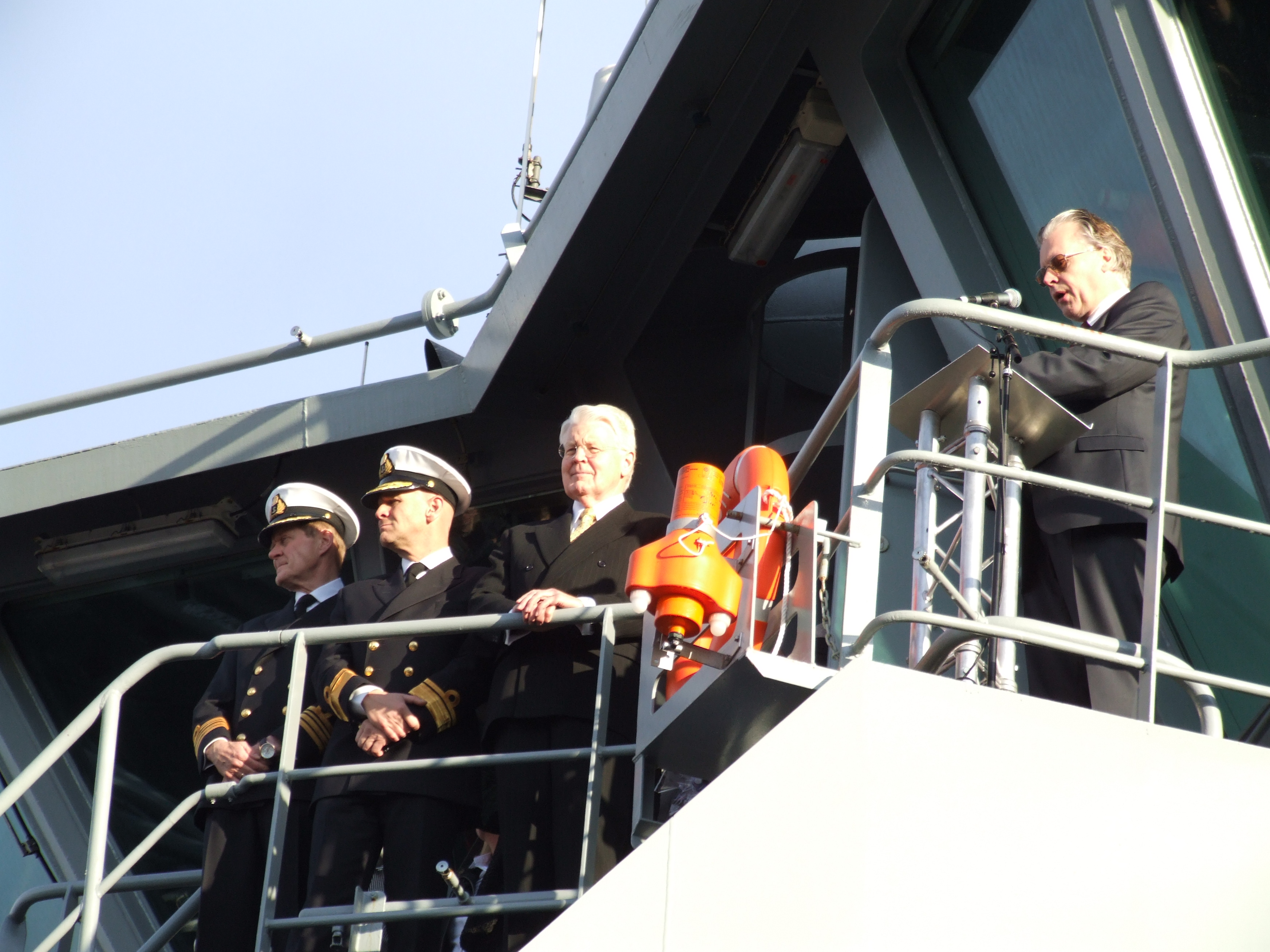
From left to right: Captain of Þór Cdr. s.g. Sigurður Steinar Ketilsson, Director of the Icelandic Coast Guard R.Adm. Georg Kr. Lárusson, former President of Iceland Ólafur Ragnar Grímsson, and former Minister of the Interior Ögmundur Jónasson (2011)

The Icelandic Coast Guard's (ICG) primary mission as stipulated in Section 1 of Act on Icelandic Coast Guard is conduct search and rescue, maritime safety and security surveillance, and law enforcement inside the 200-nautical-mile (370 km; 230 mi)-wide economic zone. The Coast Guard operates Joint Rescue and Coordination Centre (JRCC) Iceland which is responsible for search and rescue of vessels and aircraft in Iceland's search and rescue region (SRR) according to International Aeronautical and Maritime Search and Rescue (IAMSAR) Manual. Additionally the ICG is in the charge of defusing naval mines, most of which were laid during the Second World War, and monitoring fisheries in international waters outside of the Icelandic economic zone in order to blacklist any vessel partaking in unregulated fishing and thus bar them from receiving services from any member of the North East Atlantic Fisheries Commission in order to make unregulated fishing unprofitable. The Icelandic Coast Guard also occasionally operates within Greenlandic and Faeroese waters, following a bilateral agreement with Denmark regarding mutual aid in security, rescue and defence matters.

The Coast Guard accomplishes these tasks with the use of offshore patrol vessels (OPV), helicopters, surveillance aircraft, satellites and a network of land based surface scanning radar.

The Icelandic Coast Guard is also in charge of the Iceland Air Defence System, which operates four ground-based AN-FPS(V)5 air surveillance radars and a control and command centre.

In the 1990s the Coast Guard started hosting exercises such as "Northern Challenge" which had military units from Norway, Denmark, Sweden and the United Kingdom, among others, participating along with the Icelandic Coast Guard. The Coast Guard has also taken part in peacekeeping operations on behalf of the Icelandic Crisis Response Unit, although while usually using their own rank insignia, uniforms and weapons.

The fleet also takes part in Frontex operations, and in that role ICGV Týr played a major part in the rescue of over 300 Syrian refugees in the eastern Mediterranean Sea in January 2015.

== Fleet ==
As of 2022, the Icelandic Coast Guard fleet consists of two OPVs, one coastal hydrographic and patrol vessel and an independent fast rigid-hulled inflatable boat (RHIB), as well as numerous smaller boats assigned to the larger units. In 2011 the Coast Guard received ICGV Þór, built by the Asmar shipyard in Talcahuano, Chile.

The coastguard operates a 73-ton patrol and hydrographic survey vessel, named Baldur, built by Vélsmiðja Seyðisfjarðar shipyard in 1991. This vessel has no mounted weaponry, but it has nonetheless been used for port and coastal security and fishery inspection.

The newest vessel of the fleet, ICGV Freyja, was bought in September 2021 to replace the 46-year old ICGV Týr. It arrived for retrofit at Damen Shiprepair Rotterdam in Schiedam on 11 October and was formally delivered to the Coast Guard on 1 November 2021. She departed for Siglufjordur on 2 November.

== Aeronautical division ==
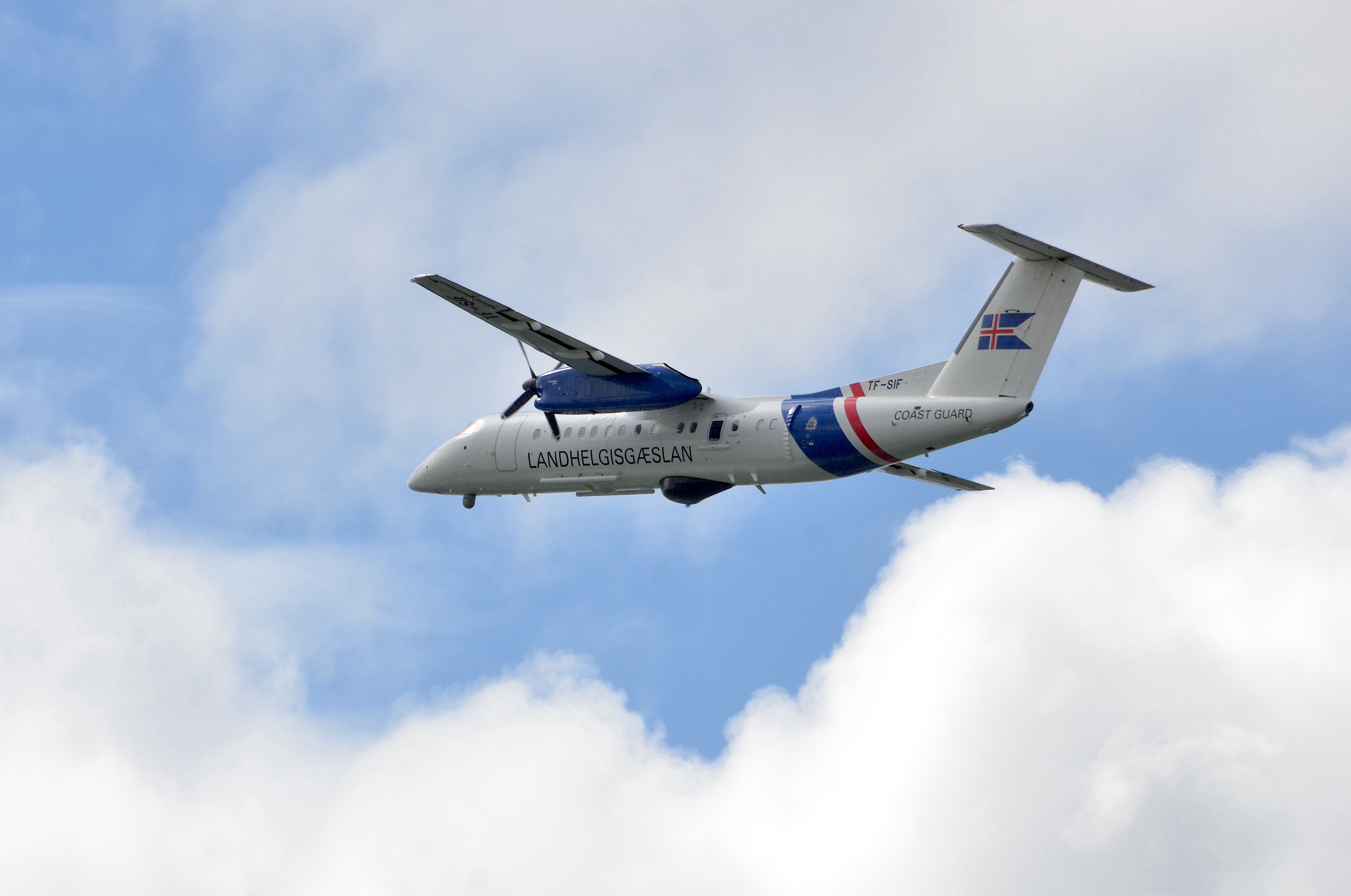
Icelandic Coast Guard Dash 8-300 MSA

The Icelandic Coast Guard operates all emergency maritime rescue, land-based search and rescue and emergency aerial medivac services in Iceland. Most of its mission time is dedicated to these purposes but also conducts maritime surveillance of fishing grounds and geological surveys (e.g. during volcanic eruptions) using its fleet of helicopters and aircraft. Its fixed-wing aircraft have also been deployed in illegal migration flow surveillance in the Mediterranean, on behalf of Frontex.

=== History ===
After World War II, the Coast Guard occasionally leased civilian aircraft for short term monitoring of shipping and fishing in the territorial waters, first in 1948 when a Grumman Goose was leased from Loftleiðir. On 10 December 1955, the Coast Guard acquired its first aircraft when a Consolidated PBY-6A Catalina flying boat was acquired from the Civil Aviation Administration. It was originally from the Iceland Defense Force but was damaged near Langanes in 1954. It was named Rán and registered as TF-RAN.

==== Helicopters ====
In 1972, the ICG, along with the Icelandic Association for Search and Rescue, bought its first specialized search and rescue helicopter, a Sikorsky S-62 that was named Gná, from the United States Coast Guard. Three years later, Gná crashed in Skálafell, with no injuries, after a shaft in the tail propeller broke.

It took five years for another SAR helicopter to arrive but in 1980, the Coast Guard bought a new Sikorsky S-76 which was given the name Rán. The helicopter performed admirably, including in March 1983, when Rán, along with a French Aérospatiale SA 330 Puma, one of two temporarily deployed in the country, rescued 11 people from Hafrún ÍS-400 after it ran aground at Stigahlíð in the Westfjords. However, in November 1983, Rán crashed in Jökulfirðir in the Westfjords of Iceland during a training mission, killing its four man crew, in what remains the deadliest accident in the ICG history. The loss of Rán and some of the Coast Guard's most experienced flight members nearly caused the shutdown of its helicopter program. After some deliberation, the decision was made in 1984 to continue the program and buy a new Aérospatiale SA 365N Dauphin II and rent another until the new one would arrive.

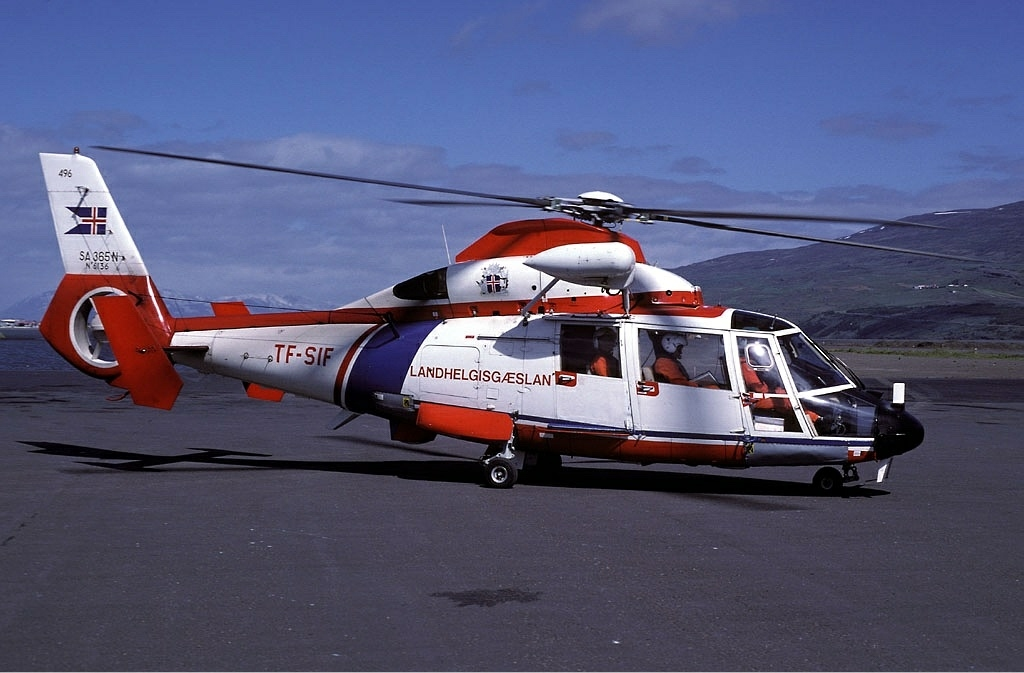
Icelandic Coast Guard Aerospatiale SA-365SP Dauphin in 1989.

In 1985, the new Sif arrived and with it, several changes were made to the helicopter program, including to training, expanding crew rosters, addition of helicopter doctors and shift plans to expand its availability. Sif went on to become one of the ICG most successful aircraft to date. During its 22-year career it took part in several high-profile rescue operations around Iceland and is credited to have been involved in the rescue of around 250 lives.

In 1995, the ICG received a second specialised SAR helicopter when it bought an Aérospatiale AS-332L1 Super Puma which was given the name Líf. The new helicopter continued on the success of Sif and gained national fame when it rescued 39 sailors in three separate incidents during a six-day period in March 1997.

As a response to the withdrawal of the Iceland Defense Force in 2006, the Coast Guard expanded its helicopters to four in 2007. That number was later reduced to three.

=== Retired aircraft ===
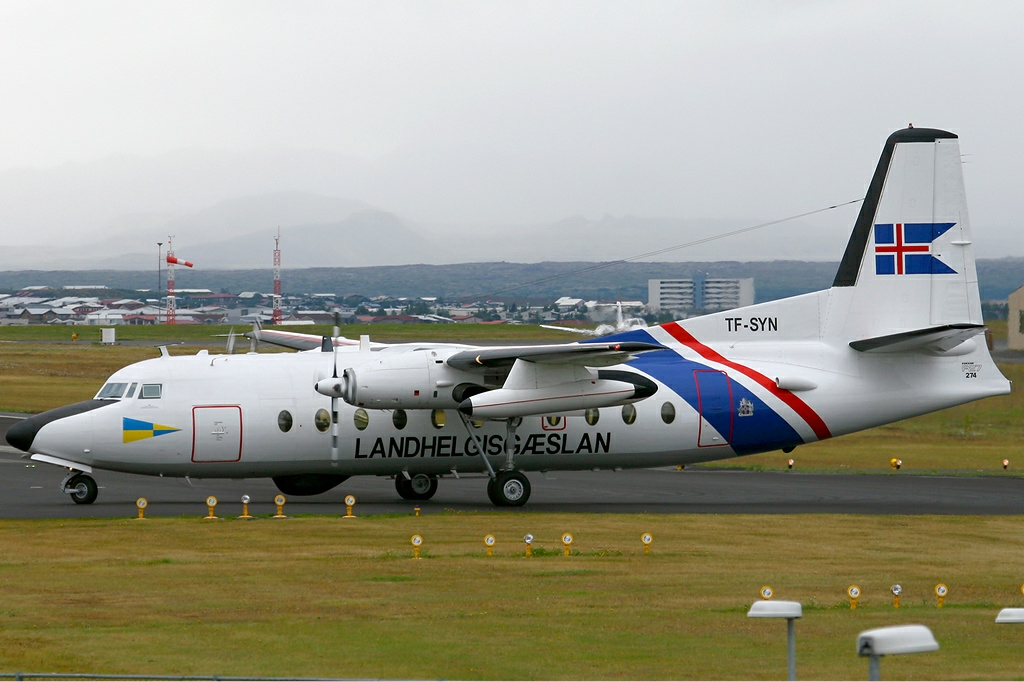
Icelandic Coast Guard F27-Friendship during its last years of service in 2007.

Previous notable aircraft operated consisted of the Consolidated PBY Catalina, Douglas C-54, Fokker F27, Bell 47J/G, MD 500C, Sikorsky S-62, Sikorsky S-76, Eurocopter AS365, Eurocopter AS350. Three former aircraft of the Icelandic Coast Guard can be viewed and boarded at the Icelandic Aviation Museum in Akureyri, the helicopters TF-SIF and TF-LÍF, and the Fokker F-27 TF-SYN.

=== Today ===
As of 2022, it operates three Airbus Helicopters H225 helicopters named Gná, Gró and Eir.

The Coast Guard also operates a single Bombardier DHC-8-Q314, registered as TF-SIF, modified for maritime surveillance and reconnaissance. This plane has been extensively modified by FIELD to carry a modern Mission Management System and suite of surveillance sensors, air operable door and communications/navigation equipment. It is occasionally also used for surveillance of volcanic eruptions, such as the 2010 eruptions of Eyjafjallajökull.

== Equipment ==
All major ships and aircraft of the Icelandic Coast Guard are named after beings from Norse mythology.

=== Vessels ===
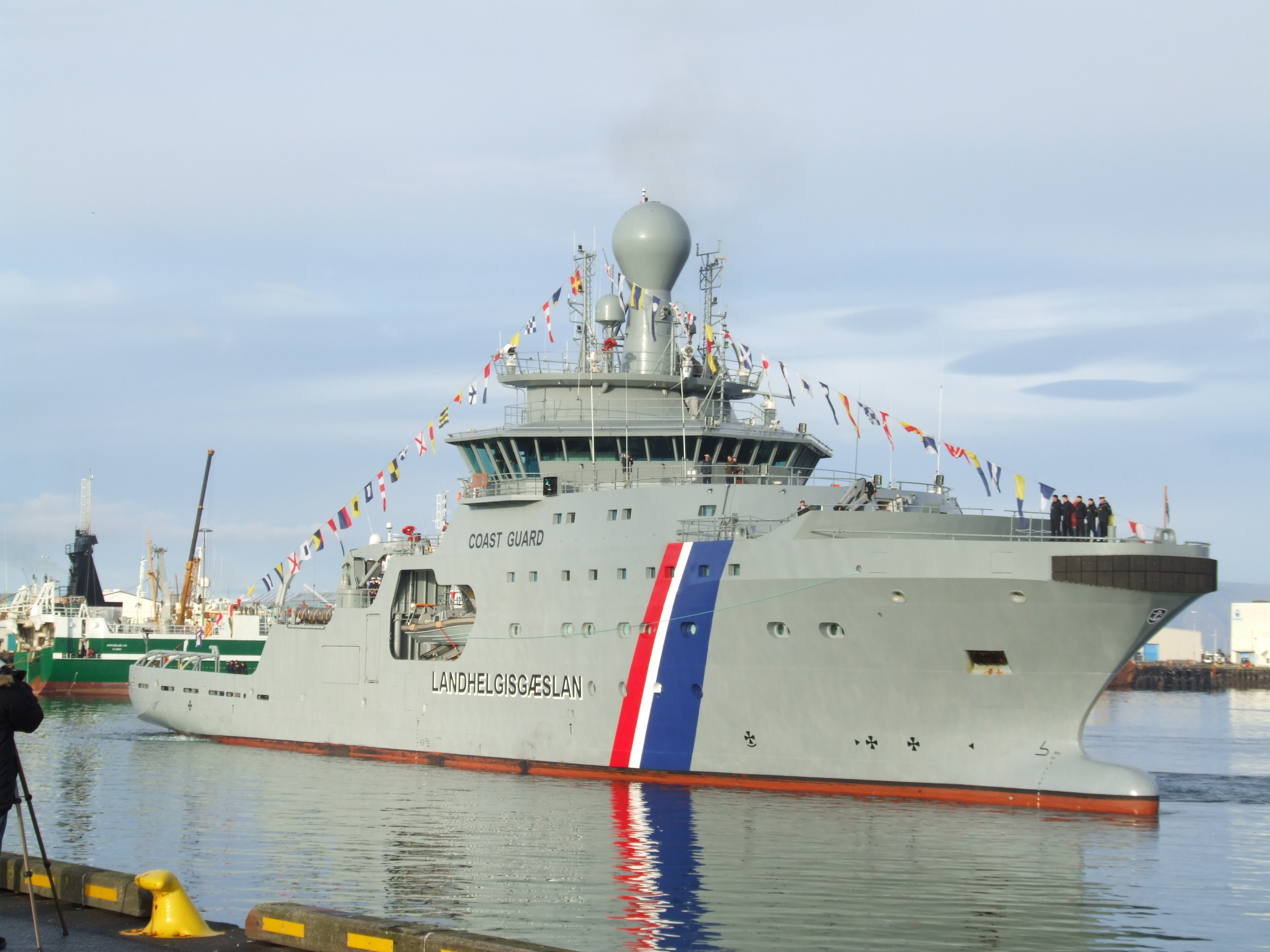
The Chilean built ICGV Þór patrol boat

Vessel	Origin	Type	Introduced	Notes
ICGV Freyja	South Korea	Patrol vessel	2021	Named after the goddess Freyja
ICGV Þór (IV)	Chile	Patrol vessel	2009	Named after the god Thor
ICGV Baldur (III)	Iceland	Patrol vessel	1991	Named after the god Baldr, also performs hydrographic survey duties
ICGV Óðinn (IV)	Iceland	Special operations	2011	Named after the god Óðinn

=== Decommissioned vessels ===
Name	Type	From	To	Notes
ICGV Þór (I)	Armed trawler	1926	1929	The first ship owned by the Icelandic Coast Guard. Originally a trawler and later a Danish research vessel named Thor, it was bought by Björgunarfélag Vestmannaeyja in 1920 to be used as a rescue ship. In 1926, the Icelandic government bought the ship for the Coast Guard. It was stranded in Húnaflói in 1929.
ICGV Óðinn (I)	Patrol vessel	1926	1936	Arrived in 1926 and served until it was sold to Sweden in 1936.
ICGV Ægir (I)	Patrol vessel	1929	1968	Arrived new in July 1929. Used for coastal patrol, rescue and research. Sold for scrap in 1968.
ICGV Þór (II)	Patrol vessel	1930	1939	Built in Stettin, Germany, in 1922 as Senator Schäfer. Arrived in Iceland in 1930 and served with the Coast Guard until 1939. Used as a transport ship until sold to England in 1946. Stranded in Scotland in 1950.
ICGV Gautur	Patrol vessel	1938	1964	Built in 1938 in Akureyri. Originally named Óðinn (II) but renamed when a new Óðinn (III) arrived, Gautur is one of Óðinn's pseudonyms. Put up for sale in 1963 and sold a year later.
ICGV Baldur (I)	Fast patrol boat	1945	1946	A fast patrol boat originally built for the Turkish Navy in 1943 but expropriated by the United Kingdom. Bought early in 1946 but used for less than a year and returned because of bad characteristics in rough seas.
ICGV Njörður	Fast patrol boat	1945	1946	Named after Njörðr the god of wind, fertile land along the seacoast, as well as seamanship, sailing and fishing. A fast patrol boat originally built for the Turkish Navy in 1943 but expropriated by the United Kingdom. Bought early in 1946 but used for less than a year and returned because of bad characteristics in rough seas.
ICGV Bragi	Fast patrol boat	1945	1946	Named after Bragi the god of poetry. A fast patrol boat originally built for the Turkish Navy in 1943 but expropriated by the United Kingdom. Bought early in 1946 but used for less than a year and returned because of bad characteristics in rough seas.
ICGV Sæbjörg	Patrol and rescue ship			Built in 1947 to 1948. Owned by the National Life-saving Association of Iceland but operated by the ICG. Decommissioned in the mid 1960s.
ICGV María Júlía	Patrol, research and rescue vessel	1950	1969	Named after one of those who financed her construction. Joint ownership by the ICG and the National Life-saving Association of Iceland. Operated by the ICG. Decommissioned in the late 1960s and sold in 1969.
ICGV Þór (III)	Offshore patrol vessel	1951	1982	Built in 1951 for the Coast Guard. The third coast guard ship to bear the name, she was the flagship of the fleet and served in all three Cod Wars conflicts between Iceland and the United Kingdom. Sold in 1982.
ICGV Albert	Patrol and rescue vessel	1956	1978	Built in 1956 and jointly owned by the ICG and the National Life-saving Association of Iceland, now ICE-SAR. Operated by the ICG. Decommissioned and sold in 1978.
ICGV Óðinn (III)	Offshore patrol vessel	1960	2006	An offshore Patrol Vessel named after Óðinn the all-seeing father of the gods. Decommissioned in 2006 and turned into a museum ship.
ICGV Ægir (II)	Ægir class	1968	2020	Danish-built Ægir-class offshore patrol vessel named after Ægir, the king of the sea. It was the flagship of the ICG during the last two Cod Wars. It was decommissioned in 2020 and put up for sale.
ICGV Árvakur	Lighthouse tender and patrol ship	1969		A lighthouse tender and patrol ship built in Holland in 1962 for the Department of Lighthouses and arrived in 1963. Transferred to the Coast Guard in 1969. Was put for sale in 1988.
ICGV Týr	Armed whaler	1972	1973	Armed whaler (Hvalur 9) borrowed during the second Cod War It was nicknamed Hval-Týr by the Icelanders and Moby Dick by the British.
ICGV Týr (II)	Ægir class	1974	2021	Danish-built Ægir-class offshore patrol vessel named after Týr, the god of combat and heroism. It was decommissioned in 2021 and put up for sale.
ICGV Baldur (II)	Armed trawler	1975	1977	Named after the god Baldr, son of Óðinn. An armed trawler which served in the third Cod Wars conflict between Iceland and the United Kingdom. Due to its sharp stern, Baldur could inflict heavy damage on British ships colliding with its stern section and knocked out three frigates during the conflict.
ICGV Ver	Armed trawler	1976	1976	Built in 1974 in Poland for Krossvík hf. in Akranes. Operated by the ICG in the last Cod War in 1975–1976.

In addition the Coast Guard has rented or borrowed a number of civilian vessels and aircraft for shorter periods, which are not listed.

=== Aircraft ===
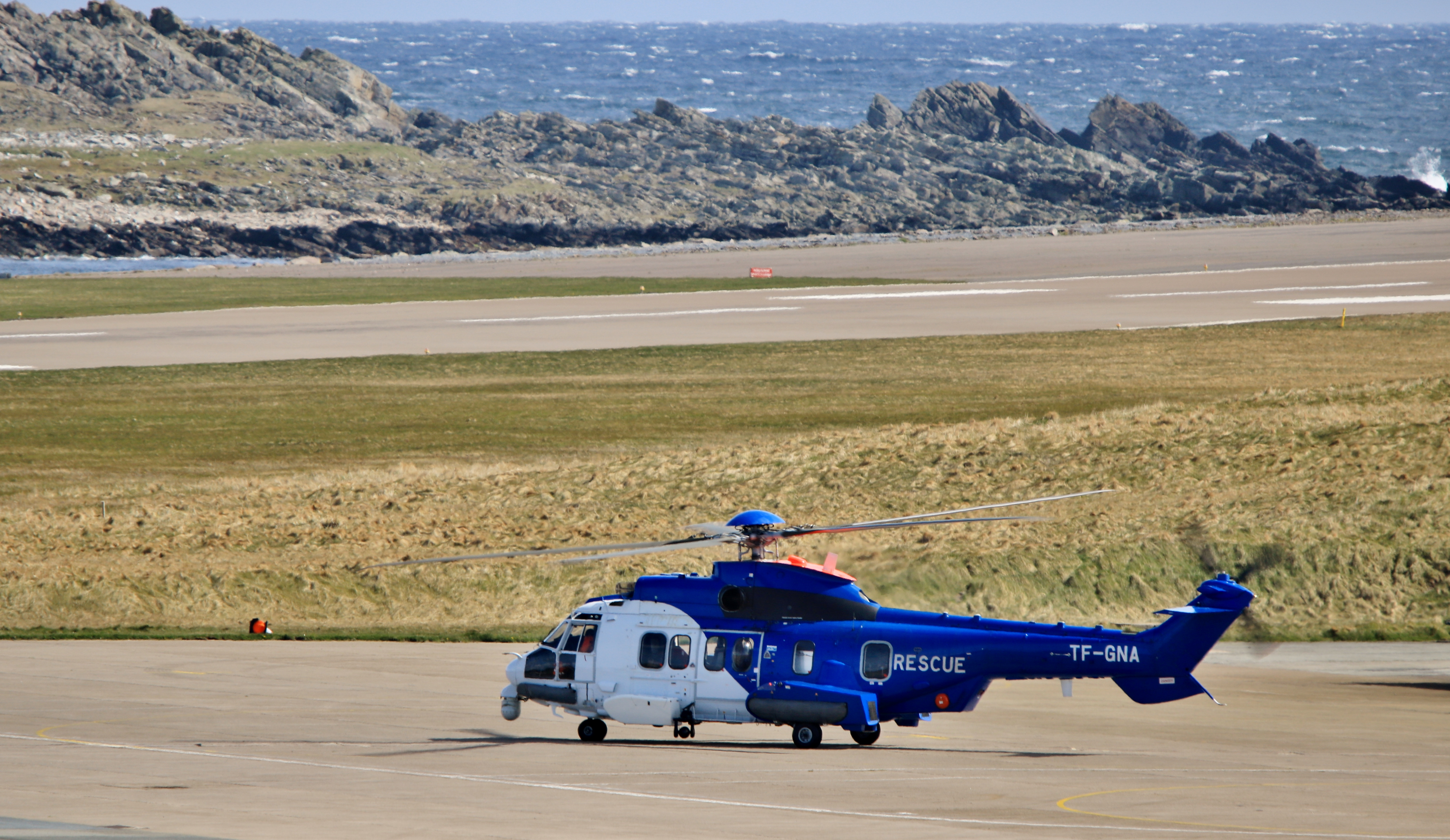
An Airbus H225 of the Icelandic Coast Guard.

Aircraft	Origin	Type	Variant	In service	Introduced	Notes
Maritime patrol
Bombardier DHC-8-Q314	Canada	Maritime patrol / SAR	-300 MSA	1	2009	TF-SIF
Helicopters
Airbus H225	France	SAR / Utility		3	2019	TF-EIR; TF-GRO; TF-GNA

== Radars ==
Iceland Air Defense System radar stations
Radar station with AN/FPS-117(V)5
Control and Reporting Centre

The Iceland Air Defense System monitors Iceland's airspace. Air Defense is provided by fighter jets from NATO allies, which rotate units for the Icelandic Air Policing mission to Keflavik Airport. The Iceland Air Defense System's Control and Reporting Centre is at the ICG centre at Keflavik Airport and reports to NATO's Integrated Air Defense System CAOC Uedem in Germany.

- Iceland Air Defense System, at Keflavik Airport
  - Control and Reporting Centre, at Keflavik Airport
  - H1 Radar Station, at Miðnesheiði, with AN/FPS-117(V)5
  - H2 Radar Station, on Langanes, with AN/FPS-117(V)5
  - H3 Radar Station, at Stokksnes, with AN/FPS-117(V)5
  - H4 Radar Station, on Bolafjall, with AN/FPS-117(V)5

== Bases ==
The Icelandic coast guard has 2 naval bases located at Reykjavik harbor and one at Siglufjörður on top of that Iceland has 2 air bases at Reykjavík Airport that has rescue helicopters and one rescue plane and a NATO air base at Keflavík International Airport where Icelandic Air Policing is based.

== Weaponry ==
The Icelandic Coast Guard possesses over 200 firearms, with more than half of them in storage. In 2014, the Coast Guard received 250 Heckler & Koch MP5 from the Norwegian Armed Forces. The acquisition of the weapons caused an uproar in Iceland due to several facts, including that the mostly unarmed Icelandic Police was to receive 150 of them and conflicting statements from Icelandic and Norwegian officials on whether they were a gift or bought. In June 2015, the weapons were returned to Norway.

=== Currently in use ===
Model	Type	Origin	Quantity	Details	References
Glock 17	Semi-automatic pistol	Austria	20	Models 1990, 2006 and 2012. Bought from a dealership in Reykjavík.	
H&K MP5A2N	Submachine gun	West Germany	50	Model 1990. Gift from Norway in 2011.	
AR-15	Semi-automatic rifle	United States	6	Model 2017. Bought the same year and first used during a peace keeping mission.	
Rheinmetall MG 3	General-purpose machine gun	West Germany	10	Model 1990. Gifted by Norway in 2013 along with 50 sets of body armour.	
Bofors 40 mm L/70	Autocannon	Sweden	4	Purchased from Norway and refurbished.	
Bofors 40 mm L/60	Autocannon	Sweden	4	Model 1936. Gift from Denmark.	

=== Currently in storage ===
Model	Type	Origin	Quantity	Details	References
S&W .38 Police Special	Revolver	United States	12	Model 1940. Marshall aid.	
Remington Model 870	Pump action shotgun	United States	4	Model 2000. Bought from a dealership in Reykjavík.	
M1 carbine	Carbine	United States	30	Model 1940. Lent to the Reykjavík Police in 1986.	
M2 carbine	Carbine	United States	20	Model 1940. Lent to the Reykjavík Police in 1986.	
SMLE Lee-Enfield	Bolt-action rifle	British Empire	10	Model 1910. Unknown origin.	
H&K G3	Battle rifle	West Germany	20	Model 1959. Gift from Denmark 2006.	
Steyr SSG 69	Sniper rifle	Austria	8	Model 1989. Bought from a dealership in Reykjavík.	
Browning M2	Heavy machine gun	United States	3	Model 1939. Came with a seaplane which the ICG had in operation.	
Cannon 37 mm	Cannon	Denmark	3	Model 1898. Gift from Denmark.	
Cannon 47 mm	Cannon	Denmark	3	Model 1909. Gift from Denmark.	
Cannon 57 mm	Cannon	Denmark	5	Model 1892. Gift from Denmark.	
QF 3-pounder Hotchkiss	Cannon	France	1	Model 1912. At a museum in Ísafjörður.	

== Ranks ==
=== Officers ===
NATO code	OF-10	OF-9	OF-8	OF-7	OF-6	OF-5	OF-4	OF-3	OF-2	OF-1
Icelandic Coast Guard
Icelandic Coast Guard				Forstjóri Landhelgisgæslunnar	Framkv.stjóri aðgerðasviðs	Framkv.stjóri siglingasviðs/ Framkv.stjóri varnarmálasviðs	Flugrekstrarstjóri/ Flaggskipherra/ Yfirflugstjóri/ Tæknistjóri	Skipherrar/ Flugstjórar/ Deildarstjórar	Næstráðandi/ Yfirstýrimaður/ Flugmaður/ Yfirvélstjóri	Yfirmaður eftir 6 ár/ Stýrimaður/ Flugmaður/ Vélstjóri	Yfirmaður eftir 2 ár/ Stýrimaður/ Flugmaður/ Vélstjóri	Byrjandi í yfirmannastöðu

=== Enlisted ===
NATO code	OR-9	OR-8	OR-7	OR-6	OR-5	OR-4	OR-3	OR-2		OR-1
Icelandic Coast Guard
Icelandic Coast Guard	Millistjórnandi/sérfræðingur MS-3		Millistjórnandi/sérfræðingur MS-2		Millistjórnandi/sérfræðingur MS-1		Undirmaður AS-4	Undirmaður AS-3	Undirmaður AS-2	Undirmaður/Byrjandi AS-1

== See also ==
- Military of Iceland
- Iceland Defense Force (United States Armed Forces in Iceland)
