= Georg Kr. Lárusson =

Director General of the Icelandic Coast Guard

Director General Georg Kr. Lárusson
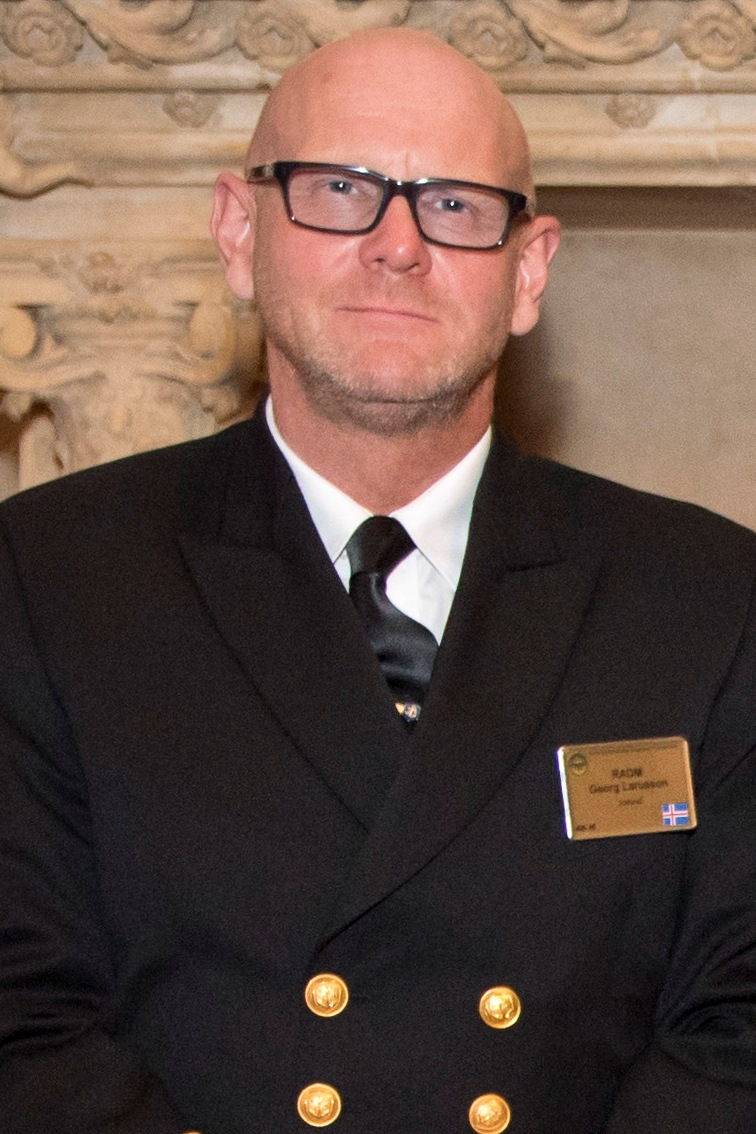
- Director General Georg Kr. Lárusson
- Born: 21 March 1959 (age 67); Reykjavík, Iceland
- Military career
- Allegiance: Iceland
- Branch: Icelandic Coast Guard
- Service years: 2005–present
- Rank: Director General

Georg Kristinn Lárusson (Icelandic pronunciation: [ˈcɛːɔrk ˈkʰrɪstɪn ˈlauːrʏsɔn]; born 21 March 1959) is the Director General of the Icelandic Coast Guard and former director of the Icelandic Directorate of Immigration, a position he held from 1999 to 2005. He graduated from the University of Iceland with a law degree in 1985 and a postgraduate degree from the Faculty of Law at the University of Copenhagen. He was a judge's representative at the Reykjavík District Court in 1985-89 and was the district magistrate in Dalasýsla, Strandasýsla and Kópavogur in the period 1989–92. He served as district magistrate of Vestmannaeyjar from 1992 to 1998. Georg was appointed deputy chief of police in Reykjavík from 1998 to 1999.

== Honours ==
=== National Honours ===
- Iceland:
  - Knight of the Order of the Falcon (1 January 2019).

=== Foreign Honours ===
- France:
  - Officer of the Ordre du Mérite Maritime (11 October 2022).
- Poland:
  - Knight of the Order of Merit of the Republic of Poland (22 May 2025).
