= Bolafjall Radar Station =

Icelandic General Surveillance Radar station

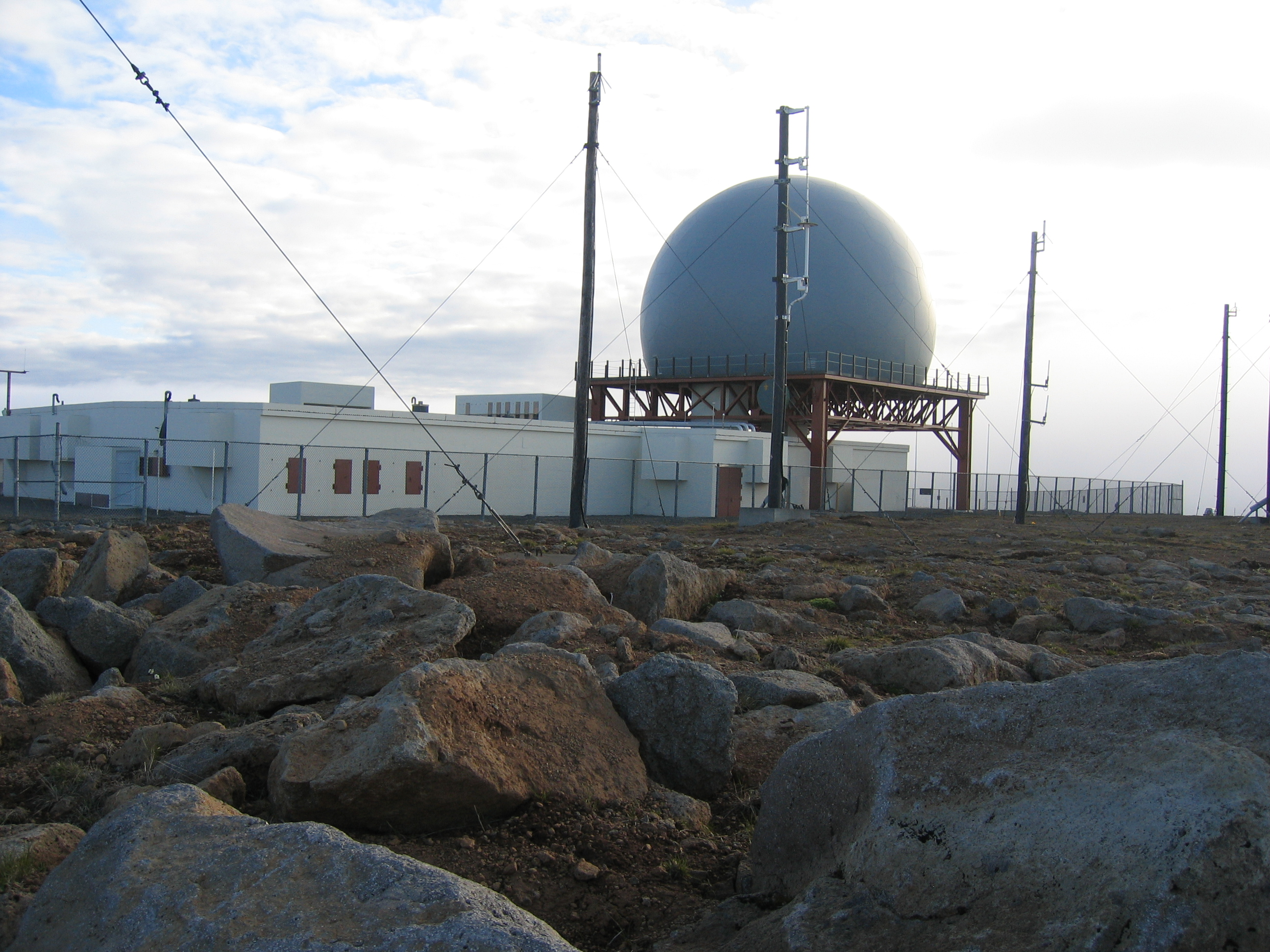
- Bolafjall Radar Station

Site information
- Type: Radar Station
- Owner: NATO
- Operator: Iceland Air Defence System
- Condition: Operational

Location
- Location of Bolafjall Radar Station
- Coordinates: 66°10′41″N 023°19′41″W

Site history
- Built: 1985–1992
- In use: 1992–present

Bolafjall Radar Station (NATO ID: H-4) is an Icelandic General Surveillance Radar station and part of the Iceland Air Defence System. It is located atop on Bolafjall near the town of Bolungarvik. It is operated by the Icelandic Coast Guard under the joint direction of NATO as part of the Icelandic Air Policing.

== History ==
H-4 had previously established as Straumnes Air Station in 1953-1956, 30 km (18 mi) north on the sparsely inhabited Hornstrandir peninsula. It was abandoned due to cost in 1960. When the Iceland Air Defence System was being established, a location closer to transport links and population centres was chosen, and therefore H-4 was established at Bolafjall, near Bolugnarvík.

The station was established as a North Atlantic Treaty Organization (NATO) radar station in January 1992, with its construction cost paid by the NATO Infrastructure Fund. While the United States Air Force paid for its operational expenses, it was operated by the Radar Agency (Icelandic: Ratsjárstofnun) with civilian staff. The mission of the station was to intercept and shadow all Soviet aircraft in transit in and from the GIUK gap which passed through the detection range of its radars and relay to the NAS Keflavik Radar Operations Control Center (ROCC).

In 2006, the United States withdrew its military units from Iceland, leaving the radar station fully in Icelandic hands. In 2008, the Radar Agency was closed and its mission moved to the newly founded Icelandic Defence Agency (Varnarmálastofnun Íslands). Following the closure of the Icelandic Defence Agency, the operations where moved to the Icelandic Coast Guard.

== See also ==
- Icelandic Air Defence System
- Icelandic Coast Guard
- Straumnes Air Station
- List of USAF Aerospace Defense Command General Surveillance Radar Stations

== Notes ==
- Winkler, David F. (1997), Searching the skies: the legacy of the United States Cold War defense radar program. Prepared for United States Air Force Headquarters Air Combat Command.
