= Faroese coast guard =

Faroese Fisheries Inspection Service Vørn
- Logo

- Faroese maritime ensign

Agency overview
- Formed: 1978; 48 years ago (as the Faroese Coastguard Service); 2012; 14 years ago (as the Faroese Fisheries, Surveillance and Salvage Agency or Faroese Fisheries Inspection)

Jurisdictional structure
- Operations jurisdiction: Faroe Islands
- Legal jurisdiction: Faroe Islands exclusive economic zone (EEZ)
- Governing body: Ministry of Fisheries

Operational structure
- Headquarters: Tórshavn
- Agency executive: Jóhan Simonsen, Department director

Facilities
- Vessels: 7 patrol and rescue boats
- Rotary wings: 2 helicopters (on charter)

Website
- Official website (in Faroese)

The Faroese coast guard (Faroese: Vørn; lit. 'Defense'), alternatively known as the Faroese Fisheries Inspection and Rescue Service, is the combined coast guard and fishery enforcement agency of the Faroe Islands. The organization has also been translated as the Faroese Fisheries, Surveillance and Salvage Agency. Being an autonomous territory, militarized defense of the Faroes is the responsibility of the Danish Realm. As such, the Faroese coast guard is not a military force, but rather a civilian organization.

Headquartered in Tórshavn and under the Ministry of Fisheries, the organization is (alternatively) sometimes shortened to simply the Faroese Fisheries Inspection, with slight variations in grammar and phrasing.

Primary missions besides the aforementioned include maritime surveillance and search and rescue, which the agency executes with a fleet of patrol boats, RHIBs, and 2 helicopters, as of 2026. The two helicopters, both AW139s, are chartered from Atlantic Airways, the flag carrier of the Faroe Islands.

According to Statistics Faroe Islands, the coast guard performed 164 rescue operations at sea in 2024.

== History ==
The Home Rule Act of 1948 authorized the Faroese government to establish their own local government organizations, and in 1978 the first “Faroese Coastguard Service” was created, under the jurisdiction of the Ministry of Fisheries. In 2002, the Marine Rescue Coordination Centre (MRCC) in Tórshavn was founded, and in 2012 it merged with the Fisheries Inspection Service to form Vørn, the modern Faroese coast guard. Both agencies would still carry out essentially the same functions as before, but with a joint government command, rather than being separate entities.

The Tjalrið was the first of the coast guard ships, launched in 1976. Due to the demilitarization policy (as outlined in the Home Rule Act), it was unarmed. As of 2024, the Tjalrið was still in active service; the fleet's second largest ship, behind the Brimil.

In 1979, the ship M/V Tórsvík, a 39 meter (127 foot) patrol boat, was built in Denmark. It served in the fleet of the Faroese Coastguard Service before eventually being decommissioned and privately sold on September 15, 2021.

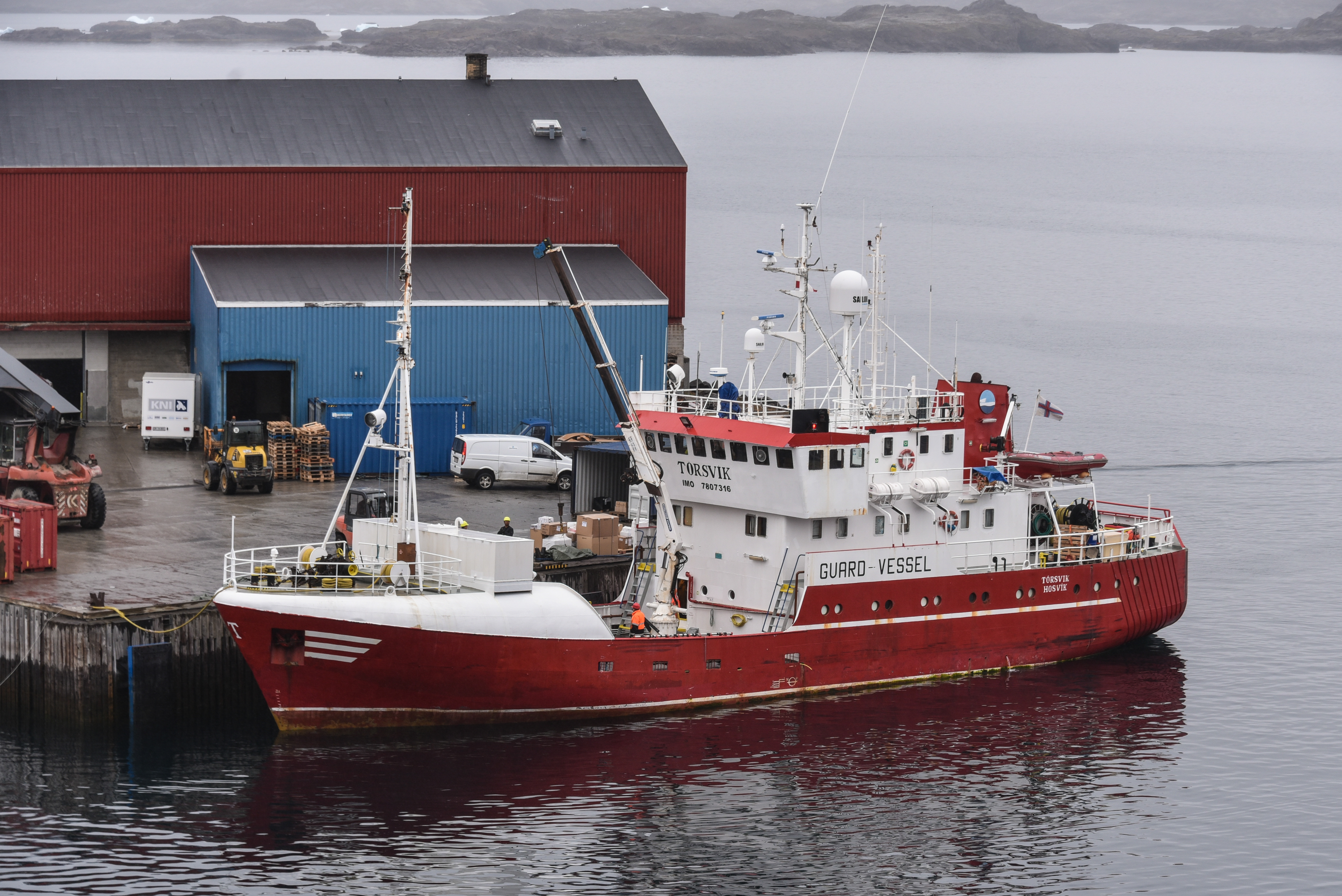
M/V Tórsvík, built 1979, formerly of the Faroese coast guard

== Structure ==
The Vørn organization consists of three branches: The Fisheries Inspection, the Maritime Rescue Coordination Centre (MRCC), and the Meteorological Office.

=== Maritime Rescue Coordination Centre ===
All search and rescue (SAR) in the Faroe Islands is coordinated through the Maritime (or Marine) Rescue Coordination Centre (MRCC) in Tórshavn, which acts as a joint command and control center, and is active 24/7. The MRCC has been a branch of the Vørn since 2012.

Organizational chart

== Operations ==
=== Operations of the flagship Brimil ===
In 2022, the Faroese coast guard hosted the Icelandic Coast Guard and Danish Navy for a training exercise. During the exercise, sailors performed a smoke drill (simulating a distress beacon), and subsequent tow training. The Faroese flagship Brimil was present, alongside the Icelandic ship ICGV Þór and Danish ship HDMS Vædderen.

On February 6, 2024, the Brimil performed a sea rescue. In the early morning, a 46-meter (150 foot) longliner, the Kambur, hit high seas and sent out a distress call; the Brimil and a helicopter were scrambled to assist. Thirteen people were rescued from the ship, which sank 90 minutes thereafter. Two fishermen remained missing, yet after four days of searching, authorities from the MRCC concluded them to be deceased, and called off the searching vessels.

In May 2024, the coast guard participated in NATO training exercise "Dynamic Mongoose '24", in Reykjavík, Iceland. The Brimil engaged in shallow-water maneuver drills off the Faroese coast alongside vessels from Canada, Denmark, Germany, Norway, Sweden, the United Kingdom, United States, Spain, and the Netherlands.

In October 2024, the crew of the Brimil performed scuba training with their onboard facilities and suits.

=== Other operations ===
In 2024, the American submarine USS Albany visited the Faroe Islands and met with representatives of the coast guard.

In September 2025, representatives from the Icelandic Directorate of Fisheries travelled to the Faroes to coordinate with their counterparts in the Vørn, and meetings were held with regards to strengthening relations.

In January 2026, the coast guard was responsible for monitoring Russian commercial excursions into Faroese waters, specifically against the government blacklisted companies Norebo and Murman Seafood. Under department director Jóhan Simonsen, the vessels of the coast guard were authorized to conduct sovereignty patrols (and enforce international maritime law) against illegal Russian fishing vessels. The two countries had a bilateral agreement, yet these protective measures existed to enforce overfishing limits. The two companies specifically were barred from entry to Faroese ports effective January 1st, 2026.

== Vehicles ==
=== Vessels ===
As of January 2024, the Faroese coastal patrol fleet consisted of the following vessels:

Vessel	Type	Length	Maximum speed	Crew	Capacity	Notes
Brimil	Patrol vessel	~63m (206 ft.)	17 knots (19.5 mph)	12 persons	30 persons	Flagship of the Faroese fleet
Tjalrið	Patrol vessel	~44m (144 ft.)	15 knots (17 mph)	11	15	Second medium-sized patrol vessel
Liv	Patrol vessel	~14m (45 ft.)	22 knots (25 mph)	4	4	Rescue boat
Ziska	Patrol vessel	~19m (62 ft.)	25 knots (28 mph)			Rescue boat
Sverri	Patrol vessel	~14m (45 ft.)	31 knots (35 mph)	4	4	Rescue boat
Vón	Patrol vessel	~15m (49 ft.)	30 knots (34 mph)	2-5	4-5 (main cabin), 10 (forward cabin)	Rescue boat
East	Patrol vessel					Rescue boat

=== Aircraft ===
The primary air assets of the coast guard are two Leonardo AW139s, which are chartered from Atlantic Airways. The AW139s replaced two aging Bell 412s in 2015 and 2016, which had previously been in service with the organization. Atlantic Airways provides trained pilots, and maintains a designated SAR Team within their Helicopter Division, to access remote islands and perform rescues in challenging weather environments. The crews train weekly for both land and sea operations. As of 2026, the two helicopters were named Sámal and Ruth.

== Ranks ==
Shoulder epaulet of a Faroese maritime officer

=== Maritime ranks ===
All civilian crews registered in the Faroe Islands, (including those of the Faroese coast guard, a civilian organization), are to have the following licensed seafaring positions onboard:

- Captain (Faroese: Skipari)
- Master (Stýrimaður)
- Engineer (Maskinyvirmenn)
- Seafarer or Sailor (Sjófólk)

=== Aviation ranks ===
When tasked with search and rescue missions, commercial pilots and crew (on the imbedded SAR Team) have the following duty positions:

- Captain
- First Officer
- Hoist Operator
- Rescue Swimmer

The rank insignia for flight crew resembles the standard maritime equivalents; it consists of horizontal gold stripes on a navy blue fabric epaulette.

== See also ==
- HM Coastguard
- Royal Danish Navy
- Joint Arctic Command
- Island Command Faroes
- Law enforcement in the Faroe Islands
- Transportation in the Faroe Islands
- Coast guard
- Arctic policy of the Faroe Islands
