= Langanes Air Station =

Disused military base in Iceland

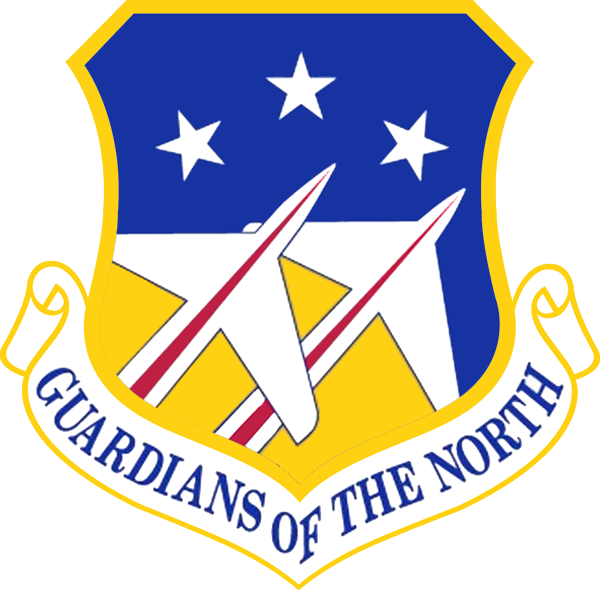
Langanes Air Station
- Part of Air Forces Iceland

Site information
- Type: Radar Station
- Owner: Icelandic Coast Guard

Location
- Location of Langanes Air Station, Iceland
- Coordinates: 66°16′44″N 014°59′37″W (H-2); 66°08′39″N 015°05′18″W (H-2A)

Site history
- Built: 1952, 1992
- In use: 1952–1960, 1992–2006, 2006-present

Langanes Air Station (ADC/NATO ID: H-2) was a United States Air Force General Surveillance Radar station. It is located 265 miles (426 km) northeast of the closed Naval Air Station Keflavik, Iceland.

In 1992 a new station was constructed around 15 km south of the original Langanes station which is now known as H-2 (H-2A) Gunnólfsvíkurfjall under the Iceland Air Defence System operated by the Icelandic Coast Guard.

== History ==
Langanes Air Station (H-2) was established in 1951, shortly after the return of United States military forces to Iceland. The site was operated by the 667th Aircraft Control and Warning Squadron, and was equipped with AN/FPS-3 and AN/FPS-20 radars.

The Greenland, Iceland and United Kingdom air defense sector, better known as the GIUK gap, was routinely utilized by the Soviet Union's long-range heavy bombers and maritime reconnaissance platforms as a transit point towards the Atlantic Ocean. From bases located at Archangel and Murmansk, Soviet aircraft would stream down to the North Cape in Norway towards the Gap which was use as a doorway to the vast Atlantic. Most of the Soviet missions were destined to probe United States’ air defense along the North Atlantic and after 1960 in the Caribbean where Cuba, the USSR's most important satellite state outside continental Europe, was located. Such was the perceived threat from the Soviet incursions that it became a priority for NATO to demonstrate to that the strategic Giuk passage would be monitored at all times.

In January 1961, the H-2 search radar bubble was blown down during a storm. The site was closed as a radar base and the 667th AC&W Squadron was moved to Hofn Air Station (H-3), where it replaced the 933d Aircraft Control and Warning Squadron. (note: the original site was used for several years as a communications site and for submarine detection)

The original H-2 site today is abandoned, long since left to the elements. Some foundations remain however the location is desolate and windswept.

=== New H-2 (H-2A) ===
In 1992, Langanes Air Station was re-opened at a new site (H-2A) at Gunnólfvikursfjall, located 15km to the southwest on a cliff along the coast, by the Icelandic Radar Agency. The 667th Air Control Squadron assisted with operation of the AN/FPS-117v5 radar from the site until 28 June 2006 when the U.S. military left the facility. It has since remained a part of the Icelandic Air Defence System, operated by the Icelandic Coast Guard, as of 2025.

== See also ==
- Iceland Air Defence System
- Icelandic Coast Guard
- United States general surveillance radar stations
