= Mjørkadalur =

- Detention (imprisonment), earlier a radar station
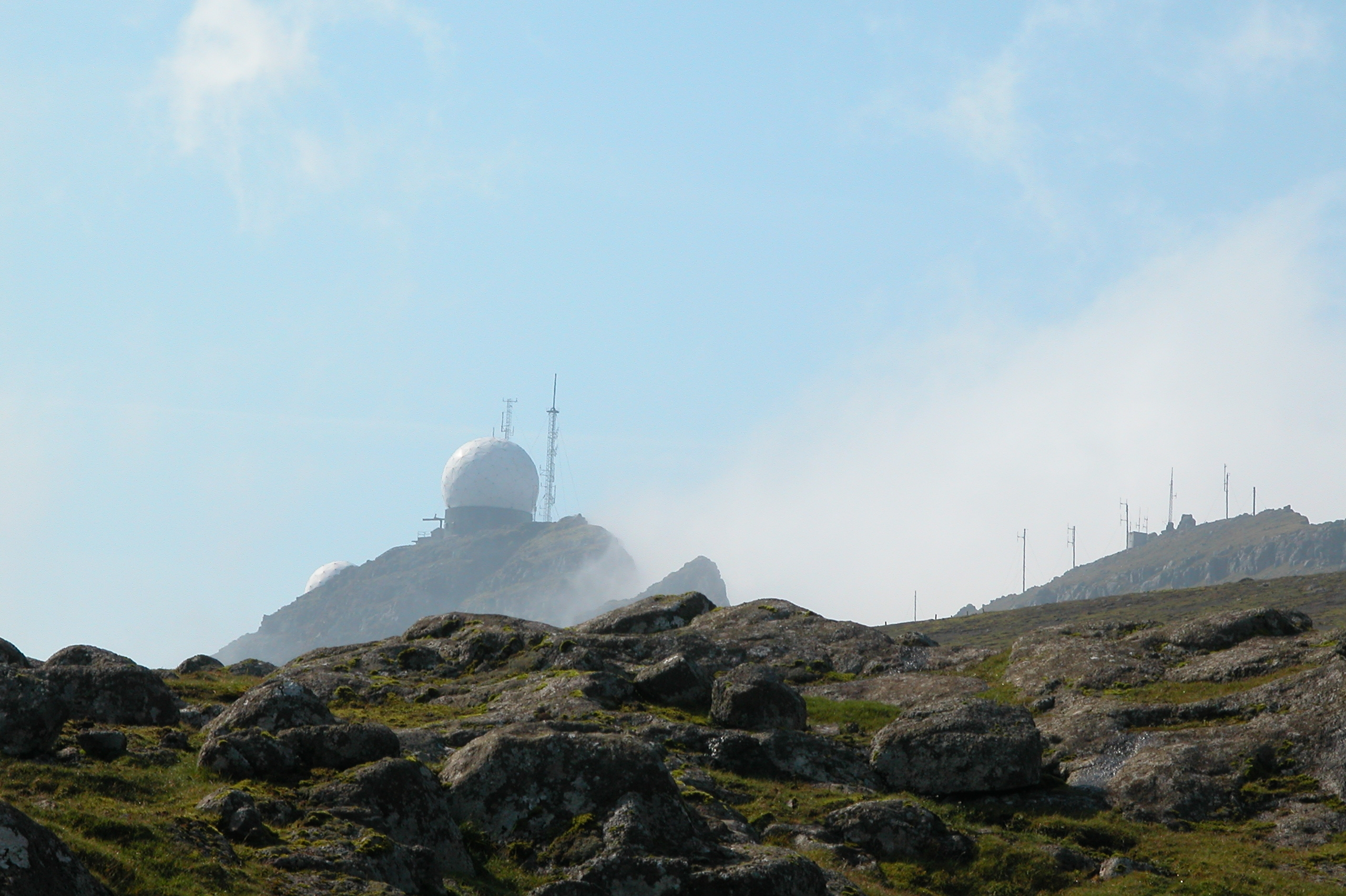
- Radar station at Sornfelli

- Location in the Faroe Islands
- Coordinates: 62°3′N 6°58′W
- State: Kingdom of Denmark
- Constituent country: Faroe Islands
- Island: Streymoy
- Municipality: Tórshavnar kommuna

Population (30 April 2025)
  - Total: 0
- Time zone: GMT
  - Summer (DST): UTC+1 (EST)
- Postal code: none

Mjørkadalur is a valley on the Faroese island of Streymoy in the Tórshavnar municipality. It has no postal code. It is located on the mountain of Sornfelli above the fjord of Kalbaksfjørður. The buildings in Mjørkadalur used to be part of the Island Command Faroes, but now a part of the building is used as a detention centre for prisoners who serve short sentences. Criminals from the Faroe Islands who serve longer sentences are sent to prisons in Denmark, as the detention centre only has room for 12 inmates.

== History ==
It was the site of a Danish military installation (Island Command Faroes) and NATO early warning radar system on Sornfelli until the Danish authorities closed it, and handed the key of the building to the Mayor of Tórshavn on 2 July 2002. The radar continued to work until 1 January 2007. Earlier up to 200 persons from the Danish defense were living in Mjørkadalur. On 15 November 2010 the last equipment was shut down. Sornfelli was also part of the North Atlantic Radio System, with tropospheric scatter links to NAS Keflavik and RAF Mormond Hill.

Since 10 February 2011 the building in Mjørkadalur has been the only detention of the Faroe Islands. It used to be in Tórshavn, but due to problems with mold in the building in Tórshavn, the detention was moved to Mjørkadalur.

One of the smaller radars continues to serve civilian radar purposes for air traffic control purposes for ISAVIA and aviation VHF. Sornfelli also continues to serve civilian communications purposes for Føroya Tele.

In 2022, the Danish Government committed to reinstating a NATO military radar station on Sornfelli.

== The name Mjørkadalur ==
The location is at the head of a valley where the clouds can be seen forming to travel over nearby peaks. Mjørki means Fog in Faroese and Dalur means Valley, Foggy Valley.

== See also ==
- List of towns in the Faroe Islands
