= North Atlantic Radio System =

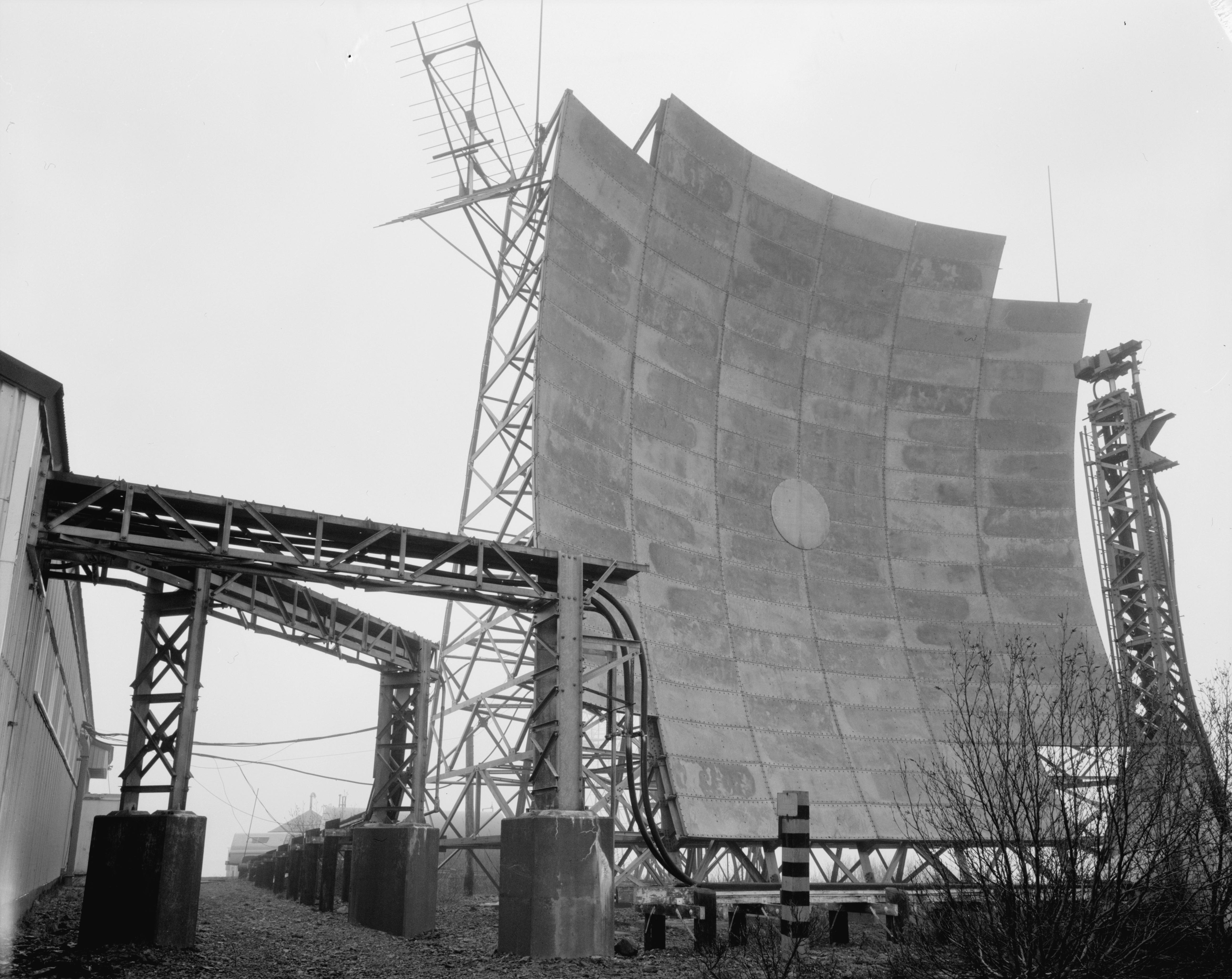
'Billboard' like antennas

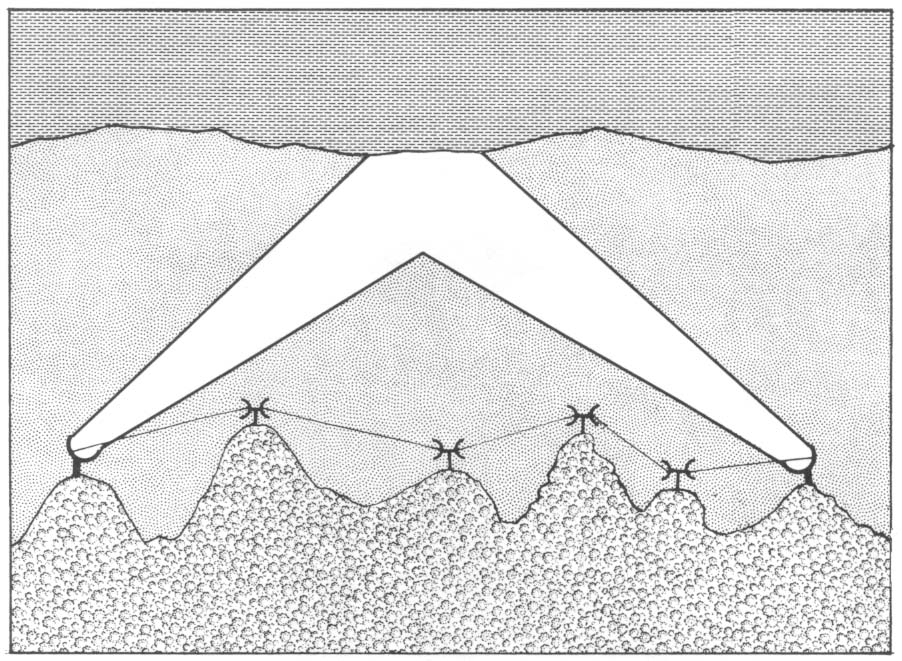
Troposcatter working

The North Atlantic Radio System (NARS) was a chain of 5 tropospheric scatter communication sites. It was an expansion of the former Distant Early Warning Line (DEW Line). NARS was built for the United States Air Force (USAF) by Western Electric (AT&T) and its sites were maintained under contract by ITT Federal Electric Corporation (now ITT Federal Services Corp.). All NARS stations were supervised and controlled by the USAF, by agreement with the Canadian and Danish governments.

== Previous systems ==
In the early 1950s, arctic surroundings and weather conditions of northern Canada made construction and manning of HF and VHF radio or microwave relay stations almost impossible. However, there was an urgent need for reliable data and communication facilities from the radar stations in the north to their control centers in the south.

The initial phase used tropospheric scatter radio communication. Powerful radio signals in the kilowatt range were scattered off the troposphere onwards to distant receiving stations. The receiving stations used gigantic billboard-like antennas, picking up just a fraction of the transmitted signal, meaning that the antenna and equipment maintenance and alignment had to be executed very carefully.

Construction of this system, code-named Pole Vault, started in 1954, became operational in 1955, and was extended in 1956. This troposcatter system had been supported by an undersea data cable system stretching from Thule airbase in Greenland via Cape Dyer to Newfoundland, Canada. The undersea cable system was unreliable, however, being cut many times by trawlers and icebergs. A better data transfer system was needed.

In 1962, the new SAGE system led to a gradual shutdown of the Pole Vault system. SAGE consisted of large computers and associated networking equipment that coordinated data from many radar sites and processed it to produce a single unified image of the airspace over a wide area. SAGE directed and controlled the NORAD response to a Soviet air attack, operating in this role from the late 1950s into the 1980s.

Construction of the large Ballistic Missile Early Warning System (BMEWS) radars at Thule, Greenland, Fylingdales, England, and another radar chain through Greenland, Iceland and the Faroe Islands, called for new powerful troposcatter communication stations linking all these radar sites to the NORAD headquarters in Colorado. This communication chain became known as the North Atlantic Radio System (NARS).

== Equipment and configuration ==
The NARS used AN/FRC-39(V) and AN/FRC-56(V) transmitting and receiving equipment, manufactured by Radio Engineering Laboratories, which could be configured for 1 kW, 10 kW or 50 kW power output depending on the range and/or quality of signal required.

NARS sites were configured for 10 kW output, with the exception of site 41 in both directions and site 42's connection to site 41, which used 50 kW. Each set consisted of 2 transmitters and 4 receivers, for redundancy, and to boost signal to noise ratios. The vacuum tube technology proved time-consuming to maintain at high levels of efficiency. The 50kW shots used 120 ft antennas and the 10kW shots used 60 ft antennas. The equipment was configured for quad diversity, using polarity diversity, space diversity, frequency diversity, and combiner diversity. This was typical for most troposcatter communications over difficult paths.

Levels of service proved extremely variable with the effects of weather and finicky equipment frequently causing loss of connection. Improvements were gained through better maintenance procedures but did not change significantly until the introduction of solid state technology. The system was able to transmit at 9.6 kbit/s, a very fast data connection at the time, by the time of closure.

== Closure ==
The system was closed down in 1992 after 30 years of service.

With the advent of satellite communications the days of the troposcatter networks were over, but NARS was closed down early due to the loss of the DYE-2 DEW Line station in 1988, severing the network's connection with the rest of the DEW line. Site 46 also had to close to make way for the new BMEWS Phased Array Radar at RAF Fylingdales.

== NARS sites ==
Sites of the North Atlantic Radio System

From 1960, five troposcatter sites were built.

- Site 41 – Rockville Air Station (H-1), near Naval Air Station Keflavik, at grid 64°02′07″N 22°39′16″W in the southwest of Iceland. This station was operational from 1952 to 1992. The west facing antennas and building were DYE-5 and Tech Control. This shot was a 50kW shot to DYE-4 in Kulusuk, Greenland. The east facing building and antennas was a 50 kW shot to NARS site 42 at Höfn, Iceland. The dividing line between the DEW Line system and the NARS system was between the two buildings. Today the site is closed, the troposcatter antennas are gone and all buildings have been removed.
- Site 42 – Hofn Air Station (H-3), at Stokksnes, near Höfn, Iceland at grid 64°14'38"N 14°57'50"W was a dual-purpose troposcatter radio relay site, sharing its location with the USAF/NATO radar station at Hofn from 1961 – 1992 until its closure. The site was linked to Site 41 (Keflavik, Iceland) and to Site 43 at Sornfelli Tórshavn (Faroe Islands) by 235 and 292 mile shots respectively. It had two 120 ft antennas operating at 50 kilowatt for the Keflavik shot, and two 60 ft antennas operating at 10 kilowatt for the Sornfelli Tórshavn shot. This site also was the entry point for the SOSUS system. When satellite communications made the troposcatter communications system obsolete, Site 42 was shut down along with the rest of the NARS system in 1988. Remaining idle through the end of manned operations at Hofn Air Station, the troposcatter antennas and support buildings have been demolished in the mid-1990s with the rest of the air station. The concrete blocks for the billboard antennas and feed horns still remain.
- Site 43 –Sornfelli, near Tórshavn, Faroe Islands at grid 62°4'1"N 6°58'0"W was a Danish installation (Island Command Faroes) and NATO early warning radar system consisting of 2 radars until closure in 2002. One of the radars is currently still operating as a civilian air traffic control radar. This site had troposcatter shots to site 44 and to site 42.
- Site 44 – RAF Mormond Hill at grid 57°36'13"N 2°1'58"W in the northeast of Scotland was home to several troposcatter antennas operated by USAF - providing comms to and from RAF Buchan via site 46 - the British Army and British Telecom. After USAF closure the site was transferred to the MoD in 1993 and is now used by British Telecom.
- Site 46 – RAF Fylingdales at grid 54°21'32"N 0°39'50"W station was built by the RCA in 1962. It was originally maintained by RCA but later was operated and maintained by ITT/FELEC. This site consisted of a 10kW shot to site 44 and a 10kW shot south that eventually interfaced with the 486L Mediterranean Communications System and the rest of Europe.

== See also ==
- Radio propagation
- Microwave
- ACE High - Cold war era NATO European troposcatter network
- White Alice Communications System - Cold war era Alaskan tropospheric communications link
- List of White Alice Communications System sites
- TV-FM DX
- List of DEW Line Sites
- Distant Early Warning Line
