= Óshyrna =

Icelandic mountain

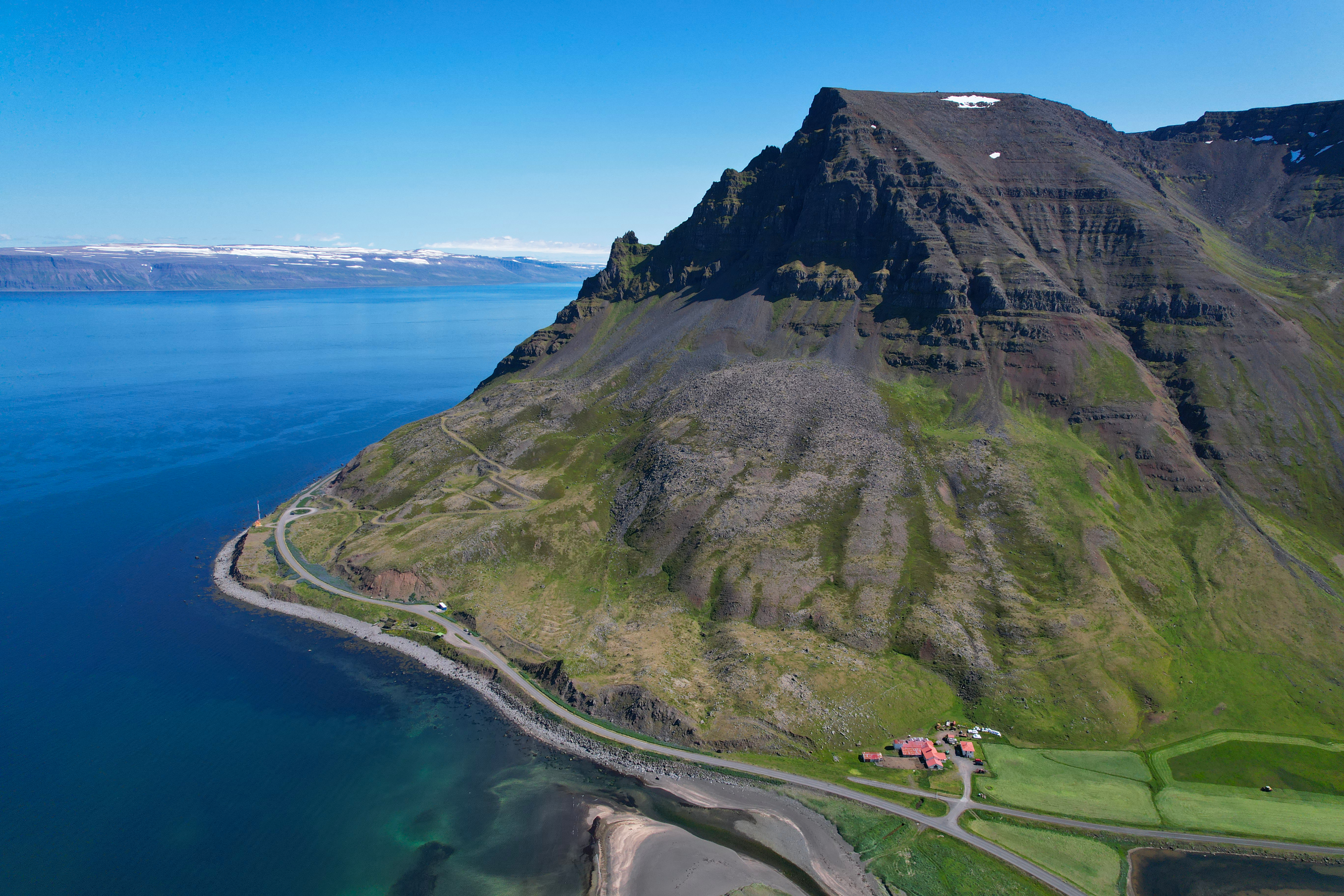
- Mount Óshyrna in Bolungarvík

Geography
- Location: Westfjords, Iceland

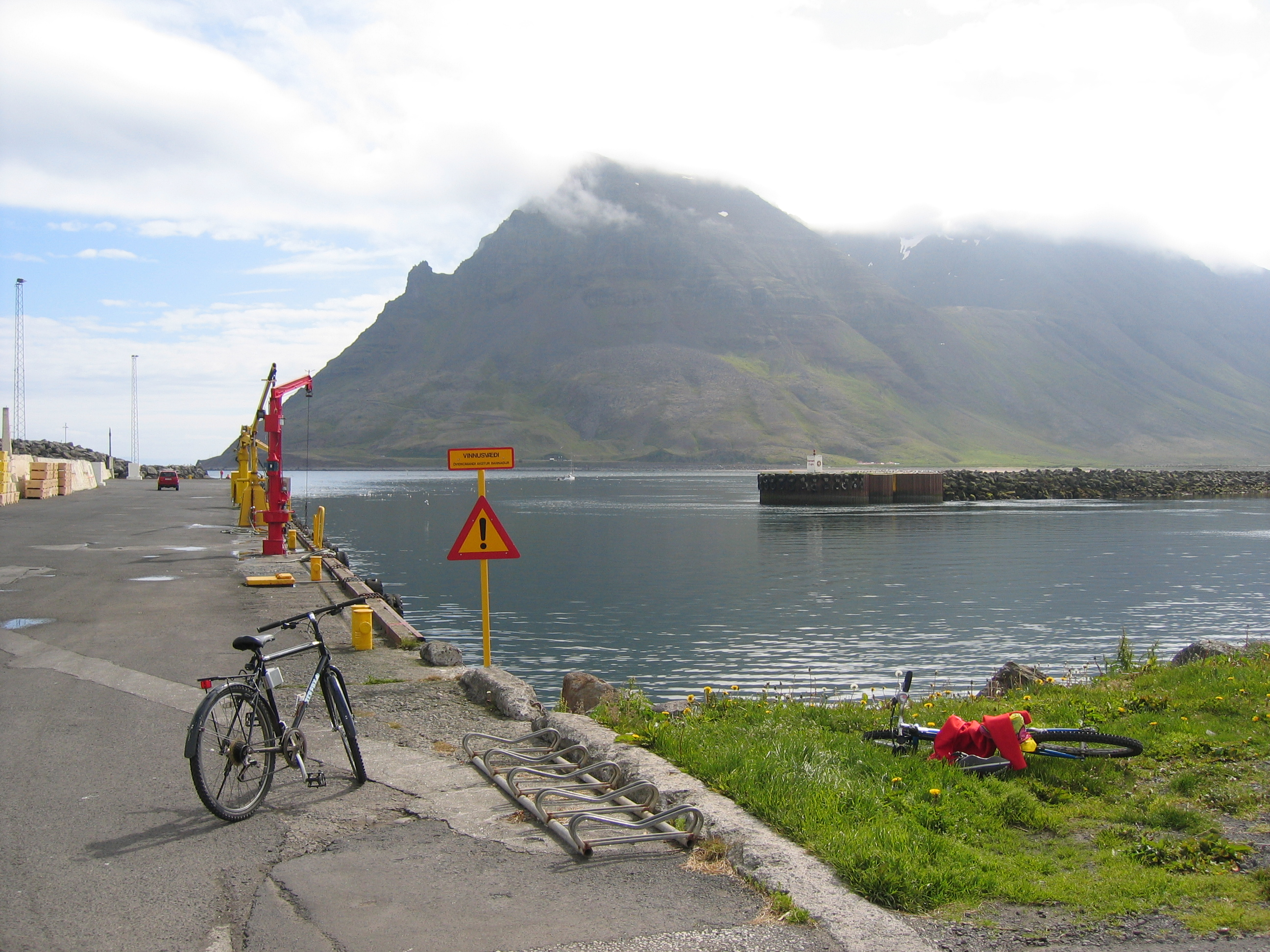
Mount Óshyrna seen from the harbour in Bolungarvík

Óshyrna (Icelandic pronunciation: [ˈousˌhɪ(r)tna]) is a mountain in the Westfjords in Iceland. It is the outermost part of the mountain slope between Ísafjörður and Bolungarvík. The old road to Bolungarvík lies between Óshyrna and the ocean. The Óshlíð [ˈousˌl̥iːθ] road is one of Iceland's most dangerous roads because of frequent avalanches and rock falls. The road has four emergency shelters along its route.

== Sources ==
- Oshlid
