= Aðalvík =

Bay in Iceland

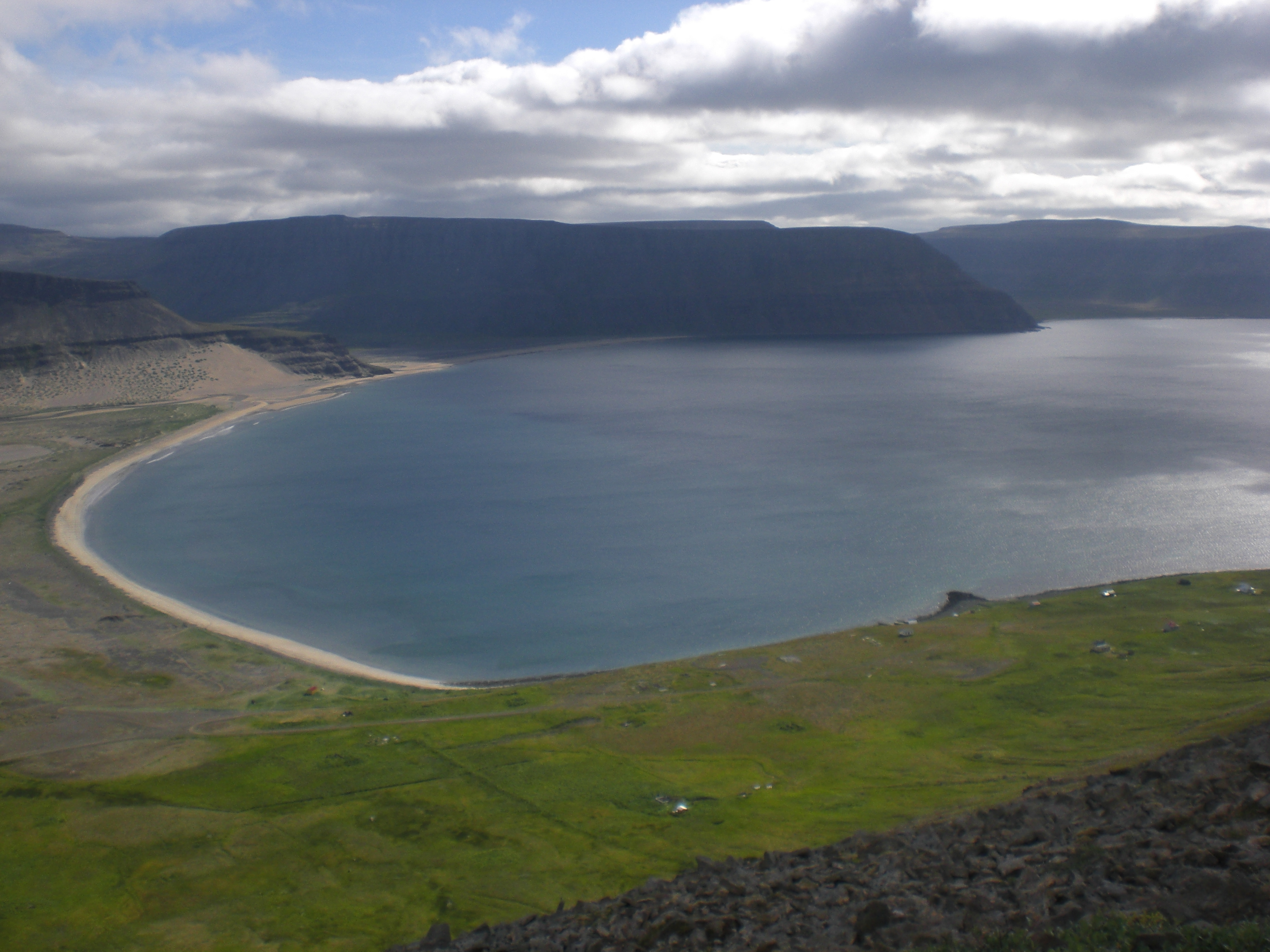
- A view of Aðalvík taken from above Látrar.

- Location within Iceland
- Location: Hornstrandir, Iceland
- Coordinates: 66.379°N 23.119°W

Aðalvík is a bay located in the southwest part of Hornstrandir on Iceland. The bay splits into three main locations, the former fishing villages of Látrar (120 inhabitants in 1920) and Sæból (80 inhabitants in 1900) and Miðvík. All of the settlements were abandoned in the middle of the 20th century. The last inhabitants moved from Látrum and Sæból in October 1952. In Sæból and on the mountain above it, named Darri, the British occupation force built a military base during World War II, which remains can still be seen, including remains of anti-aircraft guns, buildings, roads and railway tracks. In Látrar and on Straumnesfjall, the United States Air Force built a radar station named Straumnes Air Station. An airstrip was also built just outside the village. Jakobína Sigurðardóttir wrote the poem Hugsað til Hornstranda to protest the military activity there.
