= Iceland Air Defence System =

Air surveillance branch of Iceland's military

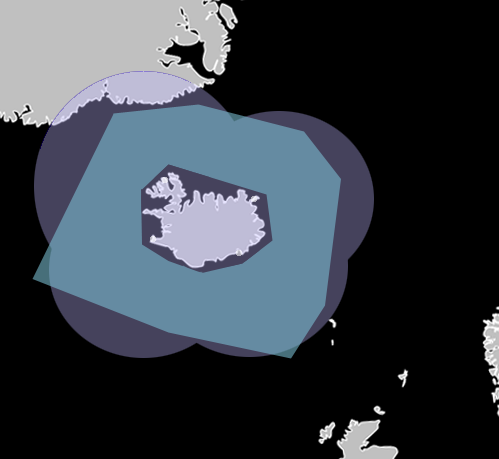
Iceland Air Defence System Radar Coverage and Air Defence Zone. Air Defence Zone Icelandic air sovereignty starts Approximate Radar coverage The four circular "bubbles" are visible

The Iceland Air Defence System (Icelandic: Íslenska loftvarnarkerfið) is a part of the Icelandic Coast Guard, funded by NATO. It operates four radar complexes, a software and support facility as well as a command and report centre.

It is primarily used to monitor all military and civilian air traffic and direct allied interceptors based out of country and forms part of the NATO Integrated Air Defense System.

== Sites ==
The four facilities are located at the four extreme intercardinal points of Iceland:

- H-1 Miðnesheiði on the Reykjanes peninsula (south-west) 64°01′18.5″N 022°39′22.8″W
- H-2 Gunnólfsvíkurfjall on the Langanes peninsula (north-east) 66°08′40.5″N 015°05′21″W
- H-3 Stokksnes near Höfn (south-east) 64°14′26.7″N 014°57′45.9″W
- H-4 Bolafjall close to Bolungarvík in the Westfjords peninsula (north-west) 66°10′40.4″N 023°19′41″W

U.S. and NATO forces after WWII had already established quadrilateral radar coverage over Iceland using four radar sites at the same (or nearby) sites. H-1 and H-3 had been run by U.S. forces since WWII. Two older structures, H-2, Langanes Air Station (66°16′42.7″N 014°59′33.2″W) and H-4 Straumnes Air Station, were erected by the U.S. and NATO in the late 1950s but were abandoned and closed few years later due to high operation costs.

The new H-2 and H-4 sites erected in the 1990s were built almost three decades later, but within 30 km (18 mi) of the original H-3/4 locations.

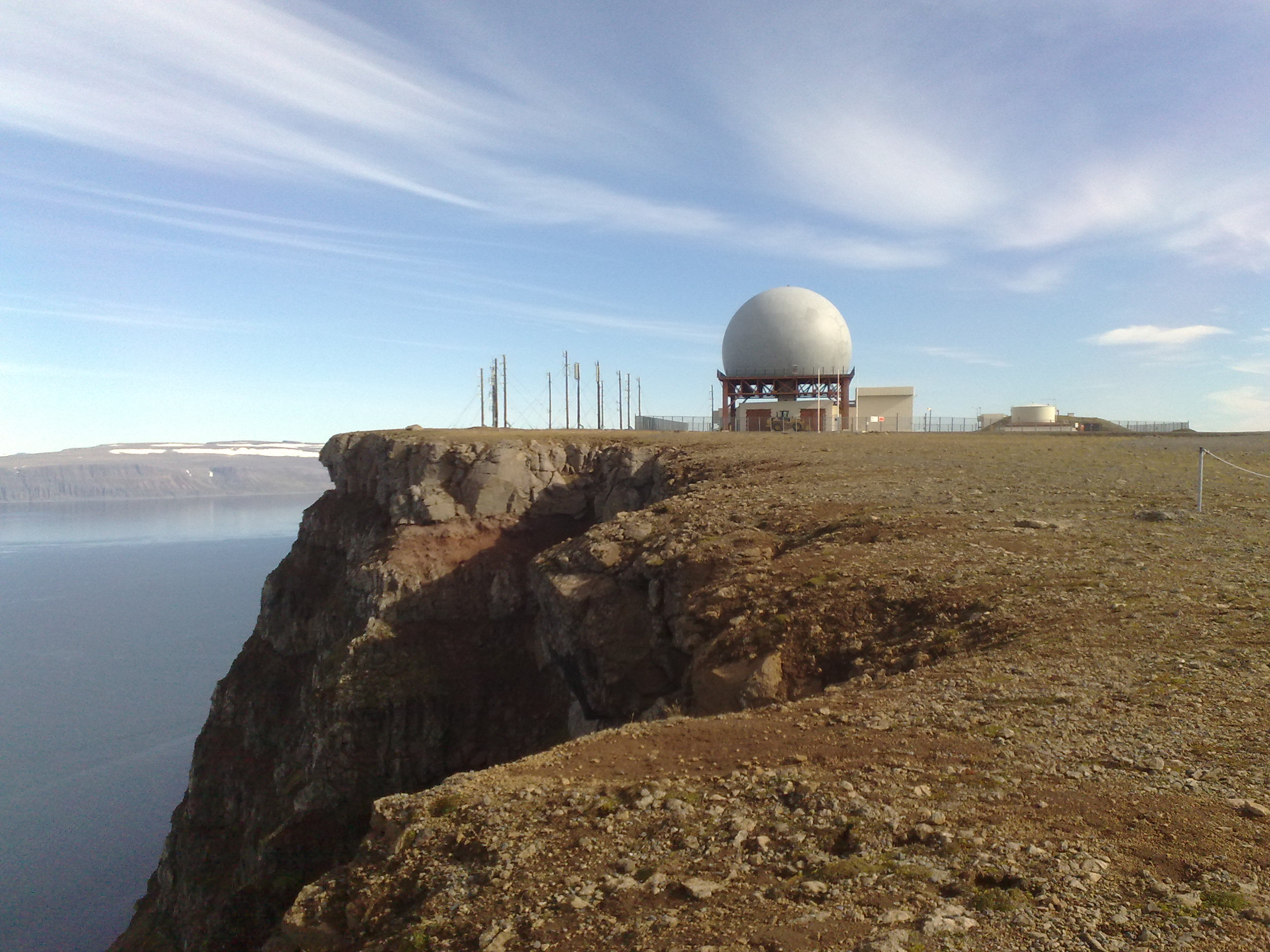
Iceland Air Defence System Radar Site at Bolafjall (H-4).

The new radar system was established in 1987 under the Icelandic Radar Agency (Ratsjárstofnun) on behalf of the Icelandic Ministry for Foreign Affairs after an agreement between Iceland and the United States on the takeover by the Icelanders of the operation and maintenance of radar stations of the Iceland Defense Force.

According to the U.S. Department of State website (Office of Public Diplomacy, Iceland page, updated August 2008), the 2008 budget for the Government of Iceland is the first in the country's history to include funding for defence (US$8.2 million); the money is earmarked for support of cooperative defence activities, military exercises in Iceland, and maintenance of defence-related facilities. This funding is in addition to roughly US$12 million in new expenditures for the operation of the Iceland Air Defence System radar sites, which the United States handed over to Iceland on August 15, 2007. At the start of 2010 Iceland Air Defence reported having a force of 25 employees.

== See also ==
- Military of Iceland
- Icelandic Coast Guard
- Icelandic Air Policing
