= Hornafjörður =

Fjord in south-east Iceland

Coordinates: 64.295113°N 15.228306°W

Hornafjörður (Icelandic pronunciation: [ˈhɔ(r)tnaˌfjœrðʏr̥]) is a small fjord in southeastern Iceland. The town Höfn is located on its shores, and the Stokksnes headland is nearby.

It was the arrival point on Iceland for the world's first aerial circumnavigation flight in August 1924.
