= Law enforcement in the Faroe Islands =

The Føroya Politi or Løgregla Føroya (Faroe Islands Police) are an independent police district within Denmark. The chief constable, who is known as the 'Landsfúti' is based in Tórshavn.

== See also ==
- Rigspolitiet - National police of Denmark
- Faroese coast guard
