= 667th Air Control Squadron =

667th Aircraft Control and Warning Squadron
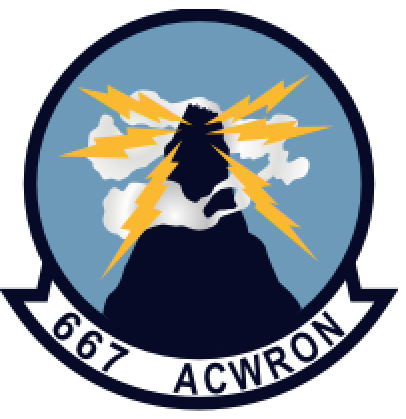
- Emblem of the 667th Aircraft Control and Warning Squadron
- Active: 1949-1952, 1952-1988
- Country: United States
- Branch: United States Air Force
- Type: General Radar Surveillance

The 667th Aircraft Control and Warning Squadron is an inactive United States Air Force unit. It was last assigned to the Air Forces Iceland, stationed at Hofn Air Station, Iceland. It was inactivated on 30 September 1988.

From 1951-1988, the unit was a General Surveillance Radar squadron providing for the air defense of Iceland and the North Atlantic.

== Lineage ==
- Established as 667th Aircraft Control and Warning Squadron

Activated on 8 December 1949
Inactivated on 6 February 1952

- Reactivated on 1 July 1952

Inactivated on 30 September 1988

Assignments

- 542d Aircraft Control and Warning Group, 8 December 1949 - 6 February 1952
- 65th Air Division (Defense), 1 July 1952
- Iceland Air Defense Force, 8 Mar 1954
- 1400th Operations Group, 18 Dec 1955
- Air Forces Iceland, 1 July 1960 - 30 September 1988

Stations

- Hamilton AFB, California, 1 January 1951 - 6 February 1952
- Langanes Air Station, Iceland, 1 July 1952
- Hofn Air Station, Iceland, 1 July 1960 - 30 September 1988
