= 934th Air Control Squadron =

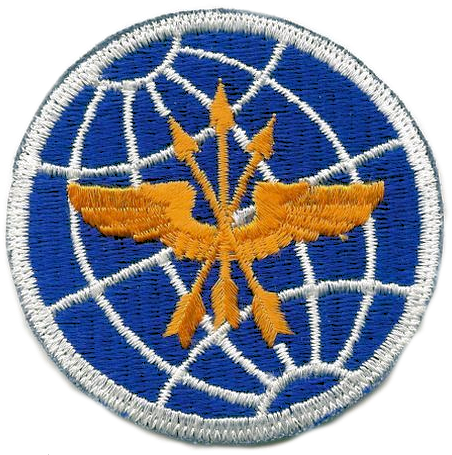
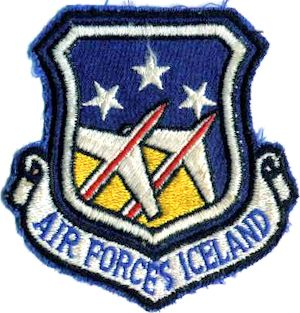
934th Air Control Squadron

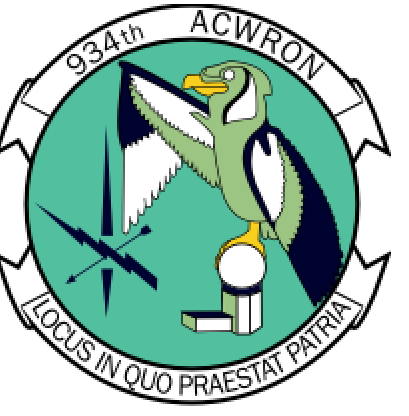
- Emblem of the 934th Aircraft Control and Warning Squadron
- Active: 1956–1960
- Country: United States
- Branch: United States Air Force
- Type: General Radar Surveillance
- Part of: Air Forces Iceland
- Motto(s): Locus in Quo Praestat Patria

The 934th Aircraft Control and Warning Squadron is an inactive United States Air Force unit. It was last assigned to the Air Forces Iceland, stationed at Latrar Air Station (H-4), Iceland. It was inactivated on 8 October 1960.

From 1956 to 1960, the unit was a General Surveillance Radar squadron providing for the air defense of Iceland and the North Atlantic.

== Lineage ==
- Constituted as the 934th Aircraft Control and Warning Squadron

Activated on 8 September 1956
Inactivated on 8 October 1960

Assignments

- 1400th Operations Group, 8 September 1956
- Air Forces Iceland, 1 July 1960 – 8 October 1960

Stations

- Keflavik Airport, Iceland, 8 September 1956
- Latrar Air Station, Iceland, 20 May 1957 – 8 October 1960
