= Hofn Air Station =

Former United States Air Force radar site in Iceland

Hofn Air Station (H-3)
- Part of Icelandic Coast Guard

Site information
- Type: Military base
- Controlled by: Icelandic Coast Guard

Location
- Location of Hofn Air Station, Iceland
- Coordinates: 64°14′28″N 014°57′47″W

Site history
- Built: 1951
- Built by: U.S. Air Force
- In use: 1951–1992, 1992-present

Hofn Air Station (ADC/NATO ID: H-3) was a United States Air Force General Surveillance Radar station at Stokksnes near Höfn in Hornafjörður. It is located 231.4 miles (372.4 km) east of the closed Naval Air Station Keflavik, Iceland. U.S. presence left on 30 June 1992.

In 1992 a new radar station was constructed on the same site as H-3 Stokksnes as part of the Iceland Air Defence System operated by the Icelandic Coast Guard, still in use as of 2025.

== History ==
Hofn Air Station was established as a North Atlantic Treaty Organization (NATO) radar station under Military Air Transport Service. The 933d Aircraft Control and Warning Squadron was activated at the facility on 1 July 1951. Initial radars at the station were an AN/FPS-3; AN/FPS-20A, and an AN/FPS-6 height finder. The nearest airport was Höfn Airport.

The Greenland, Iceland and United Kingdom air defense sector, better known as the GIUK gap, was routinely utilized by the Soviet Union's long-range heavy bombers and maritime reconnaissance platforms as a transit point towards the Atlantic Ocean. From bases located at Archangel and Murmansk, Soviet aircraft would stream down to the North Cape in Norway towards the Gap which was use as a doorway to the vast Atlantic. Most of the Soviet missions were destined to probe United States’ air defense along the North Atlantic and after 1960 in the Caribbean where Cuba, the USSR's most important satellite state outside continental Europe, was located. Such was the perceived threat from the Soviet incursions that it became a priority for NATO to demonstrate to that the strategic Giuk passage would be monitored at all times.

The mission of the station was to intercept and shadow all Soviet aircraft in transit in and from the Gap which passed through the detection range of its radars and pass the information to interceptor aircraft deployed at Keflavik Airfield.

The 933d AC&W Squadron was inactivated on 30 June 1960, being replaced by the 667th Aircraft Control and Warning Squadron. Beginning in 1984, information on aircraft detected by the station was relayed to the Keflavik NAS Radar Operations Control Center (ROCC), operated by the 932d Air Control Squadron. In the 1980s, the radar as the station was upgraded to an AN/FPS-117v5.

Hofn Air Station was a link in the North Atlantic Radio System, as Site 42. The tropospheric antennas at Hofn connected to NAVFAC Keflavik and Sornafelli (Site 43), Faroe islands.

Hofn Air Station was a known monitoring site of the SOSUS submarine detection network. Submarine cables emanated from Hofn to the Faroe Islands to monitor the GIUK gap, monitored by NAVFAC Keflavik. The system was inaugurated in 1966 and decommissioned in 1996.

=== Closure and new role ===
Hofn Air Station was inactivated on 30 June 1992 when all U.S. military personnel left.

Under the Icelandic Radar Agency (Ratsjárstofnun), in 1992 a new radar station was constructed at Stokksnes as part of the Iceland Air Defence System now operated by the Icelandic Coast Guard.

== See also ==
- Iceland Air Defence System
- Icelandic Coast Guard
- SOSUS
- United States general surveillance radar stations
