= Bolafjall =

Mountain in Iceland

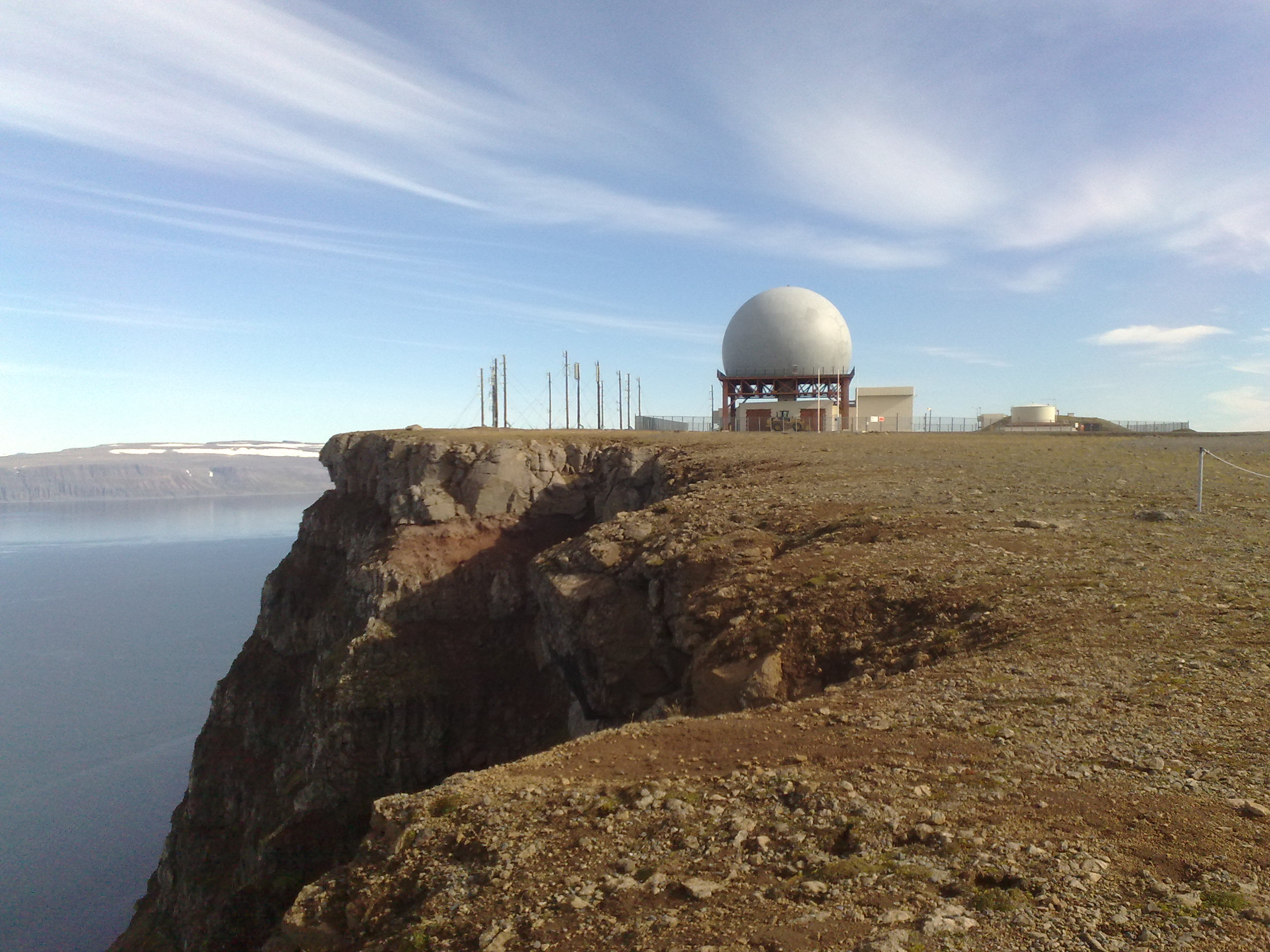

Highest point
- Peak: 638 m (2,093 ft)
- Coordinates: 66°10′40″N 23°20′55″W

Geography
- Location within Iceland
- Country: Iceland
- Region: Westfjords

Bolafjall is a 638 meter high mountain in the vicinity of Bolungarvík. A road was built to the top in 1986. In 2002 it was opened to civilian traffic. In 2022, an observation deck with a view over the Ísafjarðardjúp was opened on the mountain.

== Radar station ==
Bolafjall is home to one of the four radar sites of the Iceland Air Defence System. It was previously run by the Icelandic Radar Instituteon on behalf of the Icelandic Defence Force and NATO but is run by the Icelandic Coast Guard today. The radar station at Bolafjall began operation on January 18, 1992, but its operation is now under the care of the Coast Guard. There is a steep road up to Bolafjall. The road has been open to cars in July and August. On top of Bolafjall is a smooth, barren plateau and there is a view to all directions.
