= Straumnes Air Station =

Former radar station in Iceland

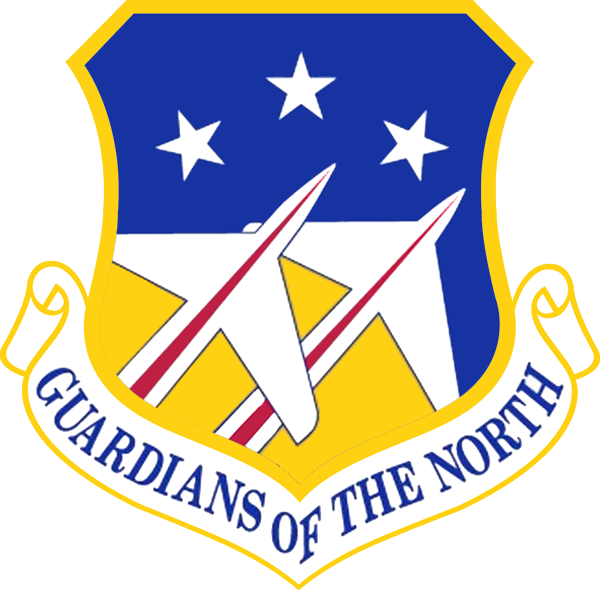
Latrar Air Station
- Part of Air Forces Iceland
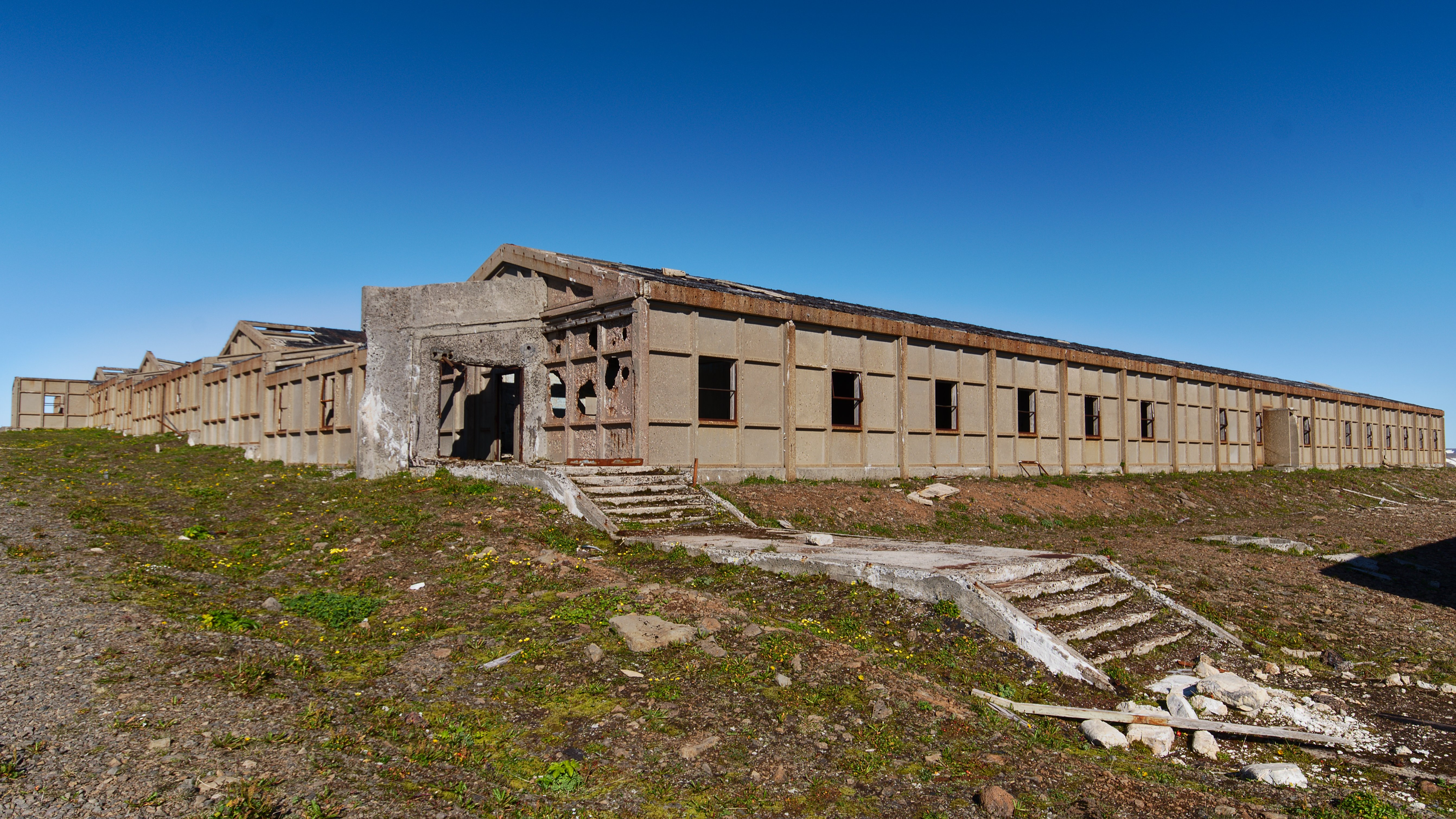

Site information
- Type: Air Force Station
- Controlled by: United States Air Force
- Condition: abandoned

Location
- Location of Latrar Air Station
- Coordinates: 66°25′49″N 023°05′34″W

Site history
- Built: 1953–1956
- In use: 1956–1960

Latrar Air Station (ADC/NATO ID: H-4), also known as Straumnes Air Station, is a former United States Air Force General Surveillance Radar station built in 1953-1956, located at the top of Mount Straumnes and in the former village of Látrar in the bay of Aðalvík, on the sparsely inhabited Hornstrandir peninsula. The station was closed in 1960 and has since been left to the elements.

The site was operated by the 934th Aircraft Control and Warning (later Air Defense, Later Air Control) Squadron, and was equipped with AN/FPS-3, AN/FPS-8 and AN/FPS-4 radars.

The Bolafjall (H-4) radar station, located approximately 30 km (18 mi) south of the Straumnes site was established in 1992 as part of the Iceland Air Defence System.

== History ==
Construction of the air station started in 1953 and it started operations in 1956. After only being in operation for four years, a decision was made to close the site in 1960 due to high operation costs and the last air force and civilian staff left the following year. In 1962, the Icelandic government took over ownership of the remaining buildings.

The Greenland, Iceland and United Kingdom air defense sector, better known as the GIUK gap, was routinely utilized by the Soviet Union's long-range heavy bombers and maritime reconnaissance platforms as a transit point towards the Atlantic Ocean. From bases located at Arkhangelsk and Murmansk, Soviet aircraft would stream down to the North Cape in Norway towards the Gap which was used as a doorway to the vast Atlantic. Most of the Soviet missions were destined to probe United States’ air defense along the North Atlantic and after 1960 in the Caribbean where Cuba, the USSR's most important satellite state outside continental Europe, was located. Such was the perceived threat from the Soviet incursions that it became a priority for NATO to demonstrate to that the strategic Giuk passage would be monitored at all times.

The mission of the station was to intercept and shadow all Soviet aircraft in transit in and from the Gap which passed through the detection range of its radars and pass the information to interceptor aircraft deployed at Keflavik Airfield.

The site was inaccessible except by sealift using a small pier usable only during a limited part of the summer season. The site was never equipped with tropospheric scatter communications (as H-1, H-2 and H-3 had been equipped) and relied on HF communications which were inadequate. The station was closed in 1960 as a result of high costs, inadequacy and redundancy.

After the site was closed, the facility lay abandoned. The buildings are difficult to reach and remain in a deteriorating condition, most without windows, abandoned to the elements. In 1991, a major cleaning operation was performed at the site, involving the Icelandic Defence Force and local SAR units. The site remains a popular hiking destination.

In the 1990s the Iceland Air Defence System was being established, and a location closer to transport links and population centres was chosen, and therefore a new H-4 was established at Bolafjall (H-4), near Bolugnarvík.

== See also ==
- Iceland Air Defence System
- Icelandic Coast Guard
- Bolafjall radar station (H-4)
- United States general surveillance radar stations
