= Stokksnes =

Headland in Iceland

Coordinates: 64.243°N 14.960°W

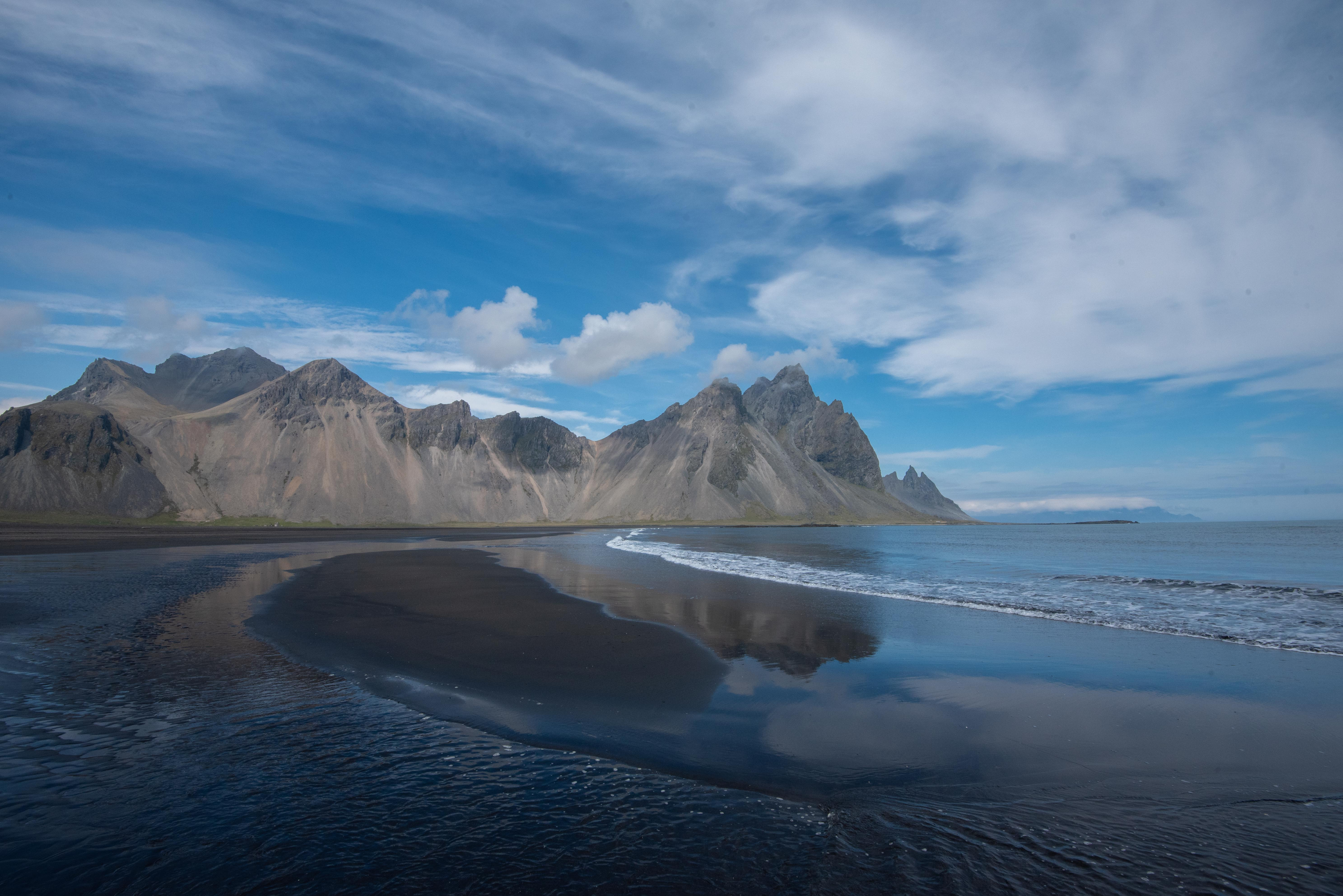
Stokksnes

Stokksnes (Icelandic pronunciation: [ˈstɔksˌnɛːs]) is a headland on the southeastern Icelandic coast, near Hofn and Hornafjördur. Stokksnes is located south of Kastarárfjall mountain, and includes Vestrahorn mountain, which was featured in the Bollywood film Dilwale.

The H-3 Radar Station Stokksnes is located at the tip of the headland. The Iceland Air Defence System uses the station to monitor Iceland's airspace.
