= Arctic policy of the Faroe Islands =

Faroese government policy

The Arctic policy of the Faroe Islands is a part of the Faroese government's policies and through the joint strategy of the Kingdom of Denmark, as well as within the Arctic Council.

The general policy outlines the country's approach to Arctic affairs, including its geopolitical position, environmental concerns, economic opportunities, and collaboration with other Arctic nations.

Located in the middle of the North Atlantic ocean, The Faroe Islands' continental shelf extends north of the Arctic Circle.

The environmental, economic and political changes in the Arctic have great significance for the Faroe Islands, as melting ice and new shipping routes bring opportunities for increased fishing, shipping, and tourism.

== Faroese interests ==
The Arctic policy of The Faroe Islands consists of eight strategic policy areas. These areas include:

- Stability and Security
- International Cooperation
- Environment, Nature, and Climate
- Research, Knowledge Advancement, and Education
- Preparedness and Response
- Living Marine Resources
- Economic Opportunities and Sustainable Development
- Culture and Society

Some of these areas hold more significance and carry greater weight than others. The following paragraph provides examples of these areas.

=== New shipping routes ===
Increased melting of ice and opening of new shipping routes are expected to lead to greater opportunities for fishing, shipping, and tourism in the North Atlantic and Arctic regions, including the Faroe Islands. The Faroe Islands are well-positioned to benefit from these changes, with increased shipping traffic, and opportunities for local businesses to provide services to foreign ships.

One of The Faroe Islands' goals is to position themselves as a maritime service center in the North Atlantic. Wanting to offer services to passing ships in the Arctic. These plans were presented in the Faroese Arctic Strategy in 2013.

Increased traffic places significant demands on the Faroe Islands' infrastructure and requires careful planning to mitigate potential risks. The growth in activity brings increased risk of accidents and environmental damage.

=== Fishery and sustainability ===
One of the biggest Faroese interests in the Arctic area is fishing. The Faroe Islands prioritize sustainable fishing in the Arctic and collaborate with international organizations to prevent illegal practices. They plan to establish an ecosystem-based fisheries management system and participate in scientific research to promote sustainability in the region.

The Faroe Islands aim to follow the work of the International Council for the Exploration of the Sea (ICES) in the Arctic and pursue sustainable activities under the multilateral agreement. Fishing is crucial for the economic and social well-being, and they hope to contribute to sustainable business growth and research collaborations in the region. For the same reason The Faroe Islands are involved in Arctic environmental cooperation and contribute to international efforts to address climate change.

The status as a fishing nation, also gives the Faroe Islands a significant role to play in the Arctic Council and other international cooperation. The Faroe Islands focus on working for the rights to sustainably use marine resources.

=== Research ===
Research is a key part of the Faroese strategy to strengthen cooperation in the Arctic. In 2017, the Faroe Islands signed an international agreement under the Arctic Council to strengthen research collaboration in the Arctic. The Faroe Islands aim to become a center of excellence in various fields, including marine biology and resources, meteorology, natural sciences, technology, communication, energy, public health, social sciences, and humanities.

Faroese specialists have participated in working groups under the Arctic Council from the beginning.

== Defence and security ==
It is anticipated that there will be increased military activity in the Arctic in the future, making it important that the Faroe Islands are involved in decisions related to defense actions in the Arctic.

According to the home rule law, security and defense matters are shared responsibilities and cannot be taken over in the current situation. Making cooperation with the Danish government, NATO, and other NATO member countries in the region essential.

One significant change in the Danish–Faroese relationship is the increased involvement of the Faroe Islands in the upcoming Danish defense agreement. The current defense agreement is set to expire at the end of this year.

=== US and NATO ===
Geopolitical changes in the Arctic has resulted in a renewed interest from the US due to the Faroe Islands strategic location in the North Atlantic Ocean.

In June 2022, an agreement was made between Denmark and the Faroe Islands to set up a NATO air surveillance radar on the mountain Sornfelli in the Faroe Islands. The radar will monitor the airspace between Iceland, Norway, and the United Kingdom, and is planned to have a range between 300 and 400 kilometers. A radar will strengthen Danish Defense's surveillance over the North Atlantic which is a wish from the U.S. and NATO.

== In the Kingdom of Denmark ==
As part of the Kingdom of Denmark, the Faroe Islands are also part of the Kingdom's joint Arctic strategy. The strategy from 2011 to 2020, included equal involvement of all three parties (Faroe Islands, Greenland, and Denmark) in decision-making. The goal in 2011 was to maintain low tension in the Arctic region in a peaceful and sustainable manner.

Denmark's Arctic strategy expired in 2020. A new one has not yet been developed as they wait for Greenland. The new strategy is expected to be ready in 2023.

In 2016, Peter Taksøe-Jensen concluded that Denmark is an Arctic great power because of Greenland and the Faroe Islands, making the Danish Arctic Policy in many ways dependent on them.

Faroese interests are not necessarily aligned with Danish or American interests.

== The Arctic Council ==
The Faroe Islands are members of the Arctic Council in delegation with Denmark and Greenland.

Every other year there is a ministerial meeting of the Arctic Council that the Faroese Government representative participates in.

Faroese officials also participate in the SAO (Senior Arctic Official) meetings, which are the highest level of meetings, as well as in the meetings of the SDWG and PAME working groups, in addition to other relevant meetings.

The majority of issues addressed in the Arctic Council concern topics that the Faroe Islands have a say in. The Faroe Islands prioritize ensuring that they are present to influence and develop the decisions made in the Arctic Council to be suitable for the Faroese interests. The interest being particular focused on natural resources, sustainable fishing, research, and culture.

The 2019 Faroese foreign policy report aimed to pursue independent membership in the Arctic Council. The same goal is not in the 2022 Arctic Strategy, but one of the objectives of Faroese arctic policy is to enhance the Faroe Islands' influence within the Arctic Council.
