= Island Command Faroes =

- Færøernes Kommando
- Active: 1 June 1961–31 October 2012
- Countries: Denmark; Faroe Islands
- Allegiance: Denmark
- Part of: Royal Danish Navy; Royal Danish Air Force
- Headquarters: Mjørkadalur, Faroe Islands

Island Command Faroes (Danish: Færøernes Kommando; ISCOMFAROES) was the military unit on the Faroe Islands. It was the military command of the Faroe Islands, the Faroe Islands airspace and the Faroe Islands territorial waters. It supported the local government with military advice as well as search and rescue capabilities. Island Command Faroes was amalgamated with Island Command Greenland to a Joint Arctic Command on 31 October 2012.

== History ==
Faroes Marine District (Danish: Færøernes Marinedistrikt) was established on 5 September 1951 in Tórshavn.

On 1 June 1961, the district name was changed to the Faroe Islands Command, and on the same date, the Marine Station Thorshavn was created as an authority.

In 1963, the Marine Station at Hoyvíksvegur 58 was built and became the new home of the Faroe Islands Command, which until 1979 consisted of the command authority (Faroe Command), the Marine Station, and Naval Radio Tórshavn. From amalgamation in 1979 until the establishment of the Arctic Command on 31 October 2012, the Faroe Islands Command was the joint authority name.

On 1 January 2001, the new Level II authority was established, which was called the Faroe Islands Command.

On 2 July 2002, there was a ceremony where the Dannebrog (Danish Flag) was hauled down for the last time at the Marine Station in Tórshavn. The key to the buildings was then handed over to Tórshavn's mayor. The final relocation was a reality and Mjørkadalur became the new home of the Faroe Islands Command.

In 2005, the Danish government decided that all activities on the mountain of Sornfelli should be shut down on 15 November 2010.

The NATO radar installations which had been established in 1963 in Mjørkadalur on the mountain of Sornfelli at 749 metres above sea level, were a link in the defence of the Arctic Circle. The radar installation was closed at a small ceremony on 1 January 2007 after more than 40 years.

It is permitted for civilians to travel on the mountain road up to the radar facility, which offers a panoramic view of the Faroes.

Since 10 February 2011 a part of the main building in Mjørkadalur has been used as a detention centre by the Danish Police in the Faroe Islands; this came about due to problems with mould in the former locations of the detention centre. The Danish defence forces handed over the buildings in Mjørkadalur to the Faroese government in 2013.

== Commanding officer ==
Commanders of Island Command Faroes have been:

No.	Portrait	Name (born–died)	Term of office			Ref.
No.	Portrait	Name (born–died)	Took office	Left office	Time in office	Ref.
Faroes Marine District
1		Commander; Carl Henrik Axel Madsen (1898–1980)	1 September 1951	15 June 1956	4 years, 288 days	
2		Commander captain Jørgen Frederik Tønnesen Lolle (1908–1962)	November 1956	November 1958	2 years	
3		Commander captain Aage Palsgaard (1910–?)	21 November 1958	31 May 1961	2 years, 191 days	
Island Command Faroes
1		Commander captain Aage Palsgaard (1910–?)	1 June 1961	5 October 1962	1 year, 126 days	
2		Commander captain Aage Lauvrits Muusfeldt (1908–?)	5 October 1962	15 January 1965	2 years, 102 days	
3		Commander captain Kai Aage Nolsøe Bang (1915–?)	1 March 1968	19 May 1972	4 years, 79 days	
4		Commander captain Aage William Thorsen (1923–?)	21 May 1972	28 August 1974	2 years, 99 days	
5		Commander captain Paul Erik Axel Reib (1923–?)	28 August 1974	20 June 1977	2 years, 296 days	
6		Commander captain Kjeld Søderlund (1926–?)	20 June 1977	14 August 1979	2 years, 55 days	
–		(act.) Commander; Mogens Rørly (1930–?)	14 August 1979	30 September 1979	47 days	
7		(act.) Commander; Mogens Rørly (1930–?)	1 October 1979	31 August 1981	1 year, 334 days	
8		(act.) Commander; Søren Ulrich Haae Laub (1927–?)	31 August 1981	1983	1–2 years	
9		(act.) Commander; Jørn Daniel Brusendorff (1935–?)	20 October 1983	30 April 1985	1 year, 192 days	
19		Captain; Per Starklint (born 1954)	10 September 2007	31 October 2012	5 years, 51 days	
