= Sornfelli =

Mountain plateau on Streymoy, Faroe Islands

Coordinates: 62°05′0″N 6°50′0″W

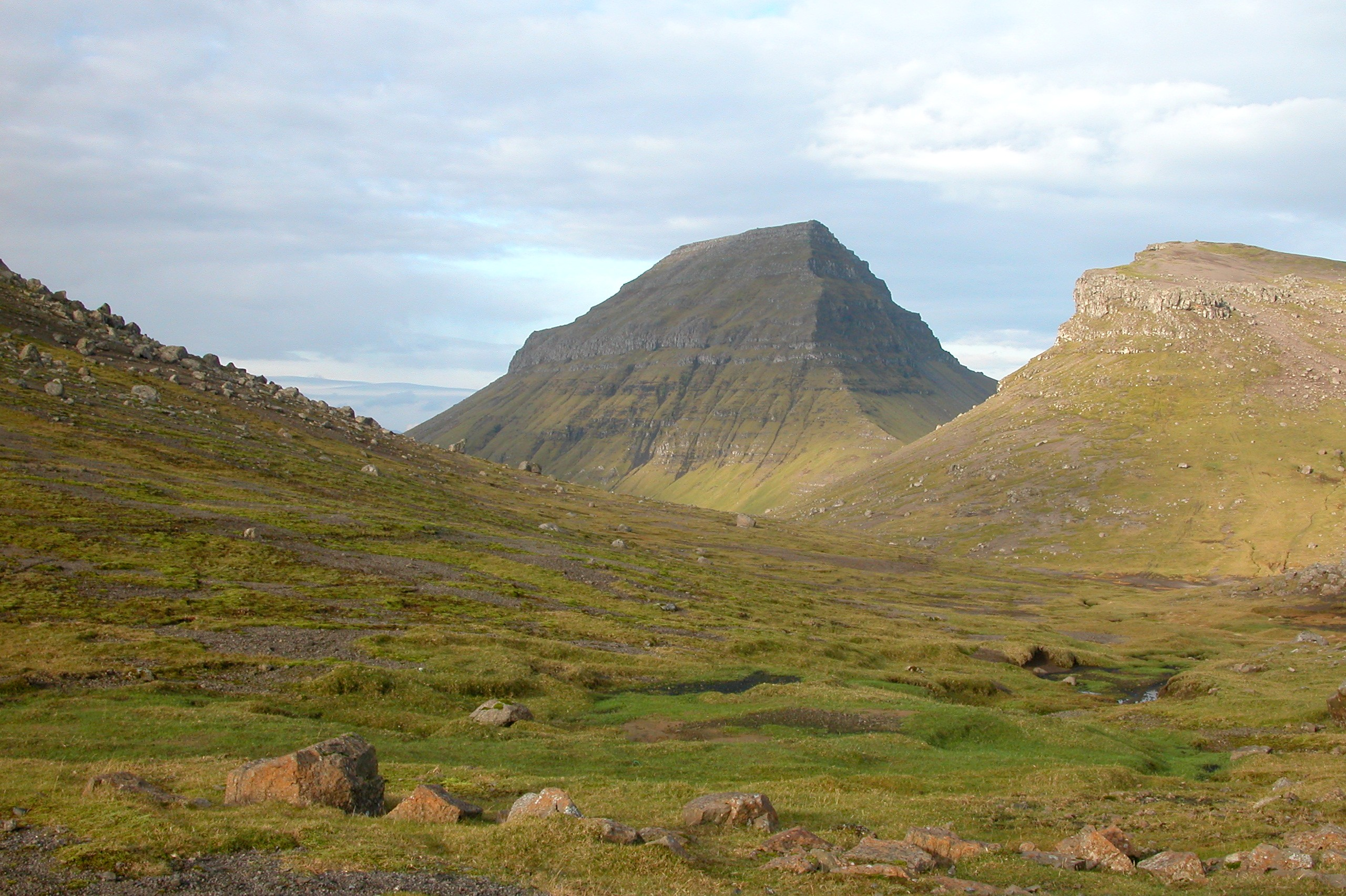
The mountain of Skælingsfjall has a height of 749m

Sornfelli is a mountain plateau on the island of Streymoy in the Faroe Islands about 12 km from the capital Tórshavn (20 km by road), in the Mjørkadalur valley. It is the site of a NATO military radar station at 725m above sea level (asl).

The Sornfelli Meteorological Station installed in 1999 is located in the middle of the 40,000 m^{2} Sornfelli Mountain top plateau, also at 725m above sea level.

== Climate ==
Temperatures at the meteorological station in 2000 were:

- Mean annual air temperature: +1.7 °C
- Mean coldest month (April): −2.2 °C
- Mean warmest month (August): 6.5 °C

From Tórshavn you can drive over the mountain road "Oyggjarvegin" to the Sornfelli Mountain plateau. There is a public road up to the Sornfelli Mountain plateau, but not the last 200 m to the radar base. The mountain of Sornfelli has a height of 749m.

== Military base ==
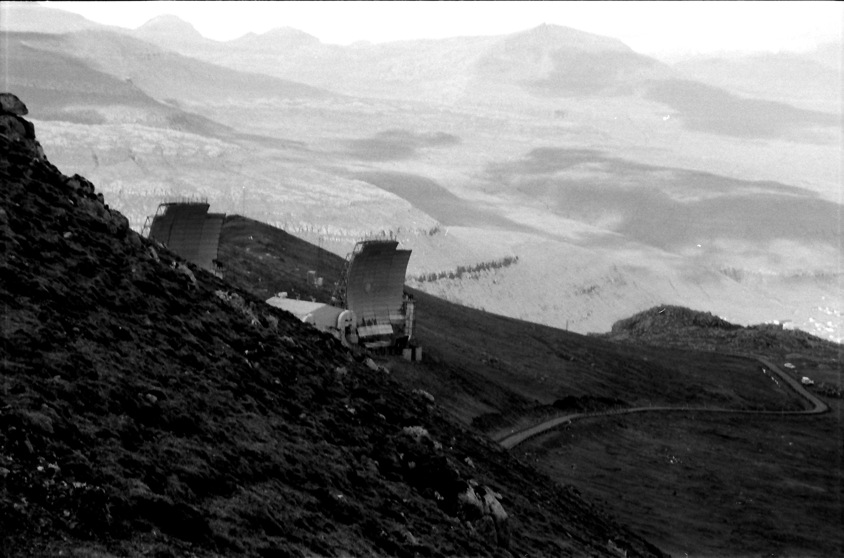
Sornfelli tropospheric scattar antennas, 1985.

Sornfelli was the site of a Danish military installation (Joint Arctic Command) and NATO early warning radar system until the Danish authorities closed it in 2002. Known as Site 43, it was also part of the North Atlantic Radio System and ACE High, with tropospheric scatter links to Hofn Air Station (H-3) and RAF Mormond Hill. There is a basic cable railway for freight, of a couple hundred metres to the top of the station, as the road does not reach the peak.

The radar station atop Sornfelli mountain was supported by a multi-storey bunker built inside the mountain. The main base of operations, which at its peak hosted up to 200 soldiers of the Danish military, was situated in the Mjørkadalur base. On 15 November 2010 the last equipment was shut down at the base.

One of the smaller radars continues to serve civilian radar purposes for air traffic control purposes for ISAVIA and aviation VHF. Sornfelli also continues to serve civilian communications purposes for Føroya Tele.

In 2022, the Danish Government committed to reinstating a NATO military radar station on Sornfelli.

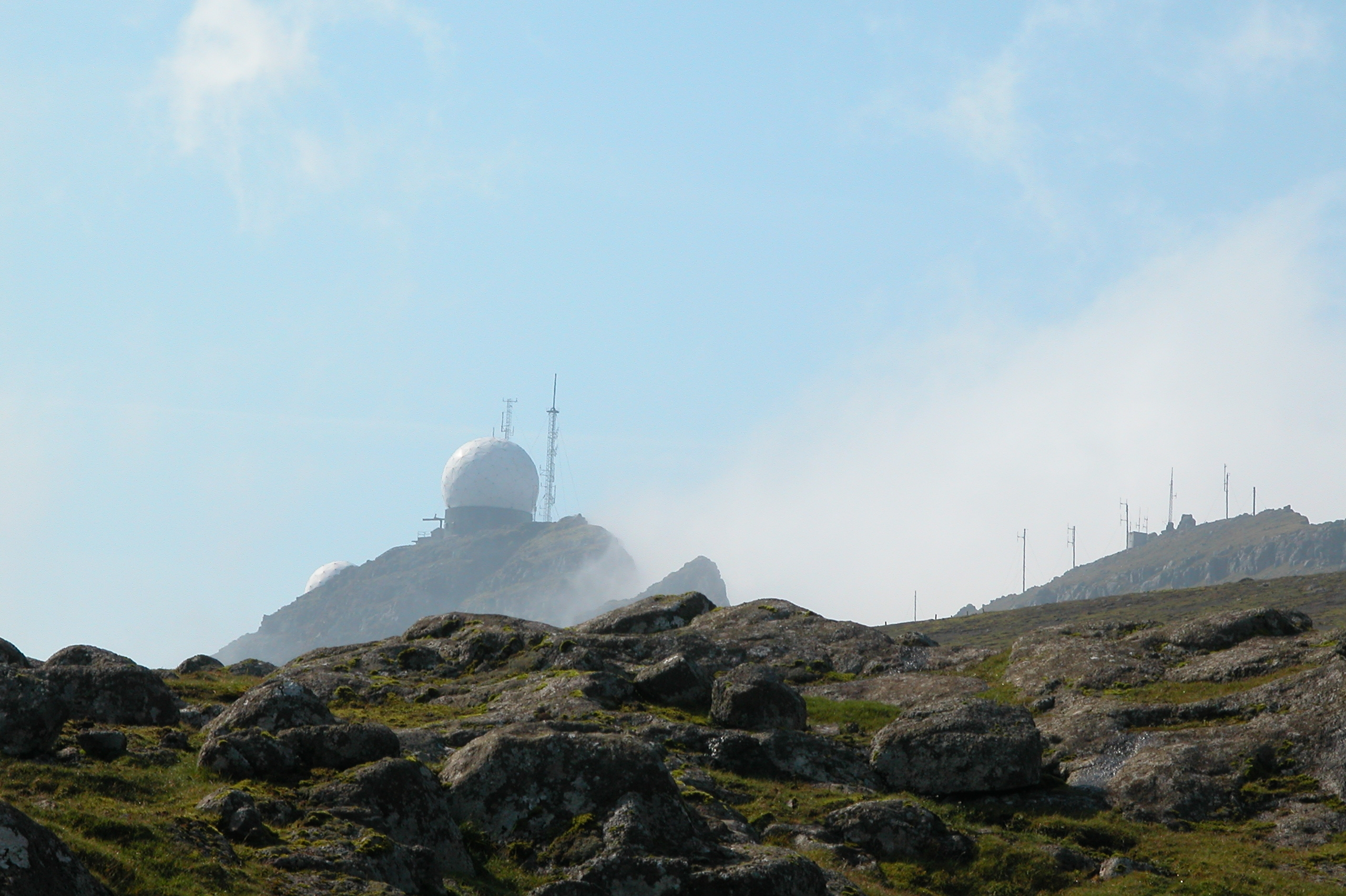
Radar base.

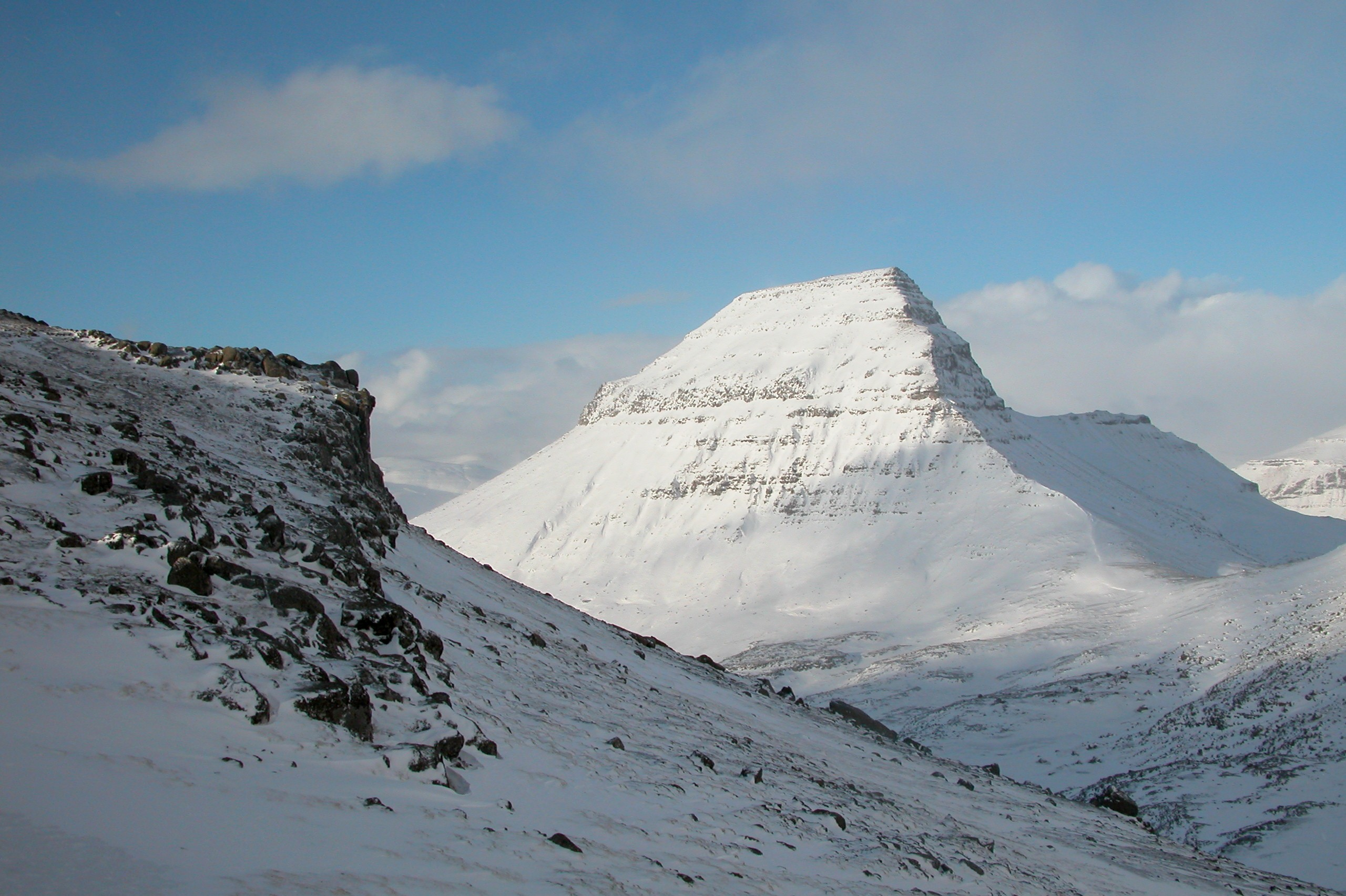
Skælingsfjall 749 m

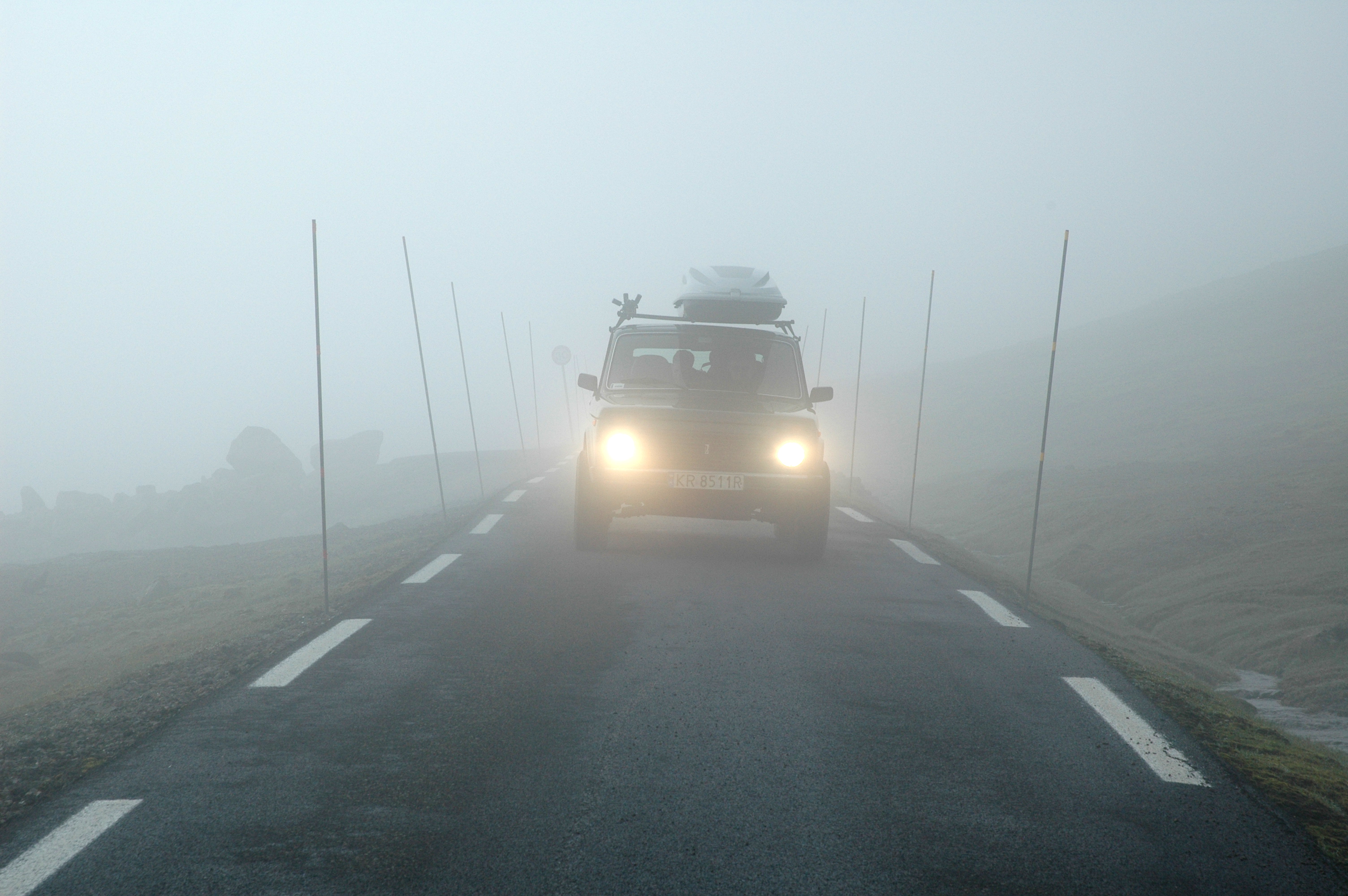
Road to Sornfelli
