= Bolungarvík =

Bolungarvíkurkaupstaður
- Municipality
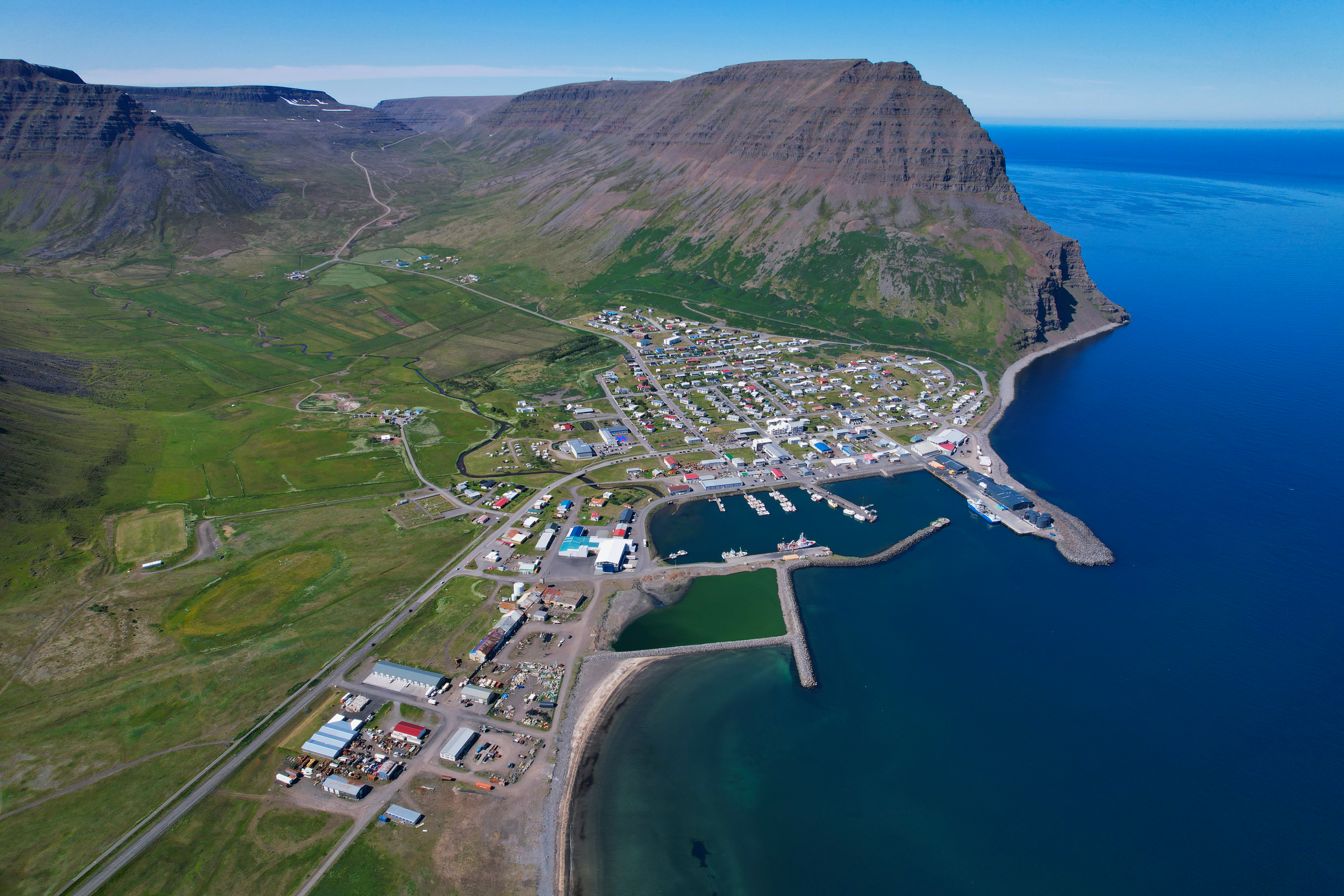
- Areal view of Bolungarvík

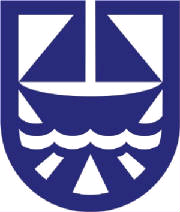
- Coat of arms

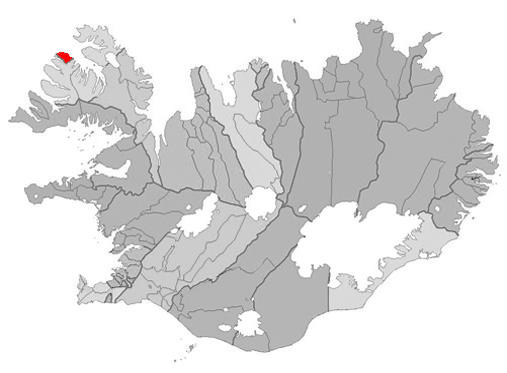
- Location of Bolungarvíkurkaupstaður

- Location within Iceland
- Coordinates: 66°09′27″N 23°15′03″W
- Country: Iceland
- Region: Westfjords
- Constituency: Northwest Constituency

Government
  - Mayor: Jón Páll Hreinsson

Area
  - Total: 109 km^{2} (42 sq mi)

Population (1 August 2024)
  - Total: 1,022
  - Density: 9.38/km^{2} (24.3/sq mi)
- Postal code(s): 415, 416
- Municipal number: 4100
- Website: bolungarvik.is

Bolungarvík (Icelandic pronunciation: [ˈpɔːluŋkarˌviːk], regionally also [-lʏŋk-]) is a small town and the only built-up area in the municipality of Bolungarvíkurkaupstaður in the northwest of Iceland, located on the Westfjords peninsula, approximately 14 km (8.7 mi) from the town of Ísafjörður and 473 km (294 mi) from the capital city Reykjavík.

Bolungarvík is close to abundant fishing grounds and has been used as an outpost for fishing since the 17th century, making it one of the earliest in Iceland. The village was not accessible by road until 1950, and in 2010 the Bolungarvíkurgöng tunnel was opened under the Óshlíð mountain to bypass the old road, which was frequently subject to avalanches and rock falls.

Tourist sites include the Ósvör Maritime Museum, featuring a restored 19th-century fishing hut, a natural history museum, which houses taxidermied animals including a polar bear and the biggest bird collection in Iceland, and an indoor swimming pool with outdoor hot tubs and a water slide. Skálavík bay can be reached by a gravel road from June through August, and that same road also leads to the top of the Bolafjall mountain (638 m.) with views of the village of Bolungarvík, the Latrar Air Station, the Ísafjarðardjúp fjord, the Jökulfirðir fjords, the Hornstrandir nature reserve and the Denmark Strait. The surroundings of Bolungarvík are destinations for hiking, horse riding, sea angling and birdwatching.

== History and folklore ==
According to Landnámabók, Þuríður Sundafyllir settled in Bolungarvík around 940 along with her brother Þjóðólfur. Folklore says they had a disagreement and put a spell on each other, as they were both skilled sorcerers. Þuríður laid on her brother that he would spend eternity as a monolith on which all birds would defecate. Þjóðólfur in turn hexed his sister that she would forever stand where the wind blows most. The pillar that was said to be Þuríður collapsed in half in 1936. The legend says that same night the cliff "Þjóðólfur" sank in the sea. That night their spell washed away into the sea.

== In popular fiction ==
- Bolungarvík was the location for Nói Albínói, a movie by Dagur Kári about a disaffected teenager living in a remote Icelandic village.
- Rúnar Rúnarsson's 2015 film Sparrows was partly filmed in Bolungarvík.
- The 2015 film Albatross by Snævar Sölvi Sölvason is set in Bolungarvík.

== Gallery ==
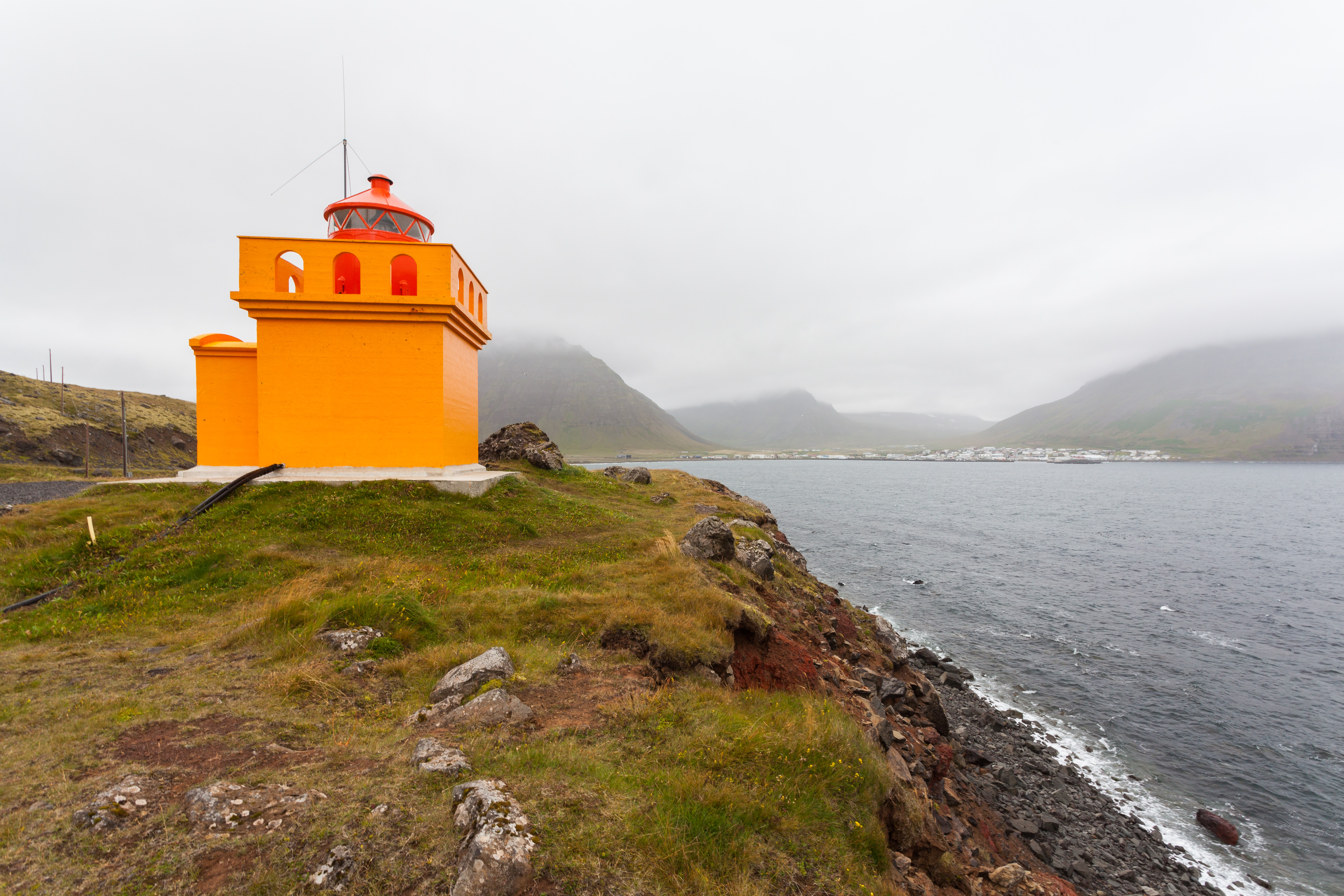
The lighthouse in Bolungarvík Óshólaviti

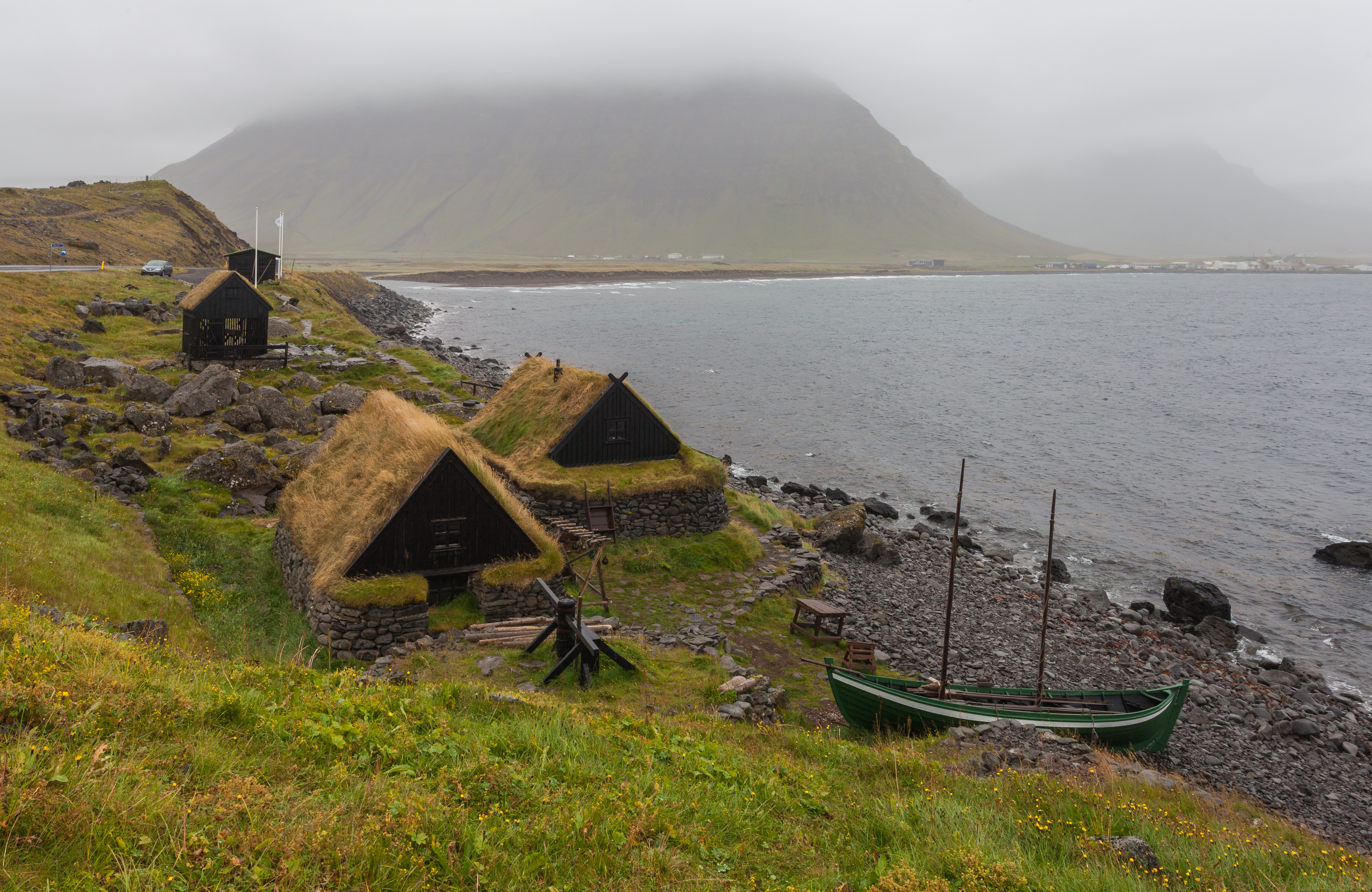
The Ósvör Maritime Museum

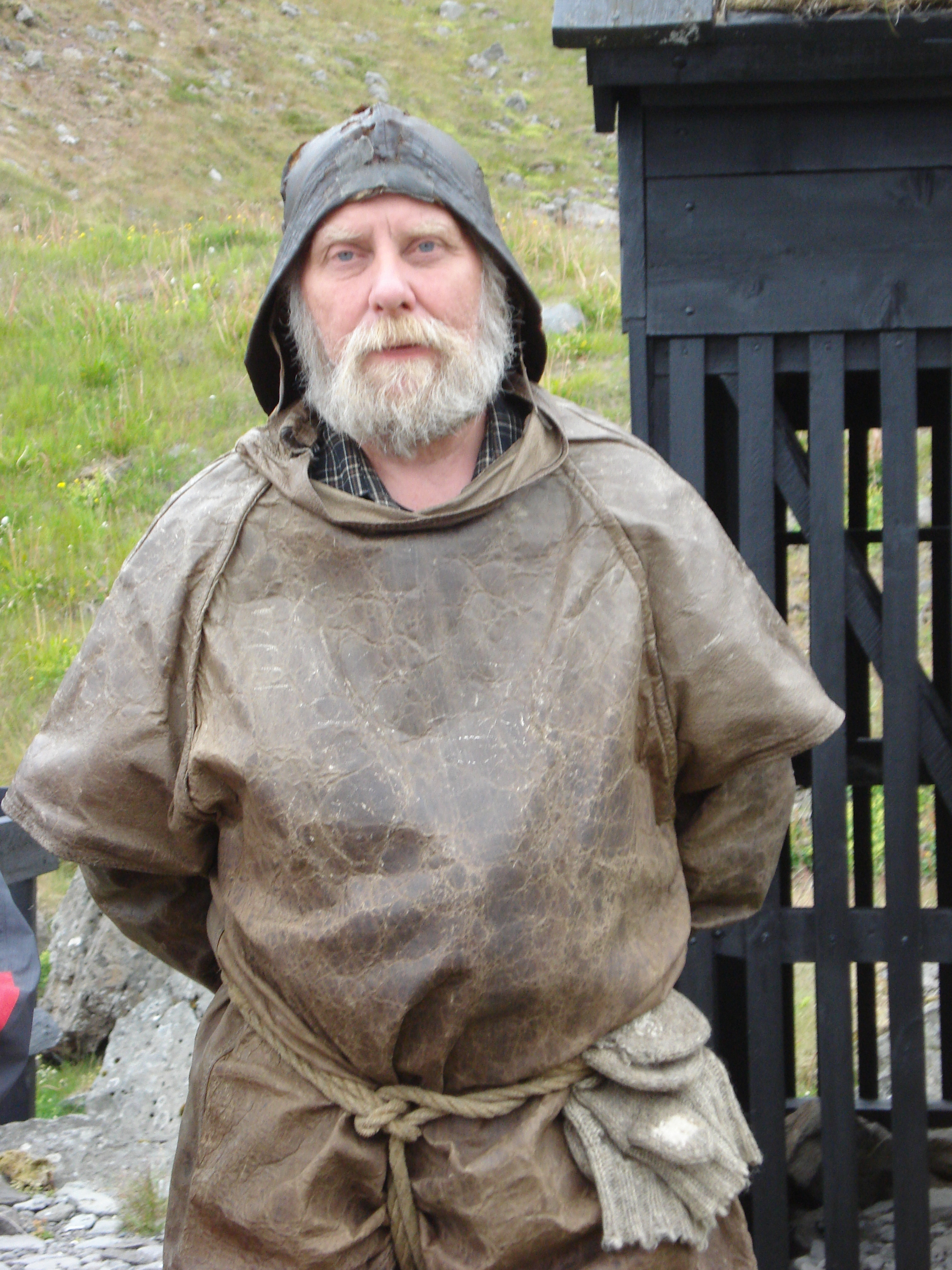
Bolungarvík fisherman

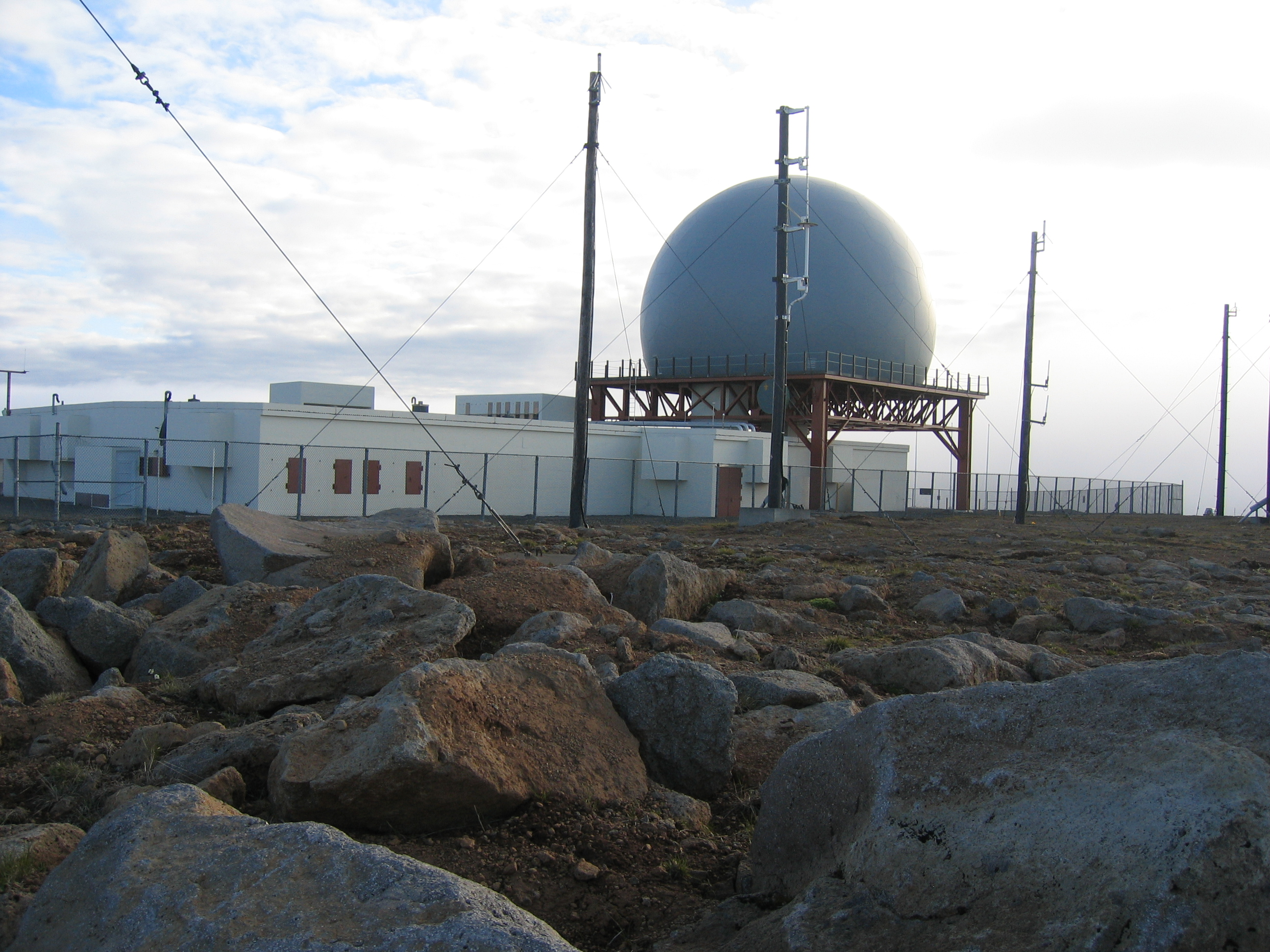
H-4A Air Radar Station atop Bolafjall

== Climate ==
Based on the climate data for the most recent reference period, Bolungarvík has either a subarctic climate (Köppen: Dfc) or a subpolar oceanic climate (Cfc) bordering very closely on a Tundra climate (ET), depending on the isotherm used.

Climate data for Bolungarvík
Month	Jan	Feb	Mar	Apr	May	Jun	Jul	Aug	Sep	Oct	Nov	Dec	Year
Mean daily maximum °C (°F)	2.6 (36.7)	2.1 (35.8)	2.4 (36.3)	4.6 (40.3)	7.9 (46.2)	12.0 (53.6)	13.7 (56.7)	13.1 (55.6)	10.4 (50.7)	6.1 (43.0)	3.8 (38.8)	3.0 (37.4)	6.8 (44.2)
Daily mean °C (°F)	−0.2 (31.6)	−0.6 (30.9)	−0.5 (31.1)	1.5 (34.7)	4.7 (40.5)	8.2 (46.8)	10.0 (50.0)	9.6 (49.3)	7.3 (45.1)	3.7 (38.7)	1.4 (34.5)	0.1 (32.2)	3.8 (38.8)
Mean daily minimum °C (°F)	−2.5 (27.5)	−3.3 (26.1)	−2.9 (26.8)	−0.9 (30.4)	2.1 (35.8)	5.6 (42.1)	7.4 (45.3)	7.3 (45.1)	5.4 (41.7)	1.6 (34.9)	−1.3 (29.7)	−2.5 (27.5)	1.3 (34.3)
Average precipitation mm (inches)	88.1 (3.47)	100.4 (3.95)	77.0 (3.03)	52.6 (2.07)	44.1 (1.74)	26.2 (1.03)	46.1 (1.81)	58.5 (2.30)	80.5 (3.17)	102.7 (4.04)	91.4 (3.60)	105.2 (4.14)	872.9 (34.37)
Source 1: Icelandic Met Office (daily mean temperature for the 1991-2020 reference period)
Source 2: Icelandic Met Office (other values, valid for 1995-2018)

== Panoramas ==
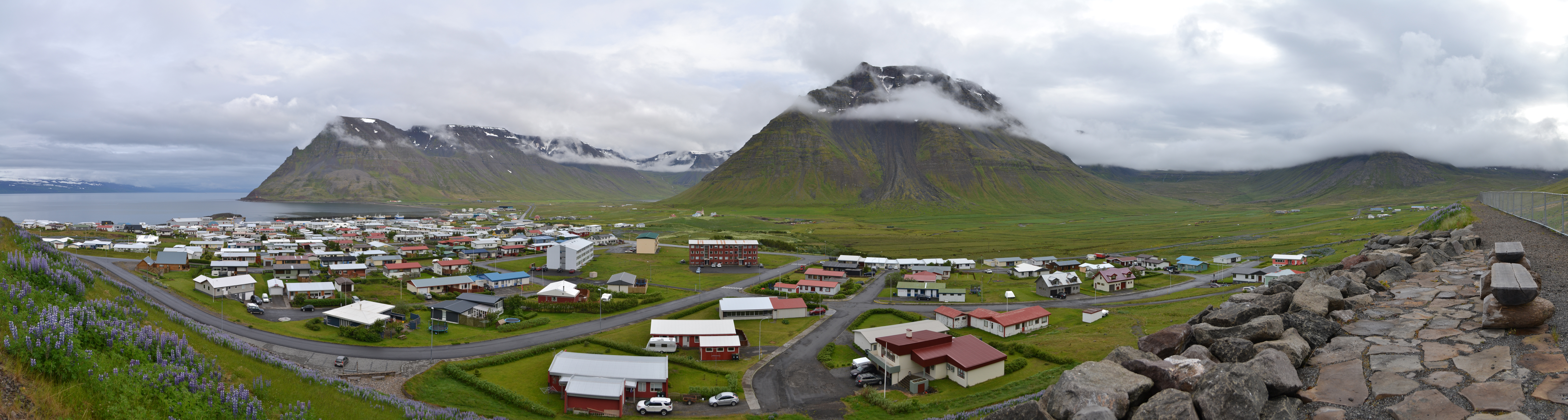
A panorama of Bolungarvik in the Westfjords, Iceland taken in July 2018.

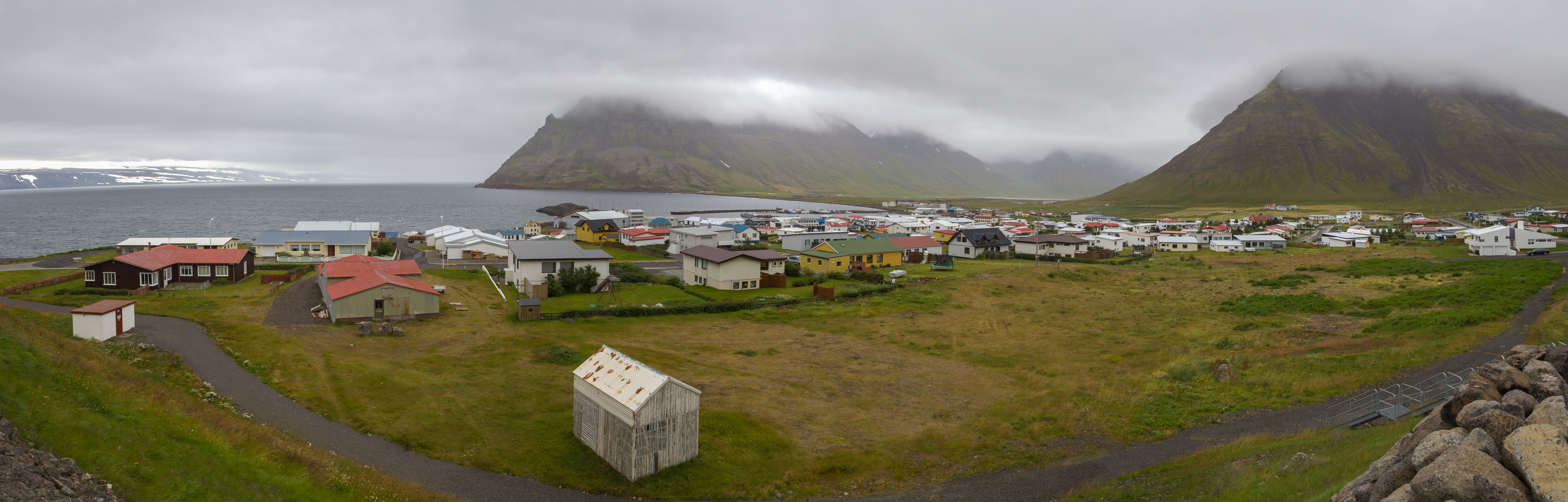
Panorama of the village of Bolungarvík
