= The Radar Agency =

- Ratsjárstofnun

Agency overview
- Formed: 1987
- Dissolved: 2008
- Type: Defence Agency
- Status: Dissolved
- Headquarters: Reykjavík
- Website: ratsjarstofnun.is

The Radar Agency (Icelandic: Ratsjárstofnun) was an Icelandic government agency that was under the Ministry for Foreign Affairs. It was founded in 1987 after the government of Iceland and the United States had entered into an agreement on the takeover by the Icelanders of the operation and maintenance of the radar stations of the Iceland Defense Force. It was dissolved in 2008 with its mission moved to the newly founded Icelandic Defence Agency (Icelandic: Varnarmálastofnun).
