= Sif (disambiguation) =

Sif is a Norse goddess and the wife of Thor.

Sif or SIF may also refer to:

== People ==
- Sif Atladóttir (born 1985), Icelandic footballer
- Sif Ríkharðsdóttir, Icelandic academic
- Sif Ruud (1916–2011), Icelandic actress
- Sif Rykær (born 1988), Danish footballer
- Sif Saga (born 1997), Icelandic model

== Characters ==
- Sif (character), the Norse goddess as portrayed in Marvel Comics
  - Sif (Marvel Cinematic Universe), the character's portrayal in the MCU
- Sif (Dark Souls), a character in the video game Dark Souls

== Places ==
- Sif, Yemen
- Sif Glacier, Greenland
- Sif Island, Antarctica

== Government and politics ==
- State Secretariat for International Finance, of the Government of Switzerland
- Society for Individual Freedom, a British association promoting individual freedom
- Somali Islamic Front, also known as Jabhatul Islamiya
- Strategic Innovation Fund, a program of the Government of Canada
- Syrian Islamic Front
- Statutes in Force, the 4th revised edition of the statutes in the United Kingdom

== Science and technology ==
- Italian Physical Society (Italian: Società Italiana di Fisica)
- Safety instrumented function
- Schools Interoperability Framework, a data-sharing specification
- Selective Identification Feature, used to identify aircraft
- Small intensely fluorescent cell
- Source Input Format, a MPEG-1 video format
- Standard Interchange Format, a format for geographic data
- Stress intensity factor, used in fracture mechanics to predict the stress state

== Sport ==
- Supreme Indoor Football, a defunct American sport league

=== Clubs ===
- SÍF Sandavágur, a Faroese football club
- Sandvikens IF, a Swedish football club
- Silkeborg IF, a Danish football club
- Stattena IF, a Swedish football club in Helsingborg
- Stavanger IF, a Norgwegian football and handball club
  - SIF Stadion, their home venue
- Stocksunds IF, a Swedish sport club in Stocksund
- Strømsgodset IF, a Norwegian sport club
  - Strømsgodset Toppfotball, their professional football team

== Transport ==
- AirSial, a Pakistani airline
- Rockingham County NC Shiloh Airport, in North Carolina
- Simara Airport, in Madhesh Province, Nepal
- TF-SIF (Dauphin 2), an aircraft operated by the Icelandic Coast Guard from 1985 until 2007
- TF-SIF (Dash 8), an aircraft operated by the Icelandic Coast Guard since 2009

== Other organizations ==
- Central European Institute of Philosophy (Czech: Středoevropský Institut Filosofie)
- Science of Identity Foundation, an American religious organization
- Seychelles Islands Foundation
- Shropshire Islamic Foundation
- Singapore International Foundation, a Singaporean charity
- Swedish Union of Clerical and Technical Employees in Industry (Swedish: Sif)

== Other uses ==
- 4484 Sif, a main-belt asteroid
- Siamou language
- Sif Mons, a shield volcano on Venus
- Specialized investment fund
- Love Live! School Idol Festival, a mobile game

== See also ==
- Short Interframe Space (SIFS), the small time interval between the data frame and its acknowledgment
