= List of aircraft of the Icelandic Coast Guard =

The following is a list of aircraft of the Icelandic Coast Guard, past and present. The Icelandic Coast Guard has operated 22 aircraft since the inception of its air wing, as well as having leased commercial aircraft on occasion for short-term missions, with their history being widely covered in the Icelandic media through the years.

== Airplane history ==
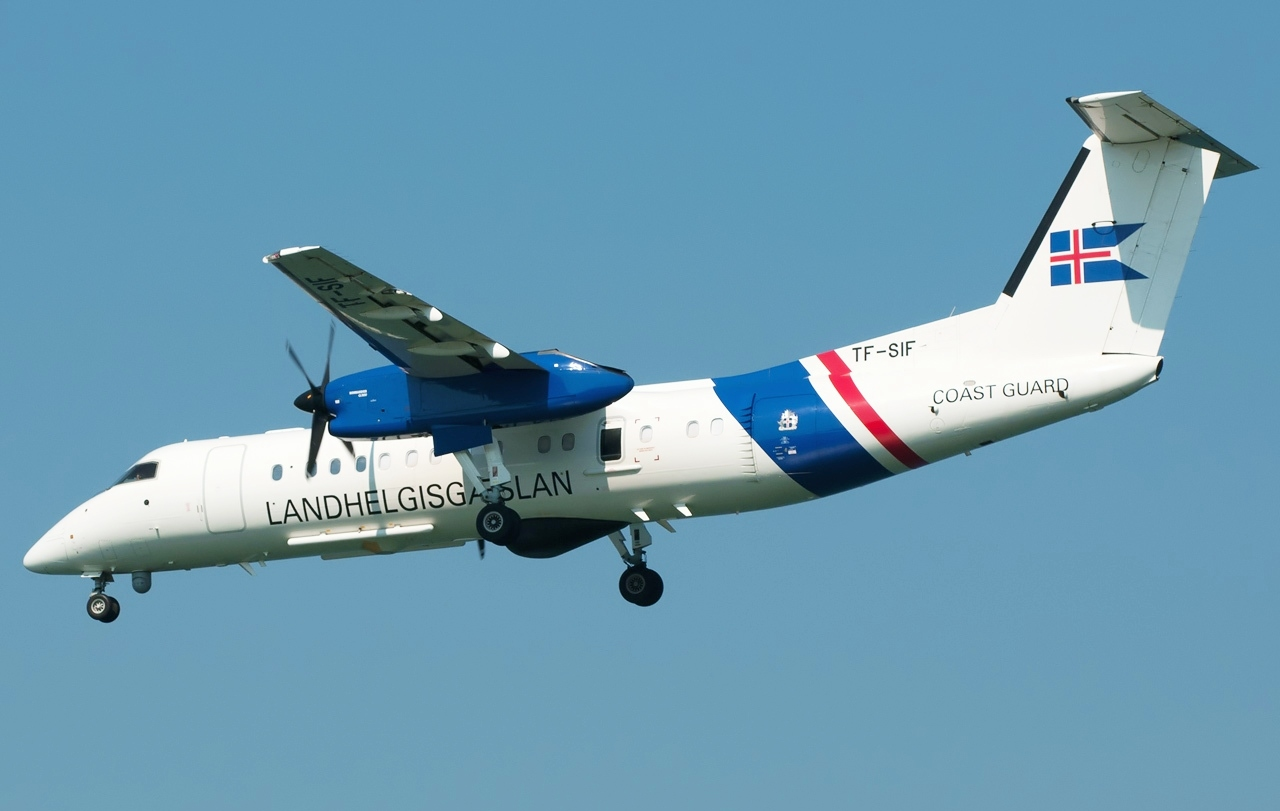
Sif (IV) is the latest maritime surveillance plane in the ICG service

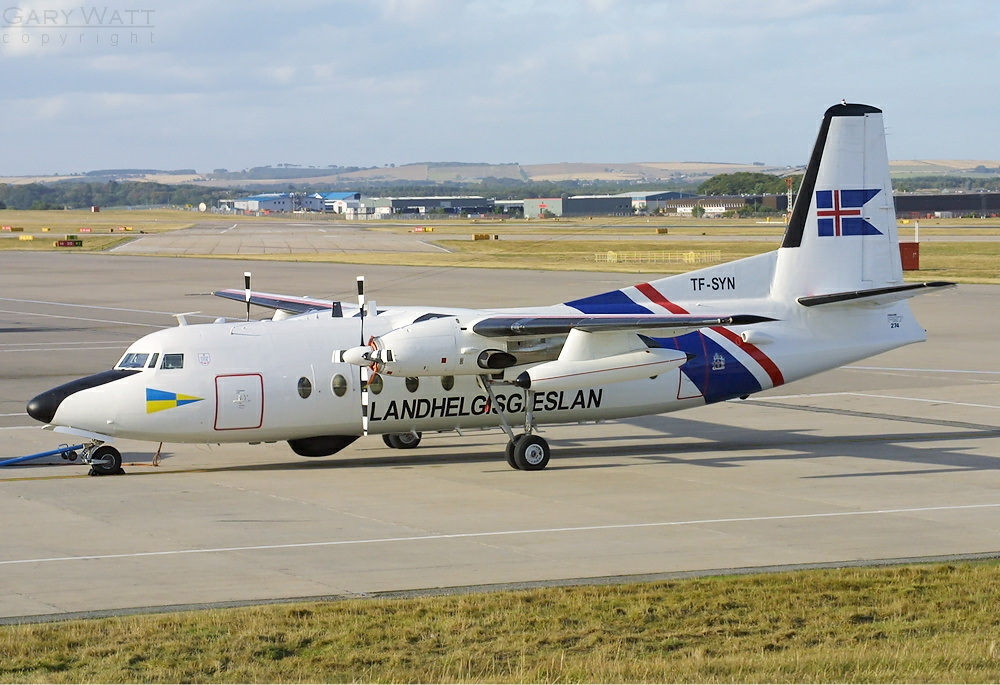
Syn (I) was the longest serving aircraft in ICG history, having served for 33 years.

Name (Note: All ICG aircraft bear names that originate from Norse mythology. According to the ICG, its aircraft should be referenced by either their given name or their identification letters (IDL) when covered in the media.)	IDL (Note: The identification letters (IDL) are always five and serve as both the international identification of the aircraft and telecommunication call sign. All identification letters start with TF, which is Iceland's electronic communications call sign, which was assigned to it approx. 100 years ago.)	Type	From	To
Rán (I)	TF-RAN	Consolidated PBY-6A Catalina	1955	1966
Built in 1945 and bought by the Icelandic Civil Aviation Administration from the U.S. Navy in September 1954 after it had been damaged close to Þórshöfn in Langanes earlier in the year. Bought by the ICG on 10 December 1955 and named after Rán, the goddess and a personification of the sea. In regular use until 1963 and was the first Icelandic aircraft to be equipped with a radar. Damaged beyond repair after flipping over during a major storm while parked and sold for scrap in 1966.
Sif (I)	TF-SIF	Douglas C-54 Skymaster	1962	1971
Bought used from a Portuguese airline in 1962 to replace Rán (I) and named after Sif, the golden-haired goddess associated with earth and the wife of Þór, the god of thunder.
Sýr (I)	TF-SYR	Fokker F27 Friendship 200	1972	1980
Bought used from All Nippon Airways to replace Sif (I) and named after one of the numerous names of Freyja, the goddess associated with love, beauty, fertility, sex, war, gold, and seiðr. Used for search and maritime surveillance and saw extensive use during the second and third Cod Wars. Sold to Flugleiðir in December 1980.
Syn (I)	TF-SYN	Fokker F27 Friendship 200	1976	2009
Syn was bought new in 1976 and used until 2009 for search and maritime surveillance. Named after Syn, the goddess associated with defensive refusal. As of 2021, Syn is preserved at the Icelandic Aviation Museum.
Sif (IV)	TF-SIF	Bombardier DHC-8-Q314	2009	Present
Ordered in May 2007 and arrived in July 2009. Used for maritime surveillance and replaced Syn (I). Due to budget cuts following the 2008 Icelandic financial collapse, Sif was frequently leased to Frontex to fly border control missions.

== Helicopter history ==
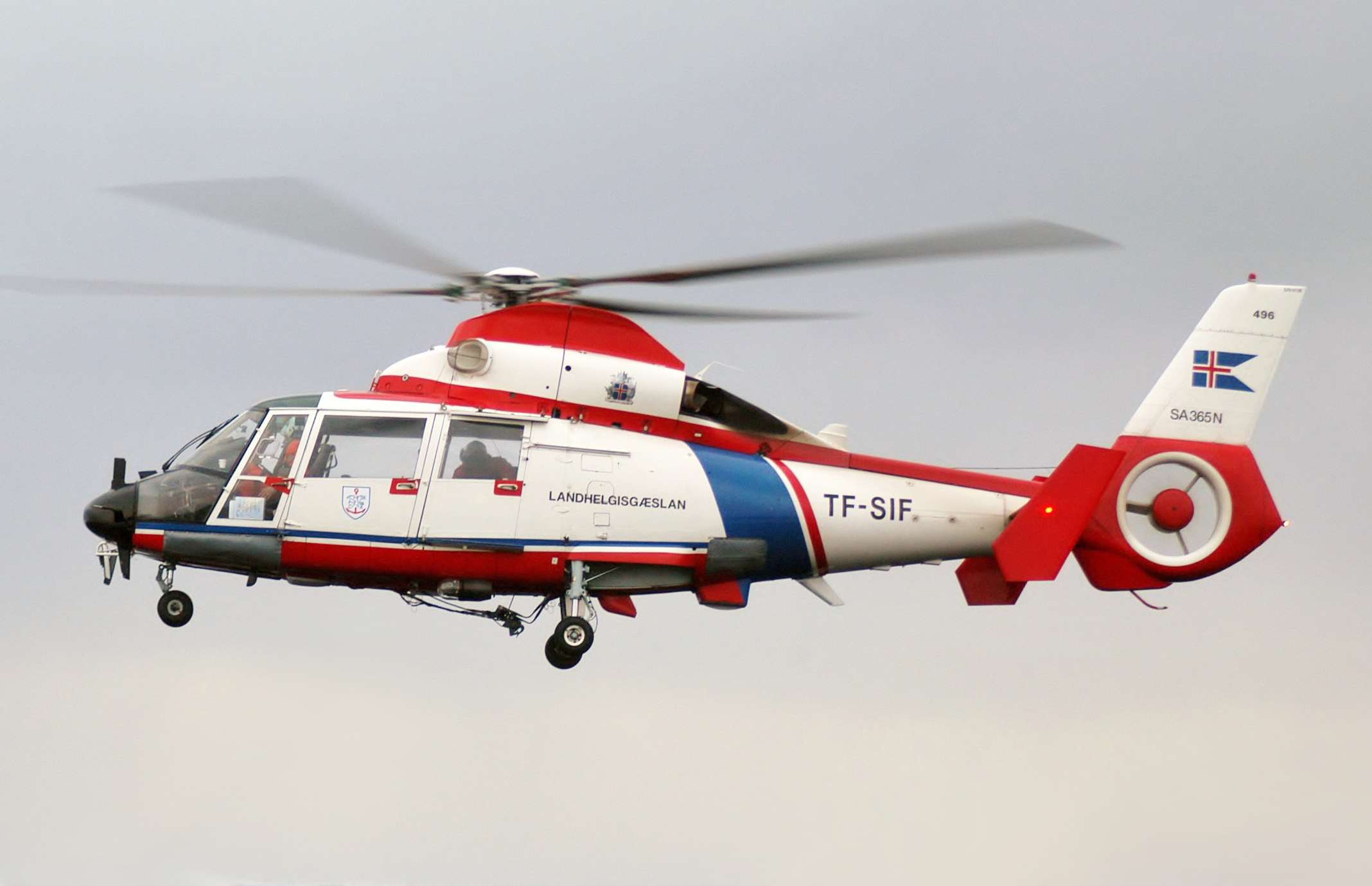
During her 22-year career, Sif (III) is credited to have been involved in the rescue of around 250 lives.

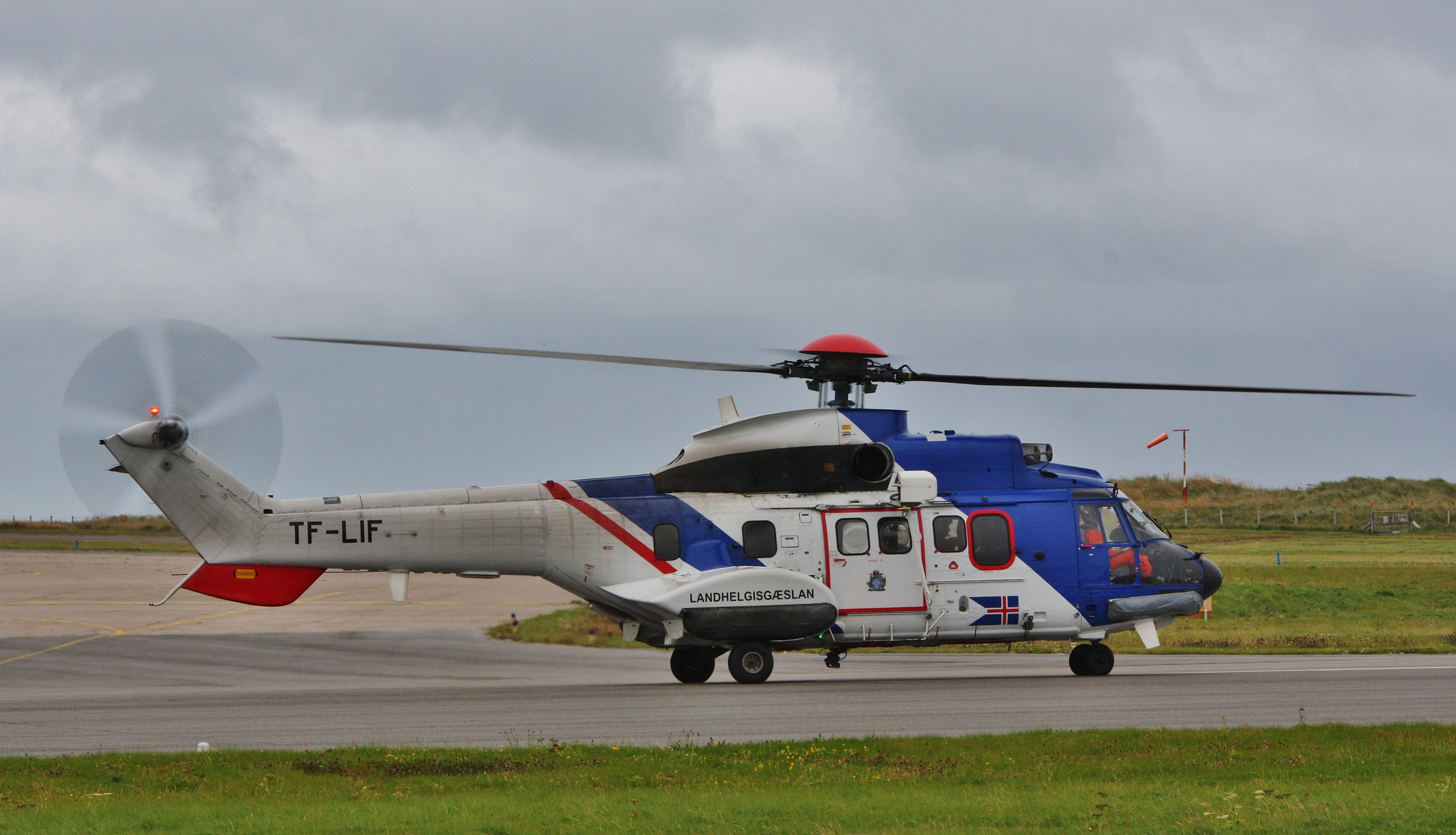
During a six-day period in 1997, Líf rescued 39 sailors in three separate incidents.

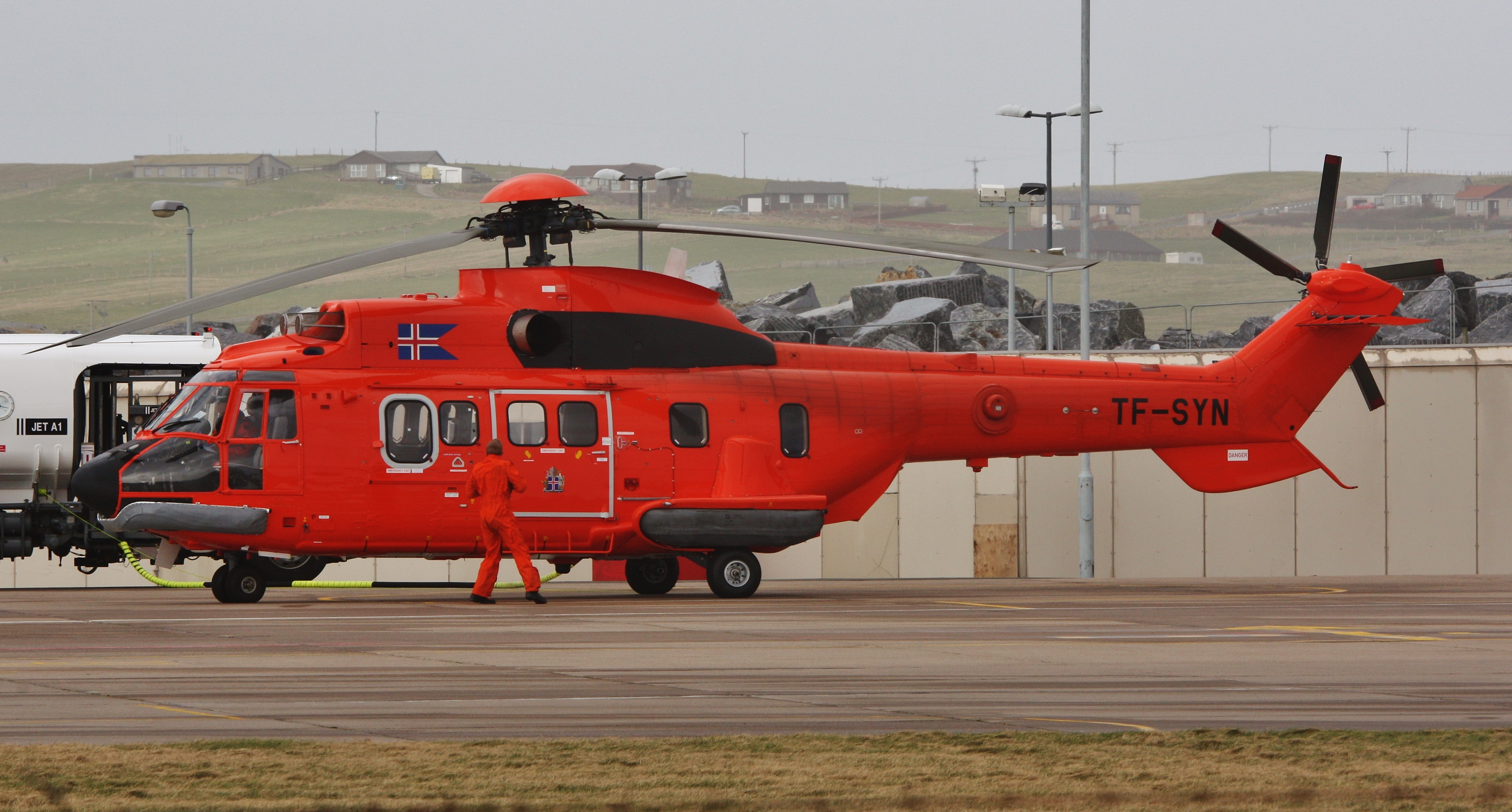
Syn (II) in the briefly used orange paint scheme.

Name	IDL	Type	From	To
Eir (I)	TF-EIR	Bell 47J	1965	1971
Was bought in 1965 and jointly owned by the ICG and the National Life-saving Association of Iceland, which provided half of the funds needed. Named after the Norse mythology goddess Eir. Crashed in October 1971.
Gná (I)	TF-GNA	Sikorsky S-62	1972	1975
The first specialized search and rescue helicopter operated by the ICG. Bought used from the United States Coast Guard in partnership with the National Life-saving Association of Iceland and named after the Norse mythology goddess Gná. Crashed in Skálafell in 1975 after a shaft in the tail propeller broke.
Huginn	TF-HUG	Bell 47G	1973	1980
Bought used from the Icelandic Defence Force and named after Huginn, one of Óðinn's ravens. Suffered from frequent breakdowns. Damaged after a hard landing on ICGV Ægir in 1975. Out of service by 1978 and sold around 1980.
Muninn	TF-MUN	Bell 47G	1973	1980
Bought used from the Icelandic Defence Force and named after Muninn, one of Óðinn's ravens. Suffered from frequent breakdowns. Out of service by 1978 and sold around 1980.
Gróa (I)	TF-GRO	Hughes 500C Defender	1976	1980
Named after the völva (seeress) Gróa. On 17 November 1980 it collided with a power line at Búrfell power plant, crashing 50 meters from the plant's mess hall.
Rán (II)	TF-RAN	Sikorsky S-76 Spirit	1980	1983
Arrived new in 1980 and was the second Coast Guard aircraft to bear the name Rán. Crashed in Jökulfirðir in November 1983, killing its four man crew, in what remains the deadliest accident in the ICG history and nearly caused the shutdown of its helicopter program.
Gróa (II)	TF-GRO	Hughes 500C Defender	1981	1986
Arrived in October 1981. Bought as a replacement for Gróa (I). In August 1985, its engine was damaged after a drunken man broke in to the hangar where it was stored and tried to start it. Sold in 1986 to finance a replacement helicopter.
Sif (II)	TF-SIF	Aérospatiale SA 365N Dauphin II	1984	1985
Leased from Aérospatiale while waiting for the arrival of Sif (III) and operated from October 1984 to July 1985.
Sif (III)	TF-SIF	Aérospatiale SA 365N Dauphin II	1985	2007
Arrived new in 1985 and was involved in several high profile rescue missions during its 22-year career. In 1987, it rescued the crew of Barðinn GK after it ran aground in the cliffs in the western part of Snæfellsnes. In 2007, Sif was damaged beyond repair after an emergency sea landing and was later donated to the Icelandic Aviation Museum.
Gróa (III)	TF-GRO	Eurocopter AS 350B Ecureuil	1986	1999
Bought in January 1986 and arrived in April the same year.
Líf	TF-LIF	Aérospatiale AS-332L1 Super Puma	1995	2020
Named after Líf from Norse mythology. Used for maritime surveillance and search and rescue operations. Is the longest serving helicopter in the history of the ICG and gained national fame when it rescued 39 sailors in three separate incidents during a six-day period in March 1997. Decommissioned ind 2020, put in storage and scheduled for sale. Donated to the Icelandic Aviation Museum in 2024 and put on display.
Steinríkur	LN-OBX	Aérospatiale AS-332C Super Puma	2006	2008
Leased in January 2006 and named Steinríkur after the Icelandic name of the character Obelix from the French comic book series Asterix. Leased again from 2007 to 2008.
Eir (II)	TF-EIR	Aérospatiale SA 365N Dauphin II	2007	2010
Leased in January 2007 from CHC Helikopter Service to replace Sif (III). Suffered from frequent breakdowns and was returned in 2010.
Gná (II)	TF-GNA	Aérospatiale AS-332L1 Super Puma	2007	2019
Leased from 2007 until early 2019. In April 2014, Gná suffered a serious gearbox failure when it was about 20 nautical miles from land and was immediately flown ashore where it made an emergency landing in a field near the town of Kvísker in Öræfi. In October 2013, Gná rescued 11 sailors from the burning cargo ship Fernanda. On 16 October 2014, Gná returned to Reykjavík after maintenance in Norway, having been repainted in the Coast Guard's orange livery also worn by Syn (II). In November 2018, TF-GNA rescued 15 sailors from the stranded cargo ship Fjordvik in Helguvík.
Syn (II)	TF-SYN	Aérospatiale AS-332L1 Super Puma	2012	2019
First leased for 12-months and arrived in February 2012. Replaced in 2019 by Gróa (IV). Received an orange paint scheme in March 2014, with Gná (II) following in October.
Eir (III)	TF-EIR	Eurocopter EC225 Super Puma	2019	Present
On long-term lease from Knut Axel Ugland Holding of Norway. Arrived in March 2019 and replaced Gná (II). In May 2020, TF-EIR made an emergency landing in Sandskeið following a failure in the gearbox. In March 2021, the helicopter rescued a BBC film crew after their boat started taking on water in the vicinity of Hlöðuvík in Hornstrandir.
Gróa (IV)	TF-GRO	Eurocopter EC225 Super Puma	2019	Present
Arrived in July 2019 on long-term lease from Knut Axel Ugland Holding of Norway and replaced Syn. During the November 2020 Coast Guards mechanics strike crisis, Gróa was the only operational rescue helicopter in the country.
Gná (III)	TF-GNA	Eurocopter EC225 Super Puma	2021	Present
On long-term lease from Knut Axel Ugland Holding of Norway. Arrived in May 2021. In 2024, it appeared in the fourth season of True Detective.
