= Sauda-class mine countermeasures vessel =

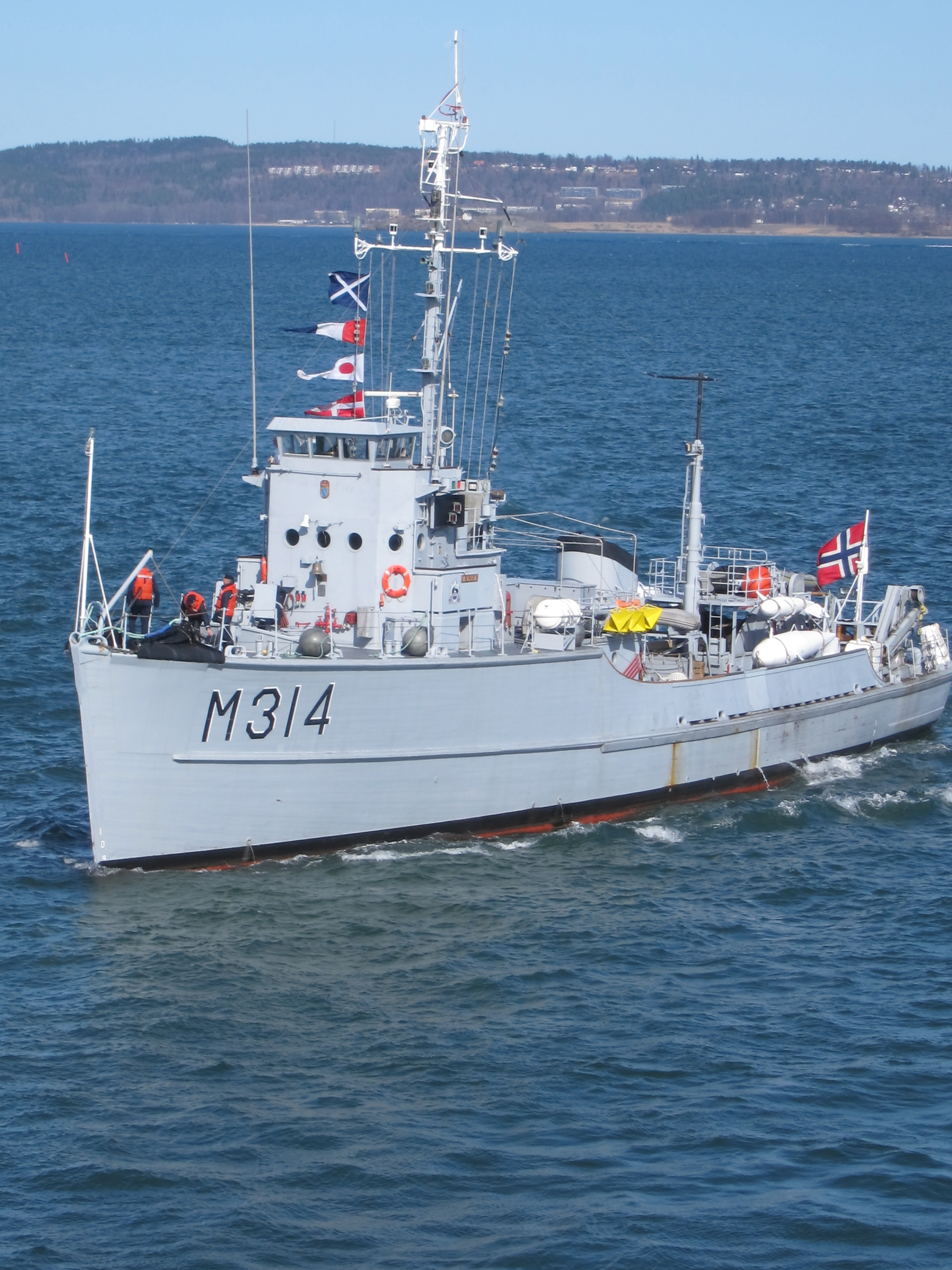
- The Sauda-class vessel Alta

Class overview
- Name: Sauda class
- Builders: Hodgdon Bros, Gowdy & Stevens, East Boothbay, Maine; Westermoen Båtbyggeri og Mek Verksted, Mandal; Skaalurens Skibsbyggeri, Rosendal; De Forenede Båtbyggerier, Risør
- Operators: Royal Norwegian Navy
- Preceded by: No preceding class, only HNoMS Rauma and HNoMS Otra
- Succeeded by: Oksøy-class mine hunter and Alta-class minesweeper
- Built: 1953-1955
- In commission: 1953-1996
- Completed: 10
- Retired: 10
- Preserved: 1

General characteristics
- Class & type: Adjutant-class minesweeper
- Displacement: 333 long tons (338 t)
- Length: 44 m (144 ft 4 in)
- Propulsion: 2 × General Motors 880 BHK
- Speed: 13.5 knots (25.0 km/h; 15.5 mph)
- Complement: 40 (8 - 10 officers and 30 men)
- Armament: 2 × Oerlikon 20 mm guns

The Sauda class was a class of nine minesweepers and one minehunter in service for the Royal Norwegian Navy from 1953 to 1996. The class was designed at Sparkman & Stephens Inc., New York City, as an improvement of the NYMS class (Norwegian Yard Mine Sweepers). Five of the vessels were built in the United States, three were built at Westermoen Båtbyggeri og Mek Verksted in Mandal, one at Skaalurens Skibsbyggeri in Rosendal and one at De Forenede Båtbyggerier in Risør. The class was fully financed by the US government as a part of the Military Assistance Program (MAP).

Most of the vessels were named after Norwegian rivers:Sira, Tana, Alta, Ogna, Vosso, Glomma, Tista, Kvina and Utla. Sauda is however, both a river and a town. Alta is the only vessel still in existence. She is a museum vessel owned by the Royal Norwegian Navy Museum but maintained and sailed by a dedicated friendship association. Some of the vessels were in service in the United States Navy and the Royal Belgian Navy before entering Norwegian service.

== Ships ==
- Sauda (M 311) was laid down as AMS-102 by the Hodgdon Brothers, Goudy and Stevens, East Boothbay, Maine, and completed on 23 July 1953. She was transferred to Norway on 25 August 1953. She was reclassified by U.S. Navy as Coastal Minesweeper MSC-102 on 7 February 1955. Sauda was decommissioned by the Norwegian Navy on 8 May 1981 and laid up. In 1987 the vessel was sold into civilian service.
- Ogna was built by Westermoen Båtbyggeri og Mek Verksted, Mandal, delivered on 5 March 1955, and decommissioned on 27 April 1979. She was sold into civilian service in 1987.
- Vosso was built by Skaalurens Skibsbyggeri, Rosendal, delivered on 15 March 1955, and decommissioned on 8 July 1987. She was sold for scrapping in August 1992.
- Tista was built by De Forenede båtbyggerier, Risør, delivered on 27 April 1955, and decommissioned on 15 August 1994. She was sold for scrapping in 1997.
- Kvina (M 332) was built by Westermoen Båtbyggeri og Mek Verksted, Mandal, delivered on 12 July 1955, and decommissioned on 24 March 1995. She was sold for scrapping in 1997.
- Utla was built by Westermoen Båtbyggeri og Mek Verksted, Mandal, delivered on 15 November 1955, and decommissioned on 17 January 1990. She was sold for scrapping in 1997.
- Sira was laid down as AMS-132 by the Hiltebrant Drydock Company of Kingston, New York, and reclassified by the U.S. Navy as Coastal Minesweeper MSC-132 on 7 February 1955. Completed on 14 November 1955 she was transferred to Norway on 28 November 1955. Sira was decommissioned on 23 May 1986 and laid up. She was sold for scrapping in August 1992.
- Tana (M 313) was laid down as AMS-103 by the Hodgdon Brothers, Goudy and Stevens, East Boothbay, Maine, completed 22 September 1953 and transferred to Belgium as Roeselaere (M 914). Reclassified by U.S. Navy as Coastal Minesweeper MSC-103 on 7 February 1955, she was returned to U.S. custody in 1966 and then transferred to Norway. Tana was extensively refitted at the Båtservice AS shipyards at Mandal between August 1976 and September 1977, and subsequently reclassified as a minehunter. She was decommissioned on 24 October 1994 and put into reserve. The vessel was sold for scrapping in 1997.
- Alta (M 314) was laid down as AMS-104 by the Hodgdon Brothers, Goudy and Stevens, East Boothbay, Maine, completed on 30 October 1953 and transferred to Belgium as Arlon (M 915). Reclassified by the U.S. Navy as Coastal Minesweeper MSC-104 on 7 February 1955, she was returned to U.S. custody in 1966 and then transferred to Norway. Alta was decommissioned on 23 May 1996 and (ownership) was transferred to the Royal Norwegian Navy Museum. To be operated, she was turned over to the Alta Society (Fartoylaget KNM Alta). The ship is still sailing and based in Oslo.
- Glomma (M 317) was laid down as AMS-151 by the Hodgdon Brothers, Goudy and Stevens, East Boothbay, Maine, completed on 15 December 1953 and transferred to Belgium as Bastogne (M 313). Reclassified by the U.S. Navy as Coastal Minesweeper MSC-151 on 7 February 1955, she was returned to U.S. custody in 1966 and then transferred to Norway. Glomma was decommissioned on 24 September 1986 and laid up until August 1992 when it was sold for scrapping.
