= MV Frigg =

Tanker built in 1982 and named after Frigg; Norse Goddess of Wisdom

History
- Name: Frigg
- Operator: Nesskip
- Builder: Skaalurens Skibsbyggeri of Rosendal, Norway
- Launched: 6 May 1982
- Completed: 1982
- Identification: IMO number: 8015881; MMSI number: 273337240; Callsign: UHGD
- Status: Active

General characteristics
- Type: Single Decker
- Tonnage: 2,580 t DWT
- Length: 80.88 metres (265.4 ft)
- Beam: 13.1 metres (43 ft)
- Height: 7.37 metres (24.2 ft)
- Draught: 5.18 metres (17.0 ft)
- Decks: 1
- Speed: 13.5 kn

Frigg is a chemical tanker operated by Nesskip of Iceland. It is named after the Norse Goddess of Wisdom, Frigg. It was built in 1982 by Norwegian firm Skaalurens Skibsbyggeri A/S in Rosendal, and measures 80.88 metres (265.4 ft) by 13.1 metres (43 ft), with a deadweight of 2580 tonnes. In August 2001 the tanker was acquired by Icelandic shipping firm Nesskip along with MV Freyja (now known as MV Millennial Spirit).
