= TF-SIF =

TF-SIF may refer to:

- TF-SIF (Dauphin 2), a helicopter operated by the Icelandic Coast Guard from 1985 until 2007
- TF-SIF (Dash 8), an aircraft operated by the Icelandic Coast Guard since 2009
