= TF-RÁN =

Icelandic Coast Guard helicopter

Rán

General information
- Other name: TF-RÁN
- Type: Sikorsky S-76A
- Manufacturer: Sikorsky
- Owners: Icelandic Coast Guard
- Construction number: 760081
- Registration: TF-RAN

History
- In service: 1980–1983

Rán, also known as TF-RÁN, was a Sikorsky S-76A helicopter that was in service with the Icelandic Coast Guard from 1980 to 1983. It was named after Rán, the goddess and a personification of the sea from Norse mythology, and was the second Coast Guard aircraft to bear the name. Its 1983 crash in the sea in Jökulfirðir remains the deadliest accident in the ICG history and nearly caused the shutdown of its helicopter program.

== History ==
Rán was bought in 1980 for 1.6 million dollars and was delivered in September the same year. It arrived to Reykjavík onboard the ICGV Ægir on 1 October. It was the second specialized rescue helicopter in the history of the Icelandic Coast Guard, after the Sikorsky S-62 named Gná. Rán's first rescue mission was on 18 November 1980, when it transported an ill lighthouse keeper from Hornstrandir to hospital in stormy weather conditions.

On 2 March 1983, the crew of Rán, along with the crew of a French Aérospatiale SA 330 Puma, one of two temporarily deployed in the country, rescued 11 people from the trawler Hafrún ÍS-400 after it ran aground at Stigahlíð in the Westfjords. The rescue was captured on film by Morgunblaðið photographer Ragnar Axelsson who was allowed to travel with the helicopters after the mayday was received.

In July 1983, Rán was used to transport the prime minister of Iceland, Steingrímur Hermannsson, and the vice President of the United States, George Bush, while the latter was on an official visit in Iceland.

On 31 October 1983, the crew of Rán rescued three survivors from the fishing vessel Haförn SH 22 after it sank in Breiðafjörður.

On 8 November 1983, at 22:53, Rán took off from the ICGV Óðinn, which was stationed close to Höfðaströnd in Jökulfirðir, for a training flight. Three minutes later, a vague call was heard from the helicopter, and at the same time, crew members aboard Óðinn witnessed a flash in the distance. An extensive search began immediately by Óðinn and fishing boats in the area, as well from airplanes sent by the Civil Aviation Administration and the Icelandic Defense Force. At around 2 o'clock at night, the liner Orri found a wreck from the helicopter, which turned out to be parts of the helicopter's paddles, lifebelt and helmet. The wreckage was found shortly before noon on 10 November at a depth of 82 meters, about half a mile nautical north of Höfðaströnd in Jökulfjörður. From the 14th to the 15th of November, work was done to pull the wreckage to the surface of the motorboat Siggi Sveins. When it reached a depth of about 20 meters, a diving team started working on it and they found the bodies of two crew members in the helicopter, pilot Þórhallur Karlsson and flight engineer Bjarni Jóhannesson. The bodies of the other two men, captain Björn Jónsson and Sigurjón Ingi Sigurjónsson were not on board the helicopter. The body of Sigurjón was found on 31 January 1989 when it came into the nets of shrimp boat Óli ÍS, the same boat found the missing cabin door of the helicopter in 1985. The Icelandic Air Accident Committee, which was supported by a representative from the National Transportation Safety Board, concluded in its report that due to a design flaws in the sliders of the cabin door, it separated from the helicopter in flight and was deflected upwards into the main rotor, causing the crash.

The crash and the loss of most of the ICG's most experienced aviation crewmembers, including its most senior member, captain Björn Jónsson, nearly caused the shutdown of its helicopter program. After some deliberation, the decision was made in 1984 to continue the program and buy a new Aérospatiale SA 365N Dauphin II and rent another until the new one would arrive. With the arrival of Rán´s replacement, Sif, in 1985, several changes were made to the helicopter program, including to training, expanding crew rosters, addition of helicopter doctors and shift plans to expand its availability.

== Notable captains ==
- Benóný Ásgrímsson

== See also ==
- List of aircraft of the Icelandic Coast Guard
