= 1986 Eagle Air Piper PA-23 crash =

1986 aviation accident involved a PA-23

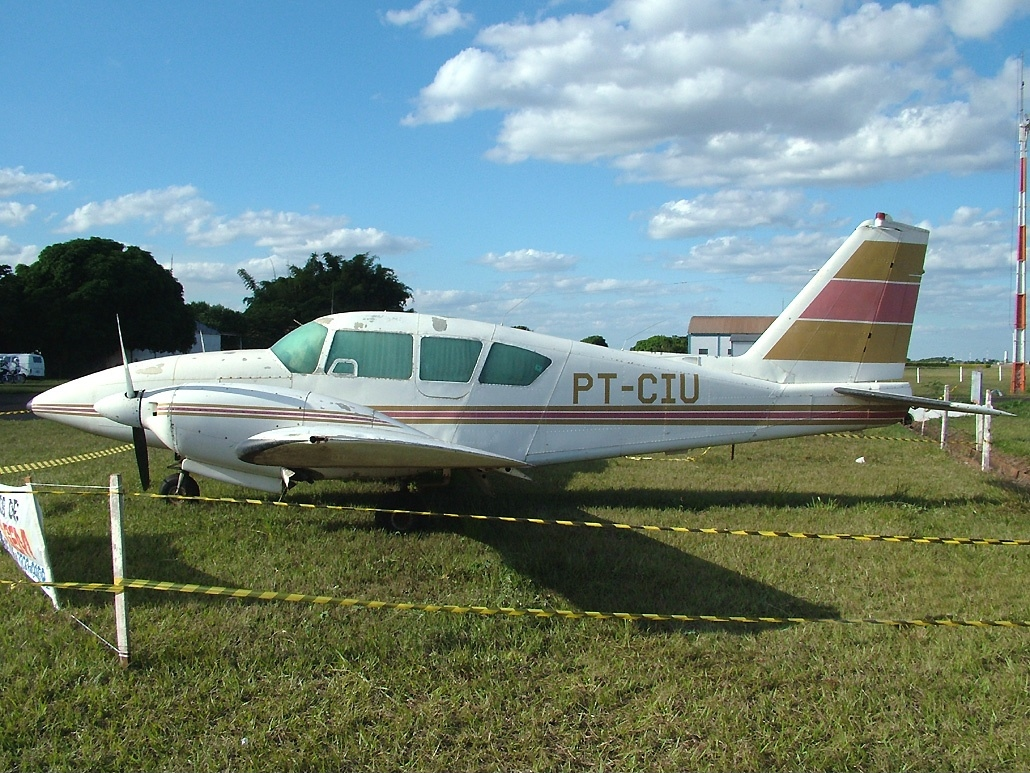
- A Piper PA-23-250 Aztec, similar to the aircraft involved

Accident
- Date: 5 April 1986
- Summary: Downdraft during landing
- Site: Ljósufjöll, Iceland; 64.927°N 22.570°W

Aircraft
- Aircraft type: Piper PA-23-250 Aztec
- Registration: TF-ORM
- Flight origin: Ísafjörður Airport, Iceland
- Destination: Reykjavík Airport, Iceland
- Occupants: 7
- Passengers: 6
- Crew: 1
- Fatalities: 5
- Injuries: 2

On 5 April 1986, at 13:26, an Eagle Air Piper PA-23-250 Aztec light aircraft crashed in Ljósufjöll in Snæfellsnes, Iceland killing five of the occupants on board. The aircraft was on a charter flight from Ísafjörður to Reykjavík and carried six passengers, including a couple with an 11-month-old child, and a pilot. It was believed that the plane landed in a downdraft and crashed into the slopes of Ljósufjöll, south of Sóleyjardalur. It remains one of the deadliest aviation accidents in Iceland's history and resulted in changes to aviation regulations and procedures to increase the flow of up-to-date weather information to pilots.

The wreckage of the plane was found on the northern slopes of Ljósufjöll, at an altitude of 700 metres (2,300 ft), just before midnight the same day. Men from the Air Rescue Squad in Reykjavík were the first to arrive at the scene of the accident and there were three passengers alive in the wreckage, but one passenger died in a snowmobile on the way down the mountain.

== Investigation ==
=== Final Report ===
An investigation by the Air Accident Committee and the Civil Aviation Administration concluded that the plane likely landed in a downdraft resulting in it crashing into the slopes of Ljósufjöll. It also concluded that a large part of the cause was due to the pilots lack of access to current weather information in the area.

=== Recommendations ===
The accident and investigation resulted in changes on aviation regulations and procedures to increase the flow of up-to-date weather information between pilots and the Icelandic Meteorological Office. It also led to an overhaul of how air operators' logbooks, brochures and other educational material published by the Civil Aviation Administration are used in pilot training and retraining, e.g. in pilots aptitude test.

== Aftermath ==
Three days after the crash, a survivor who lost his wife and child in the crash, told his story in an interview with Morgunblaðið. The interview caused a considerable backlash towards the newspaper and doctors at Borgarspítalinn.

The aftermath of the accident also caused a controversy in Iceland due to the governments regulations regarding passenger compensations for plane accidents which was 47-times lower than passengers in an automobile accident could receive.

== In popular culture ==
In 2020, RÚV featured the accident in a three-part radio series.

In 2011, the accident was featured in the book Útkall - Ofviðri í Ljósufjöllum, part of the Útkall book series by Óttar Sveinsson. In 2022, the story from the book was featured in the sixth episode of the docuseries Útkall on the television channel Hringbraut.
