= MV Millennial Spirit =

Moldovan chemical tanker

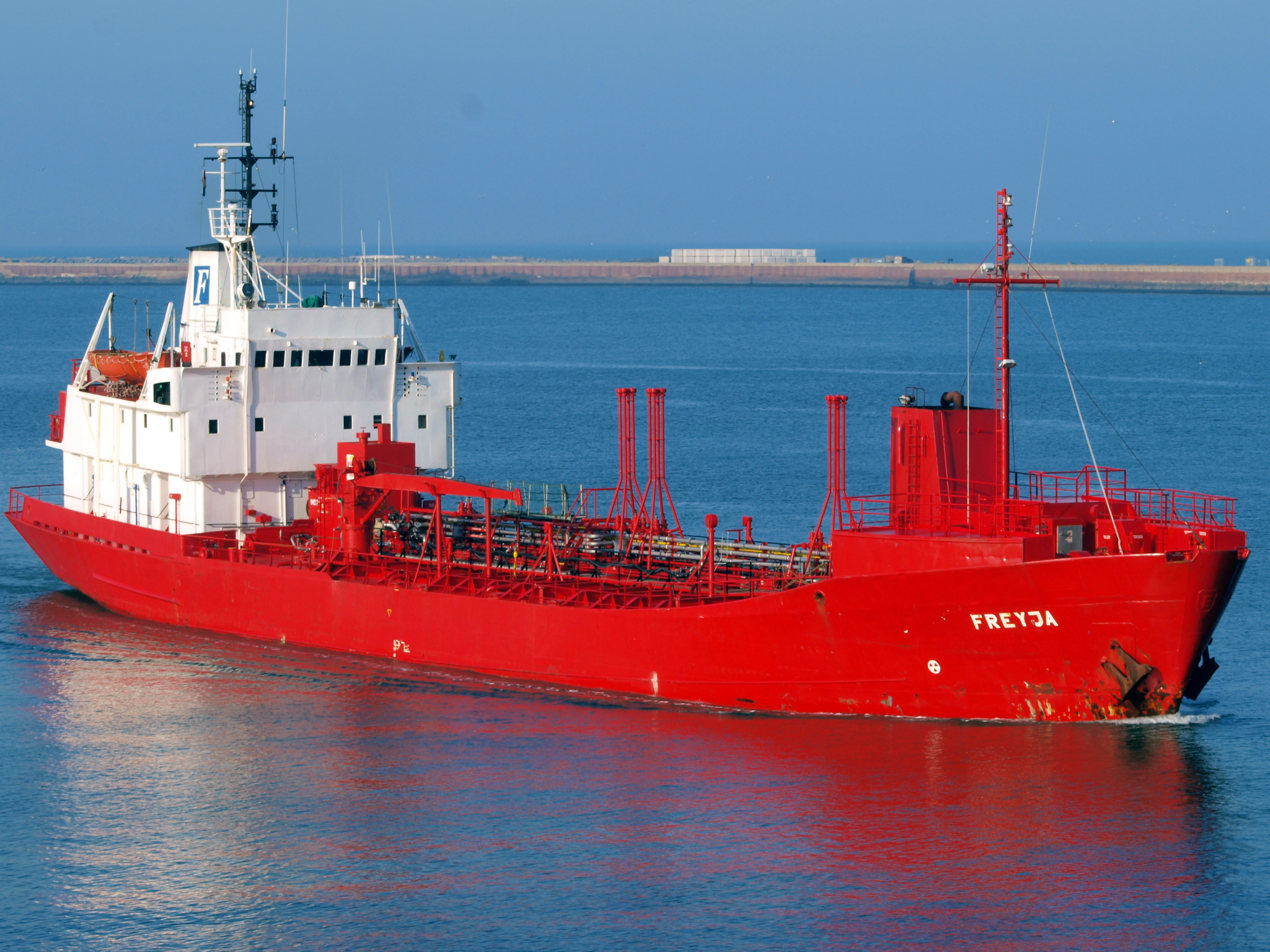
- Millennial Spirit under previous name Freyja

History
- Name: Millennial Spirit
- Port of registry: Moldova
- Launched: 22 June 1974
- Completed: 1974
- Identification: IMO number: 7392610; MMSI number: 248384000; Callsign: 9HCD6
- Fate: Shelled by a Russian warship on 25 February 2022
- Notes: Formerly Freyja

General characteristics
- Class & type: Oil tanker
- Tonnage: 2,200 DWT
- Length: 77.12 m (253 ft 0 in)
- Beam: 12.53 m (41 ft 1 in)
- Draught: 4.6 m (15 ft 1 in)
- Speed: 13.5 knots (25.0 km/h; 15.5 mph)
- Crew: 10 or 12

MV Millennial Spirit is a Moldovan chemical tanker which transports diesel fuel. Built in 1974, the ship was previously known as MV Freyja under the ownership of an Icelandic shipping firm. It was shelled and its crew was forced to abandon ship in the Black Sea during the 2022 Russian invasion of Ukraine. According to Ukrainian officials, the ship was shelled by Russian warships.

== Characteristics ==
The Millennial Spirit is a 2,200-ton chemical tanker which is 77.12 m (253 ft 0 in) long, has a beam of 12.53 m (41 ft 1 in), and a draught of 4.6 m (15 ft 1 in). It was assessed at 1,665 gross tonnage (GT) and 2,200 tons deadweight (DWT). It has a single deck and a crew of either 10 or 12.

== History ==
=== Building ===
The ship was constructed in Lauenburg, West Germany, by builder J.G. Hitzler Schiffswerft und Maschinenfabrik. It was completed on 22 June 1974 under its first recorded name Essberger Pilot with an original port of registry at Limassol, Cyprus. Over the following years, the ship would change names several times, including Solvent Explorer, Tom Lima, and Hordafor Pilot.

=== As Freyja ===
In August 2001 the tanker was acquired by Icelandic shipping firm Nesskip along with MV Frigg, another chemical tanker. It was renamed to MV Freyja and was operated by Nesskip until 2015, registered in Valletta, Malta.

=== Shelling ===
On 25 February 2022, the Millennial Spirit was carrying 600 tons of diesel fuel while transiting through the Black Sea. According to a Ukrainian ministry, the tanker was shelled while underway 22 km (12 nmi) south of the Ukrainian port of Yuzhne by Russian warships involved in the 2022 Russian invasion of Ukraine. The ship's crew were stated to be Russian by Moldova's naval agency; two were injured and all were forced to abandon ship in lifejackets. All of the crew were rescued by Ukrainian authorities and those injured were sent to a hospital.

Early reports indicated that the vessel was sailing under the Romanian flag, a country which is in NATO, prompting concerns about an attack on a NATO member. However, these reports turned out to be false and Moldova's naval agency confirmed that the Millennial Spirit was Moldovan.

The oiler was still on the surface and afire as of 16 March 2022. Because of this, The Drive has suggested that when the Ukrainian authorities reported days earlier on 7 March that the Russian patrol boat Vasily Bykov had been damaged by a missile attack by Ukraine, they confused it with the Millennial Spirit, as new pictures and footage of the ship intact in Sevastopol appeared on 16 March.

== See also ==
- List of ship losses during the Russo-Ukrainian War
