= Benoný =

Benoný is an Icelandic name and might refer to:

- Benóný Ásgrímsson, Icelandic aviator
- Benoný Breki Andrésson, Icelandic footballer
