= Benóný Ásgrímsson =

Icelandic aviator

- Born: 30 September 1951 (age 75); Reykjavík, Iceland
- Spouse: Kristín Ingibjörg Gunnarsdóttir
- Children: 3
- Military career
- Allegiance: Iceland
- Branch: Icelandic Coast Guard
- Service years: 1966–2016
- Rank: Captain

Benóný Ásgrímsson is an Icelandic aviator. He served with the Icelandic Coast Guard for 50 years, including 38 years as a helicopter pilot from 1978 to 2016 where he participated in several high-profile rescue operations.

== Coast guard career ==
He started his career with the Coast Guard at the age of 14 on board the ICGV Ægir but later moved to its helicopter division. In 1986, he participated in the rescue of two survivors of the Ljósufjöll air crash onboard TF-SIF. In 1997, he was the captained TF-LÍF when its crew rescued 29 sailors in two incidents over a four-day period. On 5 March, 19 sailors from the cargo ship MV Vikartindur were rescued aboard TF-LÍF after the ship suffered engine failure and ran aground on the south coast of Iceland, east of Þjórsá. One crewmember from ICGV Ægir washed overboard during the rescue operations and drowned. On 9 March, he again piloted TF-LÍF as its crew rescued 10 out of 12 crewmembers from the cargo ship Dísarfell after in sank 100 nautical miles (190 km; 120 mi) south east of Hornafjörður.

He officially retired from the Coast Guard on his 65th birthday on 30 September 2016.
