= Óttar Sveinsson =

Icelandic author and former journalist

Óttar Halldór Sveinsson
- Born: 14 October 1958 (age 66)
- Occupation: Author
- Language: Icelandic
- Years active: 1995–present
- Notable works: Útkall series

Óttar Halldór Sveinsson (born 14 October 1958) is an Icelandic author and former journalist. He is best known for his book series Útkall where he documents search and rescue missions in Iceland. His first book, Útkall Alfa TF-SIF, about several rescue missions involving the Icelandic Coast Guard helicopter Sif (TF-SIF), came out in 1995. As of 2022, he has written 29 books.
