= Dimmelsvik =

Village in Kvinnherad Municipality, Norway

- Village
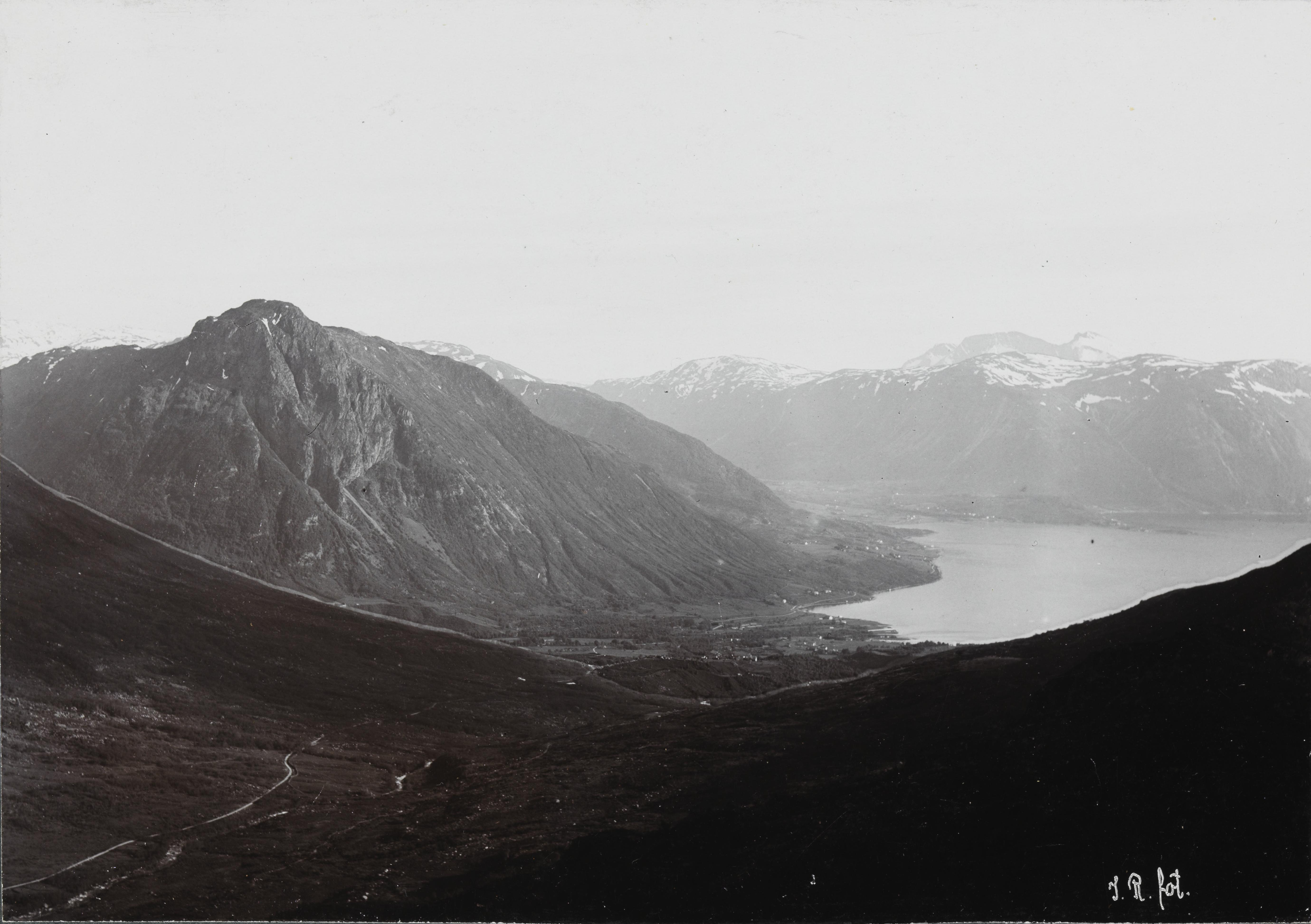
- View of the village
- Interactive map of Dimmelsvik
- Coordinates: 59.95259°N 5.97674°E
- Country: Norway
- Region: Western Norway
- County: Vestland
- District: Sunnhordland
- Municipality: Kvinnherad Municipality

Area
  - Total: 0.47 km^{2} (0.18 sq mi)
- Elevation: 41 m (135 ft)

Population (2025)
  - Total: 474
  - Density: 1,009/km^{2} (2,610/sq mi)
- Time zone: UTC+01:00 (CET)
  - Summer (DST): UTC+02:00 (CEST)
- Post Code: 5464 Dimmelsvik

Dimmelsvik is a village in Kvinnherad Municipality in Vestland county, Norway. The village is located on the south shore of the Hardangerfjorden, about 4 kilometres (2.5 mi) south of the municipal centre of Rosendal and about 7 kilometres (4.3 mi) northeast of the village of Uskedalen.

The 0.47-square-kilometre (120-acre) village has a population (2025) of 474 and a population density of 1,009 inhabitants per square kilometre (2,610/sq mi).

The village is an old trading post going back for hundreds of years. It was the administrative centre of Kvinnherad Municipality until just after World War II, when the administration was moved to the nearby village of Rosendal. The village has a barrel factory and a clog factory. NorStone also has a gravel and sand pit in the Dimmelsvik area. The company is a large supplier of gravel, sand, and crushed stone.
