= Murder of Birna Brjánsdóttir =

Murder in January 2017 in Iceland

Birna Brjánsdóttir
- Born: 28 November 1996
- Disappeared: Breiðholt, Iceland
- Died: 14 January 2017 (aged 20)
- Cause of death: Drowning
- Body discovered: 22 January 2017, Reykjanes Peninsula, Iceland
- Resting place: Reykjavik Cemetery, Reykjavík, Iceland; 64.12409°N 21.91053°W (approximate)
- Known for: Murder victim

Birna Brjánsdóttir (1996–2017) was an Icelandic woman who disappeared at the age of 20 on the morning of 14 January 2017 after leaving a club in central Reykjavík. She was found dead on 22 January 2017 after an extensive search operation, with her body having been dropped into the ocean. A Greenlandic fisherman, Thomas Møller Olsen, was found guilty of her murder and received a 19-year prison sentence for that crime in addition to narcotics smuggling.

== Disappearance ==
Birna Brjánsdóttir lived with her father in the Reykjavík district of Breiðholt. On Friday night, 13 January 2017, she went out with friends to Húrra, a club in the city centre; she left alone three hours after them, at about 5.00 the following morning. Surveillance video showed her walking along Laugavegur, the main shopping street, and eating a falafel pita; until a red Kia Rio stopped in front of Number 31. After her friend and co-worker at Hagkaup called her parents and it became apparent she had not returned home or contacted them, first her mother and then the police appealed for help finding her; the search over the next week was the largest manhunt in Iceland, 800 people volunteering. Her mobile phone was traced to Hafnarfjörður, and her Doc Martens boots were found near the harbour there.

== Discovery of the body and murder investigation ==
The car, which was traced after also being seen on surveillance video at Hafnafjörður harbour, had been rented by a crew member of the Greenlandic trawler Polar Nanoq; with the assistance of the captain, members of the Special Unit of the National Police Commissioner were transported to the ship by the Icelandic Coast Guard helicopter TF-LÍF and arrested two of the crew on suspicion of her murder. Birna's blood was found in the car, and her driving licence was found on the ship. On 22 January her body was found washed up near the Selvogsviti lighthouse on the coast of the Reykjanes peninsula, more than 40 km (26 miles) away from where she disappeared. She was naked and the autopsy established her cause of death as drowning, but bruising also indicated she had been strangled and hit in the face. There was no evidence she had been sexually assaulted.

== Trial, appeal, and sentencing ==
Thomas Møller Olsen, the Polar Nanoq crew member who had rented the car and who was then 25, was charged with the murder of Birna Brjánsdóttir on 30 March and in September was found guilty in the Reykjanes District Court. By the start of the trial, his DNA had been identified on the laces of one of Birna's boots and his fingerprints on the driving licence; film had also been found of him buying cleaning products and cleaning the interior of the car. His shipmate who had been arrested at the same time, Nikolaj Olsen, was a witness against him, having been seen on surveillance video leaving the car in a very drunk state and returning to the ship several hours before Møller Olsen, who in court sought to portray him as the murderer. After appeal, Møller Olsen's conviction was affirmed by the High Court in November 2018, and his sentence of 19 years in prison for the murder and for drug smuggling, in addition to an assessment of 29 million krónur ($243,356) in costs and compensation, went into force. 23 kg (51 lb) of hashish had been found in his cabin.

The High Court declined a request for a further appeal in February 2019. In October 2019, Olsen was transferred to Denmark to serve his sentence there.

== Reactions ==
Murder is rare in Iceland, and women had felt safe asking for and accepting rides from strangers; Birna's disappearance and the news that she had been murdered caused widespread shock. Crime writer Yrsa Sigurðardóttir said: "In the past we have only witnessed murders like this in works of fiction." "Ég er Birna" (I am Birna) trended on social media. Some news outlets broke with tradition and published the suspects' names and photographs. After the discovery of her body, people lit candles and held vigils for her in both Iceland and Greenland, and a memorial in Reykjavík the following weekend had 8,000 participants. 2,000 people, including the president and prime minister, attended her funeral at Hallgrímskirkja. The number of surveillance cameras in Reykjavík increased, and a women-only version of the informal Facebook-based ride service Skutlarar was established. After the discovery of her body, Polar Nanoq donated 1.6 million krónur ($14,976) to those who had searched for her, and in March 2018, a wreath from the crew was laid on her grave to commemorate the first anniversary of her death.

== See also ==
- List of solved missing person cases (post-2000)
