= Sif Saga =

Icelandic model (born 1997)

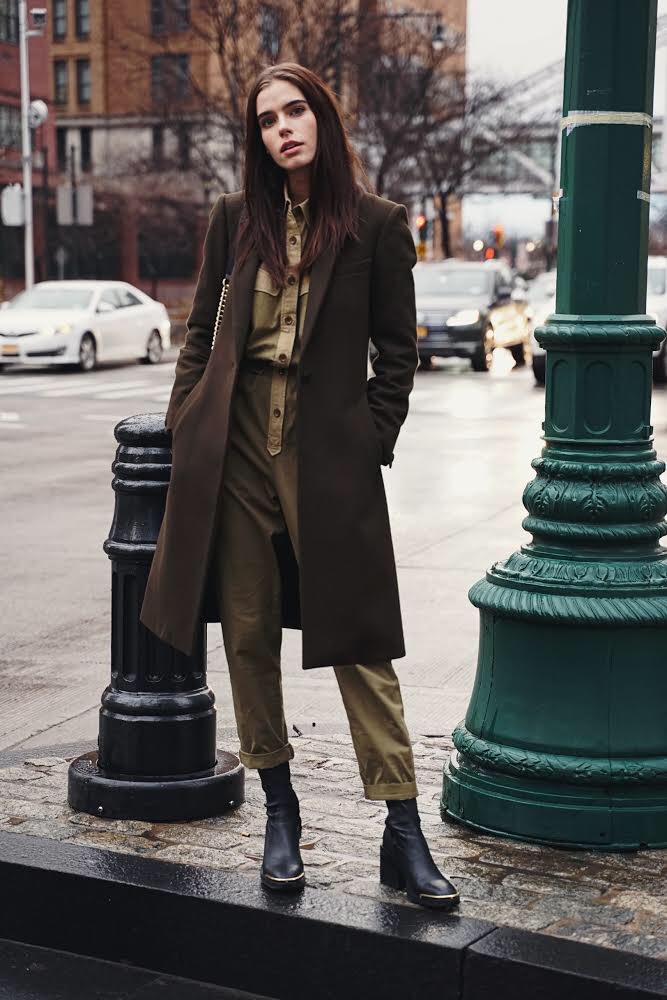
- Sif Saga in 2020
- Born: Sif Saga Dagbjartsdóttir; 20 September 1997 (age 28); Boston, United States
- Education: Brewster Academy
- Occupations: Model, actress and song writer

Sif Saga (born 20 September 1997) is an Icelandic model, actress and songwriter.

== Early life ==
Sif Saga Dagbjartsdóttir was born and raised in Boston to Icelandic parents. She started singing at a tender age getting involved with choirs and any events that has to do with music. Her love for fashion began at the age of 12, when she studied at Brewster Academy in Wolfeboro, New Hampshire, she then decided to finish her high school in New York City to graduate early and start her career.

== Career ==
After living in Miami and Paris for her modelling career, Saga moved to Los Angeles in 2016, where she got her first Elle cover in Argentina. She got influenced in doing music from the songwriters and musicians whom she knew. In 2018, Saga then moved to New York where she prepared for a film called Feral State. She later signed with Supreme Management in September 2019. Feral State was released in May 2021.

== Covers ==
- Elle Argentina 2016, 2017 and 2020
- Prestige Runway 2016
- Trend Prive 2018
- Harpers Bazaar Turkey 2018
- 708 Magazine 2019
- Elle Bulgaria 2018
- Numero Russia 2019

== Movies ==
- Feral State
