= TF-LÍF =

Icelandic Coast Guard helicopter

Líf
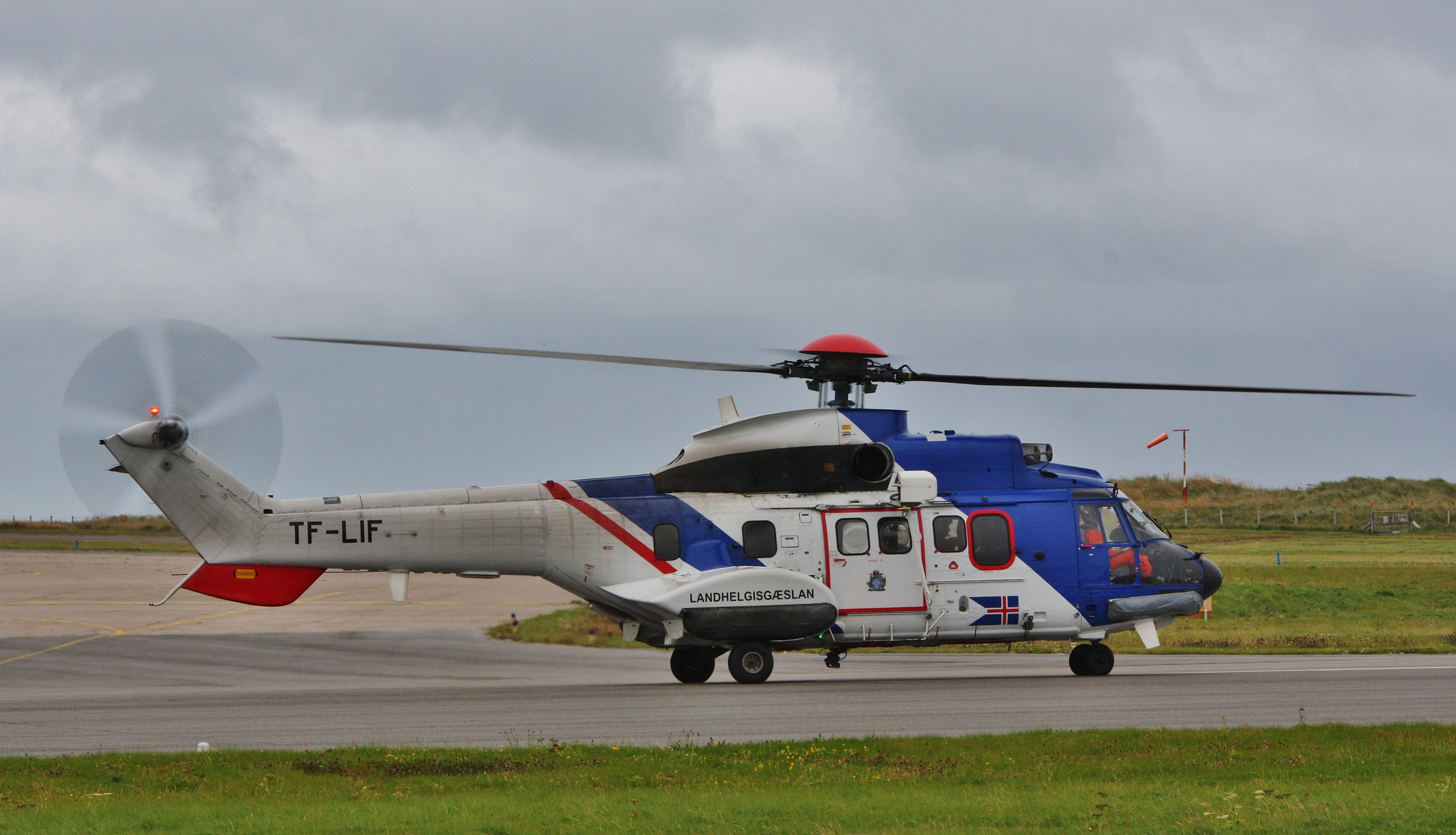
- Líf in August 2013.

General information
- Other name: TF-LÍF
- Type: Aérospatiale AS-332L1 Super Puma
- Manufacturer: Aérospatiale
- Status: On display
- Owners: Icelandic Coast Guard
- Construction number: 2210
- Registration: TF-LIF

History
- Manufactured: 1986
- In service: 1995-2020
- Preserved at: The Icelandic Aviation Museum

Líf, also known as TF-LÍF, is an Aérospatiale AS-332L1 Super Puma helicopter that served the Icelandic Coast Guard for 25-years. It is named after Líf, the only woman foretold to survive the events of Ragnarök from Norse mythology, and is the first Coast Guard aircraft to bear the name. It is the longest serving helicopter in the history of the ICG and gained national fame when it rescued 39 sailors in three separate incidents during a six-day period in March 1997. In 2024, it was put on display at the Icelandic Aviation Museum.

== History ==
Líf was ordered in June 1994 and delivered 23 June 1995. Its formal arrival at Reykjavík Airport was greeted by the president of Iceland, Vigdís Finnbogadóttir.

In October 1995, Líf participated in the rescue operations after the 1995 Flateyri avalanche, transporting rescuers to the town and airlifting injured survivors out of it.

During a six-day period in 1997, Líf rescued 39 sailors in three separate incidents. On 5 March, 19 sailors from the cargo ship MV Vikartindur were rescued aboard Líf after it suffered engine failure and ran aground on the south coast of Iceland, east of Þjórsá. One crewmember from ICGV Ægir washed overboard during the rescue operations and drowned. On 9 March, the crew of Líf rescued 10 out of 12 crewmembers from the cargo ship Dísarfell after in sank 100 nautical miles (190 km; 120 mi) south east of Hornafjörður. The day after, 10 seamen from the fishing vessel Þorsteinn GK were saved aboard Líf after the ship lost engine power and drifted towards the rocky cliffs of Krísuvíkurberg.

On 9 March 2004, Líf rescued all 16 crewmembers of the trawler Baldvin Þorsteinsson EA-10 after it ran aground in Skarðsfjara on the south coast of Iceland.

On 19 December 2006, Líf rescued seven sailors from HDMS Triton after their rigid inflatable boat overturned in rough seas during the rescue operations of the stranding of the cargo ship Wilson Muuga. Its sister helicopter, Sif, meanwhile saved 12 crewmembers of the cargo ship.

On 20 January 2017, Líf transported members of the Special Unit of the National Police Commissioner to the Greenlandic trawler Polar Nanoq, 90 nautical miles (170 km; 100 mi) south west of Iceland, to arrest the suspect in the murder of Birna Brjánsdóttir.

In 2020, it was decided that Líf would be put up for sale. In May 2022, it was in storage at the Coast Guard hangar at Reykjavík Airport, having not been used since 2020. In June 2022, the Líf was transported to a hangar at Keflavík Airport in preparation of a sale. In September 2023, the Icelandic Aviation Museum expressed interest in receiving Líf for display, citing its historical significance. The buyer, EX-Change Parts AB, donated the hull to the Museum along with several spare parts to aid in its restoration. In March 2024, it was transported to Akureyri and put on display.

== Notable appearances in media ==
Líf was featured in the 2010 drama film Undercurrent along with the ICGV Týr.

== Notable captains ==
- Benóný Ásgrímsson
