= Sif Ríkharðsdóttir =

Icelandic academic

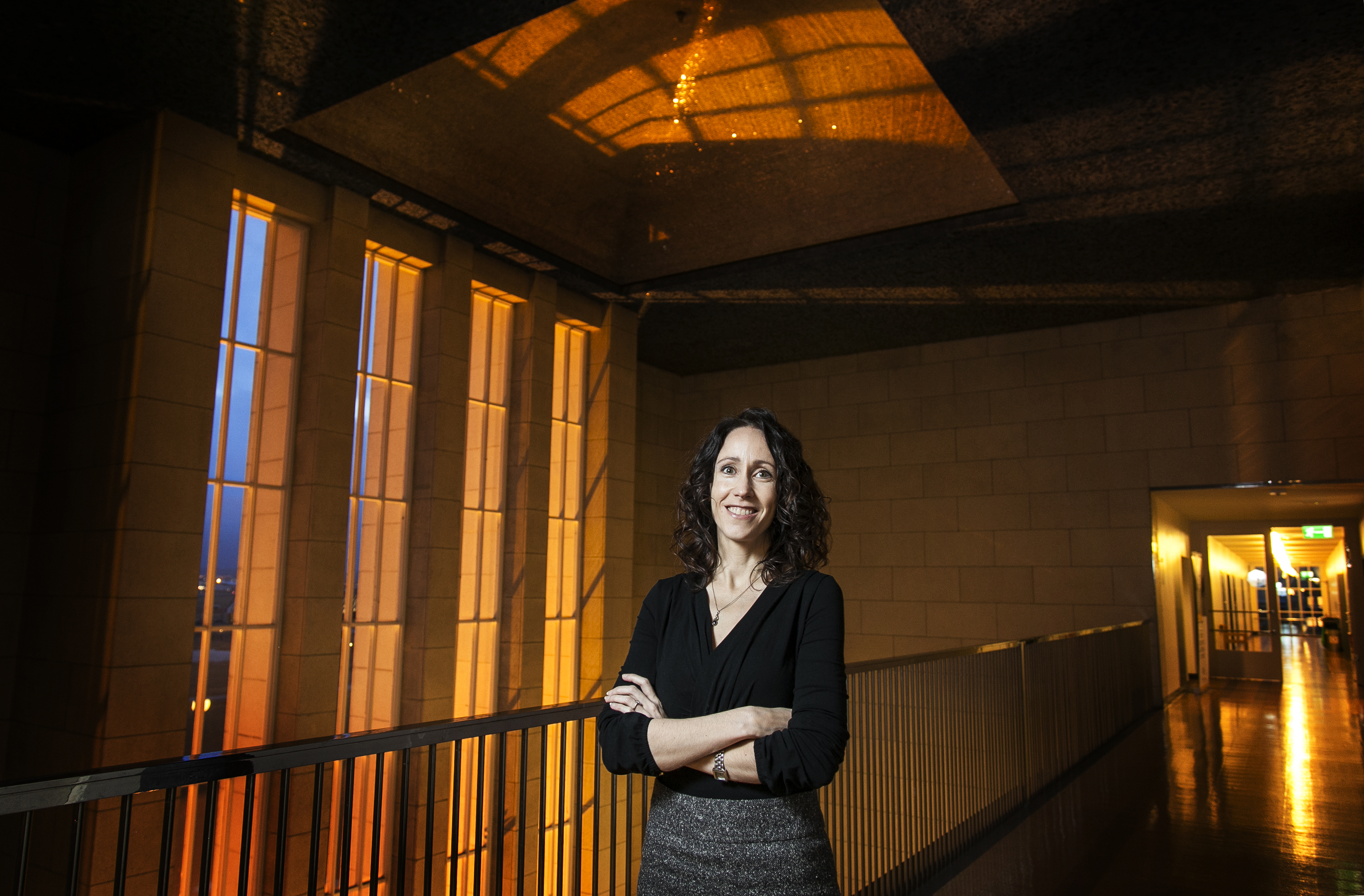
- Occupation: Professor
- Organization: University of Iceland

Sif Ríkharðsdóttir is a professor of Comparative Literature at the University of Iceland.

== Career ==
Sif Ríkharðsdóttir was appointed as assistant professor in Comparative Literature at the University of Iceland in 2012. Before that she was a visiting fellow at Clare Hall, University of Cambridge (2011). She has been Professor of Comparative Literature at the University of Iceland since 2017. Her research is mainly focused on European medieval literature, the history of emotion and emotion research, cultural studies and research on cultural transmission, translations and gender studies. Her books and articles have appeared in the UK, in Iceland, in the US and in Germany.

Sif has held multiple administrative appointments, including as the Chair of Comparative Literature at the University of Iceland, as Head of the Graduate Studies Committee, and as a board member of the Research Fund of the University of Iceland. She has chaired and set on several local and international expert panels for research funding agencies, including the Icelandic Research Fund, HERA (Humanities in the European Research Area), the Irish Research Council and the National Science Centre of Poland. She was the President of the Nordic Branch of the International Arthurian Society and has been actively involved in the Medieval Academy of America. She is the Series Editor of Studies in Old Norse Literature at Boydell & Brewer with Carolyne Larrington and sits on the editorial board of the series Philologica Classica e Medievale at L’Erma di Bretschneider in Rome in Italy.

Sif has received various honours and awards, including a Mellon Fellowship as well as Visiting Fellowships or Professorships at the University of Venice, University of Bristol, Clare Hall, University of Cambridge and she was the Northern Scholars Lecturer at the University of Edinburgh in 2016. She has been involved in multiple international research projects. including: „Emotion and the Medieval Self in Northern Europe“, led by Sif and funded by the Icelandic Research Fund (RANNÍS); and the project „Charlemagne: A European Icon“, led by Marianne Ailes and funded by the Leverhulme Trust in UK.

== Books ==
- Emotion in Old Norse Literature: Translations, Voices, Contexts. Studies in Old Norse Literature I (Cambridge: D. S. Brewer, 2017).
- Medieval Translations and Cultural Discourse: The Movement of Texts in England, France and Scandinavia. (Cambridge: D. S. Brewer, 2012).
- Arthur of the North: Histories, Emotions and Imaginations, Special Issue of Scandinavian Studies 87.1 (2015), edited by Bjørn Bandlien, Stefka G. Eriksen and Sif Rikhardsdottir (See excerpt on Project Muse).

== Articles and book chapters ==
- ‘Empire of Emotion: The Formation of Emotive Literary Identities and Mentalities in the North’, in Crossing Borders in the Insular Middle Ages, edited by Aisling Byrne and Victoria Flood, Medieval Texts and Cultures of Northern Europe 30, Turnhaut: Brepols, 2019, 189–210.
- ‘The Phantom of Romance: Traces of Romance Transmission and the Question of Originality’, in Medieval Romance Across European Borders, edited by Miriam Muth, Medieval Narratives in Transmission 1, Turnhaut: Brepols, 2018, 133–51.
- 'Chronology, Anachronism and Translatio Imperii', in Handbook of Arthurian Romance: King Arthur's Court in Medieval European Literature, edited by Johnny McFadyen and Leah Tether, Berlin: De Gruyter, 2017, 135–49.
- Medieval Emotionality: The Feeling Subject in Medieval Literature, Comparative Literature 69:1 (2017).
- ‘Medieval Emotionality: The Feeling Subject in Medieval Literature’, Comparative Literature 69.1 (2017), 74–90.
- ‘Translating Emotion: Vocalisation and Embodiment in Yvain and Ívens saga’, Emotions in Medieval Arthurian Literature: Body, Mind, Voice, edited by Frank Brandsma, Carolyne Larrington and Corinne Saunders, Cambridge: D. S. Brewer, 2015, 161–79.
- ‘The Gawain Poet’, in Oxford Handbooks Online, ed. James Simpson, Oxford: Oxford University Press, October 2014.
- Sif Rikhardsdottir and Stefka G. Eriksen, ‘État présent: Arthurian Literature in the North’, Journal of the International Arthurian Society 1.1 (2013), 3-28.
- ‘Hugræn fræði, tilfinningar og miðaldir’ [Cognitive Studies, Emotions and the Middle Ages]. Ritið 3 (2012), 67–89. Special Issue on Cognitive Studies, edited by Þórhallur Eyþórsson and Bergljót Kristjánsdóttir.
- ‘Meykóngahefðin í riddarasögum. Hugmyndafræðileg átök um kynhlutverk og þjóðfélagsstöð’ [The Maiden King Tradition in Icelandic Romance. Ideological Conflict regarding Gender Roles and Social Positioning]. Skírnir 184 (haust 2010), 410–33.
- ‘The Imperial Implications of Medieval Translations. A Comparative Analysis of the Old Norse and Middle English Versions of Marie de France´s Lais’, Studies in Philology 105.2 (2008), 144–64.
- ‘Bound by Culture. A Comparative Study of the Old French and Old Norse Versions of La Chanson de Roland’, Mediaevalia 26.2 (2005), 243–64. Special Issue: Translation in the Middle Ages and Renaissance: The Survival of Culture, edited by Marilyn Gaddis Rose.
