= Central European Institute of Philosophy =

Philosophical society

- Director: Karel Novotný; Hans Rainer Sepp
- Address: Prague, Czech Republic
- Website: sif-praha.cz/

The Central European Institute of Philosophy (SIF; Czech: Středoevropský Institut Filosofie; German: Mitteleuropäisches Institut für Philosophie) established in 2010, is a joint institution of the Charles University Faculty of Humanities and the Czech Republic Academy of Sciences’ Institute of Philosophy. The SIF seeks to follow in the footsteps of Prague’s “Cercle philosophique,” which was established by Czech and German professors from the University of Prague in 1934, but soon disbanded with the German occupation of Czechoslovakia. The Institute promotes philosophical research – with an emphasis on the phenomenological as well as on trans/ interdisciplinary.

The Czech Republic, with its tradition of a rather unusual symbiotic alliance of Czech, Jewish, and German intellectuals is an ideal location for the SIF. The country has given birth to various influential movements: The Prague Circle literary school (Franz Kafka, Max Brod, Felix Weltsch, Franz Werfel, Oscar Baum), in art Czech cubism and surrealism along with other disciplines such as empirical criticism (Ernst Mach), phenomenology (Edmund Husserl), and psychoanalysis (Sigmund Freud). As one of its primary objectives, the SIF seeks to map the rich potential of the varied cultural and ethnic influences that shape the present day Czech state. This mapping enables a hypothesis as to the reciprocal influences of not only other European traditions but also non-European and the consequences these might hold for the present and the future.

In keeping with this multi-cultural tradition, two directors guide the SIF: a Czech, Karel Novotny and a German, Hans Rainer Sepp. The Institute is composed of a staff of permanent and external members and is also supported by an international scholarly board of 36 professors or institutions representing twenty countries. All strive in close association so that SIF may bring together thinkers and scholars working in a wide range of disciplines concerned with the study of philosophical, historical, critical, and theoretical issues. In addition, SIF also is the home of the book series “Orbis Phaenomenologicus,” founded in 1993 and published first by Verlag Karl Alber (vol.s 1–8, 1993–2001) and from 2002 by Königshausen & Neumann, Würzburg, Germany, as well as the newly established series “libri nigri. Thinking Across Boundaries” and “libri virides. The Young Forum,” published by Traugott Bautz, Nordhausen, Germany.

A research project entitled “Philosophical Investigations of Body Experiences: Trans-disciplinary Perspectives” is currently underway at the SIF. In addition to its ongoing research projects, the SIF offers specialized advanced courses in conjunction with the EU Master Program “German and French Philosophy in the European Context.” The Institute also organizes and hosts international conferences and is very active in facilitating the publication of established and young scholars alike. To date the SIF has organized three international conferences and edited ten book publications.
