= Skaalurens Skibsbyggeri =

Shipyard in Rosendal, Norway

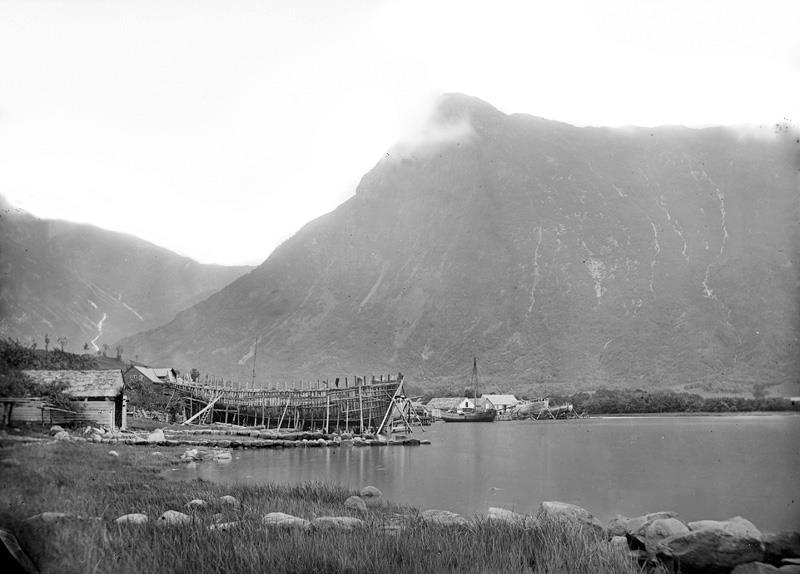
Skaalurens Skibsbyggeri in the 1870s

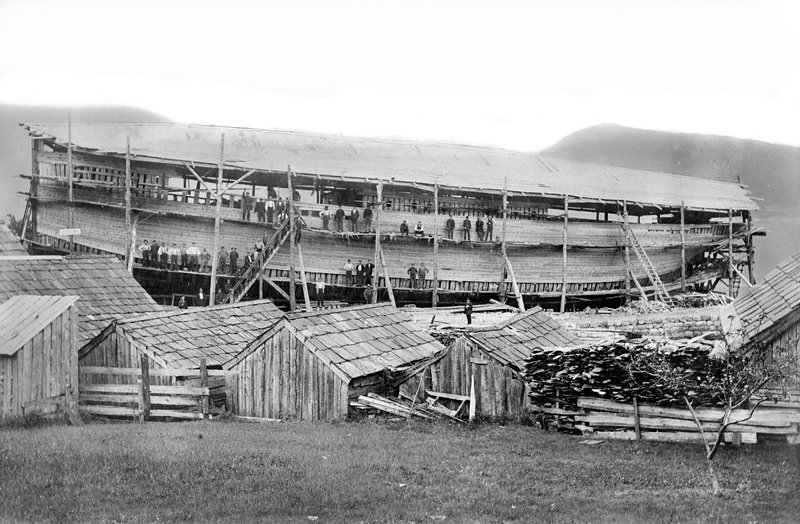
Skaalurens Skibsbyggeri in 1901

Skaaluren Skibsbyggeri A/S was a shipyard in Rosendal, Norway. One of Norway's prominent shipbuilders, it was founded in 1855. The yard was founded by Tørris Knudsen Nes (later Tørris Skaaluren) who built the first sloop. Through four generations it built boats of wood, and in 1955 it began building ships with steel hulls, in compliance with and under the supervision of the Norwegian Ministry of Marine. It later became known for its building of chemical tankers, such as MV Frigg in 1982.

Skaalurensamlinga is currently a museum where one can see how the old ships were made and the tools used.
