= MV Vikartindur =

Coordinates: 63°43.9′N 20°52.4′W

MV Vikartindur was a German-registered 8,633 ton container ship that became stranded on a beach on the south coast of Iceland on March 5, 1997, while en route from Tórshavn, the capital of the Faroe Islands, to Reykjavík.

She suffered engine failure at 1200 in stormy conditions and, although able to restart her main engine, she was not able to generate enough power to prevent the gale force winds from blowing her towards shore. Her anchor took hold 1.7 miles off the coast but its chain broke at 1900 and attempts by the ICGV Ægir of the Icelandic Coast Guard to attach a towing line were unsuccessful in the heavy seas. The Vikartindur ran aground at 2100 at 63 degrees 43.9 minutes north, 20 degrees 52.4 minutes west at 2100 and the crew of 19 were rescued by a helicopter TF-LÍF of the Icelandic Coast Guard. Once stranded the ship lay at an angle of 40 degrees and soon broke her back, precluding any attempt to refloat her. The ship was carrying 2,900 tons of cargo in containers.

The Vikartindur was broken up in situ on the beach using her own cranes. The work was completed in August 1997, six months after she was wrecked. She had been built in Stettin in Poland for Peter Dohle Schiffahrts-KG of Germany in 1996, the year before she was lost, and was chartered to the transportation company Eimskip, Reykjavík. The incident includes the first and to date only death of Coast Guard worker resulting from a head injury from a fall when a big wave hit the deck and the body was then thrown overboard only to be found days later.
