= Hringbraut (TV station) =

Icelandic media company

Hringbraut (Icelandic pronunciation: [ˈriŋkˌprœyːt], lit. 'Ring Road') is a privately held Icelandic media company that operates an online newspaper, hringbraut.is. It previously operated a television station free to air, non-subscription, reaching 98% of all households in Iceland. Its programming was all in Icelandic, broadcasting 24/7 and in HD.

== About the media ==
The Icelandic television station Hringbraut (and the station's web) first aired in February 2015. Mr. Sigmundur Ernir Rúnarsson, Editor-in-chief of Hringbraut said that there was a space available on the Icelandic television market, since the station would be being different from what was before in the market. "We believe there is room for a broad and informative talk show Channel, backed up by a diverse website, open to all Iceland's potential, for the benefit of homes and businesses, with experienced staff at the helm."

When Hringbraut started, it sent out a press release explaining its policy and purpose:

"Hringbraut is a new, diverse and free television and web site that focuses on dynamic and informative discussion on national issues, culture, homes, health and lifestyle. In particular, the media is, meant to be a source of constructive dialogue on reforms of home and business, where tolerance and broad-mindedness should guide its writings and programming, along with objectivity and human respect."

== Broadcasting ==
Hringbraut was a free television that broadcast Icelandic television programs (mainly Talk shows) along with commercials. It was dependent on selling advertising time or acquiring sponsors for its programs. It ran 24 hours a day in Iceland, in HD quality and SD quality. On 31 March 2023, the company closed down the television station.
