= Sif, Yemen =

Sif
- Location in Yemen
- Coordinates: 15°18′48″N 48°19′51″E
- Country: Yemen
- Governorate: Hadhramaut
- Time zone: UTC+3 (Yemen Standard Time)

Sif, Yemen is a village in eastern Yemen. It is located in the Hadhramaut Governorate.
