= Nesskip =

Icelandic shipping company

Nesskip hf.
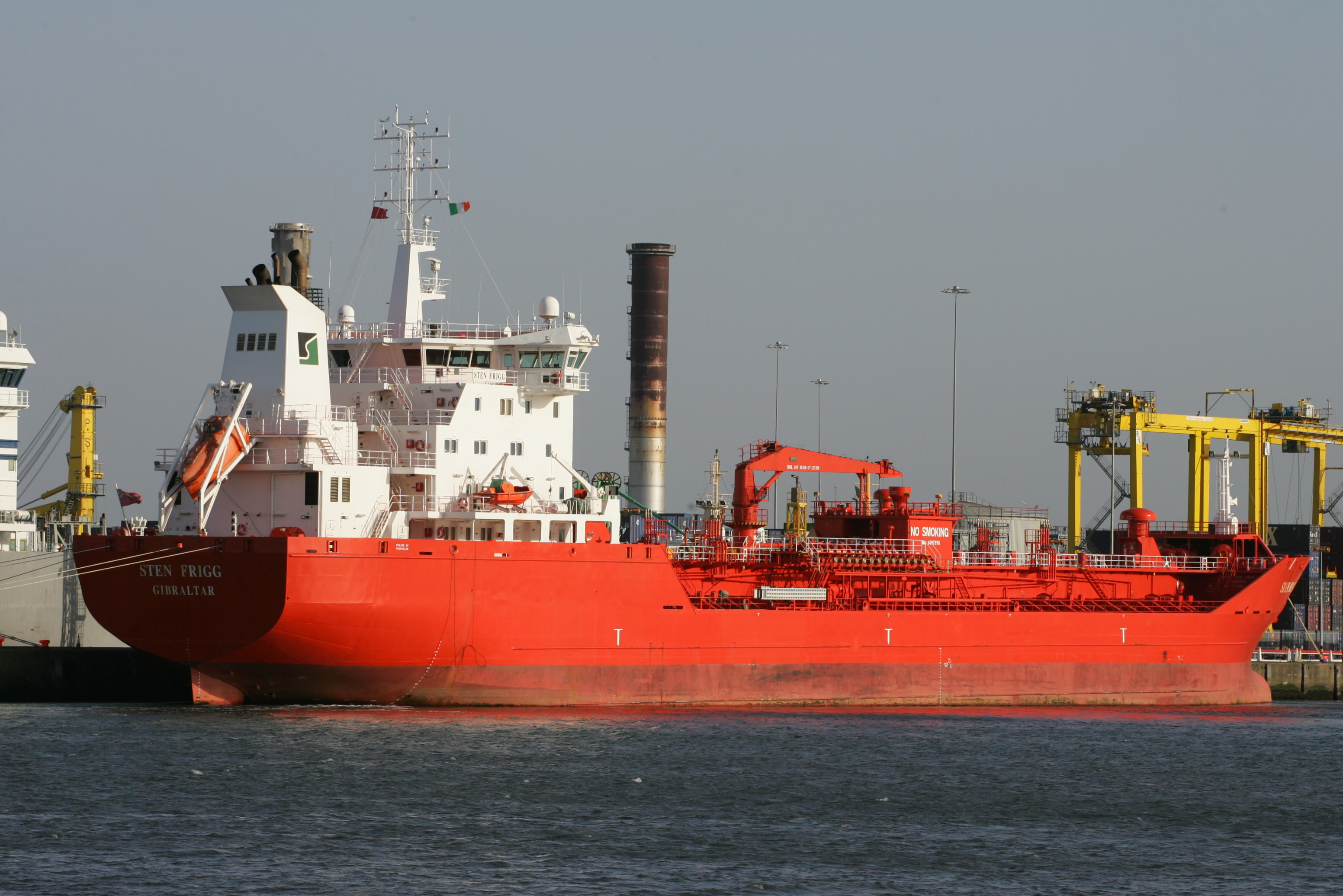
- Nesskip's chemical tanker MV Frigg
- Industry: Transport
- Founded: 1974; 52 years ago
- Headquarters: Reykjavík, Iceland,
- Key people: Garðar Jóhannsson (Manager)
- Products: Shipping; Freight distribution Others
- Number of employees: 8 (2018)
- Parent: Wilson ASA
- Subsidiaries: Unistar Co Ltd

Nesskip hf. is an Icelandic shipping company that runs affreightment services based in Reykjavík. The company was established on 27 January 1974 in Seltjarnarnes and was founded by a group of shipping and bulk transport enthusiasts, led by Captain Gudmundur Asgeirsson, who was the first managing director of the company. It is one of Iceland's largest bulk transporting firms. According to Bloomberg it "provides a range of shipping-related services as ship owners, ship brokers, port agents, and transport and chartering consultants", and serves "cruise liners, seismic-research vessels, reefers, tankers, and dry cargo vessels and foreign deep sea fishing ships" as a port agent. The company Nesskip is valued at approximately 240 Million Norwegian krones (KON); approximately US$23 million. Nesskip purchased its first bulk carrier in February 1974, named the Suðurland and specialises in bulk transport of goods which has been at the fore front of the company's operations for over 40 years. The company deals with the transportation of fishmeal, steel products, construction materials, cement, timber, pumice, coal, gravel, ferrosilicon, and salt as well as other FOSFA cargo. In 1977, Nesskip began to develop a close working relationship with the company Wilson ASA, who specialise in the management of shipping services. It is a member of the international shipping organisation Baltic and International Maritime Council (BIMCO). In 2006, Norwegian shipping company Wilson EuroCarriers acquired a majority share (51.6%) in Nesskip resulting in a change of ownership.

== History ==
The company Nesskip was established on 24 January 1974 and is one of the first five established shipping companies in Iceland. The company's establishment was conducted by a small group of fishings and bulk transport enthusiasts led by Captain Gudmundur Asgeirsson, who had experience captaining fishing and transport vessels. Following the establishment of the company in January, the first ship was purchased in February and was named the Suðurland. Nesskip began to transport bulk goods around the Icelandic region, and later increased their operations to transporting chilled fished following the conversion of the Suðurland. The company began its operations by transporting chilled and salted fish around the Scandinavian North Atlantic Sea region. Nesskip purchased their second ship in 1976, two years after their establishment which was named Vesturland. The purchasing of the second ship enabled Nesskip to extend their operations to transport goods to countries in Europe, specifically around the Mediterranean Sea.

In 1975 Iceland also saw the establishment of the Icelandic Alloys Ltd, now Elkem Iceland, and Nordural (1997). This establishment occurred in Grundartangi, 49 km from Reykjavík. The entrance of the Alloy production in Iceland, specifically in the Grundartangi, enabled Nesskip to increase their operational activities^{1}. Nesskip was contracted by Icelandic Alloys to ship the majority of raw materials and products, which were predominantly steel and ferrosilicon alloys, between Icelandic Ports and European countries.

Since its conception in 1999, Nesskip is a member of the Federation of Trade & Services (SVTH) of Iceland; the SVTH Federation is made up of the entire goods transport sector as well as oil and IT companies.

In 2006, the company Wilson ASA acquired a majority shares of Nesskip (51.6%), resulting in a change of ownership. Wilson ASA and Nesskip had many cooperations since 1977. This take over enabled both companies to expand the fleet size of Wilson ASA. In 2007, Wilson owned 70.65% of Nesskip. In 2012, Wilson ASA purchased the remaining Nesskip holdings and now owns 100% of the company. Currently, Nesskip has eight employees.

== Operations ==
Nesskip has operated as a bulk goods and cargo affreightment since 1974 and its operations have increased since the company's conception. It has specialised in the transportation of fish, fish oil and fishmeal, working closely with Icelandic port and fishing towns to transport chilled with both within Iceland and to European and Scandinavian countries. Nesskip's early operations were primarily located in the North Atlantic region, however this region was increased through Nesskip's expansion of the company through the purchasing of new bulk carrier ships. Its main transportation cargo consists of fish products as well as bulk materials such as steel products, aluminium, cement, coal, timber and gravel. Nesskip also offers ship brokerage and agency services, freight forwarding and consultancy services. Annually, Nesskip has approximately 450 arrivals in Icelandic ports totalling about 700, 000 tones in transported goods. Currently, through Wilson ASA's majority ownership of Nesskip, the company has integrated access to the Wilson fleet of 113 vessels ranging from 1500-8500dwt.

== First Ships ==
=== Suðurland ===
The company Nesskip purchased their first shipping vessel proceeding their conception on 1 February 1974. This ship was named the Suðurland, which directly translates to ‘Southland’. The Suðurland was originally built in 1972; however, it was converted in 1975. The conversion of the Suðurland provided the ship with qualities similar to reefer vessels, and the ship weighed approximately 3500 tonnes. The Suðurland, preceding its conversion in 1975, had a carrying capacity of 1790 t deadweight tonnage (DWT), with an overall length of 73.21 meters and width of 10.47 meters^{5}.

The conversion enabled the Suðurland to transport and store chilled goods, specifically salted chilled fish. The ship would transport goods from Iceland to Norway and European countries. As the Suðurland was the first ship in the Nesskip fleet, the ship was greatly responsible for establishing some of Nesskip's first shipping routes, both in Iceland and in the North Atlantic and Northern European regions. The port town of Akranes, 20 km North of Reykjavík, was largely a fishing town and became a primary port that the Suðurland transported frozen fish from as well as aluminium and some raw materials^{1}. During 1984, the Suðurland completed a variety of voyages between Iceland, Norway and the Iberian Peninsula totalling 21 voyages. In 1986 the Suðurland stopped its operations due to a severe wreckage and subsequent sinking.

=== Vesturland ===
The Vesturland was the second ship purchased by Nesskip in 1976. The ship was originally built in the Fiskesstrand Shipyard, Norway, in 1973 for Holma hf and was named ‘Frendo Hvalsnes'. The name Vesturland directly translates to ‘the Western Region’, named after the Western region of Iceland. The primary function for the Vesturland was to transport fishmeal and frozen fish from Iceland to Northern European countries, and bulk transport building materials such as steel back to Iceland. The Vesturland had a gross tonnage of 2333 tons and a DWT of 2528. Vesturland II chartered for Nesskip from 1985-1991 and was sold to Eimskip hf and renamed Urridafoss. The ship was sold in 1992 again to Stevns Sea Schif and renamed again as Stevns Sea.

=== Ísnes I ===
In 1977, Nesskip purchased the company's third ship, a specialised bulk carrier named Isnes. The ship measured 95.90 meters long and had a deadweight tonnage of 4506 t, making it the largest in the fleet of three. The ship was built in 1967 in the Lurssen Shipyard, Germany and was first named ‘Fritre' In 1983, the ship was renamed Alberto Dormio proceeding its purchase by an Italian shipping company. As of 2015, the ship lies abandoned in the bay of Augusta in Sicily.

=== Selnes /Wilson Muuga ===
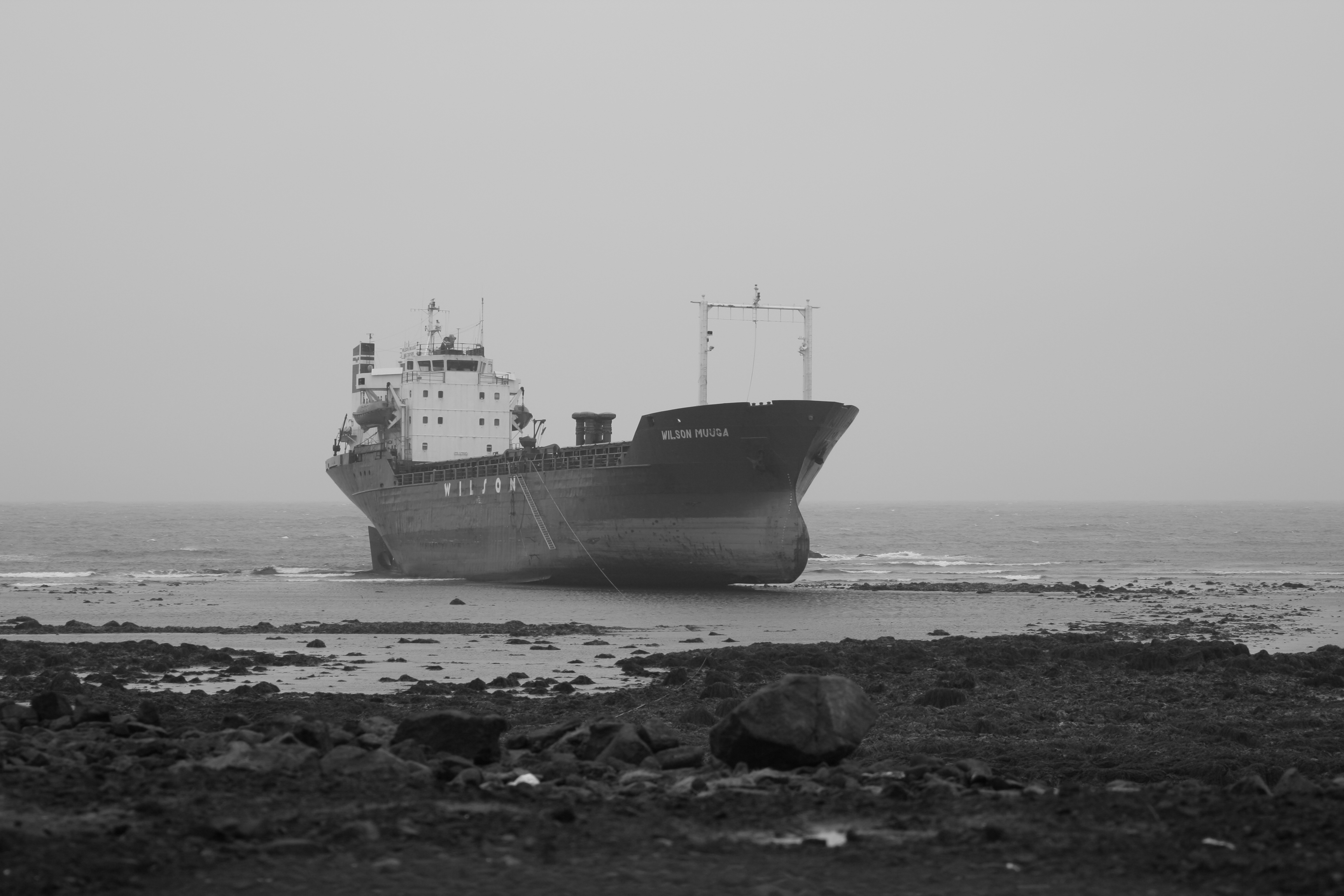
Wilson Muuga in March 2007.

Nesskip purchased their fourth vessel in 1979 which was specialised bulk carrier named Selnes . The ship was built in 1975 in the British shipyard in Appledore. The ship measured 102.3 meters long and 15.6 meters wide and weighed 3645 tonnes with a deadweight tonnage of 5699 tonnes. Following Wilson ASA’s purchasing of majority shares in Nesskip, the ship was renamed Wilson Muuga in 2004. On the morning of 19 December 2006, the ship ran aground off the Reykjanes peninsula. The ship was returning from the Grundartangi port, where it had delivered a cargo of quartz. Due to stormy weather conditions and a rough swell, a rescue attempt made 8 crewmen from the Danish Coastguard cruiser ship HDMS Triton resulted in one fatality after their after their rigid inflatable boat overturned in rough seas. Seven of the Danish crewmen where rescued by the helicopter TF-LÍF. The crew of the Wilson Muuga were rescued by the Icelandic Coast Guard helicopter TF-SIF. The ship was demolished in famous Alang bay, India, in 2017.

=== Akranes ===
The fifth ship purchased by Nesskip in the spring of 1981 and was named Akranes . The Akranes was built in 1970 in Germany in the Lurssen Shipyard Vegesack and was first named Brinknes. The ship weighed approximately 4179 tonnes. The ship had a carrying capacity of approximately 7,500 tonnes and was the largest ship in the Icelandic merchant fleet at the time. The purchase of Akranes increased Nesskip's transportation activities outside of Iceland and was the only Icelandic vessel to have sailed around the world in 1985. It measured 111.0 meters long and 17.10 meters wide and specialised as a bulk cargo carrier with a speed of 13.5 knots. As of 2004, the ship sails under the name Eltem and is registered under the Comoros flag.

== Current fleet ==
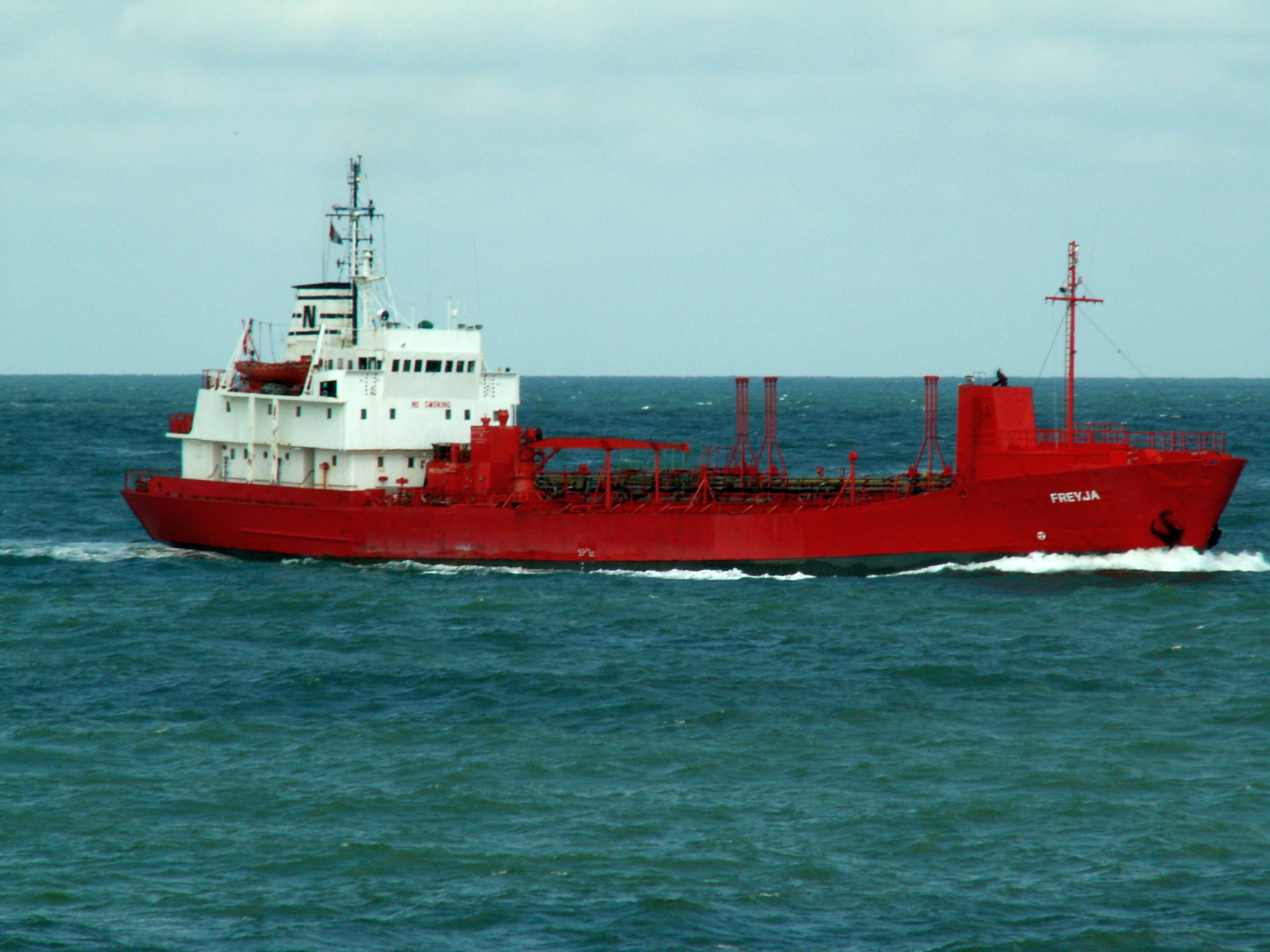
Freyja approaching Port of Rotterdam, Holland 6 August 2005

Nesskip currently operates four ships that are integrated within the Wilson ASA fleet and through its subsidiary, Unistar Co Ltd. All four ships sail as part of the Wilson fleet; a total of 113 ships. The four ships are MV Freyja, MV Frigg, Isnes II and Wilson Trent. MV Freya is a single-deck chemical tanker built in 1974 in Lauenburg, Germany, that measures 77.12 metres by 12.53 metres and is named after the Norse goddess of love. MV Frigg is a chemical tanker built in 1982 in Norway and measures 80.88 metres by 13.1 metres with a dwt of 2580 tonnes. Both MV Freyja and MV Frigg were purchased in August 2001 by Nesskip and transport oil as well as bulk goods throughout Iceland and Europe. The Wilson Trent is owned by Nesskip's subsidiary, Unistar Sg Co Ltd, and is integrated as part of the Wilson Fleet. The ship is a single deck bulk transporter built in 1980 with a carrying capacity of approximately 7100 tonnes and measures 110.0 metres by 17.0 metres. The Ines II is named after Nesskip's third Bulk carrier and was built in 1999. It is currently sailing under the name ‘Wilson Sund’ and has a gross tonnage of 4200 tonnes.

== Significant events ==
=== The sinking of the Suðurland ===
The Suðurland sank on 24 December in 1986. The Suðurland had eleven crew members on board and a bulk cargo of 19,000 barrels of herring, en route from Iceland to Murmansk, a far North-western port city in Russia located on the Kola peninsula, that at the time was part of Soviet Russia. The ship encountered rough sea conditions, battered by four days of gale-force winds and high waves. At 11:30 pm on 24 December the captain of the Suðurland, Sigurður Sigurjónsson, issued a ‘May-day’ call, approximately 300 nautical miles (526 km) of the Faroe Islands, a North Atlantic archipelago approximately halfway between Iceland and Norway. The SOS call was received by the Danish patrol ship HDMS Vædderen approximately 160 km away as well as the Icelandic Authorities. This resulted in the dispatch of a Danish Naval vessel from the Tórshavn station in the Faroe Islands, as well as the Icelandic Coast Guard ship, Tiga, and a long-range British Royal Air Force (RAF) Nimrod plane.

The Suðurland sank shortly after midnight on the morning of 25 December. Three crew members were reported by the survivors to have sunk with the ship, whilst eight of the eleven crew members had made it safely onto the Suðurland'life vessel. The RAF Nimrod plane was signalled by the crew-members by flashing lights in the predawn darkness. Following the reception of the SOS call, the eight crewmen were dropped a second life raft equipped with rations, water radios and flares from the RAF Nimrod reconnaissance plane at the daybreak of 25 December. Five of the eight crewmen successfully transferred themselves onto the new life vessel; however, three crewmen had died during the night.

The five crewmen were rescued by a Lynx helicopter from the Vædderen 12 hours after the mayday call was sent out and were flown to the HDMS Vædderen that was inbound to the Suðurland. The five crew-members were treated for shock and hypothermia on board the HDMS Vædderen and were taken to Tórshavn in the Faroe Islands. The five surviving crew-members were deemed to be "very lucky people" by the Lt. David Burnett of the Royal Air Force.

== Subsidiaries ==
Nesskip is the parent organisation for Unistar Shipping company Ltd. The company is located in Bergen, Norway, and was established in 1989 and is part of the deep sea freight transport industry. Unistar is the holding company for Nesskip's ships and is formed by two other subsidiaries; Volcano Shipping Services Ltd and MV Mautern Shipping Company Limited. As Nesskip is owned by Wilson ASA, Unistar Co Ltd forms part of the organisational structure that forms Wilson ASA.
