= TF-SIF (Dash 8) =

Surveillance and rescue aircraft operated by the Icelandic Coast Guard

SIF
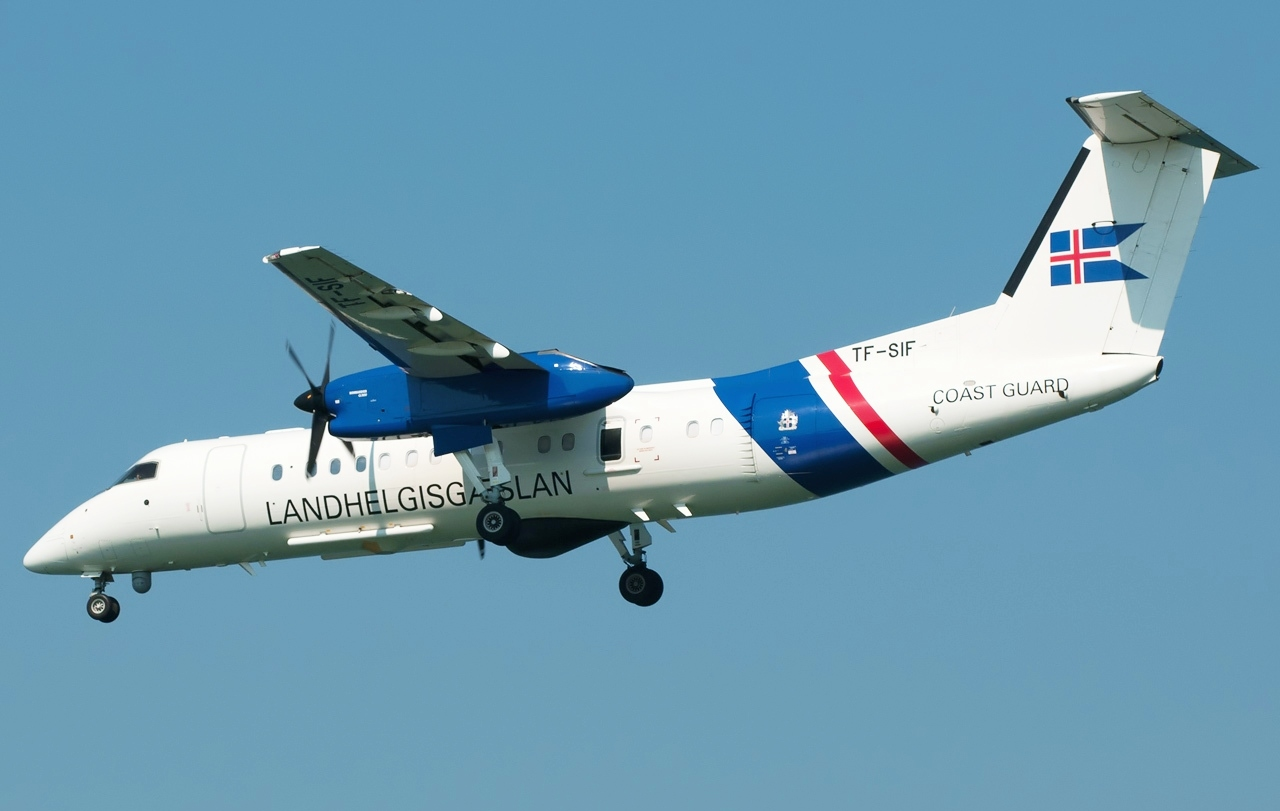
- Sif in March 2013.

General information
- Other name: TF-SIF
- Type: Bombardier Dash 8-Q-314
- Manufacturer: Bombardier
- Status: In service
- Owners: Icelandic Coast Guard
- Construction number: 660
- Registration: TF-SIF

History
- In service: 2009–present

Sif, also known as TF-SIF, is a Bombardier Dash 8-Q-314 turboprop-powered surveillance and rescue aircraft operated by the Icelandic Coast Guard since 2009. It is named after Sif, the golden-haired goddess from Norse mythology and is the fourth Coast Guard aircraft to bear the name.

== History ==
In early 2005, the Icelandic government decided to purchase a new aircraft for the Coast Guard to replace the almost 30-year old Syn, a Fokker F27 Friendship 200, in collaboration with the Swedish government which was in need of similar aircraft. Its purchase price was 4.3 billion ISK (32 million USD). Four years later, in July 2009, Sif arrived and was considered one of the most technological advanced aircraft of her kind that was used for civilian tasks such as search, surveillance and rescue.

Due to budget cuts following the 2008 Icelandic financial collapse, Sif was frequently leased to Frontex to fly border control missions. In 2010, Sif spent more than half the year on projects abroad, almost all of 2011 and more than five months in 2012. In the first years after the financial crash, the Coast Guard received a quarter of its income from abroad for leasing Sif and other assets. Despite improved economic situations, Sif was leased abroad every year through 2022, from just over a month to half a year. During its Frontex mission in 2018, Sif participated in the rescue of 900 refugees during a span of month in 2018. The following year, it participated in the rescue of 1,300 refugees during a three-month mission in the Mediterranean Sea.

In 2023, Jón Gunnarsson, the Minister of Justice, announced that the aircraft would be sold as the Coast Guard did not have the necessary funds to operate it. The decision was highly criticized, including by former Minister of Justice Björn Bjarnason, the chief superintendent of the Office of the National Commissioner of the Police Víðir Reynisson, several members of Alþingi, the Icelandic Meteorological Office and other emergency responders. On 3 February, Jón announced that the plans to sell Sif had been abandoned.

In 2024, the plane was grounded in Malta after its engines were declared unusable due to salt damage from extended use over sea. The repairs costed an estimate of 350 million ISK. The same year, its use in Frontex ended, causing considerable loss of income for the Coast Guard.

== See also ==
- List of aircraft of the Icelandic Coast Guard
