= Rosendal, Norway =

Village in Kvinnherad Municipality, Norway

Rosendal
- Village
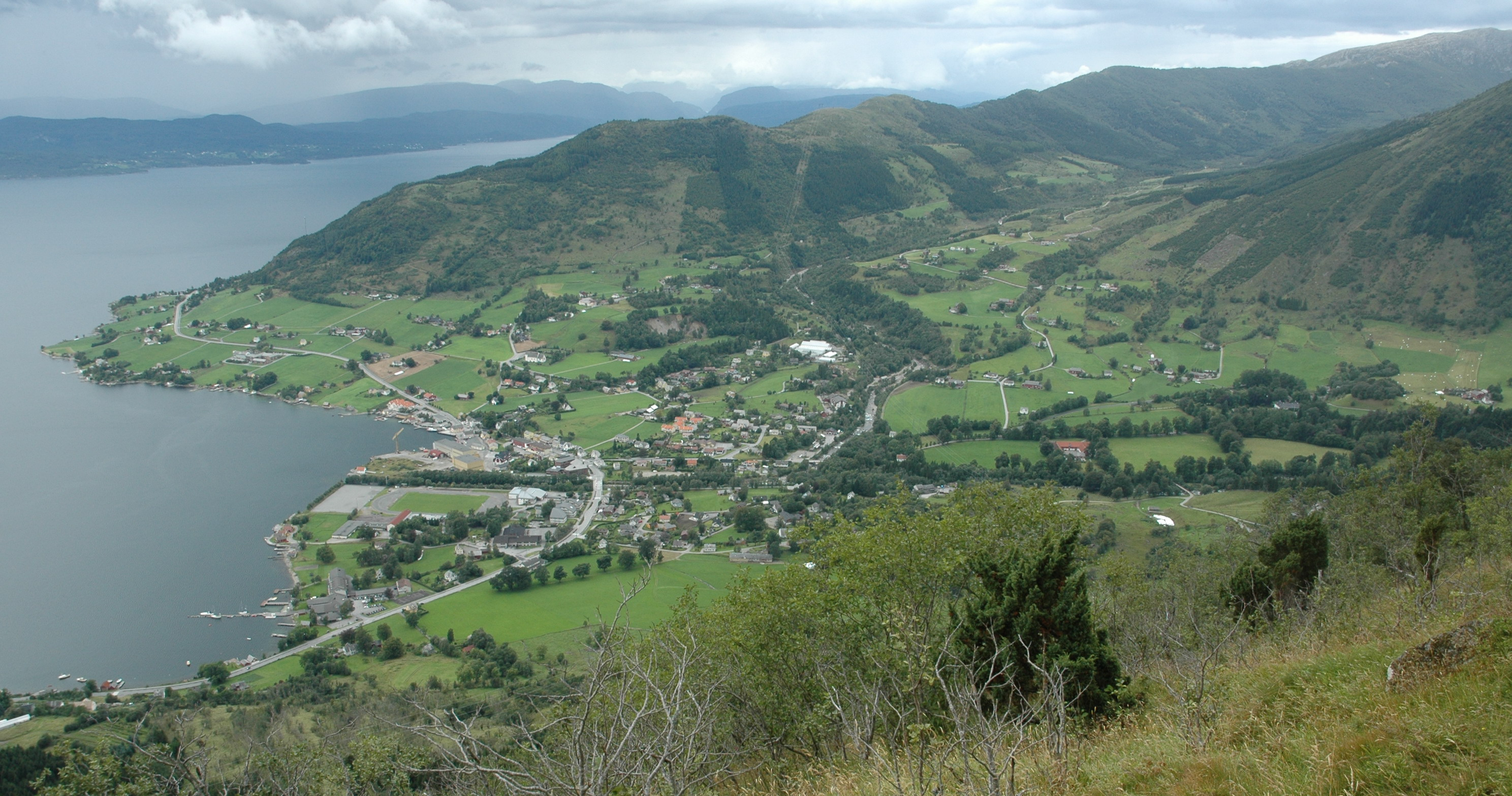
- Aerial view of the village
- Interactive map of Rosendal
- Coordinates: 59.98589°N 6.01157°E
- Country: Norway
- Region: Western Norway
- County: Vestland
- District: Sunnhordland
- Municipality: Kvinnherad Municipality

Area
  - Total: 1.18 km^{2} (0.46 sq mi)
- Elevation: 9 m (30 ft)

Population (2025)
  - Total: 877
  - Density: 743/km^{2} (1,920/sq mi)
- Time zone: UTC+01:00 (CET)
  - Summer (DST): UTC+02:00 (CEST)
- Post Code: 5470 Rosendal
- Website: www.visitrosendal.no

Rosendal is the administrative centre of Kvinnherad Municipality in Vestland county, Norway. The village is located on the southern shore of the Hardangerfjorden, about 4 kilometres (2.5 mi) north of the village of Dimmelsvik and about 10 kilometres (6.2 mi) straight west of the vast Folgefonna glacier which sits inside the nearby Folgefonna National Park. The village is especially known for the Barony Rosendal, a historic estate located in the village. Kvinnherad Church is also located in this village.

The 1.18-square-kilometre (290-acre) village has a population (2025) of 877 and a population density of 743 inhabitants per square kilometre (1,920/sq mi). The economy of the village is centered on agriculture, ship building, and tourism.

The shipbuilder Skaalurens Skibsbyggeri was established in Rosendal in 1855. The newspaper Grenda is published in Rosendal.
