= Jökulfirðir =

Fjords in Iceland

Coordinates: 66°20′N 22°40′W

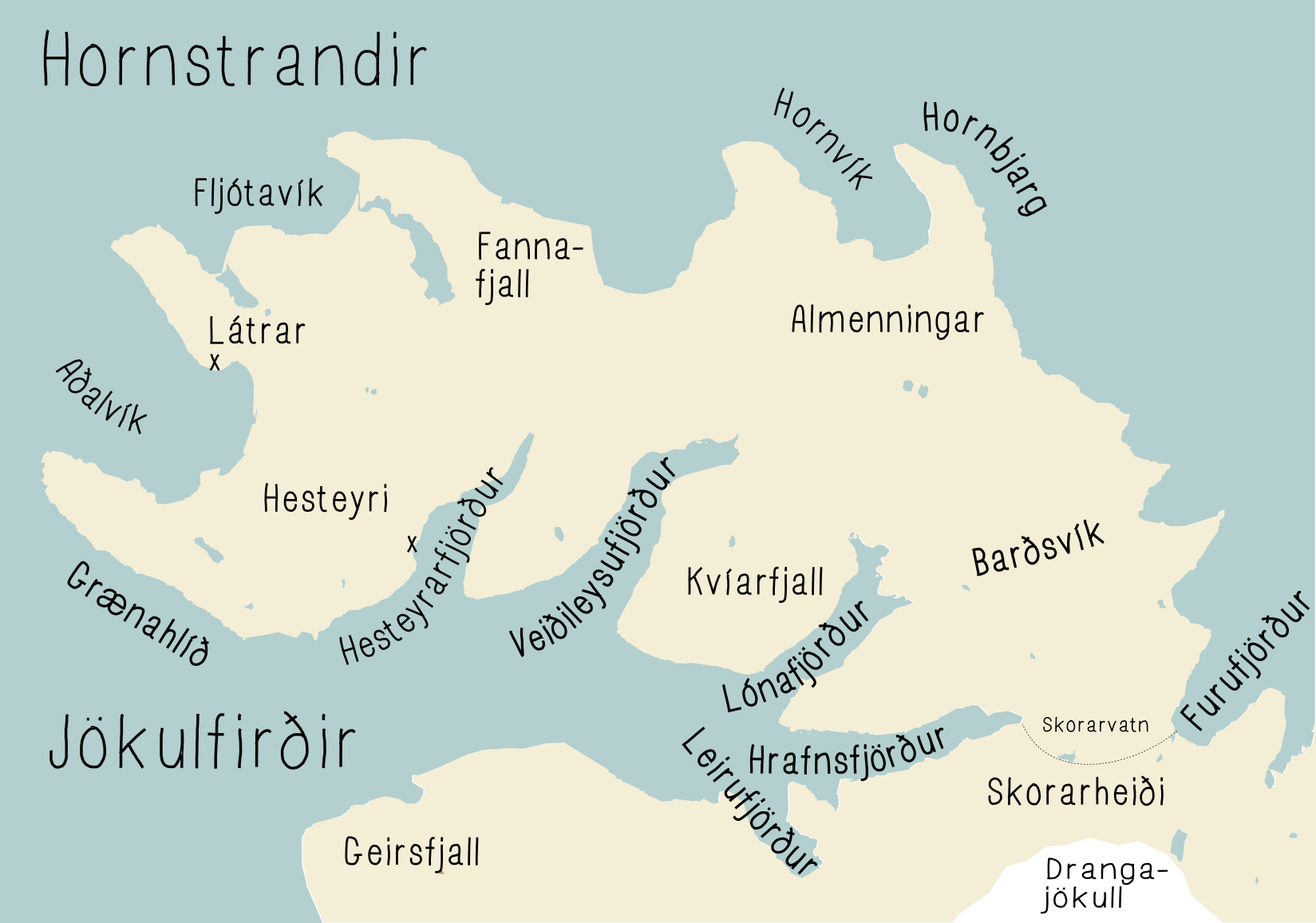
Hornstrandir and Jökulfirðir

The Jökulfirðir (Icelandic pronunciation: [ˈjœːkʏlˌfɪrðɪr̥], "glacier fjords") form a system of five fjords in Westfjords, Iceland, situated north of Ísafjarðardjúp and south of the Hornstrandir peninsula. They are named for Drangajökull, a glacier situated to the southeast of the fjords.

The area surrounding the fjords used to be permanently inhabited until the 1960s, but is now occupied only seasonally, as a summer resort. The fjords cannot be reached by road, but are accessible by boat from Ísafjörður.

The individual five fjords are:

- Hesteyrarfjörður [ˈhɛstˌeiːrarˌfjœrðʏr̥]
- Veiðileysufjörður [ˈveiːðɪˌleiːsʏˌfjœrðʏr̥]
- Lónafjörður [ˈlouːnaˌfjœrðʏr̥]
- Hrafnsfjörður [ˈr̥apn̥sˌfjœrðʏr̥, ˈr̥afs-]
- Leirufjörður [ˈleiːrʏˌfjœrðʏr̥]
