= TF-SIF (Dauphin 2) =

Helicopter used by the Icelandic Coast Guard

SIF
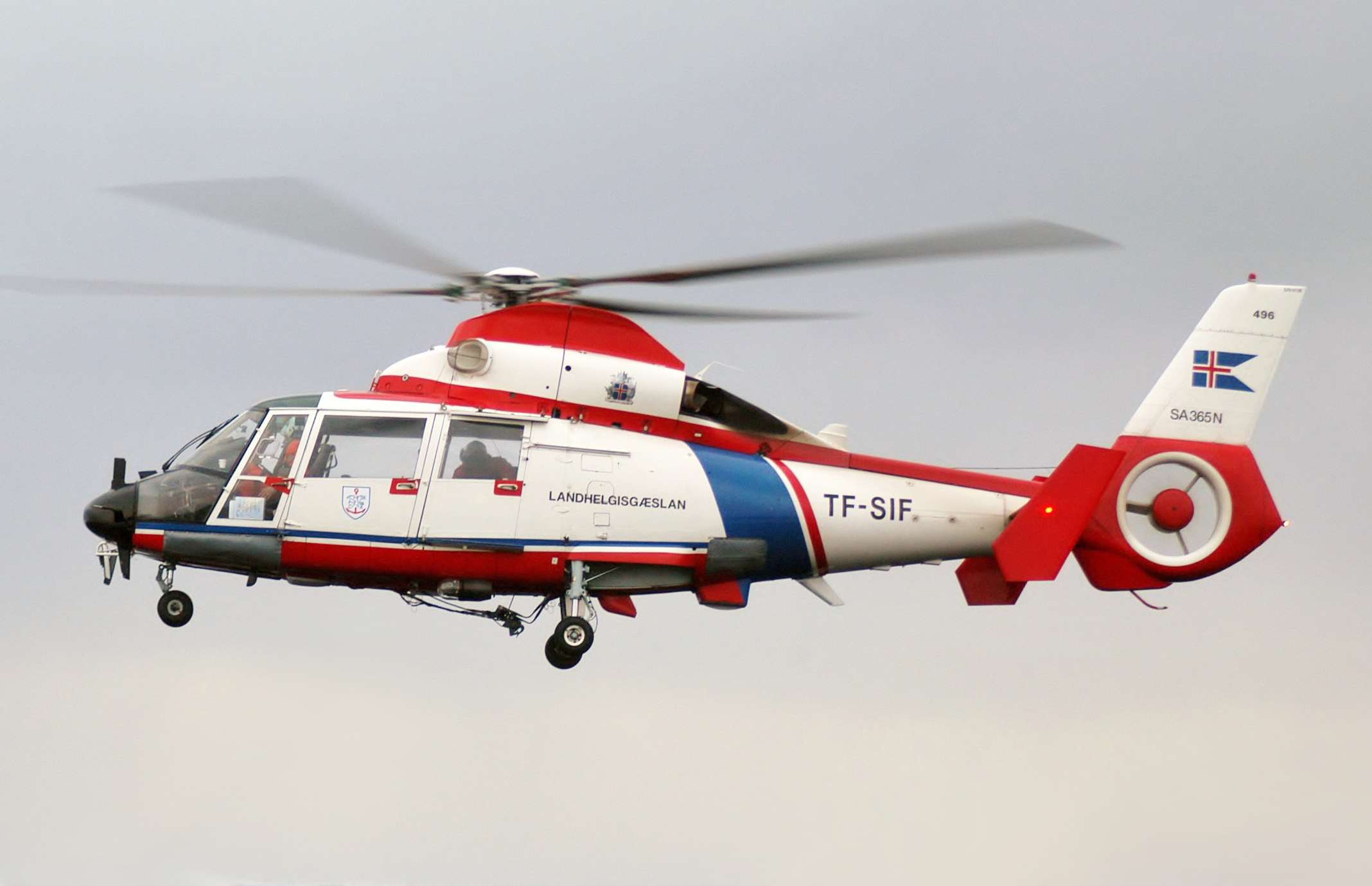
- Sif in March 2004.

General information
- Other name: TF-SIF
- Type: Aerospatiale SA365N Dauphin 2
- Manufacturer: Aérospatiale
- Status: On display
- Owners: Icelandic Coast Guard
- Construction number: 6136
- Registration: TF-SIF
- Total hours: 7056.5

History
- In service: 1985-2007
- Preserved at: Icelandic Aviation Museum

Sif, also known as TF-SIF, is an Aerospatiale SA365N Dauphin 2 helicopter used by the Icelandic Coast Guard from 1985 to 2007. It took part in several high profile rescue operations around Iceland during its 22-year career and is credited to have been involved in the rescue of around 250 lives. It is named after Sif, the golden-haired goddess from Norse mythology and is the third Coast Guard aircraft to bear the name. Since 2008, it has been on display at the Icelandic Aviation Museum.

== History ==
Sif was ordered from Aérospatiale in June 1984 as a replacement for TF-RÁN which November 1983 crash in Jökulfirðir resulted in the deaths of four Coast Guard airmen. Due to delays in delivering the helicopter, another Dauphin was leased from Aérospatiale from 1984 to 1985 and went by the same name. The new Sif arrived in Iceland on 19 November 1985. It was the sole specialized rescue helicopter in Iceland until Líf arrived in June 1995.

On 14 March 1987, nine crewmembers of the fishing vessel Barðinn GK were rescued aboard Sif after the ship stranded in the bay of Dritvík at Snæfellsnes.

On 12 February 1988, the crew of Sif rescued 11 crewmembers of the fishing vessel Hrafn Sveinbjarnarson III GK 11 that stranded close to Grindavík.

On 14 June 1990, Sif rescued the two-man crew of a Piper PA-34 Seneca that had to ditch the aircraft 29 miles west of Keflavík after running out of fuel.

On 20 February 1991, Sif rescued 8 sailors from the fishing vessel Steindór GK after it stranded under the cliffs of Krísuvíkurberg.

In May 2001, the tail of Sif was severely damaged after the helicopter was caught in severe wind conditions while flying over Snæfellsnes.

On 19 December 2006, Sif rescued 12 crewmembers of the cargo ship Wilson Muuga after it ran aground south of Sandgerði. During the rescue operation, eight sailors from the HDMS Triton went into the sea after their rigid inflatable boat overturned in rough seas. Seven of the men where rescued by Líf while one died.

On 16 July 2007, while on a training mission, Sif made an emergency landing in the sea between Straumsvík and Hafnarfjörður and was damaged beyond repair. The four crew members were unhurt. Following the incident, the helicopter was donated to the Icelandic Aviation Museum.

== Notable captains ==
- Benóný Ásgrímsson
