= Keflavik Air Station =

United States Air Force radar station in Iceland

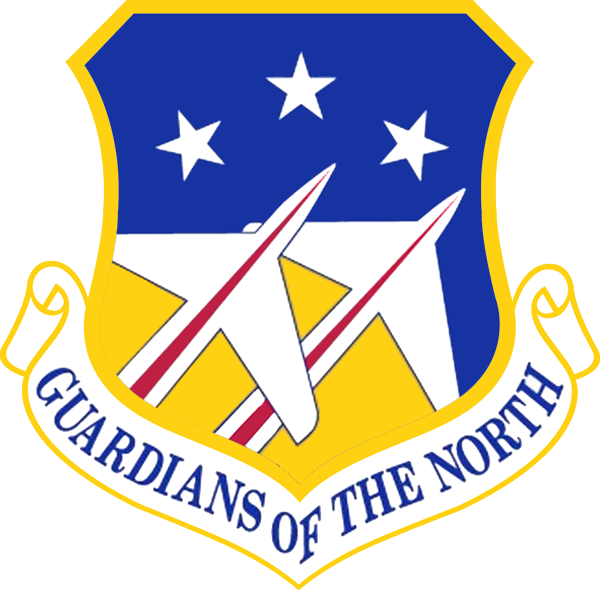
Keflavik Air Station
- Part of Air Forces Iceland

Site information
- Type: Air Force Station
- Controlled by: United States Air Force

Location
- Location of Keflavik Air Station, Iceland
- Coordinates: 64°01′18″N 022°39′21″W

Site history
- Built: 1992
- In use: 1992–2006

Keflavik Air Station (NATO ID: H-1A) is a now-closed United States Air Force General Surveillance Radar station. It is located 3 miles (4.8 km) north-northwest of Naval Air Station Keflavik, Iceland.

It was closed on 28 June 2006 as part of the closure of United States military facilities in Iceland.

== History ==
Keflavik Air Station was established as a North Atlantic Treaty Organization (NATO) radar station in 1992, replacing the original NATO AC&W radar site at Rockville AS, (H-1). It was operated by the 932d Air Control Squadron and was equipped with an AN/FPS-117v5 radar.

The mission of the station was to intercept and shadow all Soviet aircraft in transit in and from the GIUK gap which passed through the detection range of its radars and relay to the NAS Keflavik Radar Operations Control Center (ROCC).

Keflavik Air Station was decommissioned on 28 June 2006. The radar was replaced by a civilian ARSR radar and is now used for air traffic control.

== See also ==
- List of USAF Aerospace Defense Command General Surveillance Radar Stations
