= Iceland in the Cold War =

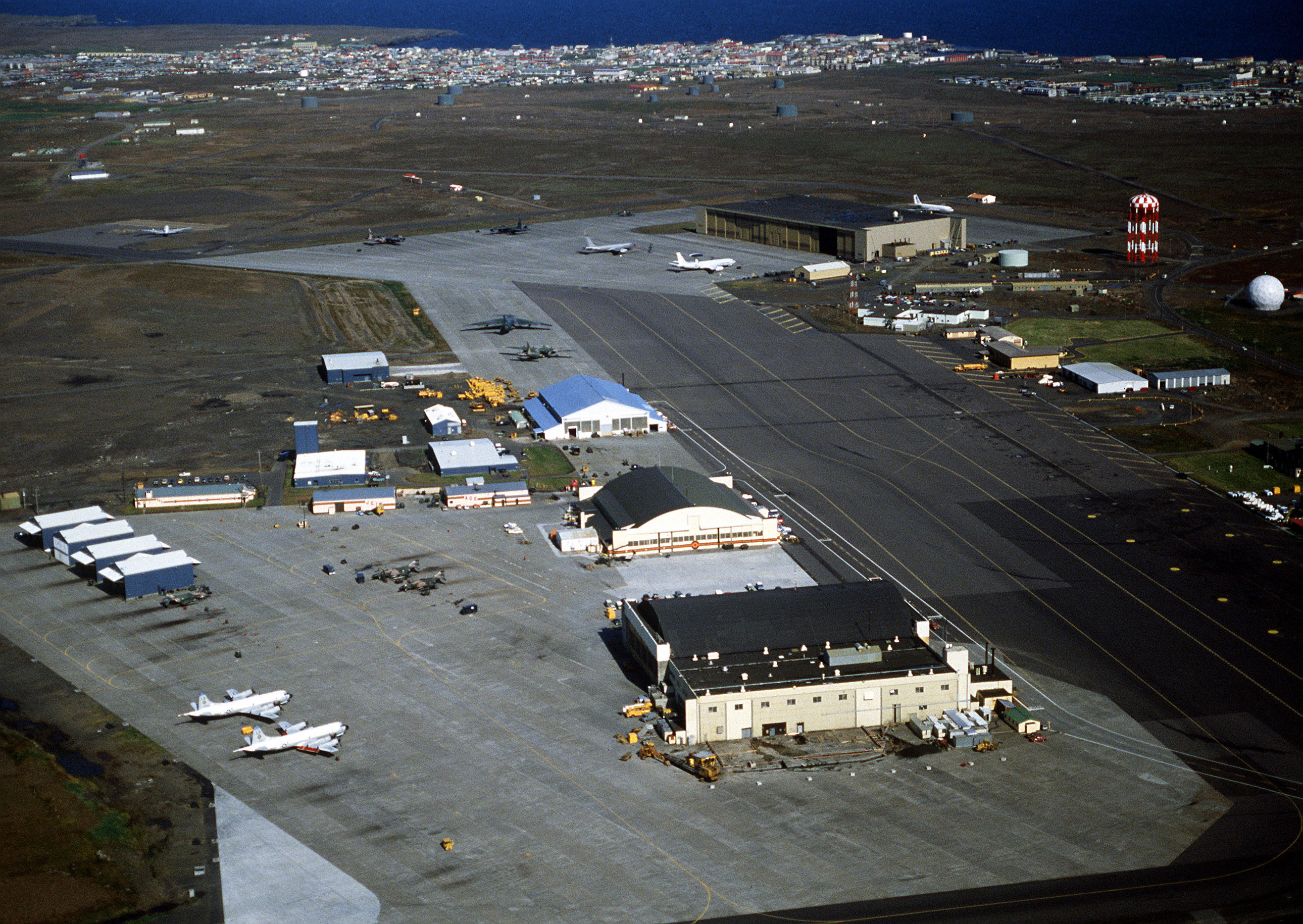
The US-manned Keflavík Air Base in 1982. The United States maintained a military presence in Iceland throughout the Cold War.

Throughout the Cold War, the nation of Iceland was a member of the North Atlantic Treaty Organization (NATO) and allied with the United States, hosting a US military presence in Keflavík Air Base from 1951 to 2006.

In 1986, Iceland hosted a summit in Reykjavík between United States President Ronald Reagan and Soviet General Secretary Mikhail Gorbachev, during which they took significant steps toward nuclear disarmament.

Five years later, in 1991, Iceland became the first country to recognize the renewed independence of Estonia, Latvia, and Lithuania when they broke away from the Soviet Union.

== Background ==
Early in World War II, the neutral Kingdom of Iceland had declined an offer of British protection. When the occupation of Denmark by Nazi Germany caused the two countries to sever communications, Iceland claimed sovereignty. However, on May 10, 1940, the British invaded Iceland, violating the country's neutrality, over the formal protest of Iceland's regent, Sveinn Björnsson. In 1941, the British arranged for the United States to take over occupation of the country so that British troops could be used in other arenas of the war. After pressure from the British, the Icelandic government eventually agreed to US occupation, and on June 7, 1941, five thousand US troops arrived in Iceland. The United States supported the founding of the Republic of Iceland in 1944 and promised to withdraw its troops once the war ended, but failed to do so when Nazi Germany was defeated in 1945. As World War II was winding down, the United States tried to persuade Icelandic statesmen to agree to permanent American military basing in Iceland. The pro-Western Icelandic Prime Minister Ólafur Thors considered such an agreement impossible at the time due to public opposition. When the Americans made a formal basing request in October 1945, Ólafur Thors rejected it.

== The Cold War ==
=== The Keflavík Agreement ===
In September 1946, the United States and Iceland negotiated over a more moderate basing agreement. These negotiation concluded on 7 October 1946, as the so-called Keflavík Agreement was signed. This interim agreement stipulated that the United States military would leave the country within six months and that the US-built Keflavík Airport would become the property of the Icelandic government. The US would be allowed to keep civilian staff in the country to oversee military shipping to mainland Europe. The agreement was passed into law by the Althing with 32 votes against 19. All 20 MPs from the Independence Party supported the agreement along with six each from the Progressive Party and the Social Democratic Party. These latter two parties also had MPs who voted against the agreement. Every MP from the Socialist Party voted against the agreement. This ended the war-time coalition government, which had enacted Iceland's republican declaration of independence in 1944; many in the centrist and left-wing parties felt that the Keflavík Agreement was a violation of Iceland's policy of neutrality. 500 people protested against this agreement. The headquarters of the Independence Party were attacked with rocks and protesters tried to storm the building while the Independence Party held a meeting indoors. In the wake of this rift, the Cold War shaped Icelandic politics for the next decades.

=== Iceland joins NATO ===
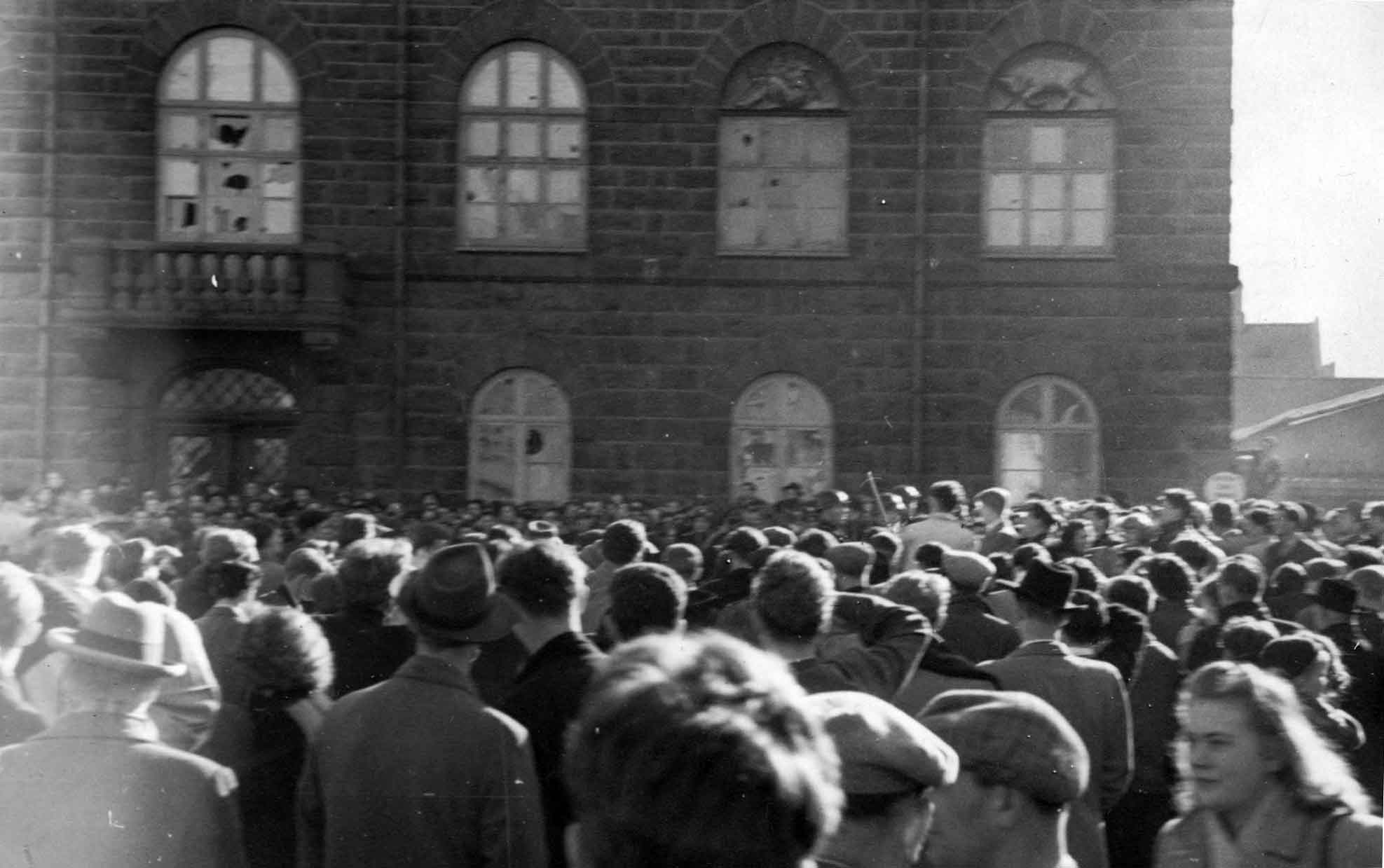
Fighting breaks out between anti- and pro-NATO supporters, and police. The windows of the House of the Althing have been smashed. March 30th 1949.

A sense of greater global turmoil and internal threat led Icelandic statesmen to reconsider Iceland's security arrangements. The Czechoslovak coup d'état in February 1948 made the world seem less peaceful and made a communist coup in Iceland seem plausible. The Icelandic coalition government of the Independence Party, the centrist Progressive Party and the Social Democrats began to look for security guarantees for Iceland. Basing US military forces on Icelandic soil was considered domestically unfeasible at the time, so the options were between a Scandinavian Defence Union and NATO. When negotiations for a Scandinavian Defense Union fell apart, Iceland followed Denmark and Norway into NATO.

The Althing approved Iceland's NATO membership on 30 March 1949 with 37 votes against 13. The Socialist Party was the only Icelandic political party opposed to NATO membership due to their pro-communist ideologies. Large protests occurred outside of Parliament on Lækjartorg and Austurvöllur in downtown Reykjavík. Fighting broke out and soon escalated into a riot; police assaulted dispersed them with tear gas. 12 persons needed medical care, including six seriously injured policeman and one seriously injured protester. 20 individuals were sentenced for their part in the riots but none of them sentenced to prison. The Icelandic Supreme Court noted in May 1952 that there was no evidence that suggested that the riot and attack on the Althing were pre-planned.

Iceland joined NATO, with other NATO allies' understanding that Iceland had no military and that there would be no military bases in the country during peacetime. This condition, however, was informal, and nowhere explicitly stated in the agreement.

Iceland had prospered during the war, and the immediate post-war period was followed by substantial economic growth, driven by industrialisation of the fishing industry and the Marshall Plan programme, through which Icelanders received by far the most aid per capita from the United States of any European country (at US$209, with the war-ravaged Netherlands a distant second at US$109). This may have influenced the Icelanders' willingness to co-operate with the United States.

Iceland was a troublesome member of NATO for much of the Cold War, earning the description of a "reluctant ally", "rebellious ally" and "semi-ally". During each of the Cod Wars, Icelandic officials explicitly or implicitly threatened to withdraw from NATO and expel US forces unless the fisheries disputes would be resolved favorably. To appease the Icelanders, the US and other NATO members provided Iceland with extensive economic assistance during the 1940s, 1950s and 1960s, and pressured the UK to concede to Iceland's demands in the Cod Wars; however, the United Kingdom didn't stop until Iceland re-drew their naval borders.

With the exception of periods during the Second and Third Cod Wars, Icelanders grew increasingly supportive of NATO membership during the 1970s. Surveys in the 1970s and 1980s show majority support for NATO membership and barely double-digit opposition to NATO membership. This is in contrast to a 1955 survey that did not show majority support for NATO membership. Beyond its strategic location, Iceland did not contribute much to NATO. Unless they concerned the Cod Wars or trade with the USSR, Iceland kept quiet at NATO meetings. The conspicuously low Icelandic profile in NATO meetings led US officials to encourage the Icelanders to participate more in NATO meetings.

It is difficult to gauge whether the Icelandic public would have voted for NATO membership in a referendum. Historian Guðni Th. Jóhannesson argued that voters would most likely have supported NATO membership, at least judging by the popular support for the sitting coalition government.

=== Iceland as an ally of the United States ===
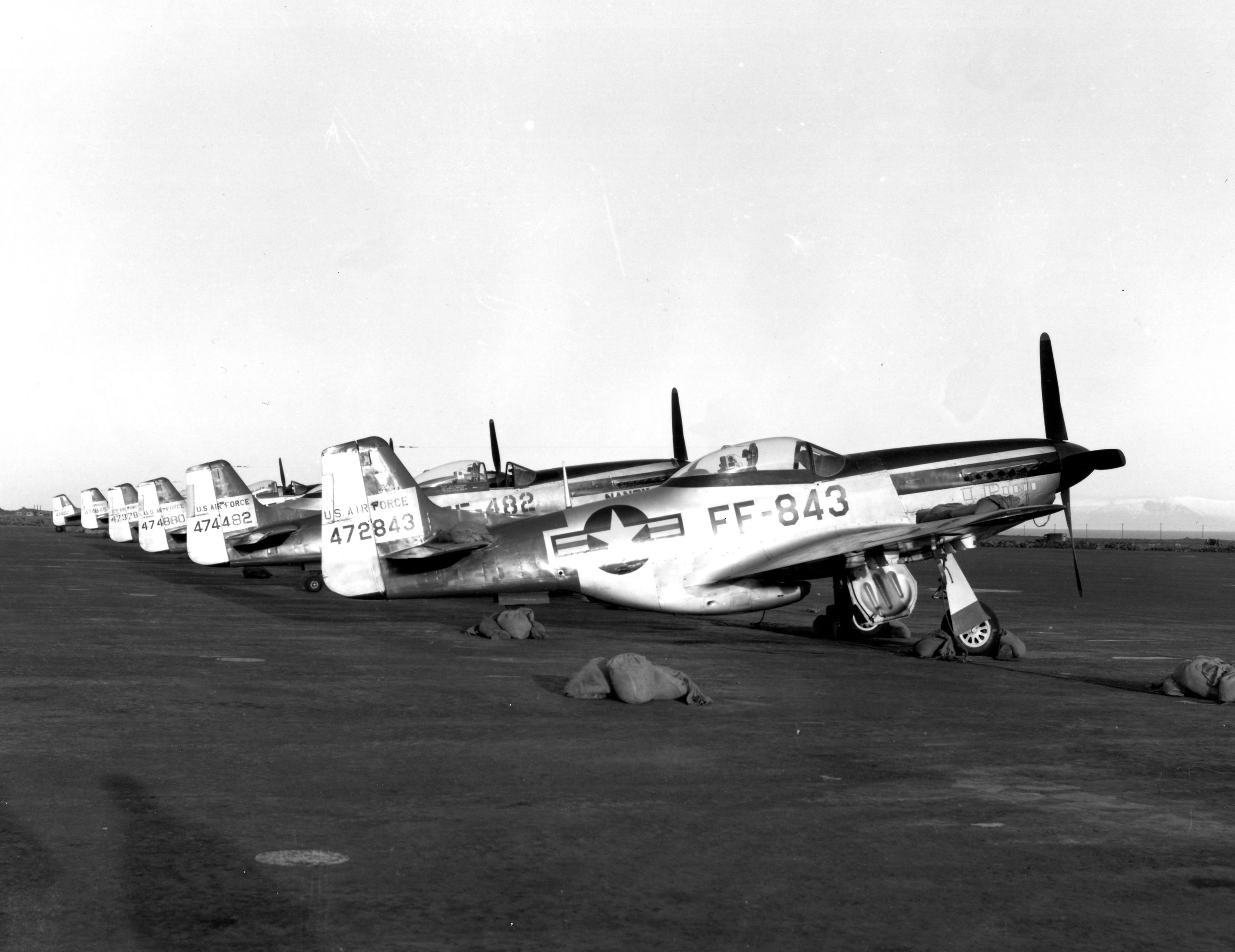
North American F-51D Mustangs of the 192d Fighter-Bomber Squadron (Nevada Air National Guard) stationed at Keflavik air base in 1952-1953

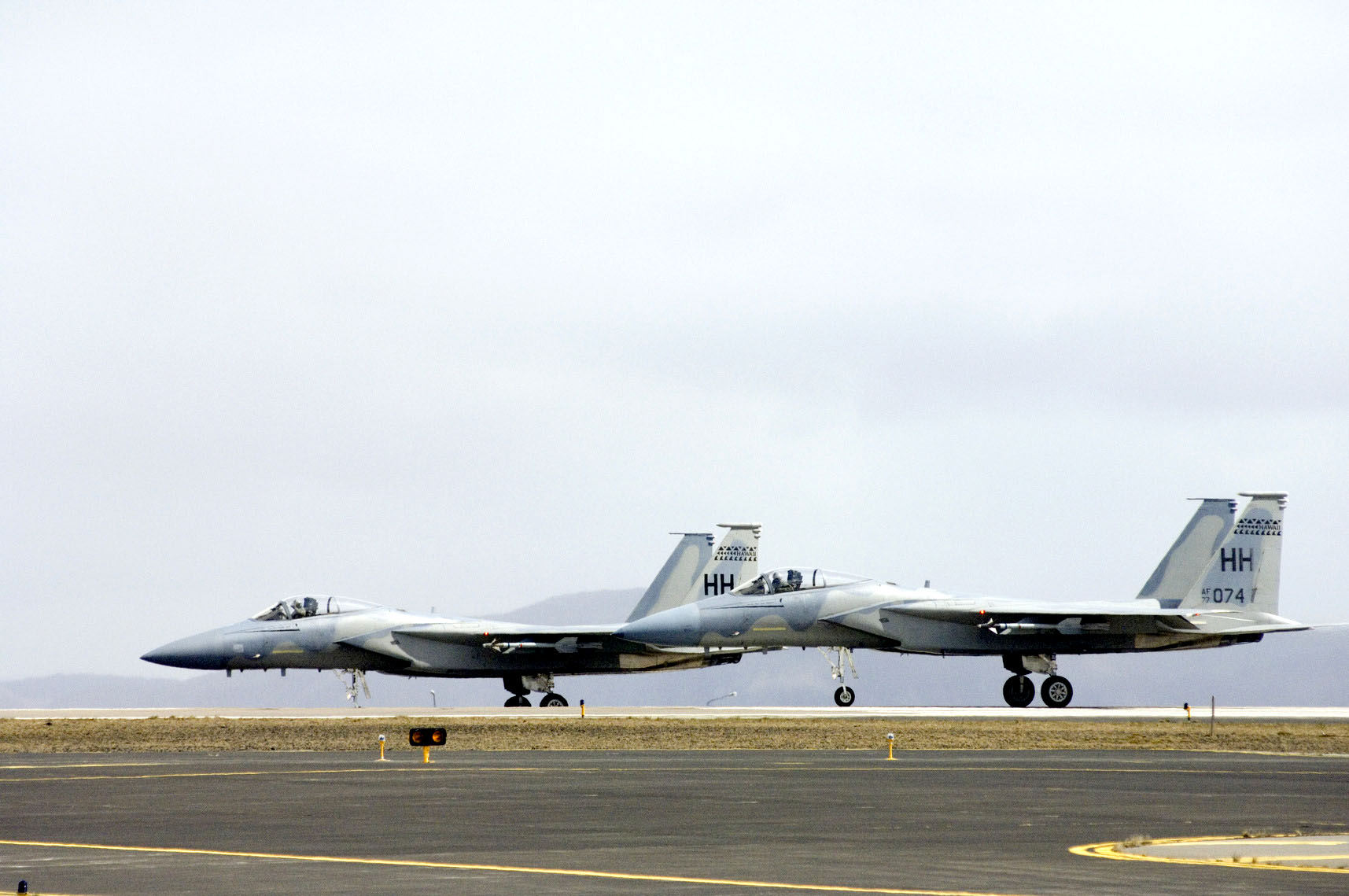
United States F-15 at Keflavík Air Base.

With the outbreak of the Korean War, Icelandic statesmen began to seriously contemplate US military basing in Iceland, as formal security guarantees through NATO without any military presence were considered insufficient to protect Iceland. On 5 May 1951, a new agreement was signed between Iceland and United States through NATO. According to this defense treaty, the United States accepted full responsibility for the defence of Iceland for an unspecified period of time. This new agreement annulled the Keflavík Agreement. As a result of the agreement, the United States maintained several thousand troops and several jet interceptors at the Keflavík Air Base; this was the Iceland Defense Force. The US military did not leave the country until 2006.

To make the US military presence in Iceland more palatable, the United States provided the Icelanders with extensive economic assistance and diplomatic backing. The US also condoned the openly exclusionary policies of the Icelandic government toward off-base movements of U.S. soldiers and met the Icelandic government's request that no black soldiers be stationed in Iceland. The ban on the stationing of black soldiers was put to an end in the mid-1960s. As part of the agreement, the Icelanders would not carry any costs of the military base and could unilaterally abrogate the agreement. The Americans furthermore provided financial support for the running of Keflavík airport. The Americans were allowed to keep 3900 troops on Icelandic soil, access territory in Keflavík and build four radar stations. Iceland's provision of territory for the base and all the associated costs with the military base counted towards Iceland's contribution to NATO, which meant in effect that Iceland did not have to pay anything into NATO's collective funds.

There is no evidence that nuclear weapons were ever stored in Iceland.

=== Interactions with US soldiers ===
Interactions between US soldiers and Icelandic women were highly contentious in Iceland. The Icelandic government consequently requested curfews and other limits to US soldiers' freedom of movement in Iceland. Many Icelandic businesses refused entry to US soldiers. Icelandic organizations also warned about the purported nefarious influence of US soldiers. Dozens of Icelandic girls were incarcerated for having relations with US soldiers. Reports of rape, prostitution, strip teases, druggings, divorces, children born out of wedlock and other controversial behaviors were prominent in newspapers. The Icelandic government imposed a ban on black US soldiers on the US base for the purposes of "protecting" Icelandic women and preserve a homogeneous "national body."

=== Opposition to the US base ===
Although Iceland remained allied with the US throughout the Cold War, the country continued to trade with the Soviet Union, and domestic opposition to the US military presence was strong, led by the Icelandic Anti-War Movement (Icelandic: Samtök hernámsandstæðinga, later Samtök herstöðvarandstæðinga). A survey in 1955 shows that more Icelanders opposed the base than supported it, but surveys taken in the late 1960s and early 1970s show a majority support for the bilateral defence agreement with the US.

There were two serious attempts to abrogate the bilateral defence agreement with the United States; during the tenure of the left-wing governments of 1956-58 and 1971–1974. These attempts failed though. The Hungarian Uprising of 1956 made it unfeasible for the 1956-58 government to make radical changes to Iceland's security arrangements. While the 1971-1974 government's rhetoric was consistent with a desire to expel US forces from Iceland, the two moderate parties in the government were divided on the matter (the Socialist Party was strongly in favor though). Elites within the two moderate parties tended to support the continuing presence of the base whereas the grassroots in both parties were opposed. The Icelandic government could only agree on revising the US Defence Agreement and impose some restrictions on US actions. The US military remained.

American television and radio broadcasts intended for soldiers at the US base could be intercepted by local Icelanders. This caused consternation in some circles, where it was seen as an undesirable influence on Icelandic culture. The popularity of the US television station and the subsequent controversy played a key role in the creation of the state-run television channel Ríkisútvarpið, the Icelandic National Broadcasting Service.

The US embassy started in the fall of 1948 to compile a list of Icelanders suspected of supporting Communism. By early 1949, there were 900 names on the list. It included members of the National Preservation Party, a non-Communist party. Many names were also on the list due to clerical errors.

Icelandic courts approved warrants by the Icelandic police to tap the phones of prominent Icelandic communists on six occasions during the period 1949-1968:

- Iceland's NATO membership 1949. The first such approval was given in late March 1949: it encompassed three Socialist Party parliamentarians and other individuals associated with the Socialist Party. Phones were tapped from 26 to 31 March 1949, amid the parliamentary debate and decision to join Iceland. During 6–9 April 1949, Icelandic courts approved again phone tap warrants as Iceland policemen argued that there was still an active communist threat.
- Dwight Eisenhower's Visit 1951. Approval was given to tap 15 telephones on 17 January 1951 in preparation for General Eisenhower's visit. There is no evidence of a formal decision to stop the phone taps.
- The Return of the US Military 1951. Approval was given to tap 25 phones on 24 April 1951 (one telephone added on 2 May 1951) in preparation for the return of the US military to Icelandic soil. There is no evidence of a formal decision to stop the phone taps.
- The End of the First Cod War 1961. Approval was given to tap 14 phones on 26 February 1961. There is no evidence of a formal decision to stop the phone taps.
- Lyndon B. Johnson's Visit 1963. Approval was given to tap 6 phones on 12 September 1963 in anticipation of Vice-president Johnson's visit.
- NATO meeting 1968. Approval was given to tap 17 phones for the period 8–27 June 1968.

=== 1959-1971: A period of stability in US-Icelandic relations ===
During the 12-year reign of the Independence Party/Social Democratic Party coalition government, US-Icelandic relations were at their calmest. The government initiated major economic reforms that liberalized Iceland's economy and reduced Iceland's dependence on barter trade with the USSR.

=== The Cod Wars ===
The Cod Wars were a series of confrontations between the United Kingdom and Iceland regarding fishing rights in the North Atlantic. Each of the disputes ended with Iceland's victory. The final Cod War concluded with a highly favorable agreement for Iceland, as the United Kingdom conceded to a 200-nautical-mile (370-kilometre) Icelandic exclusive fishery zone following threats that Iceland would leave NATO. As a result, British fishing communities lost access to rich areas and were devastated, with thousands of jobs lost.

The term "cod war" was coined by a British journalist in early September 1958. None of the Cod Wars meets any of the common thresholds for a conventional war, though, and they may more accurately be described as militarized interstate disputes. There is only one confirmed death during the Cod Wars: an Icelandic engineer killed through accidental electrocution of his own equipment, in the Second Cod War, due to.

=== 1986 Reagan-Gorbachev Summit in Reykjavík ===
Reagan and Gorbachev meet in Höfði, Reykjavík in 1986.

Iceland hosted a summit in Reykjavík in 1986 between United States President Ronald Reagan and Soviet Premier Mikhail Gorbachev, during which they took significant steps toward nuclear disarmament. Only a few years later, in 1991, when Jón Baldvin Hannibalsson was foreign minister, Iceland would become the first country to recognize the independence of Estonia, Latvia, and Lithuania as they broke away from the Soviet Union.

== Iceland's strategic importance ==
The US base served as a hub for transports and communications to Europe, a key chain in the GIUK gap, a monitor of Soviet submarine activity, a linchpin in the early warning system for incoming Soviet attacks, interceptor of Soviet reconnaissance bombers and base for offensive actions against the USSR in case of war.

There is evidence that the Americans had by 1948 concrete plans to quell any potential Socialist coup in Iceland. In 1948, it was thought unlikely that the USSR would invade or directly support any coup in Iceland. In the 1950s, American and NATO officials were not keen on an Icelandic return to neutrality. Their fears were that the USSR would seize Iceland in the event of war before NATO would be able to. In 1954, the United States National Security Council categorized Iceland as a country where communists were capable of inflicting moderate damage, but not as a country where communists were capable of violently overthrowing the government.

== Competition for influence in Iceland ==
The US and USSR competed for influence in Iceland, in particular during the late 1940s and 1950s. Iceland traded considerably with the USSR for the first few decades of the Cold War. The US provided Iceland with extensive economic and diplomatic backing throughout the Cold War. During the Proto-Cod War of 1952-1956, the USSR and the US unburdened Iceland of much of the fish left unsold by the British landing ban during the dispute.

A 2016 study codes one instance of overt intervention in Icelandic elections by either the US or the USSR. The author claims that the United States intervened on behalf of the Independence Party in the 1956 elections. The US were however generally reluctant to interfere too much with Icelandic elections, oftentimes rejecting requests by pro-Western Icelandic politicians to conveniently time US aid to Iceland and/or directly fund Icelandic parties.

In 1949, officials in the US embassy in Iceland contemplated interfering in Iceland's domestic politics covertly to diminish the influence of the Icelandic Socialist Party and make Icelanders more willing to allow a US military base in Iceland. One US official proposed that the US fund pro-Western political parties in Iceland. The US Ambassador to Iceland decided against this because the political risks were too high. If the operation had been exposed, the prospects for a military base in Iceland would have been low, owing to, what the Ambassador described as, the fierce nationalism, independence and sensitivity of the Icelanders. The Ambassador noted that it was safer not to deceive the Icelanders, but to engage with the Icelanders above the board and trust that they would continue to lean westward.

In case of a coup by Icelandic communists, the US had plans in 1948 to transport troops by air to Iceland to take hold of the airports in Keflavík and Reykjavík. In event of a Soviet invasion, the Americans had plans in 1948 to transport 80,000 soldiers by sea and engage the enemy in combat.

The names of at least ten individuals who worked for the KGB in Iceland during the 1950s and 1960s have been confirmed. Among them is Vasili Mitrokhin who would become a major and senior archivist for the Soviet Union's foreign intelligence service, the First Chief Directorate of the KGB. Also, Oleg Gordievsky who became a KGB colonel, a secret agent of the British Secret Intelligence Service from 1974 to 1985, and later defected to the West. Several KGB officials were arrested for espionage and declared persona non grata in Iceland.

== The End of the Cold War ==
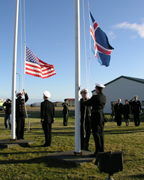
The flag of Iceland being raised and the flag of the United States being lowered as the US hands over the Keflavík Air Base to the Government of Iceland.

By the end of the Cold War, the town of Keflavík on the Reykjanes peninsula had become economically dependent on the US Air Base. Icelandic politicians lobbied US policy-makers, encouraging them to maintain the Icelandic Defense Force, even as Iceland's location ceased to be strategically important following the cessation of hostile rivalry between the United States and the Soviet Union. Despite this, there were a number of protests made by the Icelandic public over the presence of military and Iceland's membership in NATO.

In 2006, the US made the unilateral decision to close the base and withdraw its troops, over the protests of Independence Party and Progressive Party politicians, many of whom felt betrayed by the US military abandonment of Iceland. Under the government of Halldór Ásgrímsson, a diplomatic mission was sent to Washington, D.C. to persuade the US military to stay, but it met with no success.

Iceland remains a member of NATO and is still under the military protection of the United States, even if the economic benefits of the US military presence are gone. With the withdrawal of US forces, the country's military co-operation with other allied NATO countries, such as Norway, has increased.

== Sources ==
- Árni Daníel Júlíusson & Jón Ólafur Ísberg. Íslands sagan í máli og myndum. (Reykjavík: Mál og menning, 2005).
- Gunnar Karlsson. Íslandssaga í stuttu máli. (Reykjavík: Mál og menning, 2000).
- Gunnar Karlsson & Sigurður Ragnarsson. Nýir tímar. Saga Íslands og umheimsins frá lokum 18. aldar til árþúsundamóta. (Reykjavík: Mál og menning, 2006).
