= Naval Air Station Keflavik =

Former U.S. Navy base at Keflavík Airport, Iceland

- Near Reykjanesbær, Southern Peninsula in Iceland
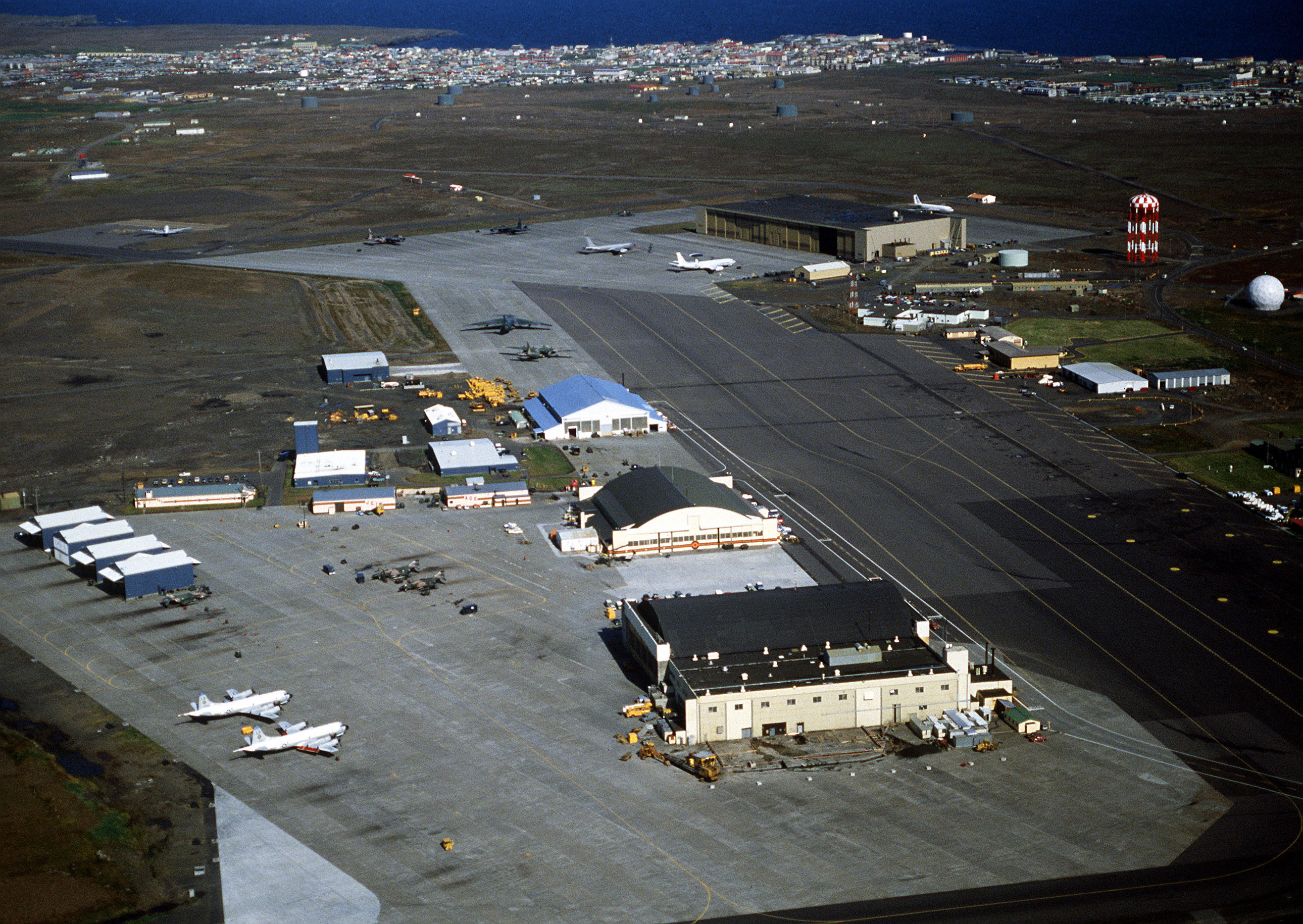
- A view of the U.S. Naval Air Station Keflavik, 19 August 1982.

Site information
- Type: Naval Air Station
- Owner: Icelandic Government
- Operator: United States Navy
- Controlled by: Navy Region Europe, Africa, Central
- Condition: Decommissioned

Location
- Location in Iceland
- Coordinates: 63°59′06″N 22°36′20″W

Site history
- Built: 1951
- In use: 1951 – 2006

Airfield information
- Identifiers: IATA: KEF, ICAO: BIKF, WMO: 040180
- Elevation: 51.5 metres (169 ft) AMSL
Runways
Direction	Length and surface
10/28	3,065 metres (10,056 ft) Asphalt
01/19	3,054 metres (10,020 ft) Asphalt
~~04/22~~	2,042 metres (6,699 ft) Asphalt
~~09/27~~	1,494 metres (4,902 ft) Asphalt
~~18/36~~	1,310 metres (4,298 ft) Asphalt
- Airfield shared with Keflavík International Airport; Source: Iceland Aeronautical Information Publication

Naval Air Station Keflavik (NASKEF) was a United States Navy air station at Keflavík International Airport, Iceland, located on the Reykjanes peninsula on the south-west portion of the island. NASKEF was closed on 8 September 2006 and its facilities were taken over by the Icelandic Defence Agency as their primary base (from 2011 the agency was handed over to the Icelandic Coast Guard). Since decommissioning, the air station site was handed over to the Icelandic government, and has since been redeveloped as housing and commercial development under the Kadeco company.

The base was built during World War II by the United States Army as part of its mission to maintain the defense of Iceland and secure northern Atlantic air routes. It served to ferry personnel, equipment, and supplies to Europe. Intended as a temporary wartime base under an agreement with Iceland and the British, U.S. forces withdrew by 1947 but returned in 1951 as the Iceland Defense Force resident on a North Atlantic Treaty Organization (NATO) base. The base was regularly visited by the American military and other NATO allies for military exercises and other tasks.

Keflavík is no longer a US military base, but it is used periodically by NATO military aircraft from several countries (including the US) for the Icelandic Air Policing operation. In 2017, the US announced its intention to restore hangars at Keflavík to accommodate Boeing P-8 Poseidon patrol aircraft for short stays. There were no plans for US troops to be stationed at Keflavík.

== History ==
=== Background ===
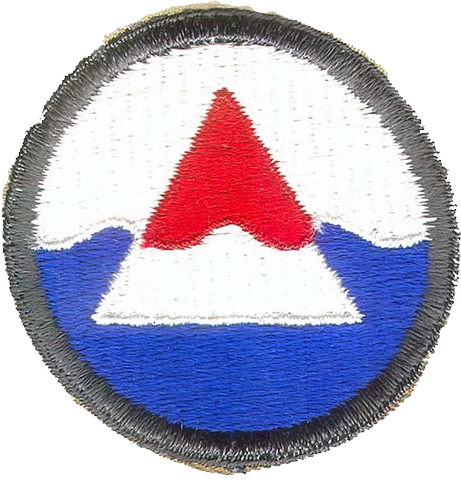
Emblem of the Icelandic Base Command

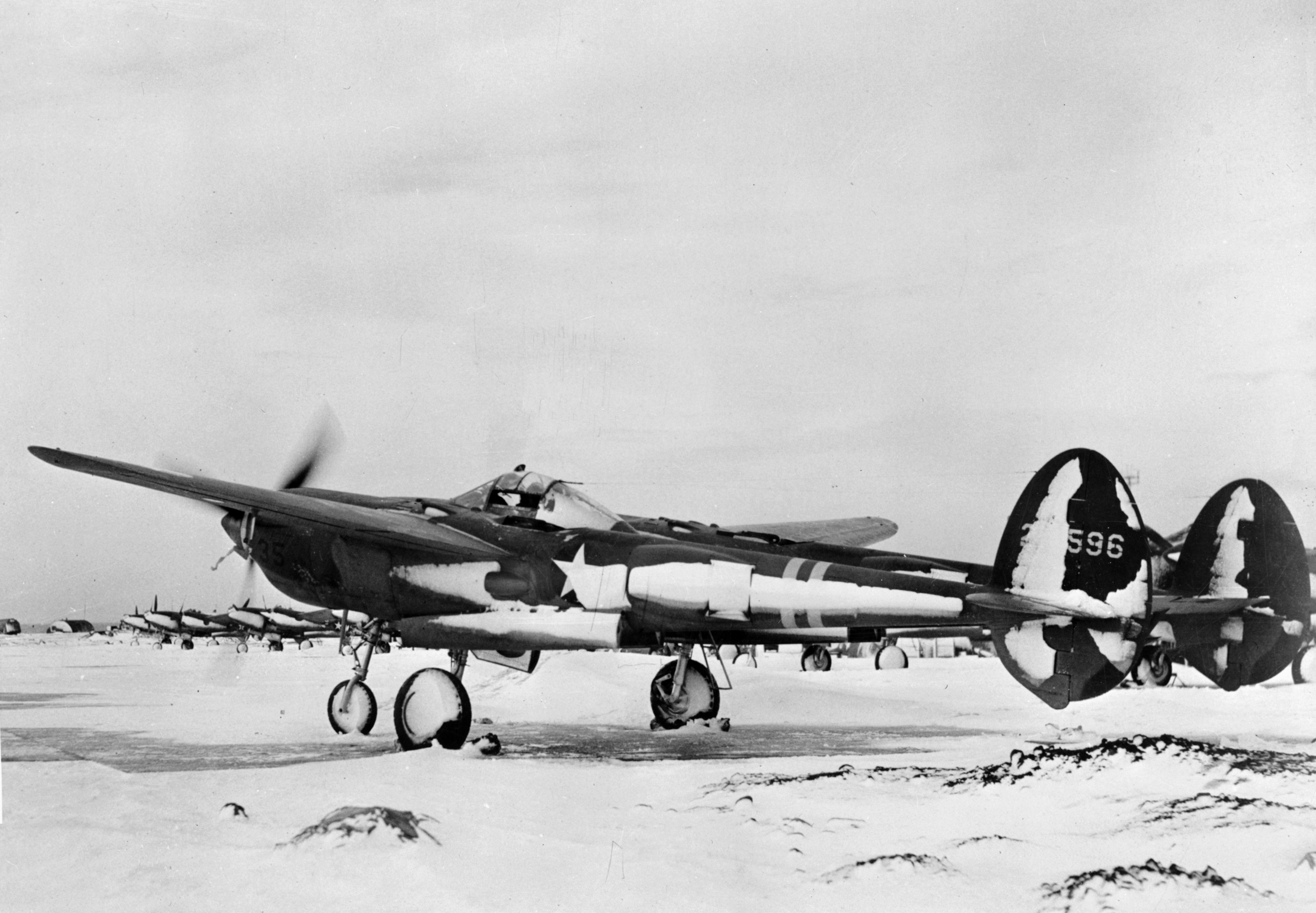
Lockheed P-38F-5-LO Lightning 42-12596 of the 50th Fighter Squadron in Iceland, 1942

After being granted self-governance by Denmark in 1918 with the signing of the 25-year Danish-Icelandic Act of Union, Iceland followed a policy of strict neutrality in international affairs. In 1939, with war imminent in Europe, the German Reich pressed for landing rights for Deutsche Luft Hansa's aircraft for alleged trans-Atlantic flights. The Icelandic government turned them down.

A British request to establish bases in Iceland for the protection of the vital North Atlantic supply lines after German forces occupied Denmark and Norway in April 1940 was also turned down in accordance with the neutrality policy. In response, on 10 May 1940 the people of Reykjavík awoke to the sight of a British invasion force. The government of Iceland protested the invasion but asked the populace to treat the occupying force as guests. This constituted the beginning of the allied occupation of Iceland.

Following talks between British Prime Minister Winston Churchill and President Franklin D. Roosevelt of the United States, Iceland agreed to a tripartite treaty under which United States Marines were to relieve the British garrison in Iceland on the condition that all military forces be withdrawn from Iceland immediately upon the conclusion of the war in Europe. In addition to their defense role, U.S. forces constructed the Keflavik Airport as a refueling point for aircraft deliveries and cargo flights to Europe.

=== Second World War era (1940s) ===
The airport was built by the United States military during World War II, as a replacement for a small British landing strip at Garður to the north. It consisted of two separate two-runway airfields, built simultaneously just 4 km apart. Patterson Field in the south-east opened in 1942 despite being partly incomplete. It was named after a young pilot who died in Iceland. Meeks Field to the north-west opened on 23 March 1943. It was named after another young pilot, George Meeks, who died on the Reykjavík airfield. Patterson Field was closed after the war, but Meeks Field and the adjoining structures were returned to Iceland's control and renamed Naval Air Station Keflavik after the nearby town of Keflavík. In 1951, the U.S. military returned to the airport under a defense agreement between Iceland and the U.S. signed on 5 May 1951.

With the end of the war in Europe, Keflavik Airport became a transit point for aircraft returning from the European Theater of Operations to the United States. With American air activities greatly reduced in Europe in the immediate postwar months, U.S. flying operations were similarly reduced in preparation for transfer of the base to the Icelandic government at the end of 1946. With all noncritical surplus equipment and supplies disposed of, all U.S. air activity ended at the airfield on 11 March 1947.

=== Military Air Transport Service era (1951–1961) ===
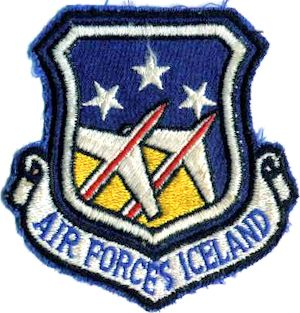
USAF Iceland Emblem

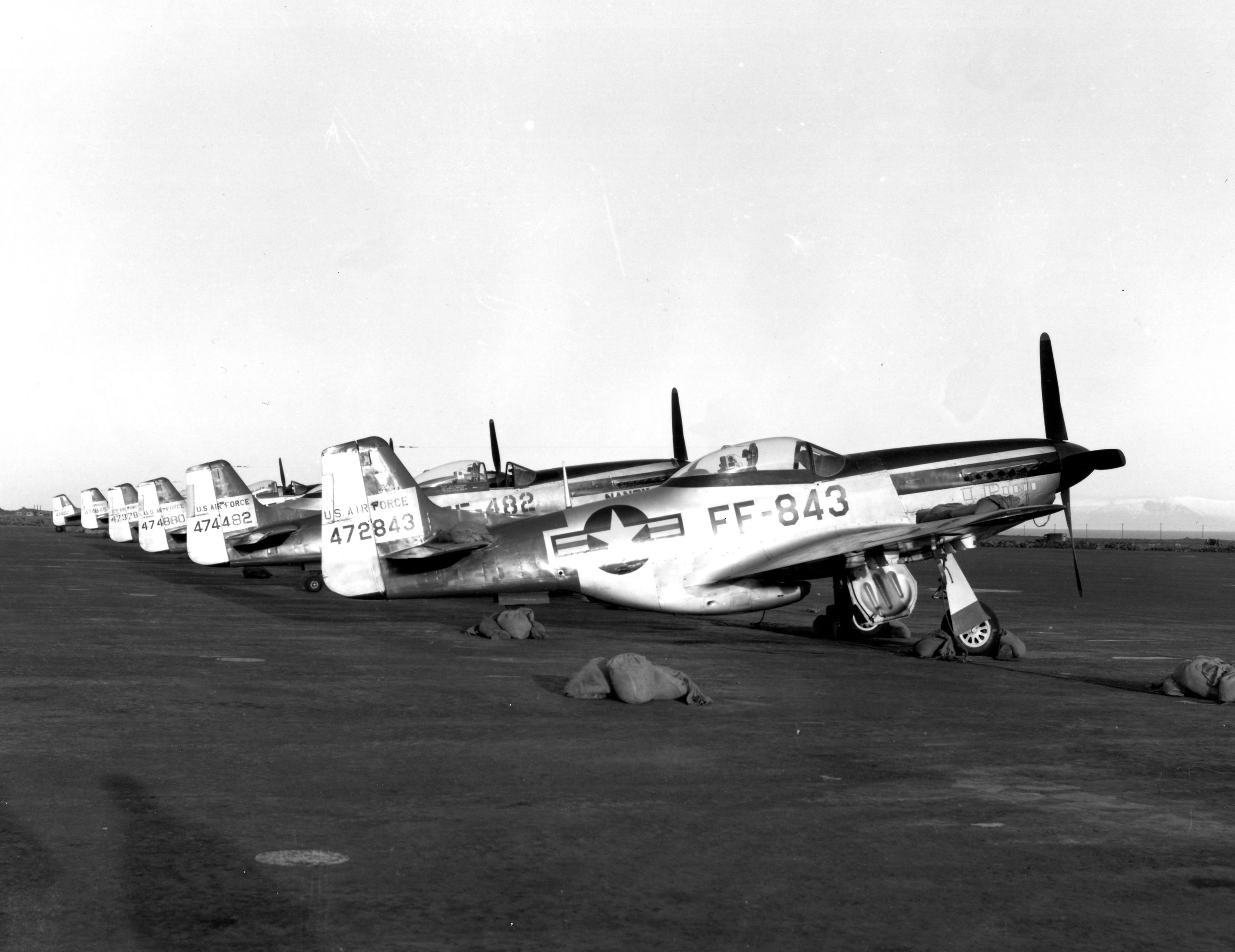
North American F-51D Mustangs of the 192d Fighter-Bomber Squadron (Nevada Air National Guard) stationed at Keflavik 1952-1953

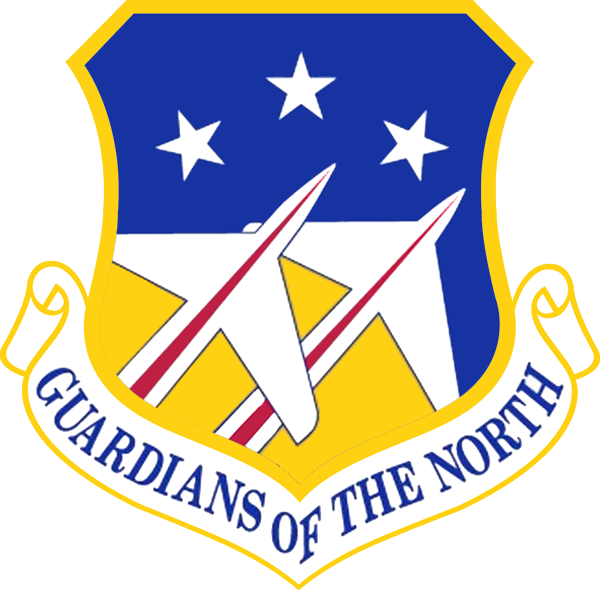
Emblem of the 85th Group

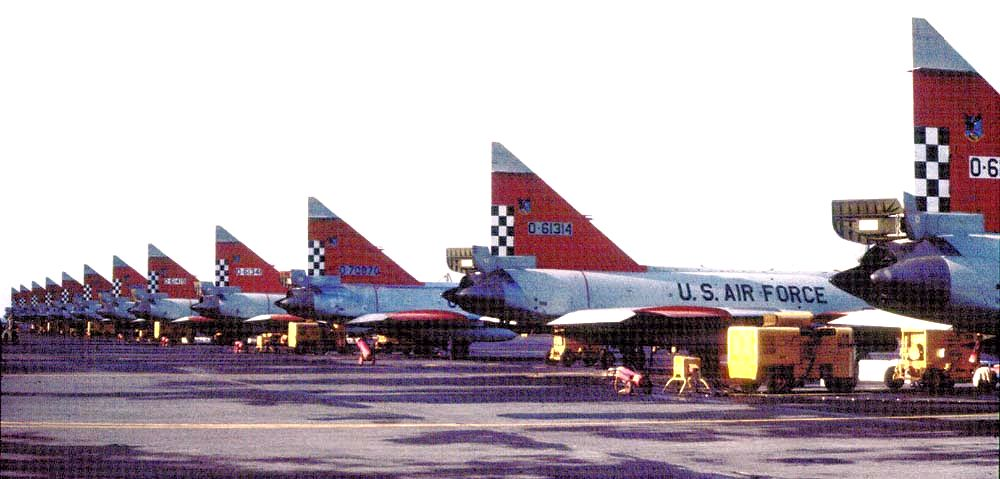
57th Fighter Interceptor Squadron F-102s at Keflavik Airport, 1973

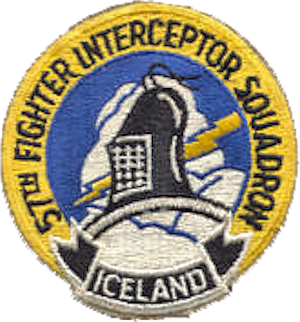
57th Fighter Interceptor Squadron (The Black Knights) Patch

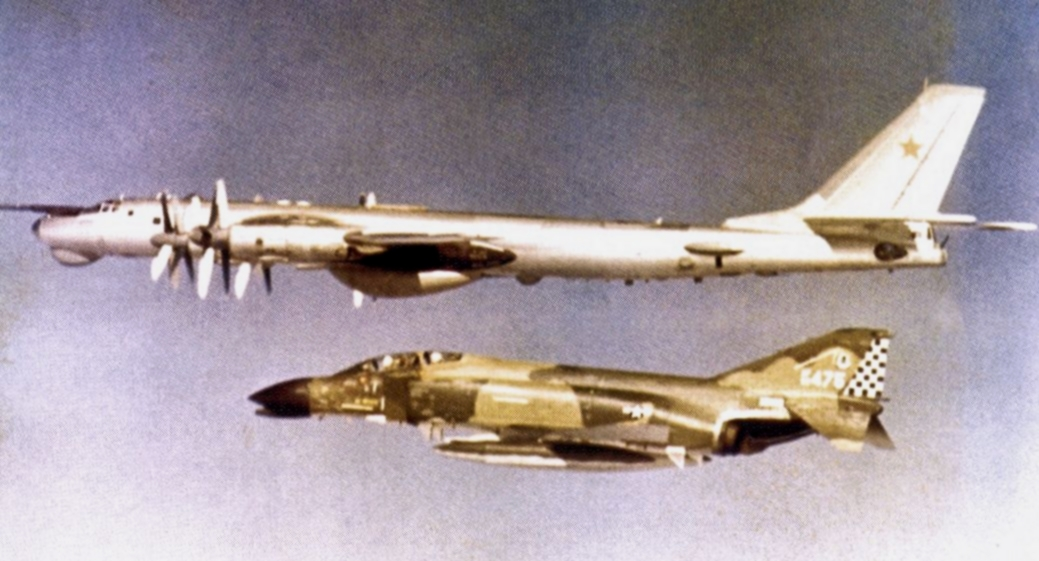
A 57th FIS F-4C with a Soviet Tu-95 Bear in 1973.

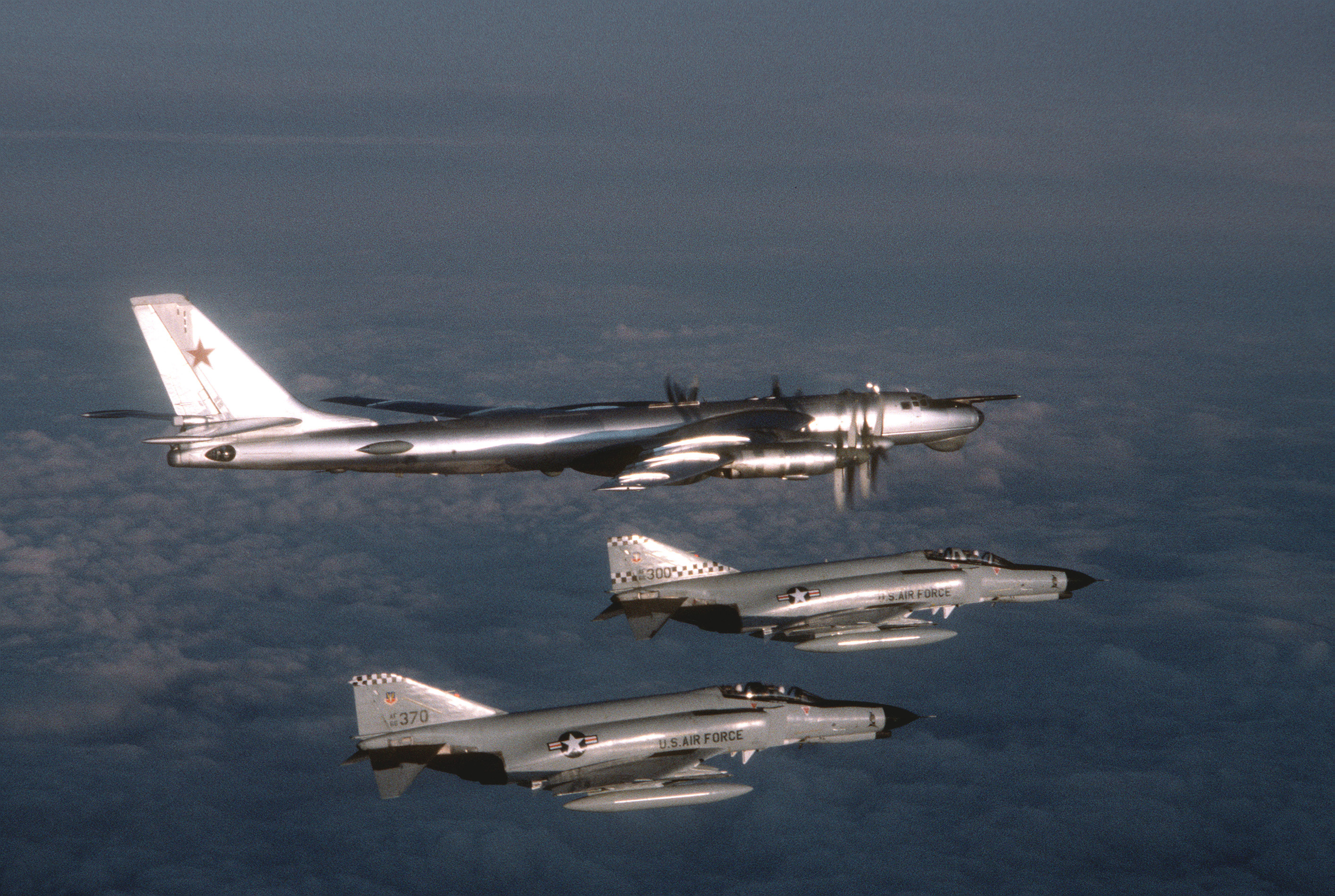
57th FIS F-4Es intercepting a Soviet Tu-95 Bear D in 1980.

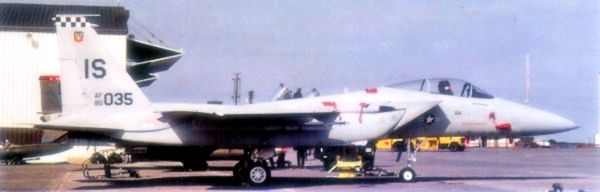
F-15C-28-MC Eagle (s/n 80-0035) of the 57th Fighter Interceptor Squadron, 1986

Another agreement signed between the United States and Iceland in 1946 permitted continued use of the base by the United States. The United States provided all the maintenance and operation of the airport through an American civilian contractor. American Overseas Airlines, followed by Airport Overseas Corporation personnel, operated the military portion of Keflavik Airport after its reversion to Icelandic control at the end of March 1947.

In 1949, Iceland voted to join the North Atlantic Treaty Organization (NATO) among protests about the US militarizing the country, and the base assumed the status of significant strategic importance in the Cold War. Though reluctant to sanction the stationing of foreign troops in significant numbers on their soil, Icelandic officials decided in light of the fact they had no standing army to speak of, that membership in NATO alone was not a sufficient defense; and at the request of NATO, Iceland entered into a defense agreement with the United States directly. This was the beginning of the Iceland Defense Force. Over the next four decades, the Defense Force was "at the front" of the Cold War and was credited with playing a significant role in deterrence.

On 25 May 1951 the United States Air Force (USAF) reestablished its presence at Keflavik Airport with the stationing of the 1400th Air Base Group. Jurisdiction of the airport was assumed by Military Air Transport Service (MATS). MATS re-established a military air terminal and refueling point for trans-Atlantic air service between the United States and Europe at Keflavik. MATS (later Military Airlift Command and Air Mobility Command) units remained at the airport until the withdrawal of United States military units from Iceland in 2006.

During 1947–51, while the base was operated by a U.S. civilian contractor company most of the World War II temporary structures were left empty and became badly deteriorated. The airfield complex, one of the largest in the world during the war, also required upgrading to accommodate modern aircraft. The contractor had extended one runway, constructed a new passenger terminal and hotel building, one aircraft hangar, a hospital, housing units and other facilities for the staff. But this was insufficient for the new Defense Force, so additional facilities had to be provided quickly. A crash reconstruction program was initiated and temporary housing was erected during the construction of permanent housing. The airfield was extended by the Nello L. Teer Company and two new aircraft hangars were constructed. Most of this work was completed by 1957.

Soon after the return of U.S. forces to Keflavik. Air Defense Command (ADC) established a temporary radar station at the airport, equipped with World War II-era AN/TPS-1 and AN/TPS-3A radars that operated until a permanent radar station could be constructed at nearby Rockville AS.

Between 1952 and 2006, Air Forces Iceland provided air defense for Iceland, operated Keflavik Airport, and furnished base support for all U.S. military forces in Iceland participating in its defense under NATO. Also Air Force component of NATO Iceland Defense Force.

ADC, later renamed Aerospace Defense Command used the facility for air surveillance of Iceland and the North Atlantic, employing F-102 Delta Dagger and then F-4C Phantom II fighters as interceptors. Over 1,000 intercepts of Soviet aircraft took place inside Iceland's military air defense identification zone (ADIZ).

=== US Navy era (1960s–2000s) ===
The United States Navy assumed the responsibility of running the air station from MATS in 1961.

In 1974, the left-wing Government of Iceland's new proposal to close the base triggered a petition that garnered 55,000 signatures, about a quarter of the population of the entire nation. This led to the ruling coalition collapsing and the 1974 Icelandic parliamentary election being held.

NAVFAC Keflavik, located some 10 km (6 mi) from NASKEF, was a known main monitoring site of the SOSUS submarine detection network. Submarine cables emanated from NAVFAC Keflavik to the Faroe Islands and Greenland to monitor the GIUK gap, including from Hofn Air Station. The system was inaugurated in 1966 and decommissioned in 1996.

==== Distant Early Warning line (DYE Sites) and tropospheric systems ====
Keflavik was also a part of Distant Early Warning Line (DEW) as an entry point of communications. Rockville Air Station, some 7 km (5 mi) from NASKEF was a radar monitoring facility and tropospheric scatter communications site.

In 1966, a separate facility at NAVFAC Keflavik would be established as DYE-5, as the entry point for DEW communications with a larger tropospheric scatter antenna system as part of the North Atlantic Radio System (NAVFAC KEF known as Site 41), later part of transatlantic section of the ACE High System.

The tropospheric antennas at NAVFAC Keflavik connected to DYE-4 at Kulusuk and Hofn Air Station (Site 42) to Sornafelli (Site 43), Faroe Islands.

=== 1970–2000s ===
On 1 October 1979 Tactical Air Command (TAC) absorbed ADC's assets, and the F-4E Phantom II aircraft of the 57th Fighter Interceptor Squadron (57 FIS). In July 1985, F-15Cs and F-15Ds replaced the aging F-4s, and the tail code "IS" was assigned to Air Forces Iceland (AFI).

During the height of the Cold War in the 1980s, Keflavik also hosted rotational E-3 Sentry AWACS aircraft and KC-135 Stratotanker aircraft from CONUS to support the air defense mission and rotational HC-130 Hercules aircraft from RAF Woodbridge from the 67th Aerospace Rescue and Recovery Squadron to support their detachment of Keflavik-based HH-3 Jolly Green Giant and later HH-60G Pave Hawk helicopters in their search and rescue mission.

Beginning in 1984, the 932d Air Control Squadron established a Radar Operations Control Center at Keflavik which coordinated the 57th FIS interceptors to contacts passing through the GIUK gap. It received long-range radar inputs from five radar sites: the four sites in Iceland plus a data-tie from the Tórshavn AS radar in the Faroe Islands. Tórshavn was located atop mount Sornfelli. The ROCC remained active until the turnover of the facility in 2006.

Air Forces Iceland continued the air defense mission of Iceland as a tenant organization at Keflavik. Under ADC until 1979 and under TAC until 1992. On 1 June 1992, Air Combat Command (ACC) assumed command and control of AFI and the 57 FIS. Less than a year later, the 57 FIS was redesignated as the 57 Fighter Squadron (57 FS) and reassigned to the 35th Fighter Wing that was transferred from the closing George AFB, California.

On 1 October 1994, the 35th Wing was inactivated at Keflavik and reactivated that same day at Misawa Air Base in Misawa, Japan. The 35th Wing was replaced by the newly activated 85th Wing. On 1 March 1995, the 57th FS was inactivated and the interceptor force was replaced by Regular Air Force and Air National Guard F-15 Eagle fighter aircraft rotating every 90 days to Iceland until the USAF inactivated the 85th Group in 2002. United States Air Forces in Europe (USAFE) took over ACC responsibilities at Keflavik on 1 October 2002 as part of a larger restructuring of the unified commands.

The 85th was reduced to a Group level and supported rotational deployments. The 85th Group continued to support rotational deployments until it was inactivated during a ceremony on 28 June 2006, as a result of the USAF reduction in forces in Iceland. All rotational fighters left and the 56th Rescue Squadron ceased operation at the end of the fiscal year.

=== Deactivation and post-military use (2006–2015) ===
On 15 March 2006, the U.S. ambassador to Iceland announced that the United States had decided to substantially reduce the size of the Iceland Defense Force.

During a six-month transition to reduce the military presence in Iceland, most facilities closed and most of the service members departed, leaving behind a core team of active duty and Reserve personnel to finish the job.

By mid-July 2006, many of the military spouses and military active duty staff had transferred.

On 8 September 2006, NASKEF's last commanding officer, Capt. Mark S. Laughton, presided over a ceremony effecting the disestablishment of the air station.

On 26 October the government of Iceland established the Keflavik Airport Development Corporation or Kadeco which was given the task of converting those portions of the base no longer needed into civilian use. The former main base area of NASKEF has since 2006 been redeveloped as residential housing and commercial properties by Kadeco, and are therefore not part of reactivated military activities. New military activities are not in the same area or facilities as NASKEF originally was, and not comparable to its original role.

In January 2010, Verne Holdings announced that it had received equity funding from the Wellcome Trust to build a data center at Keflavik, taking advantage of the available geothermal power and free cooling to minimize its carbon footprint. The datacenter was launched in February 2012.

=== NATO Icelandic Air Policing (2008–present) ===
Since the base closed in 2006, the military areas of Keflavík Airport remain in use under the administration of the Icelandic Coast Guard for NATO.

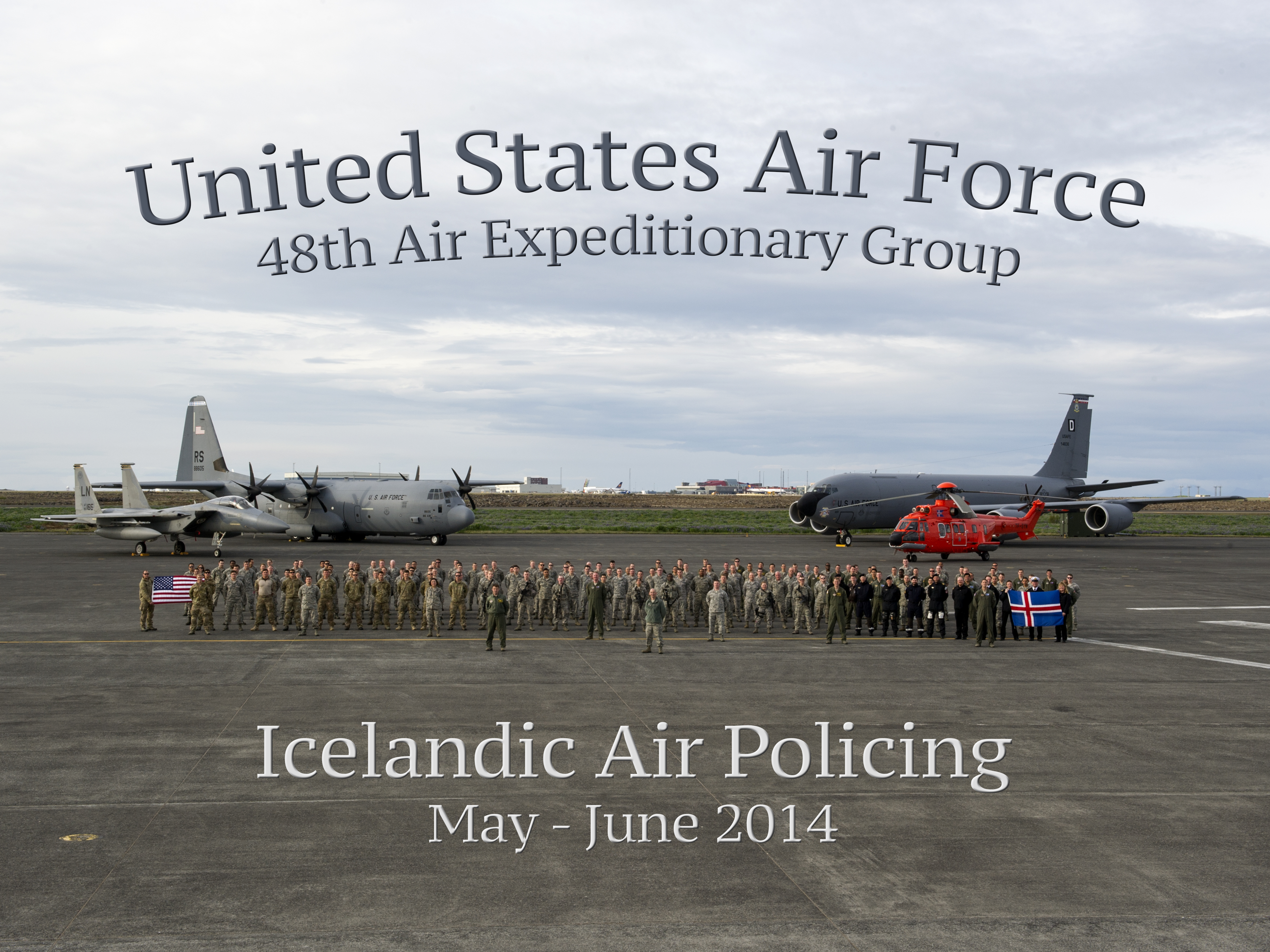
Icelandic Air Policing 2014 (USAFE-AFAFRICA group photo).

As Iceland does not have an air force, in 2006 it requested that its NATO allies periodically deploy aircraft to help protect its airspace. In response, NATO began the Icelandic Air Policing operation in May 2008. As part of this, Keflavík periodically hosts fighter jets, AWACS and maritime patrol aircraft from various NATO countries. The deployments are not continuous; the aircraft are at Keflavík several times each year, which each country taking turns.

In September 2015, news media reported US government officials expressed a desire to reopen aspects of the NATO base of Keflavík Airport, to cope with increasing Russian military activity around Iceland.

In 2016, the US Navy announced that it would provide funding to restore a hangar at the former base to accommodate P-8 Poseidon maritime patrol aircraft, and said it was interested in deploying the aircraft to Iceland for short durations, as needed.

In August–September 2021, US B-2 Spirit stealth bombers briefly stayed at Keflavík during a Bomber Task Force training mission in Europe.

== Station names ==
- Reykjavik Administrative Area, 6 August 1941
- Meeks Field, 1 July 1942
- Keflavik Airport*, 25 October 1946 – 28 June 2006

Under United States Navy Jurisdiction, 1 July 1961 – 28 June 2006

.* United States Air Forces units changed from host to tenant status on 1 July 1961, when the U.S. Navy gained jurisdiction; the installation was renamed U.S. Naval Station Keflavik; Keflavik Airport became one of its tenants.

== Major Army and Air Force Commands ==
- Iceland Base Command, United States Army, February 1942
- European Theater of Operations, United States Army, 10 June 1942
- Eastern Defense Command, United States Army, 30 July 1944
- Air Transport Command, United States Army, 1 January 1946 – 7 April 1947. Returned to control of Icelandic Government on 7 April 1947;
- Joint Task Force No. 109, 7 May 1951, returned to joint Icelandic-USAF control, 23 May 1951.
- Iceland Defense Force, 6 July 1951
- Military Air Transport Service, 1 September 1951. Base transferred to U.S. Navy control and USAF operated in a tenant status only from 1 July 1961;
- Air Defense Command, 1 July 1962

Re-designated Aerospace Defense Command, 15 January 1968

- Tactical Air Command, 1 October 1979
- Air Combat Command, 1 June 1992
- United States Air Forces in Europe, 1 October 1992 – 28 June 2006

=== Major USAF units assigned ===
- 14th Detachment, North Atlantic Wing, Air Transport Command (ATC Station #14), 28 August 1943 – 1 August 1944
- Iceland Base Command, 16 June 1942 – 24 March 1947
- 342d Composite Group, 11 September 1942 – 18 March 1944
- 386th Army Air Force Base Unit, 1 August 1944 – 18 February 1946
- 1400th Air Base Group, 23 May 1951 – 1 July 1960
- 932d Aircraft Control and Warning Squadron (ADC), 1 October 1952 – 1 August 1957
- 192d Fighter-Bomber Squadron, 1 September 1952 – 1 December 1952 (F-51D/H)
- 435th Fighter-Bomber Squadron, 1 December 1952 – 27 March 1953 (F-51D/H)
- 436th Fighter-Bomber Squadron, 1 December 1952 – 2 December 1953 (F-51D/H)
- 53d Air Rescue Squadron, 14 November 1952 – 24 March 1960
- 82d Fighter-Interceptor Squadron, 1 April 1953 – 22 October 1954 (F-94B)
- 57th Fighter-Interceptor Squadron*, 12 November 1954 – 1 March 1995
- Iceland Air Defense Force, 1 April 1952

Re-designated Air Forces Iceland, 1 January 1960
Re-designated 85th Tactical Fighter Wing, 31 July 1985 – 31 May 1993
Re-designated 85th Wing, 29 September 1994
Re-designated 85th Group, 1 July 1995 – 28 June 2006.

- 667th Aircraft Control and Warning Squadron, 8 August 1956 – 16 April 1957
- 934th Aircraft Control and Warning Squadron, 8 September 1956 – 30 May 1957
- 960th Airborne Warning and Control Squadron, 1 Jan 1979 - 1 Jul 1992
- 35th Wing, 1 June 1992 – 1 October 2002, F-15C/D Eagle
- 56th Rescue Squadron: 1 July 1995 – 28 June 2006
- 86th Airlift Wing*, 1 October 2002 – 8 October 2004, F-15C/D Eagle
- 48th Fighter Wing**, 8 October 2004 – 28 June 2006, F-15C/D Eagle

.* Rotational TDY flights of aircraft from various squadrons of 52d Operations Group, Spangdahlem AB, Germany
.** Rotational TDY flights of aircraft from 48th Operations Group, RAF Lakenheath, United Kingdom

== Operations ==
Naval Air Station Keflavik was the host command for all U.S. defense activities in Iceland. The major commands stationed on the base were the USAF's 85th Group, Fleet Air Keflavik, the headquarters of the U.S.-provided Iceland Defense Force, Naval Computer and Telecommunications Station Keflavik, U.S. Naval Hospital Keflavik and the Sound Surveillance System (SOSUS) shore terminal at Naval Facility (NAVFAC) Keflavik. The positions of Commander, Fleet Air Keflavik and Commander, Iceland Defence Force were held by the same U.S. Navy rear admiral. There were more than 25 different commands of various sizes and personnel from the U.S. Army, U.S. Navy, U.S. Air Force, U.S. Marine Corps, and U.S. Coast Guard in Iceland. Also present were representatives from Canada, the Netherlands, Norway, and Denmark.

NASKEF was responsible for providing all support facilities, including the runways, housing, supply and recreational facilities. The primary mission of Naval Air Station Keflavik was to maintain and operate facilities and provide services and material to support operations of aviation activities and units of the operating forces of the Navy and other activities and units, as designated by the Chief of Naval Operations.

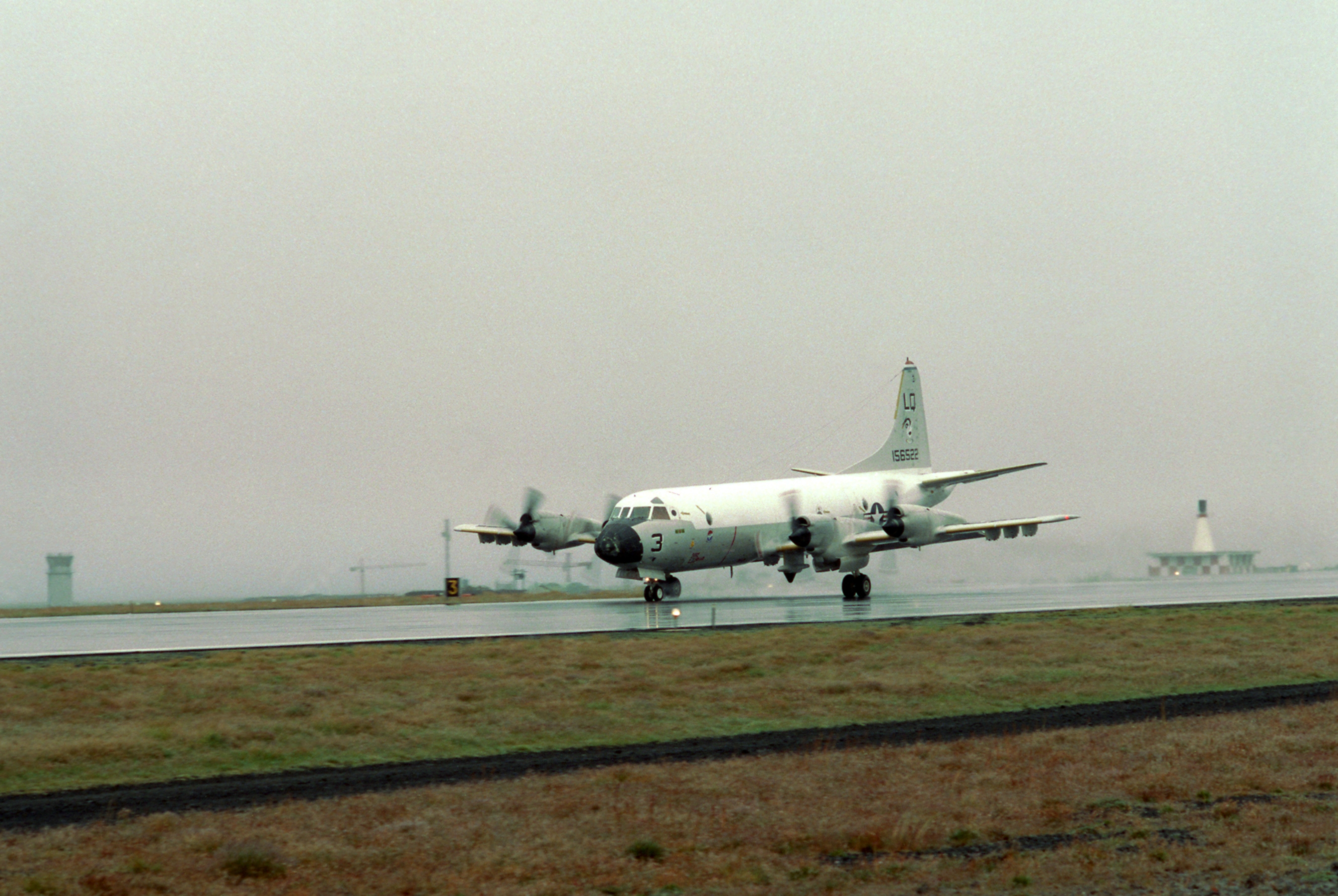
A U.S. Navy P-3C Orion of Patrol Squadron 56 (VP-56) at Keflavik, 1977.

U.S. Navy use of the facility allowed the housing of rotational P-3 Orion squadrons, aircraft, flight crews, maintenance and administrative support personnel from their CONUS home bases for six-month deployments in support of antisubmarine warfare and maritime patrol missions until 2004. As a NATO mission, the U.S. Navy P-3s were frequently augmented by U.S. Navy Reserve P-3 squadrons and detachments of Canadian Forces CP-140 Aurora, Royal Netherlands Navy P-3, German Navy Breguet Atlantique and Royal Air Force Hawker Siddeley Nimrod MR2 maritime patrol aircraft.

Army National Guard units and Interim Marine Security Forces stormed the lava fields surrounding the base during training exercises such as Northern Viking.

NAS Keflavik employed approximately 900 Icelandic civilians who worked with military personnel, providing the services necessary to operate the base. Twenty-four hours a day, seven days a week, the airfield was available for maritime patrol activities, air defense and for transiting aircraft between North America and Europe, in addition to supporting Iceland's international civilian aviation.

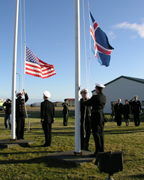
The flag of Iceland being raised and the flag of the US being lowered as the US hands over the Naval Air Station to the Government of Iceland

The NATO base did not have a Status of Forces Agreement (SOFA) with the Icelandic Government and the base lacked the roadway entrance security gates characteristic of most military installations, having only Icelandic Customs officials instead. Icelandic nationals had unrestricted access to most of the base, especially since the civilian international airport terminal was also located on the base at the time. Icelandic nationals were only barred from actual security-restricted military facilities such as aircraft parking areas, squadron and hangar facilities and classified operations centers. During the height of the Cold War, this access situation created definitive operational security (OPSEC) concerns by U.S. and NATO officials due to potential espionage activities by Soviet operatives masquerading as Icelandic nationals. In addition, during this same time period, the former Soviet Union constructed one of their largest embassy facilities in the nearby capital, Reykjavik, which doubled as a diplomatic cover for intelligence collection activities against U.S. and NATO military forces. Access to the base was restricted to authorized military and civilian personnel after the construction of a new civilian passenger terminal on the opposite side of the airfield in the mid-1980s.

The base offered a wide variety of recreational services which included bowling, swimming, gymnasium, theater, social clubs, a Wendy's restaurant, and hobby centers. Other services included a Navy Exchange, commissary, bank, credit union, hospital, beauty shop, tour office and morale flights to the rest of Europe and the United States. Golfing was available in a nearby community.

The American base staff had their own names for various places in Iceland, e.g., "Kef" for Keflavík and "Hurdygurdy" for Hveragerði.

== Naval Facility (NAVFAC) Keflavik ==
63°57′13.4″N 22°42′23.5″W

Naval Facility Keflavik.

NAVFAC Keflavik truck with facility emblem, air station parade 1993.

The 1965 decision to deploy the Sound Surveillance System to the Norwegian Sea was followed by establishment of Naval Facility Keflavik in which output of the array at sea was processed and displayed by means of the Low Frequency Analyzer and Recorder (LOFAR). In 1966 the first deployment of a 3 X 16 element array system was terminated at the facility. NAVFAC Keflavik was commissioned 1 March 1966 with nine officers and sixty-nine enlisted personnel, eventually reaching 15 officers and 163 enlisted.

The first detection of Soviet Victor- and Charlie-class submarines was in 1968 with systems terminating at the facility followed by the first detection of a Soviet Delta Class Nuclear submarine in 1974. The first detection of a Soviet nuclear submarine had been by United States Naval Facility, Barbados on 6 July 1962 of a submarine off the coast of Norway as it entered the Greenland-Iceland-United Kingdom (GIUK) gap. Naval Facility Keflavik was decommissioned on 13 December 1996.

== In popular culture ==
NAS Keflavik features prominently in Tom Clancy's 1986 techno-thriller novel Red Storm Rising. NAS Keflavik also features prominently in Icelandic author Arnaldur Indriðason's 1999 mystery thriller Napóleonsskjölin, published in English in 2011 as Operation Napoleon.

== See also ==
- Naval Radio Transmitter Facility Grindavik
- Iceland Defence Force
- Iceland in the Cold War
- Military of Iceland
- 1949 anti-NATO riot in Iceland
