= 932nd Air Control Squadron =

932d Air Control Squadron
- Active: 1952-2006
- Country: United States
- Branch: United States Air Force
- Type: General Radar Surveillance

Insignia
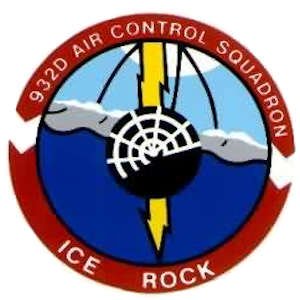
- 932d Air Control Squadron emblem

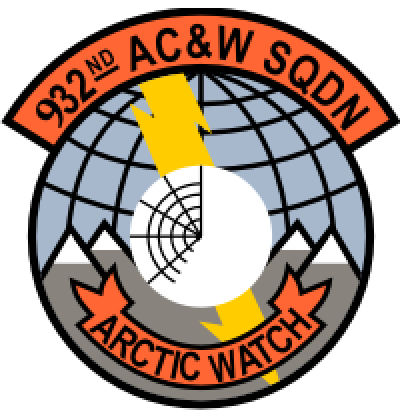
- 932d Aircraft Control & Warning Sq emblem

The 932d Air Control Squadron is an inactive United States Air Force unit. It was last assigned to the 85th Group, Third Air Force, stationed at Keflavik Naval Air Station, Iceland. It was inactivated on 27 June 2006.

From 1952 to 2006, the unit was a General Surveillance Radar Squadron providing for the air defense of Iceland and the North Atlantic.

== Lineage ==
- Constituted as 932d Aircraft Control and Warning Squadron on 28 Apr 1952

Activated on 1 May 1952
Redesignated 932d Air Defense Squadron on 1 Oct 1987
Redesignated 932d Air Control Squadron on 31 May 1993
Inactivated on 27 June 2006

Assignments

- Ninth Air Force, 1 May 1952
- 65th Air Division (Defense), 1 Oct 1952
- Iceland Air Defense Force, 8 Mar 1954
- 1400th Operations Group, 18 Dec 1955
- Air Forces Iceland, 1 July 1960
- 35th Operations Group, 31 May 1993
- 85th Operations Group, 1 Oct 1994
- 85th Group, 1 July 1995 – 28 June 2006

Stations

- Otis Air Force Base, Falmouth, Massachusetts, 1 May 1952
- Keflavik Airport, Iceland, 1 Oct 1952
- Rockville Air Station, Iceland, 1 Aug 1957
- Keflavik Air Station, Iceland, Oct 1997 - 28 June 2006

== Past commanders ==
1. Cpt Thomas H. Galligan, 1 May 1952
2. LTC Ruel M. Luckingham, 26 Jun 1952
3. LTC Allie P. Ash, Jul 1953
4. LTC John C. Peck, Jul 1954
5. LTC Jim R. Tebbs, Jul 1955
6. LTC Edwin L. Murrill, 1 Jul 1956
7. Maj J. Bert Davis, Jul 1957
8. Maj George T. Milonas, Jul 1958
9. Maj Guy B. Hume, 1 Dec 1958
10. Maj Charles F. Carter, 28 Oct 1959
11. Maj Austin W. Simmons, 28 Jul 1960
12. Maj Jack C. Shadeck, Sep 1962
13. LTC William H. Truxal, Sep 1963
14. Cpt Arthur C. Mussman, Jun 1965 (Acting)
15. LTC Victor J. Carlino, 1965
16. LTC Frank J. Pietyka, Aug 1965
17. Maj Victor J. Carlino, Jul 1968
18. LTC Frank J. Pietryka, 24 Jul 1968
19. LTC James H. Wallace, Jul 1970
20. LTC John J. Bayer, Jul 1972
21. LTC Richard M. Overland, Jun 1973
22. LTC James G. Young, 7 Jul 1975
23. LTC Johnnie S. Toniolli, 6 Jul 1977
24. LTC L. Keith Demott, Jul 1979
25. LTC Edward Boardman, 17 Jul 1981
26. LTC Forrest N. Freeman Jr, Jul 1982
27. LTC George H. Gwinn, 8 Jul 1983
28. LTC Waller D. Wieters, 5 Jul 1984
29. LTC Ronald L. Gavette, 5 Jul 1985
30. LTC Dennis W. Shepard, Aug 1986
31. LTC Terry L. Troy, 7 Aug 1987
32. LTC Billy A. Wooley, 7 Aug 1989
33. LTC Lynn R. Wills, 22 Jul 1991
34. LTC Clark P. Wigley, 23 Jul 1993
35. LTC Ray T. Garza, 7 Jul 1995
36. LTC Rex A. Marshall, 31 Jul 1997
37. LTC William A. Schaake, 26 Mar 1999
38. LTC Van Don Kepley, 6 Jul 2001
