= Rockville Air Station =

Former US Air Force radar station

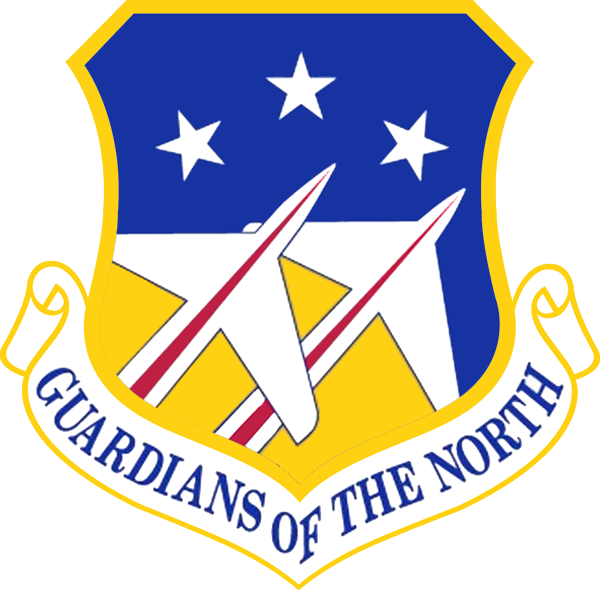
Rockville Air Station
- Part of Air Forces Iceland

Site information
- Type: Air Force Station
- Controlled by: United States Air Force

Location
- Location of Rockville Air Station, Iceland
- Coordinates: 64°02′07″N 022°39′16″W

Site history
- Built: 1951
- In use: 1951-1998

Rockville Air Station (ADC/NATO ID: H-1) was a United States Air Force General Surveillance Radar station. It was located 2.9 miles (4.7 km) west-northwest of the closed Naval Air Station Keflavik Base, Iceland. It was deactivated in 1998.

Its radar coverage constituted part of the eastern extension of the Distant Early Warning Line, connected to DYE-5 at NAVFAC Keflavik.

It was effectively replaced by a new NATO radar facility now known as H-1 Miðnesheiði, which is around 1.4 km (1 mi) south of Rockville, which opened in 1992 as part of the Iceland Air Defence System, which as of 2025 is still active.

== History ==
Rockville Air Station was established in early 1952, although its origins date to a temporary site at Keflavik Airport set up in 1951 to provide radar coverage over the airport. The permanent site was operated by the 932d Aircraft Control and Warning (later Air Defense, Later Air Control) Squadron, and was equipped with AN/TPS-1B; AN/FPS-3; AN/FPS-20 and two AN/FPS-6 height finder radars.

The Greenland, Iceland and United Kingdom air defense sector, better known as the GIUK gap, was routinely utilized by the Soviet Union's long-range heavy bombers and maritime reconnaissance platforms as a transit point towards the Atlantic Ocean. From bases located at Arkhangelsk and Murmansk, Soviet aircraft would stream down to the North Cape in Norway towards the Gap which was use as a doorway to the vast Atlantic. Most of the Soviet missions were destined to probe United States' air defense along the North Atlantic and after 1960 in the Caribbean where Cuba, the Soviet Union's most important satellite state outside continental Europe, was located. Such was the perceived threat from the Soviet incursions that it became a priority for NATO to demonstrate to that the strategic GIUK passage would be monitored at all times.

The mission of the station was to intercept and shadow all Soviet aircraft in transit in and from the Gap which passed through the detection range of its radars and pass the information to interceptor aircraft deployed at Keflavik Airfield. Routine operations continued until 1998 until the site was closed.

After the site was closed, the facility was turned over to the Iceland government which used it for some years as the Byrgid drug rehabilitation facility. Today the site is closed, the radar towers are gone and all buildings have been removed.

== See also ==
- List of USAF Aerospace Defense Command General Surveillance Radar Stations
- Iceland Air Defence System
- Naval Air Station Keflavik
- Distant Early Warning Line
- DYE Stations

== External sources ==
- A Handbook of Aerospace Defense Organization 1946 - 1980, by Lloyd H. Cornett and Mildred W. Johnson, Office of History, Aerospace Defense Center, Peterson Air Force Base, Colorado
- Winkler, David F. (1997), Searching the skies: the legacy of the United States Cold War defense radar program. Prepared for United States Air Force Headquarters Air Combat Command.
- Information for Rockville AS, IS
