= 1949 anti-NATO riot in Iceland =

1949 public protest in Iceland due to Parliament decision to join NATO

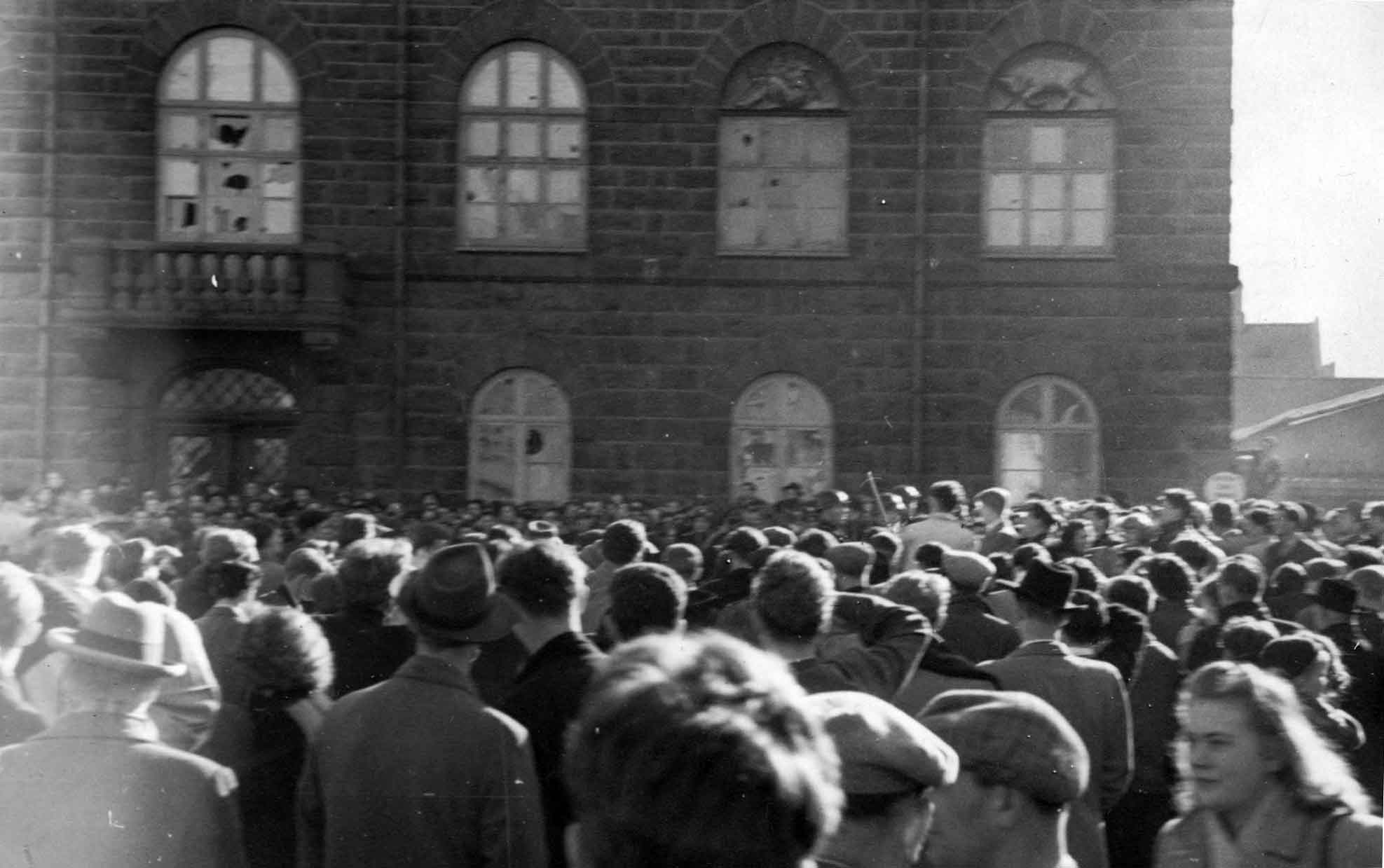
Fighting breaks out between anti- and pro-NATO supporters, and police. The windows of the House of the Althing have been smashed (30 March 1949).

The anti-NATO riot in Iceland of 30 March 1949 was prompted by the decision of the Alþingi, the Icelandic parliament, to join the newly formed NATO, thereby involving Iceland directly in the Cold War, opposing the Soviet Union and re-militarizing the country.

== Protest ==
Several hundred protesters first convened behind a school in the centre of Reykjavík and then marched on Austurvöllur, a small park in front of the parliament building, where a throng of people had already arrived positioning themselves between the parliament and the rioters, intending to defend it.

At first the demonstrators were calm, but when a leading member of the Socialist Party announced over a loudspeaker that the leader of his party was held hostage inside the Parliament building, things became violent.

Rocks and eggs were tossed at the building, some breaking the windows and one narrowly missing the head of the Parliamentary president, until the Reykjavík police force, aided by volunteers from the Independence Party intervened, beating rioters down and eventually launching tear gas grenades at the rioters. It was the first time police in Iceland used tear gas against protesters and the only time until 2009, when police used it during the Icelandic financial crisis protests.

The riot continued also after the conclusion of the vote and lasted for several hours.

== Aftermath ==
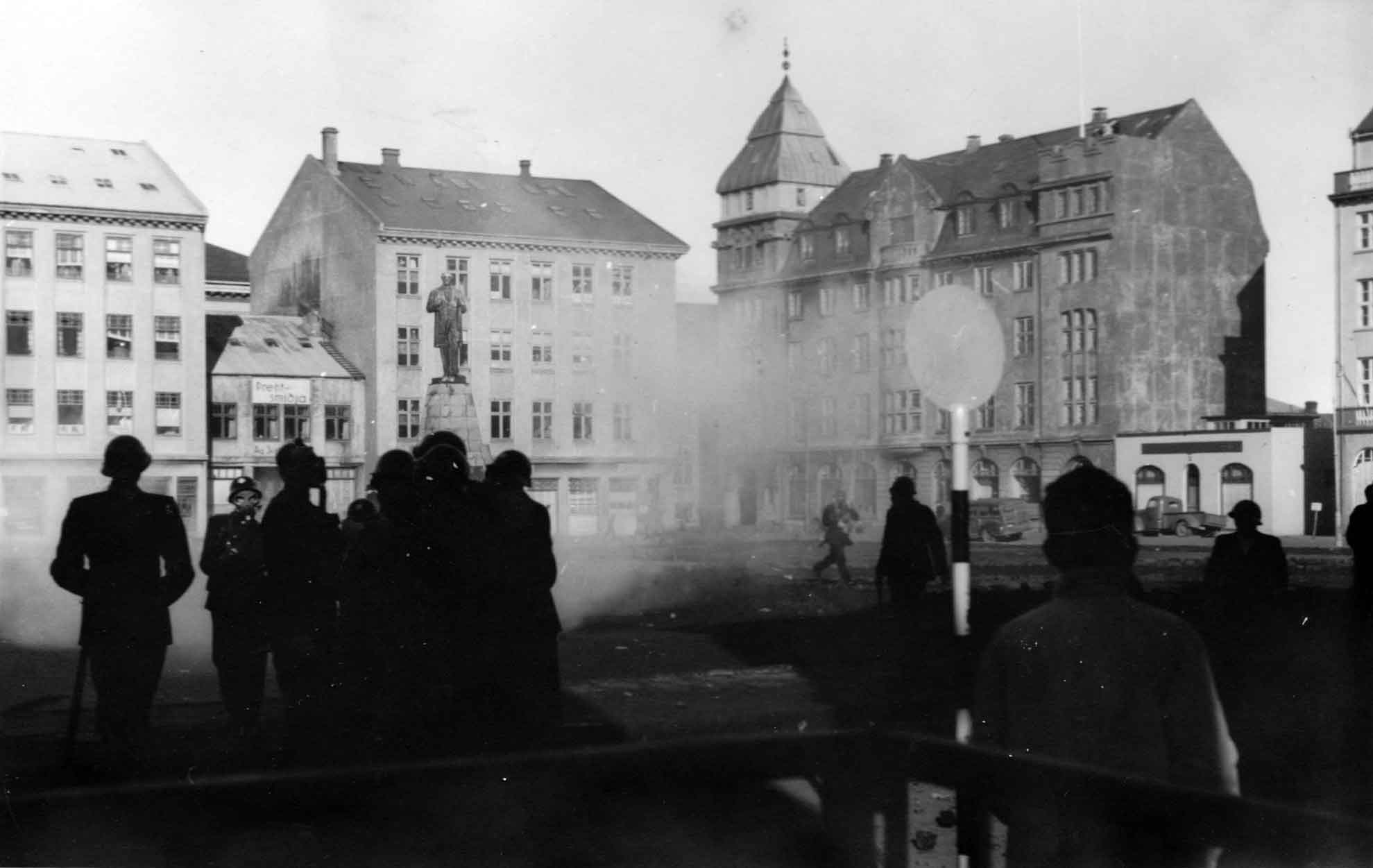
Policemen in gas masks guard Austurvöllur after dispersing the crowd with tear gas

Despite violent opposition, Iceland's membership in NATO was confirmed.

After the event, protests by anti-NATO activists were commonplace. The left parties in the 1950s and 1960s parliamentary elections promised to put an end to the bilateral U.S.-Icelandic Defence Agreement, but dropped these promises after becoming part of the ruling coalitions. The slogan "Iceland out of NATO and the Army out!" ("Ísland úr NATO og herinn burt!") became a part of Icelandic culture. In 1974, the government proposed closing down the Keflavik base, but a petition campaign gathered a quarter of the population's signatures. The government fell out of power, and it was replaced by a decidedly pro-NATO government. On 30 September 2006, the US Navy unilaterally withdrew the last of its military force from Keflavík airport.

In 2016, the United States began preparations to re-establish its presence at the base. In 2017, the United States announced its intention to construct a modern air base on the peninsula.

The protagonist of the novel Angels of the Universe is born during the riot.

== Gallery ==
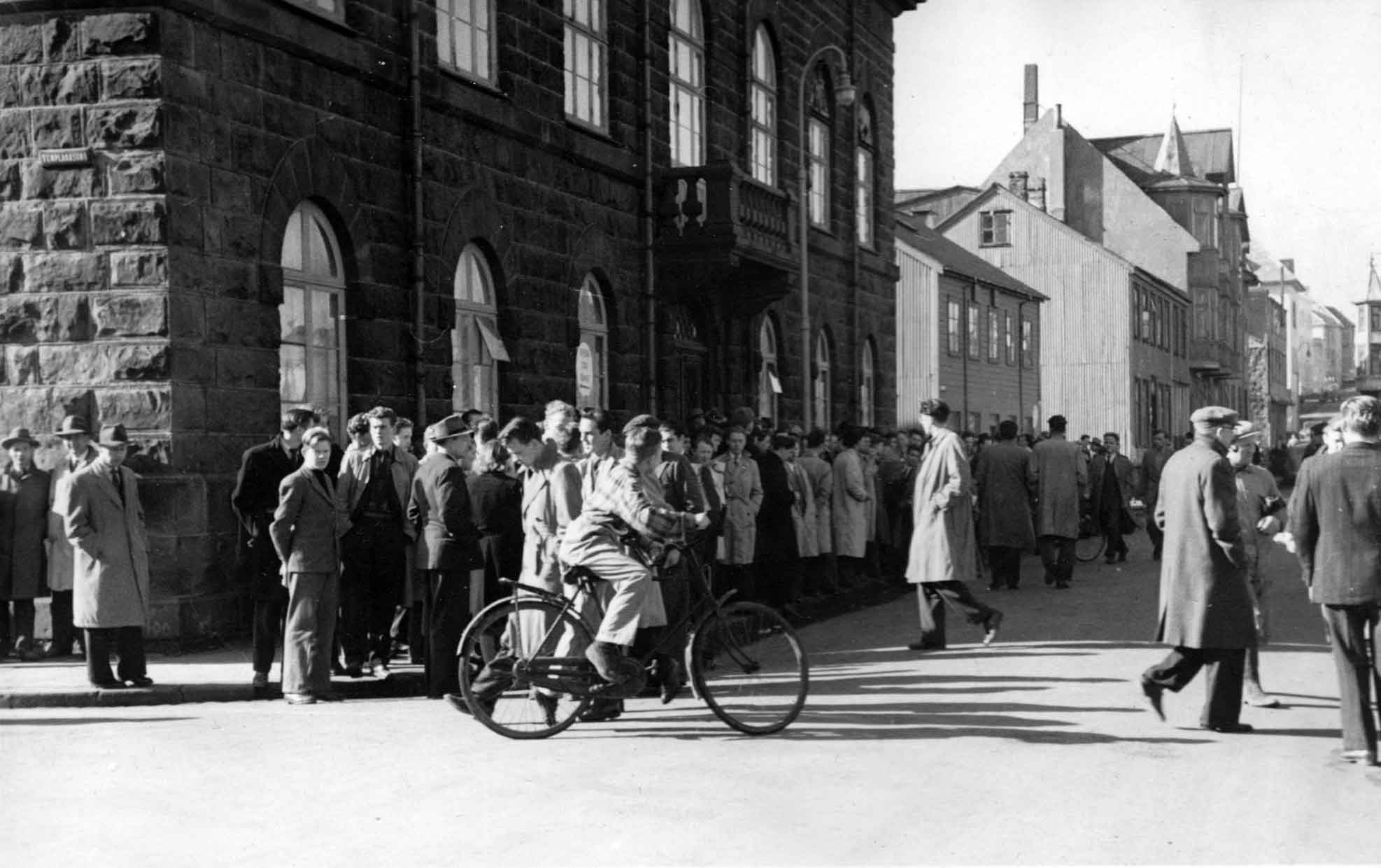
People gather in front of the House of the Althing.

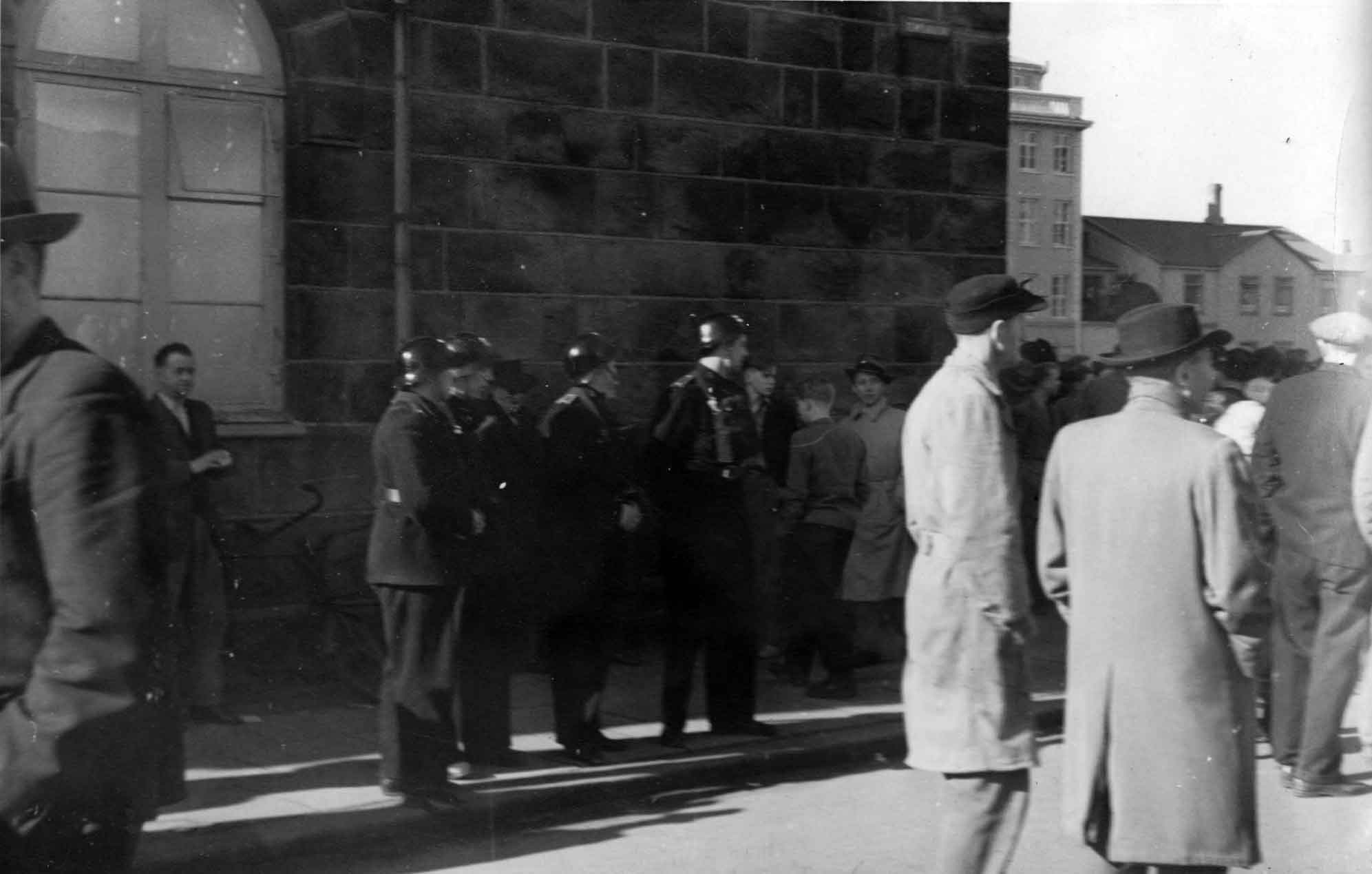
Police are prepared for trouble in front of the House of the Althing.

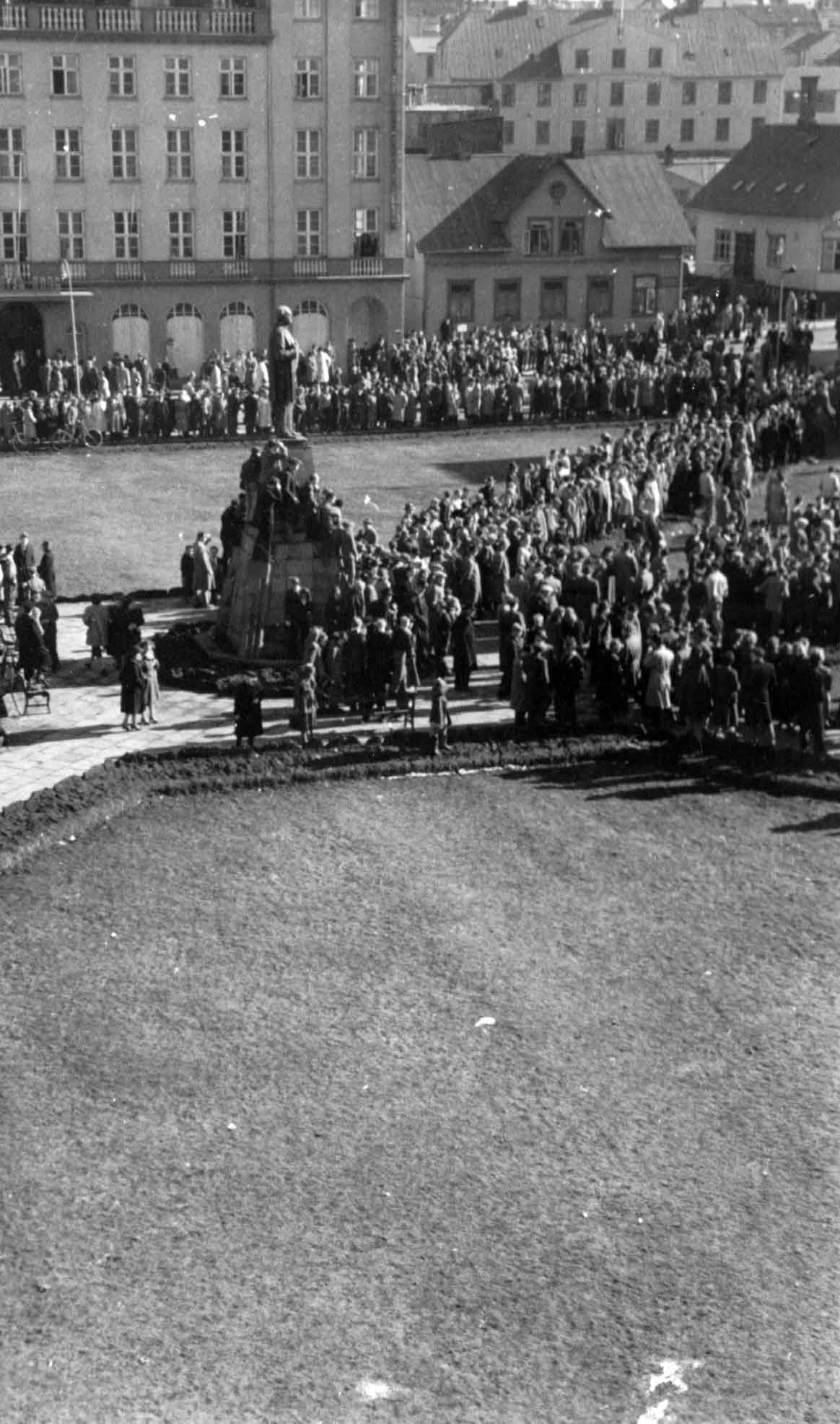
Overview over Austurvöllur, in front of the House of the Althing

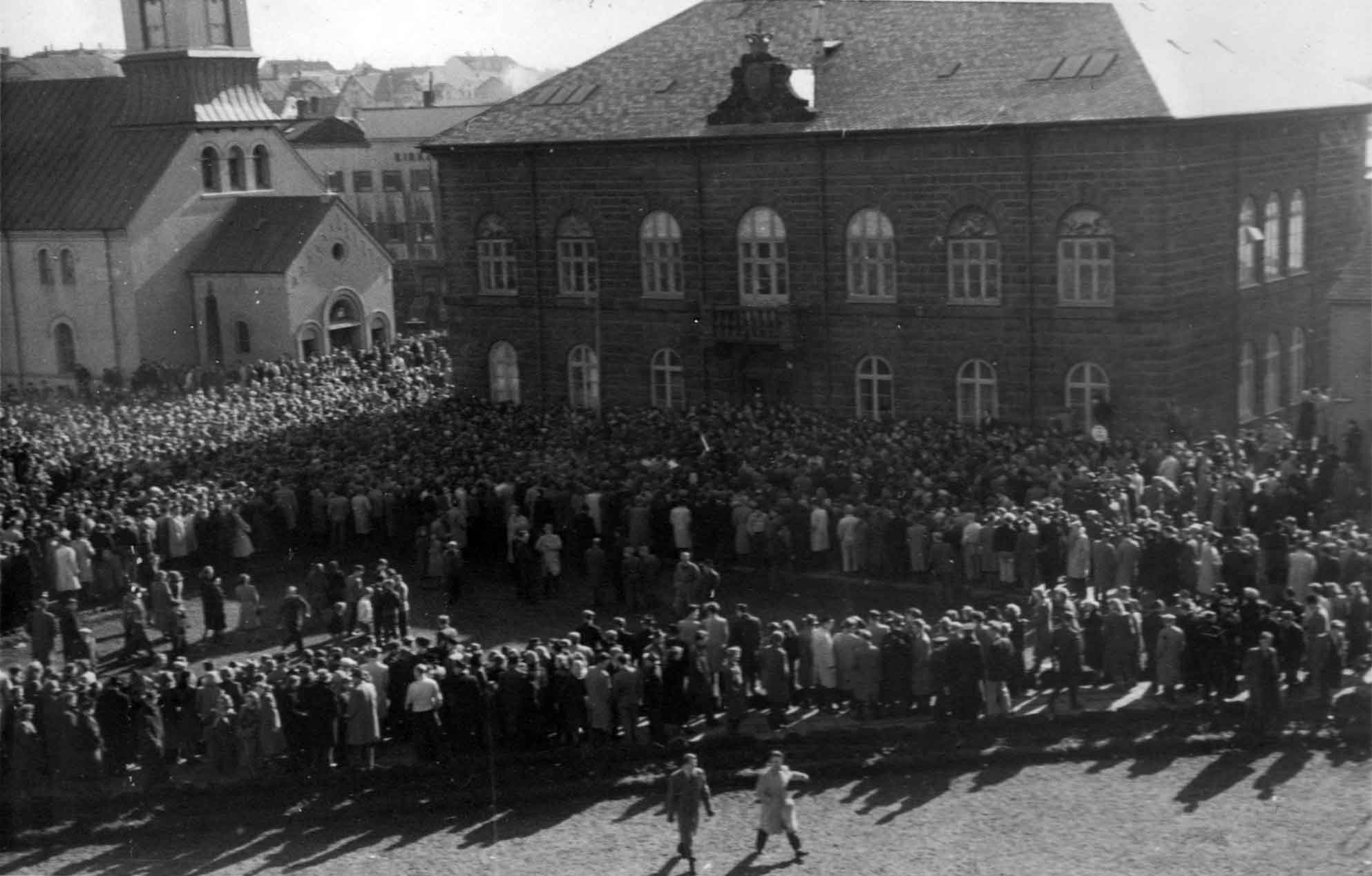
Overview over Austurvöllur and the House of the Althing.

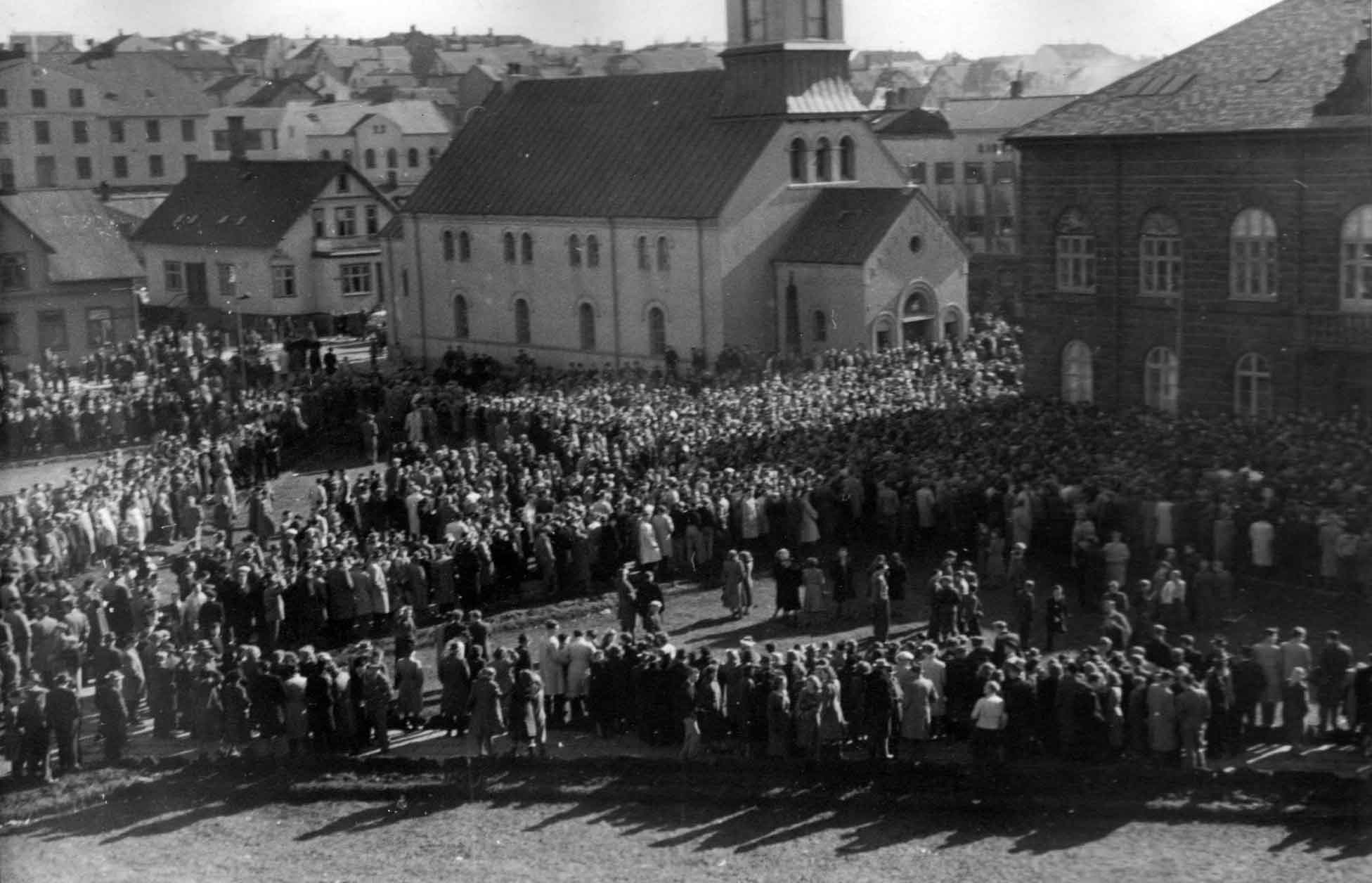
Overview over Austurvöllur, Reykjavik Cathedral and the House of the Althing.

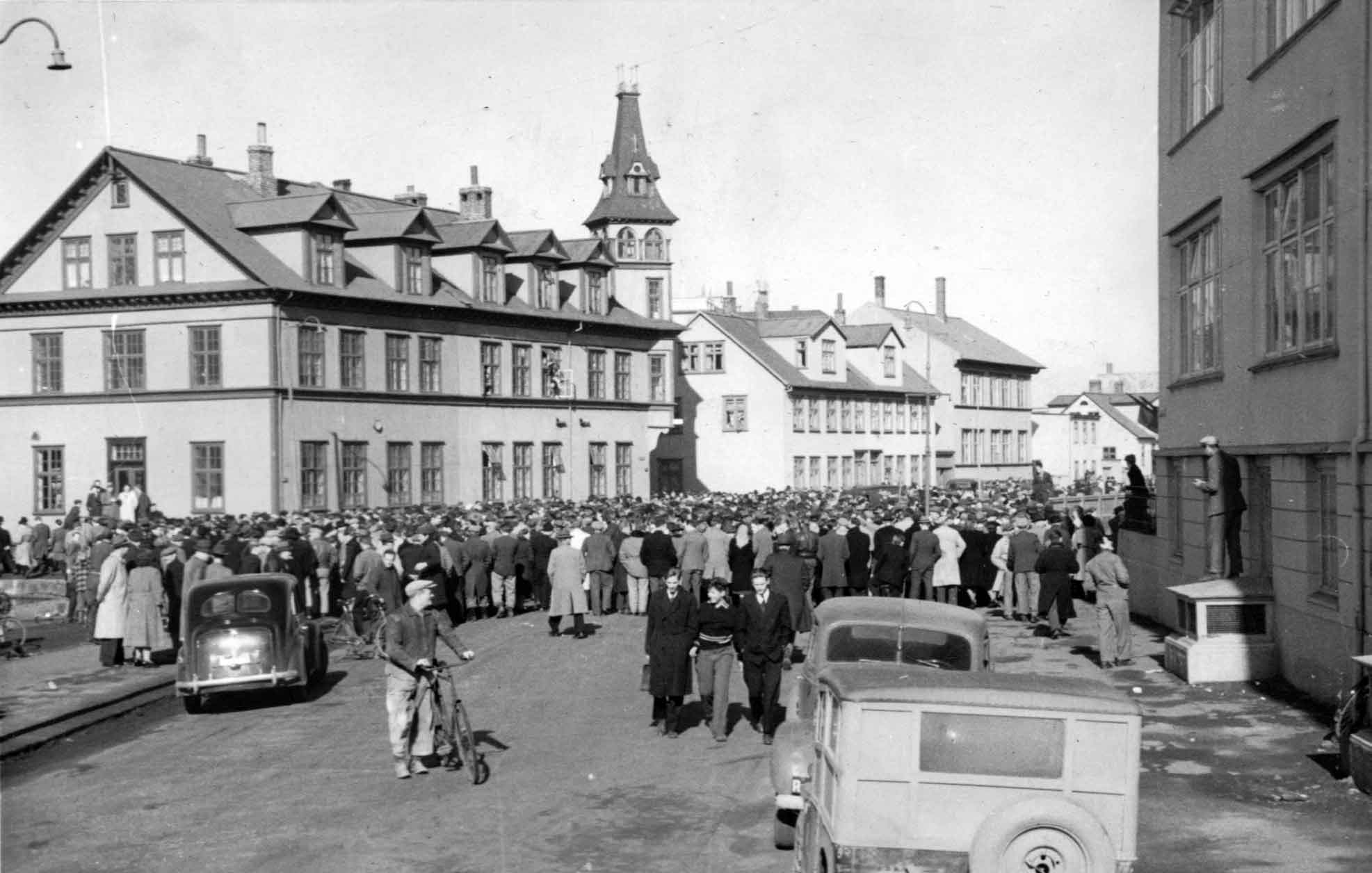
People gather for a meeting at the old school, by Tjörnin in downtown Reykjavik

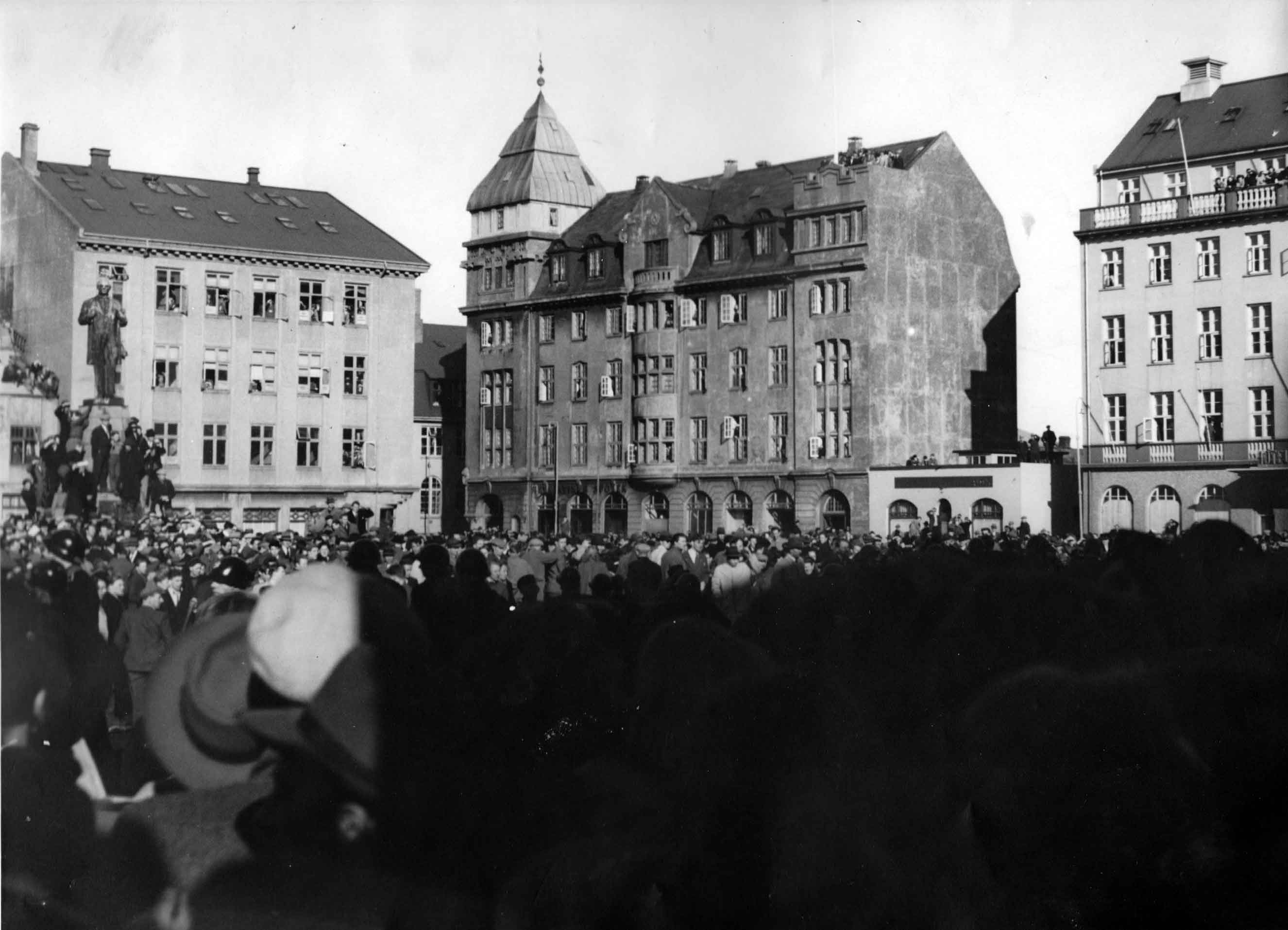
In the throng in front of the House of the Althing during anti-NATO protests.

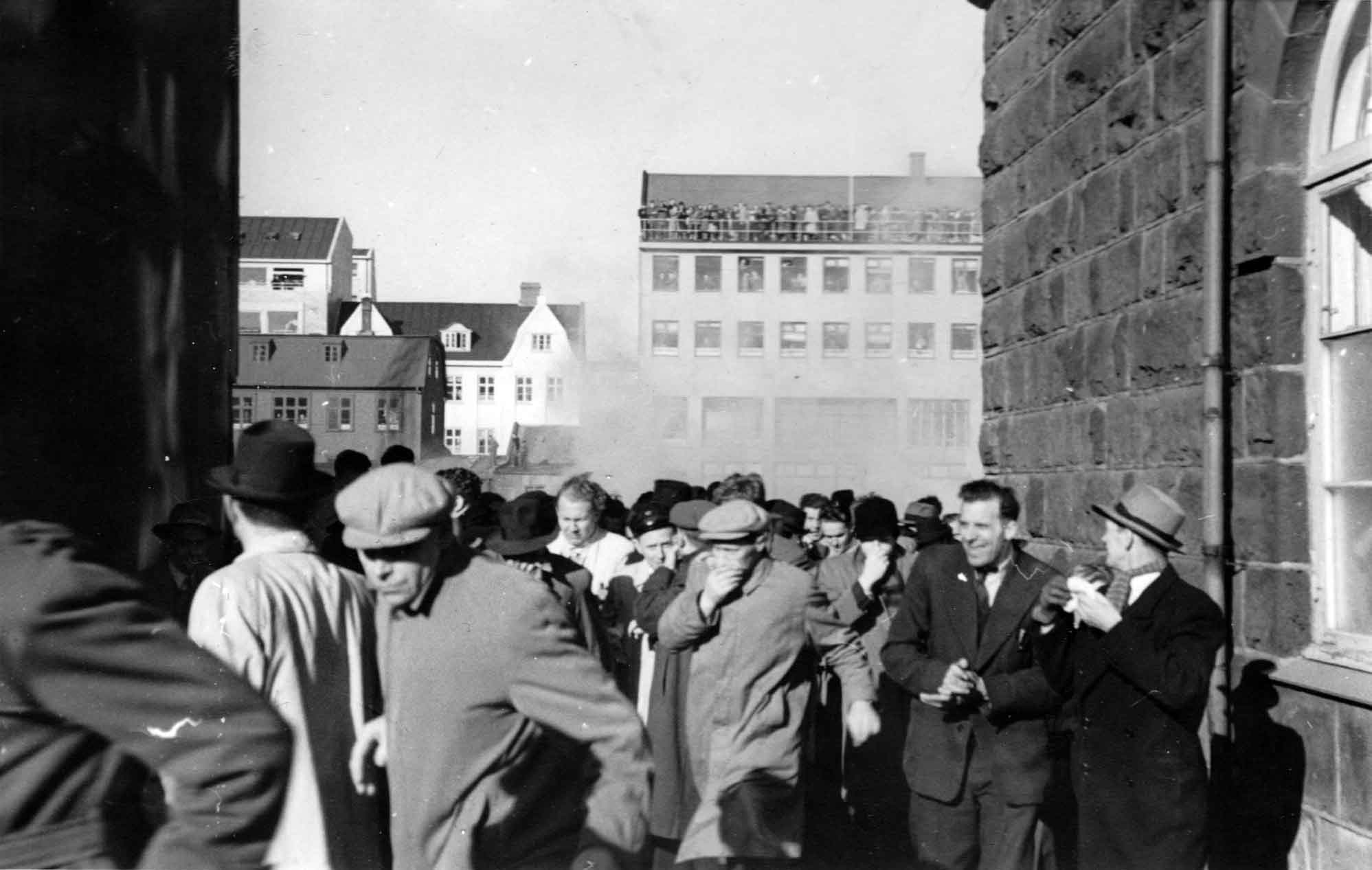
People flee from tear gas unleashed by police.
