= Outline of Iceland =

Overview of and topical guide to Iceland

The Flag of Iceland

The Coat of arms of Iceland

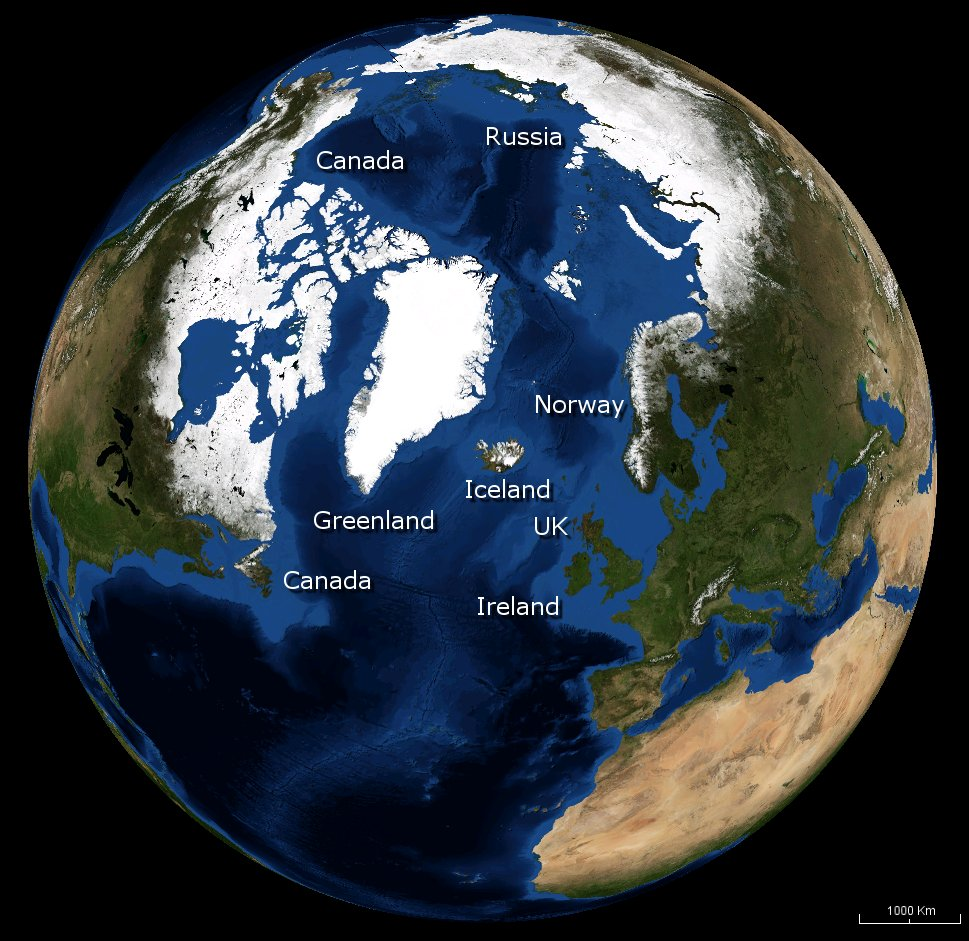
The location of Iceland

An enlargeable topographic map of the Republic of Iceland

The following outline is provided as an overview of and topical guide to Iceland:

Iceland – sovereign island nation located in the North Atlantic Ocean between continental Europe and Greenland. It is considered part of Northern Europe. It is the least populous of the Nordic countries, having a population of about 329,000 (January 1, 2015). Iceland is volcanically and geologically active on a large scale; this defines the landscape in various ways. The interior mainly consists of a plateau characterized by sand fields, mountains and glaciers, while many big glacial rivers flow to the sea through the lowlands. Warmed by the Gulf Stream, Iceland has a temperate climate relative to its latitude and provides a habitable environment and nature.

== General reference ==
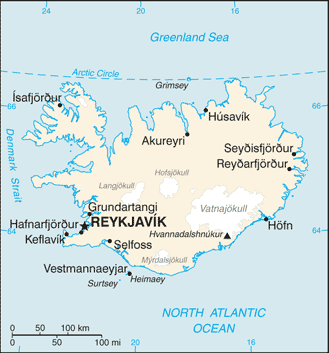
An enlargeable basic map of Iceland

- Pronunciation: /ˈaɪs.lənd/
- Common English country name: Iceland
- Official English country name: Iceland
- Common endonym(s): Ísland
- Official endonym(s): Ísland
- Adjectival(s): Icelandic
- Demonym(s): Icelander(s)
- Etymology: Name of Iceland
- ISO country codes: IS, ISL, 352
- ISO region codes: See ISO 3166-2:IS
- Internet country code top-level domain: .is

== Geography of Iceland ==
An enlargeable topographic map of Iceland

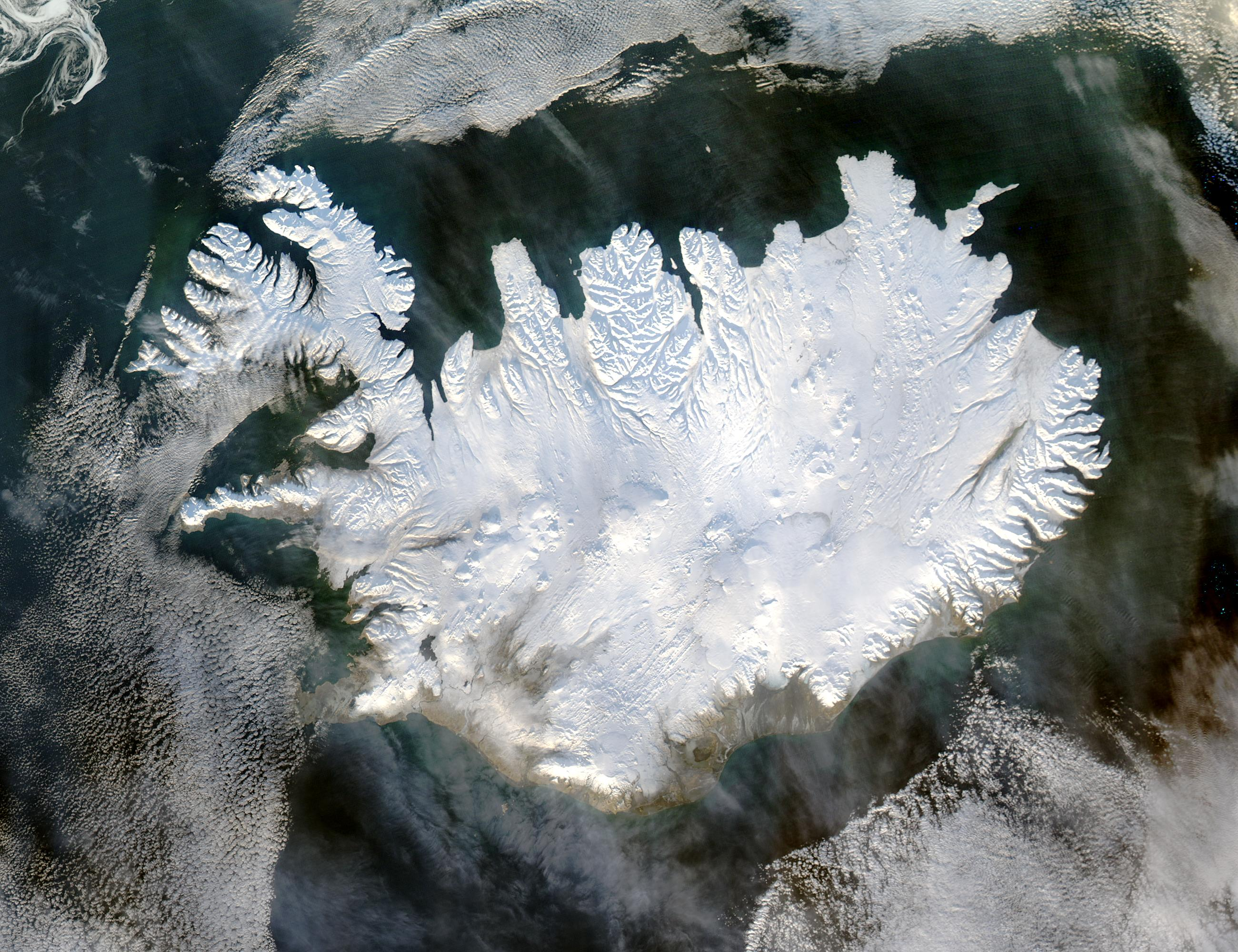
An enlargeable satellite image of Iceland

Geography of Iceland

- Iceland is: a Nordic island country
- Land boundaries: none
- Coastline: 4,970 km
- Population of Iceland: 319,326 people (April 2009 estimate) - 172nd most populous country
- Area of Iceland: 103,000 km^{2} (40,000 sq mi) - 107th largest country
- Atlas of Iceland

=== Location of Iceland ===
- Iceland is situated within the following regions:
  - Northern Hemisphere and Western Hemisphere
  - Atlantic Ocean
    - North Atlantic
  - Eurasia
    - Europe
      - Northern Europe
        - Nordic region
  - Time zone: Coordinated Universal Time UTC+00
- Extreme points of Iceland
  - High: Hvannadalshnúkur 2,110 m (6,923 ft)
  - Low: North Atlantic Ocean 0 m

=== Environment of Iceland ===
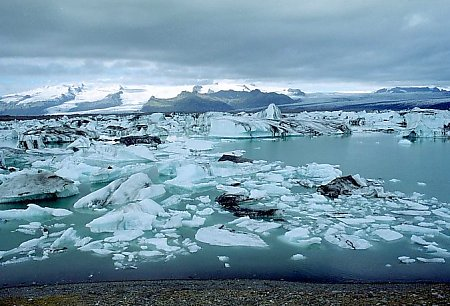
Jökulsárlón, a glacial lake in Iceland

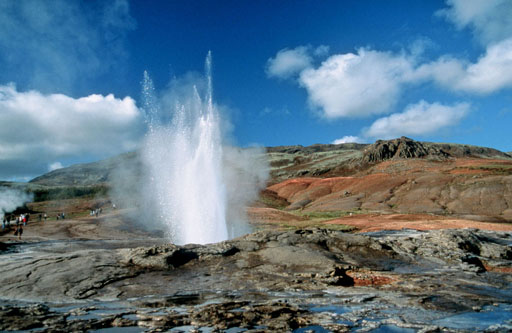
The Great Geysir at Haukadalur, Golden Circle

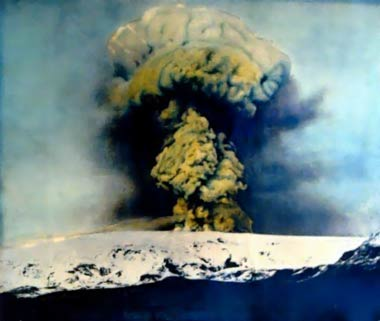
Katla eruption, 1918

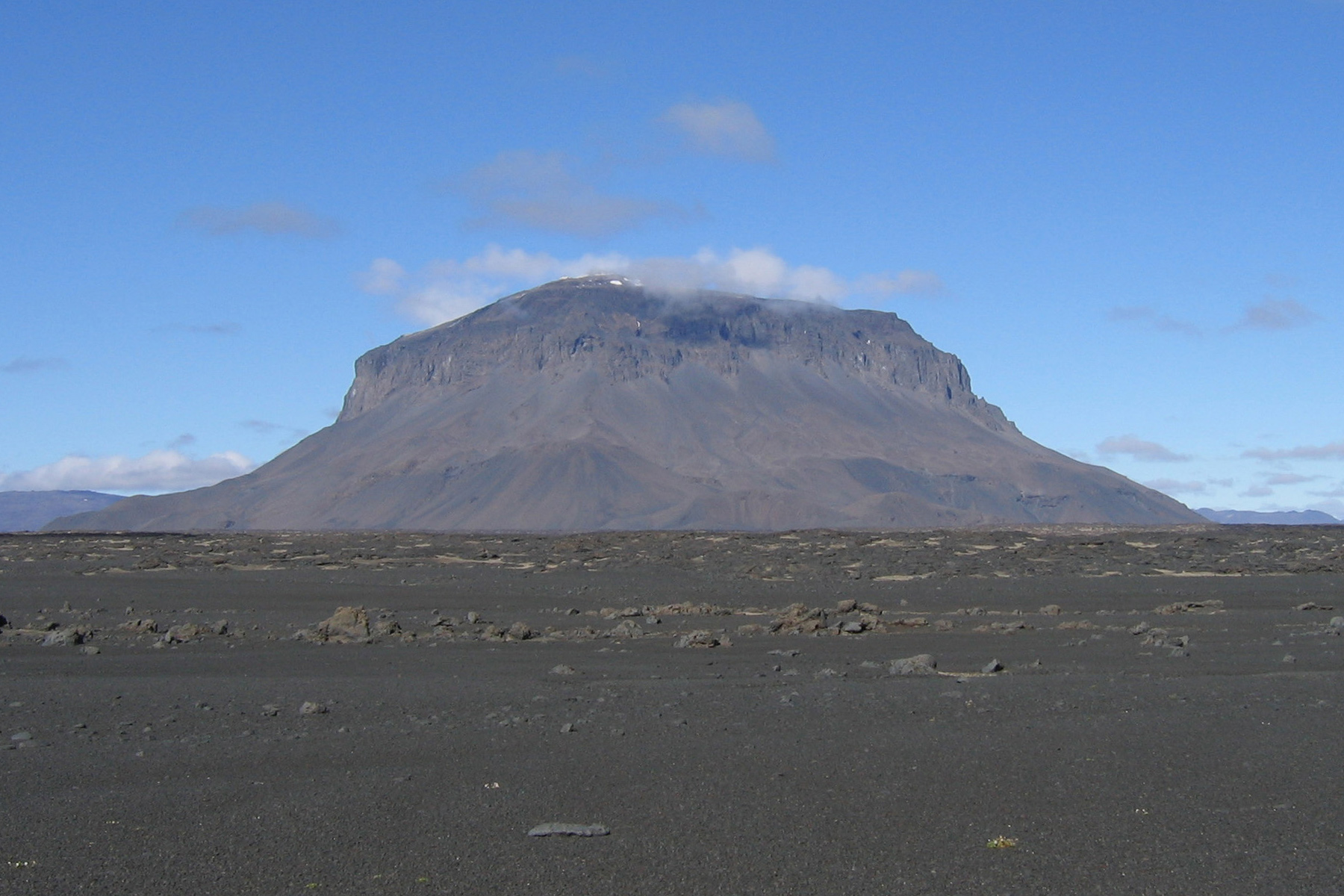
Herðubreið, a tuya volcano in the interior of Iceland, viewed from the southeast.

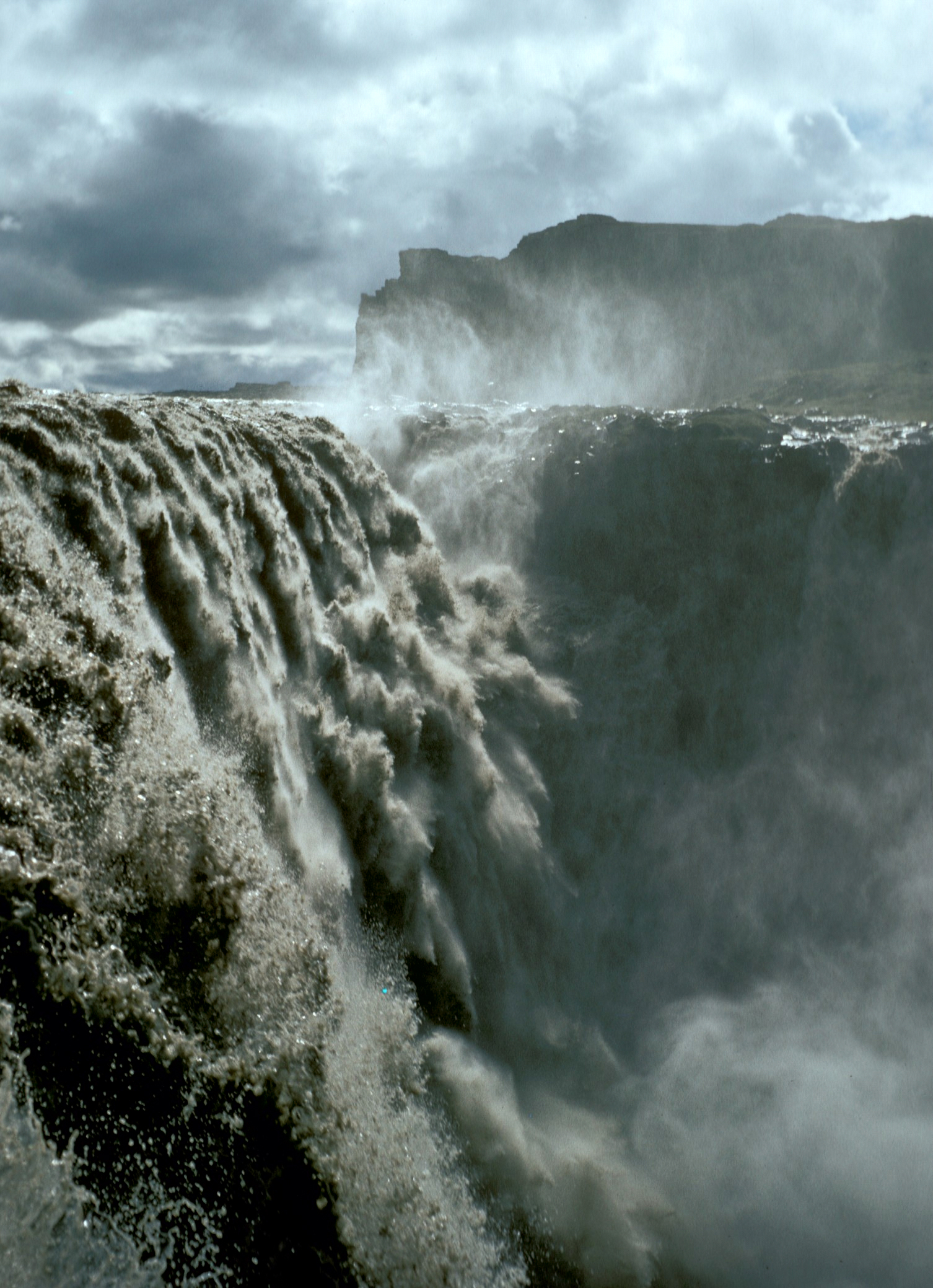
Dettifoss, in northern Iceland

- Climate of Iceland
- Renewable energy in Iceland
  - Geothermal power in Iceland
- Geology of Iceland
  - Earthquakes in Iceland
  - Volcanism of Iceland
    - List of volcanic eruptions in Iceland
    - List of volcanoes in Iceland
    - Iceland hotspot
    - Iceland plume
- National parks of Iceland
  - Snæfellsjökull
  - Vatnajökull
  - Þingvellir
- Wildlife of Iceland
  - Flora of Iceland
    - The Botany of Iceland
    - Campanula uniflora
    - Cerastium arcticum
    - Crowberry
    - Dryas octopetala
    - Lupinus nootkatensis
    - Ranunculus glacialis
    - Salix arctica
    - Saxifraga cernua
    - Saxifraga cespitosa
    - Stellaria humifusa
  - Fauna of Iceland
    - Birds of Iceland
      - Anatidae
        - Cygnus olor
        - Cygnus columbianus
        - Cygnus cygnus
        - Anser fabalis
        - Anser brachyrhynchus
    - Insects of Iceland
      - Moths of Iceland
    - Mammals of Iceland
    - Fishes of Iceland
      - Freshwater fishes of Iceland

==== Geographic features of Iceland ====
- Fjords of Iceland
- Glaciers of Iceland
- Highlands of Iceland
- Islands of Iceland
- Lakes of Iceland
- Mountains of Iceland
  - Baula
  - Borgarvirki
  - Búrfellshyrna
  - Búlandstindur
  - Eldgjá
  - Esjan
  - Helgafell
  - Herðubreið
  - Hlíðarfjall
  - Hvannadalshnúkur
  - Kerling
  - Kerlingarfjöll (mountain range)
  - Kverkfjöll (mountain range)
  - Súlur
  - Óshyrna
  - Volcanoes in Iceland
    - Askja
    - Bláhnjúkur
    - Brennisteinsalda
    - Búrfell
    - Hekla
    - Helgafell
    - Hengill
    - Katla
    - Kollóttadyngja
    - Krafla
    - Laki
    - Öræfajökull
    - Skjaldbreiður
    - Snæfellsjökull
    - Trölladyngja
- Rivers of Iceland
  - Waterfalls of Iceland
- Valleys of Iceland
- World Heritage Sites in Iceland

=== Regions of Iceland ===
The regions of Iceland.

Landsvæði	English name	Population	Area (km^{2})	Population density	ISO 3166
Höfuðborgarsvæði	Capital Region	202 131	1 062	190.33/km^{2}	IS-1
Suðurnes	Southern Peninsula	21 088	829	25.44/km^{2}	IS-2
Vesturland	West	15 589	9 554	1.63/km^{2}	IS-3
Vestfirðir	Westfjords	7 137	9 409	0.76/km^{2}	IS-4
Norðurland vestra	Northwest	7 393	12 737	0.58/km^{2}	IS-5
Norðurland eystra	Northeast	29 006	21 968	1.32/km^{2}	IS-6
Austurland	East	12 306	22 721	0.54/km^{2}	IS-7
Suðurland	South	23 802	24 526	0.97/km^{2}	IS-8
Ísland	Iceland	318 452	102 928	3.1/km^{2}	--N/A--

==== Region codes ====
- NUTS of Iceland
- ISO 3166-2 codes of Iceland
- FIPS region codes of Iceland

==== Administrative divisions of Iceland ====
Constituencies of Iceland

Administrative divisions of Iceland

- Regions of Iceland
- Counties of Iceland

===== Constituencies of Iceland =====
Constituencies of Iceland Iceland is divided into 6 constituencies for the purpose of selecting representatives to the Alþingi (parliament):

- Reykjavík North (11)
- Reykjavík South (11)
- Northwest (9)
- Northeast (10)
- South (10)
- Southwest (12)

===== Municipalities of Iceland =====
Municipalities of Iceland

- Cities of Iceland (by population)
  - Capital of Iceland: Reykjavík
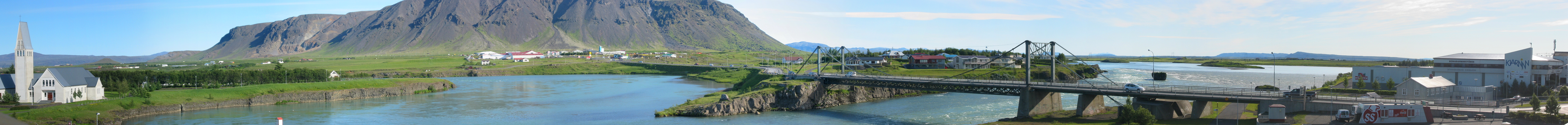
A panorama of Selfoss

=== Demography of Iceland ===
Demographics of Iceland

== Government and politics of Iceland ==
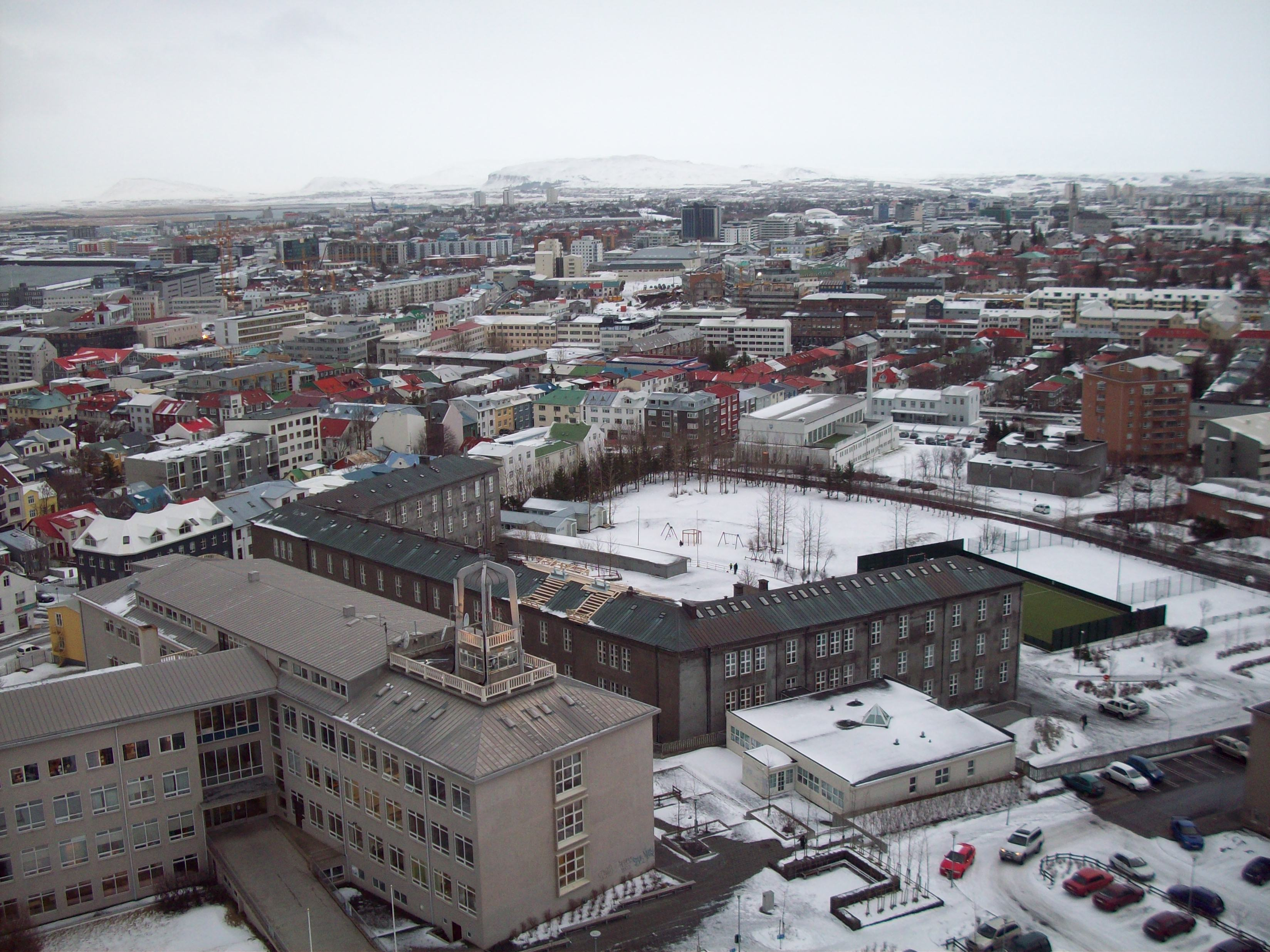
Reykjavík as seen from the Hallgrímskirkja tower.

- Form of government: unitary parliamentary representative democratic republic
- Capital of Iceland: Reykjavík
- Elections in Iceland
- Icelandic nationalism
- Political parties in Iceland
- Icelandic political scandals
- Taxation in Iceland

=== Branches of the government of Iceland ===
Government of Iceland

==== Executive branch of the government of Iceland ====
- Head of state: Guðni Th. Jóhannesson, President of Iceland
- Head of government: Sigurður Ingi Jóhannsson, Prime Minister of Iceland
  - First Lady of Iceland
- Cabinet of Iceland
  - Cabinet ministers
    - Minister of Education, Science and Culture of Iceland: Illugi Gunnarsson
    - Minister for the Environment of Iceland: Sigrún Magnúsdóttir
    - Minister of Finance of Iceland: Bjarni Benediktsson
    - Minister of Fisheries and Agriculture of Iceland: Sigurður Ingi Jóhannsson
    - Minister for Foreign Affairs of Iceland: Gunnar Bragi Sveinsson
    - Minister of Health: Kristján Þór Júlíusson (Part of the Ministry of Welfare (Iceland))
    - Minister of Social Affairs and Housing: Eygló Harðardóttir (Part of the Ministry of Welfare (Iceland))
    - Ministry of Industries and Innovation of Iceland: Ragnheiður Elín Árnadóttir
    - Minister of the Interior of Iceland: Ólöf Nordal
  - List of cabinets of Iceland
- List of Icelandic ministries

==== Legislative branch of the government of Iceland ====
- Parliament of Iceland
  - List of standing committees of the Icelandic parliament
  - List of speakers of the Parliament of Iceland

==== Judicial branch of the government of Iceland ====
- Supreme Court of Iceland

=== Foreign relations of Iceland ===
Foreign relations of Iceland

- Accession of Iceland to the European Union
- List of diplomatic missions in Iceland
- List of diplomatic missions of Iceland
- Visa requirements for Icelandic citizens

==== International organization membership ====
International organization membership of Iceland The Republic of Iceland is a member of:

- Arctic Council
- Australia Group
- Bank for International Settlements (BIS)
- Council of Europe (CE)
- Council of the Baltic Sea States (CBSS)
- Euro-Atlantic Partnership Council (EAPC)
- European Bank for Reconstruction and Development (EBRD)
- European Free Trade Association (EFTA)
- Food and Agriculture Organization (FAO)
- International Atomic Energy Agency (IAEA)
- International Bank for Reconstruction and Development (IBRD)
- International Chamber of Commerce (ICC)
- International Civil Aviation Organization (ICAO)
- International Criminal Court (ICCt)
- International Criminal Police Organization (Interpol)
- International Development Association (IDA)
- International Federation of Red Cross and Red Crescent Societies (IFRCS)
- International Finance Corporation (IFC)
- International Fund for Agricultural Development (IFAD)
- International Hydrographic Organization (IHO)
- International Labour Organization (ILO)
- International Maritime Organization (IMO)
- International Mobile Satellite Organization (IMSO)
- International Monetary Fund (IMF)
- International Olympic Committee (IOC)
- International Organization for Standardization (ISO)
- International Red Cross and Red Crescent Movement (ICRM)
- International Telecommunication Union (ITU)
- International Telecommunications Satellite Organization (ITSO)
- International Trade Union Confederation (ITUC)
- Inter-Parliamentary Union (IPU)
- Multilateral Investment Guarantee Agency (MIGA)
- Nordic Council (NC)
- Nordic Investment Bank (NIB)
- North Atlantic Treaty Organization (NATO)
- Nuclear Energy Agency (NEA)
- Organisation for Economic Co-operation and Development (OECD)
- Organization for Security and Co-operation in Europe (OSCE)
- Organisation for the Prohibition of Chemical Weapons (OPCW)
- Organization of American States (OAS) (observer)
- Permanent Court of Arbitration (PCA)
- Schengen Convention
- United Nations (UN)
- United Nations Conference on Trade and Development (UNCTAD)
- United Nations Educational, Scientific, and Cultural Organization (UNESCO)
- Universal Postal Union (UPU)
- Western European Union (WEU) (associate)
- World Customs Organization (WCO)
- World Federation of Trade Unions (WFTU)
- World Health Organization (WHO)
- World Intellectual Property Organization (WIPO)
- World Meteorological Organization (WMO)
- World Trade Organization (WTO)

=== Law and order in Iceland ===
Law of Iceland

- Abortion in Iceland
- Cannabis in Iceland
- Capital punishment in Iceland
- Constitution of Iceland
- Human rights in Iceland
  - Freedom of religion in Iceland
  - LGBT rights in Iceland
  - Prostitution in Iceland — in 2009, the paying for sex was outlawed, criminalizing the clients, while selling sex remained decriminalized.
- Icelandic passport
- Icelandic identity card
- Icelandic driving licence
- Law enforcement in Iceland
  - National Police of Iceland
  - Víkingasveitin (The Viking Squad)

=== Military of Iceland ===
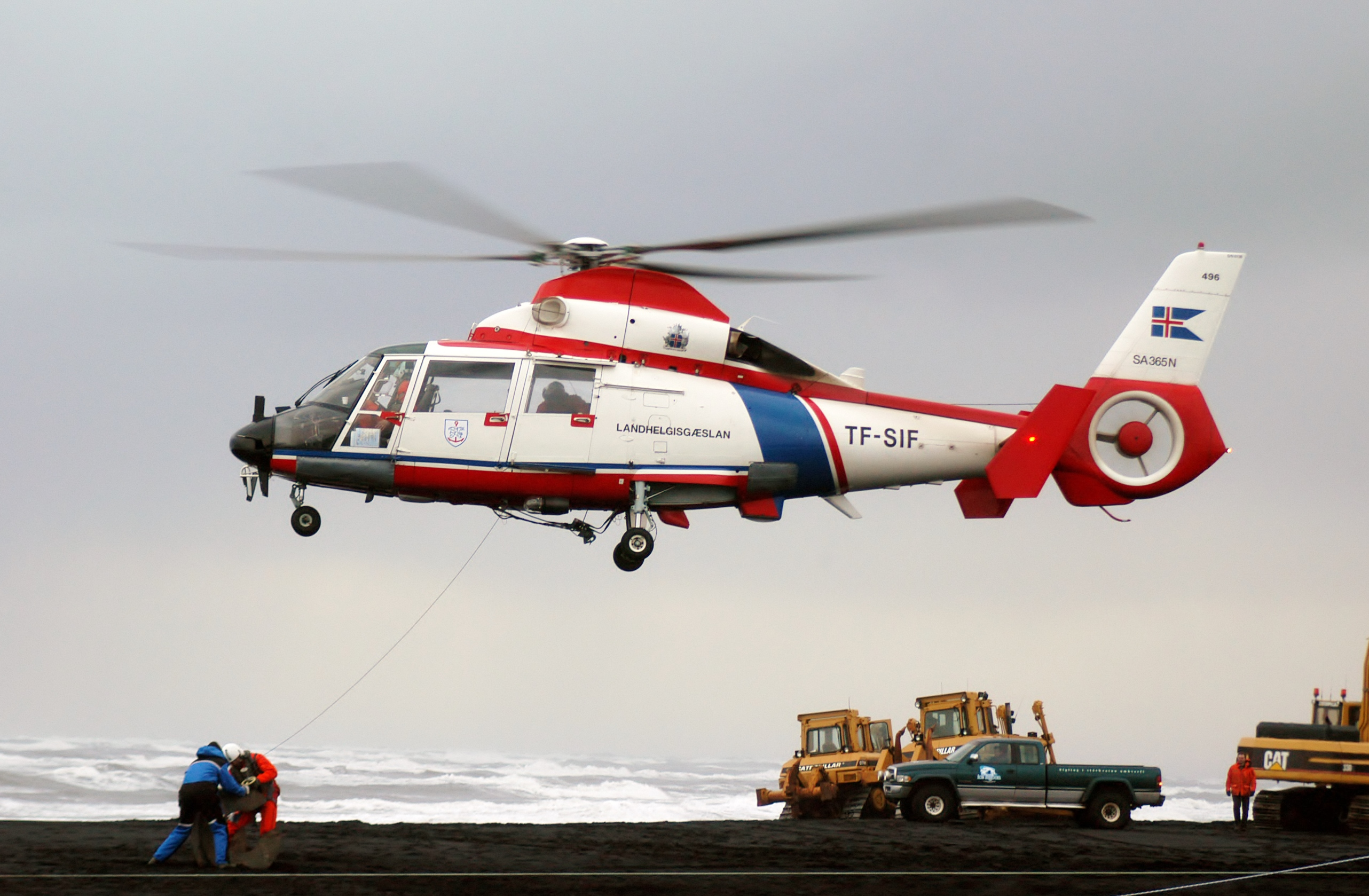
Icelandic Coast Guard helicopter

Military of Iceland

- Icelandic Coast Guard
- Iceland Air Defence System
- Icelandic Air Policing
- Iceland Crisis Response Unit
- Víkingasveitin: Equivalent to the American SWAT unit
- Military history of Iceland

== History of Iceland ==
=== By period ===
- Settlement of Iceland
- History of Icelandic nationality
- Icelandic Commonwealth
- Age of the Sturlungs
- Farthings of Iceland
- Christianisation of Iceland
- Icelandic Reformation
- Danish-Icelandic Trade Monopoly
- New Iceland
- Kingdom of Iceland
- Prohibition in Iceland
- Iceland during World War II
  - Invasion of Iceland
  - Military operations in Scandinavia and Iceland during World War II
- Founding of the Republic of Iceland
- Iceland in the Cold War
- Iceland Defense Force
- Accession of Iceland to the European Union
- 2010 Iceland power outages

=== By subject ===
- Agriculture in Iceland
- Economic history of Iceland
- History of the Jews in Iceland
- Military history of Iceland
- Postage stamps and postal history of Iceland
- List of rulers of Iceland

== Culture of Iceland ==
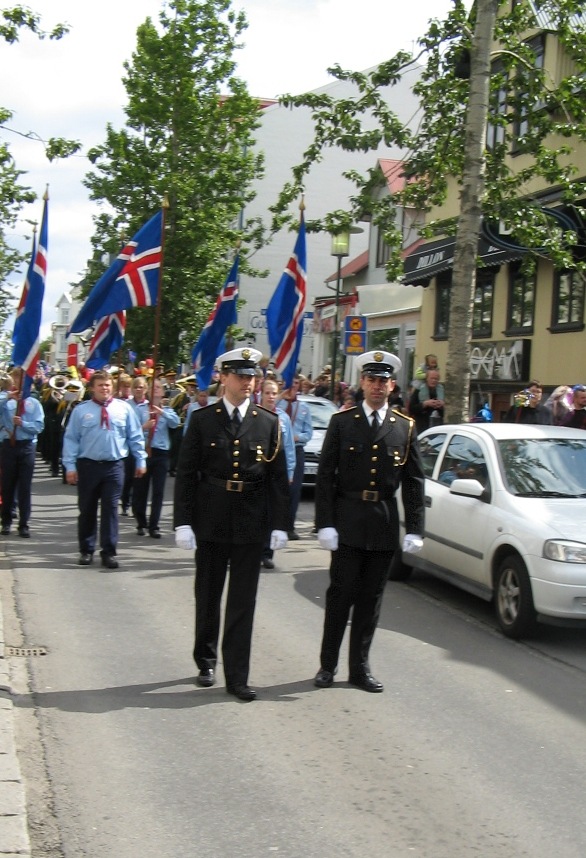
The National Day procession in Reykjavík June 17, 2007.

- Architecture of Iceland
  - Icelandic turf houses
  - List of tallest buildings in Iceland
  - List of tallest structures in Iceland
- Icelandic cuisine
  - Beer in Iceland
- Festivals in Iceland
  - Iceland Airwaves
- Heraldry in Iceland
- Media of Iceland
- Miss Iceland
- Museums in Iceland
- National and University Library of Iceland
- National symbols of Iceland
  - Coat of arms of Iceland
  - Flag of Iceland
    - List of flags of Iceland
  - National anthem of Iceland
- Order of the Falcon
- Prostitution in Iceland — in 2009, the paying for sex was outlawed, criminalizing the clients, while selling sex remained decriminalized.
- Public holidays in Iceland
  - First Day of Summer
  - Icelandic National Day
- Smoking in Iceland
- Icelandic weddings
- World Heritage Sites in Iceland

=== Art in Iceland ===
- Icelandic art
- Cinema of Iceland
  - List of Icelandic films
  - List of Icelandic submissions for the Academy Award for Best Foreign Language Film
- Icelandic cuisine
  - Þorramatur
- Icelandic literature
  - List of Icelandic-language poets
  - List of Icelandic writers
- Music of Iceland
  - List of Icelandic composers
  - Icelandic folk music
  - Icelandic hip hop
  - Icelandic rock
  - List of bands from Iceland
- Television in Iceland

=== Language in Iceland ===
- Languages of Iceland
  - Icelandic language
    - History of Icelandic
    - Icelandic exonyms
    - Icelandic grammar
    - Icelandic Literary Society
    - Icelandic name
      - Icelandic Naming Committee
    - Icelandic orthography
    - Icelandic phonology
    - Linguistic purism in Icelandic
      - High Icelandic
    - Icelandic vocabulary
  - Icelandic Sign Language

=== Religion in Iceland ===
Religion in Iceland

- Icelandic funeral
- Religions in Iceland
  - Christianity in Iceland
    - Church of Iceland
    - Roman Catholicism in Iceland
  - Neopaganism in Iceland
  - Bahá'í Faith in Iceland
  - Buddhism in Iceland
  - Islam in Iceland
  - Judaism in Iceland
    - History of the Jews in Iceland

=== Sport in Iceland ===
Sport in Iceland

- Icelandic Chess Championship
- Cricket in Iceland
- Iceland at the Paralympics
- Icelandic records in athletics
- Strength athletics in Iceland
- Íþróttafélag Reykjavíkur

==== Olympics ====
- Iceland at the Olympics

==== Basketball ====
- Iceland men's national basketball team
- Iceland women's national basketball team

==== Football ====
- Australian rules football in Iceland
- Football Association of Iceland
- Icelandic football league system
- List of football clubs in Iceland
- List of football stadiums in Iceland
- National football teams
  - Iceland national football team
  - Iceland national under-17 football team
  - Iceland women's national football team

==== Handball ====
- Icelandic Handball Association
- Iceland men's national handball team

==== Ice hockey ====
- Ice Hockey Iceland
- Icelandic Hockey League
- Icelandic national ice hockey team
- Iceland women's national ice hockey team

==== Rowing ====
- Fiann Paul

==== Tennis ====
- Iceland Davis Cup team
- Iceland Fed Cup team

==== Sports personalities ====
Eiður Smári Guðjohnsen

- Heiðar Helguson, professional footballer, currently at Fulham
- Hermann Hreiðarsson
- Jón Páll Sigmarsson
- Magnús Ver Magnússon
- Ólafur Stefánsson
- Anníe Mist Þórisdóttir

== Economy and infrastructure of Iceland ==
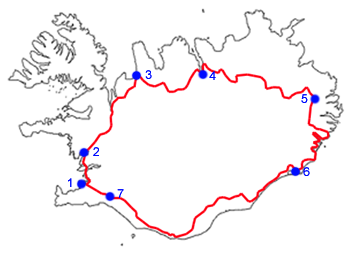
The Ring Road of Iceland and some towns it passes through: 1.Reykjavík, 2.Borgarnes, 3.Blönduós, 4.Akureyri, 5.Egilsstaðir, 6.Höfn, 7.Selfoss

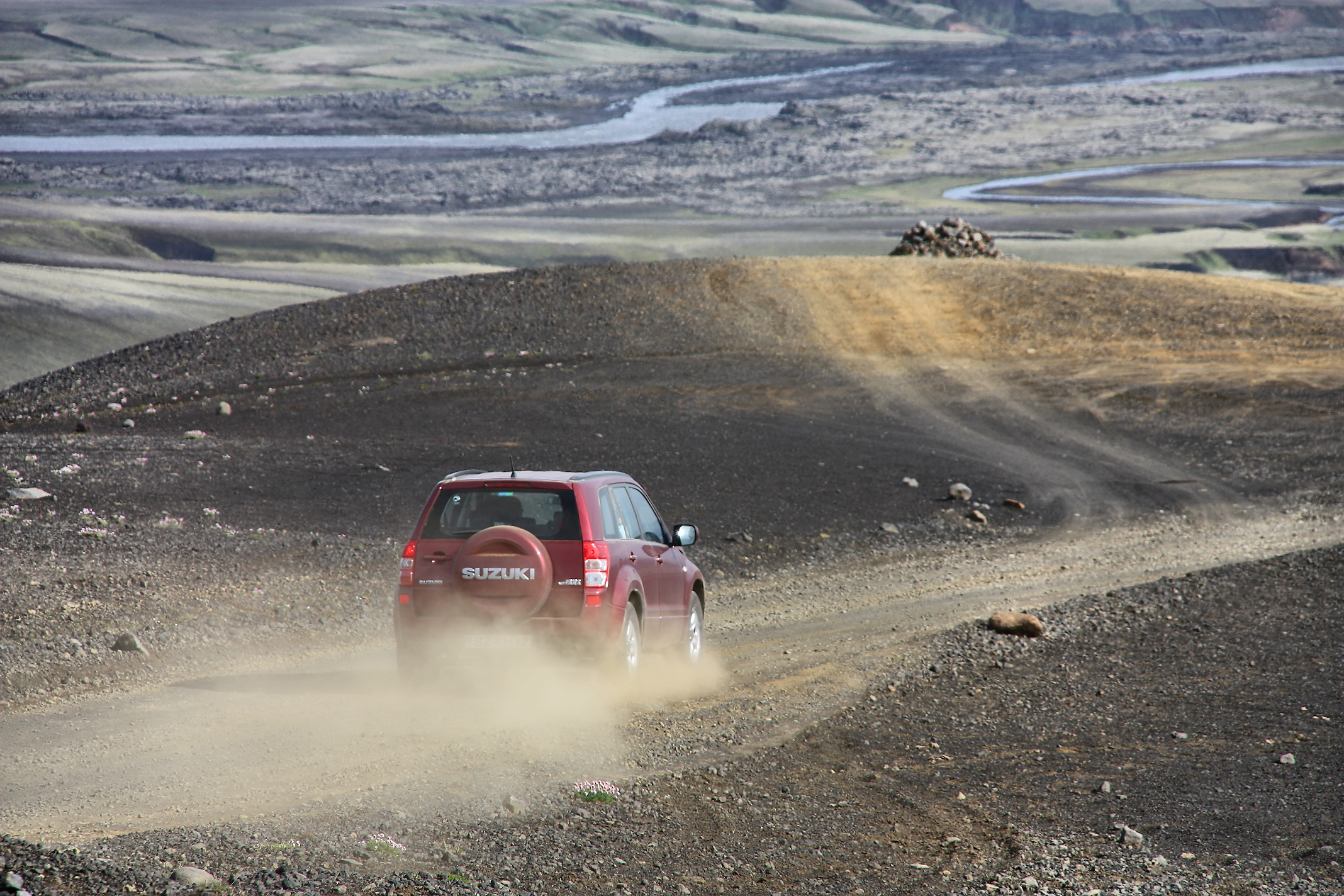
Example of unpaved road in the Highlands of Iceland

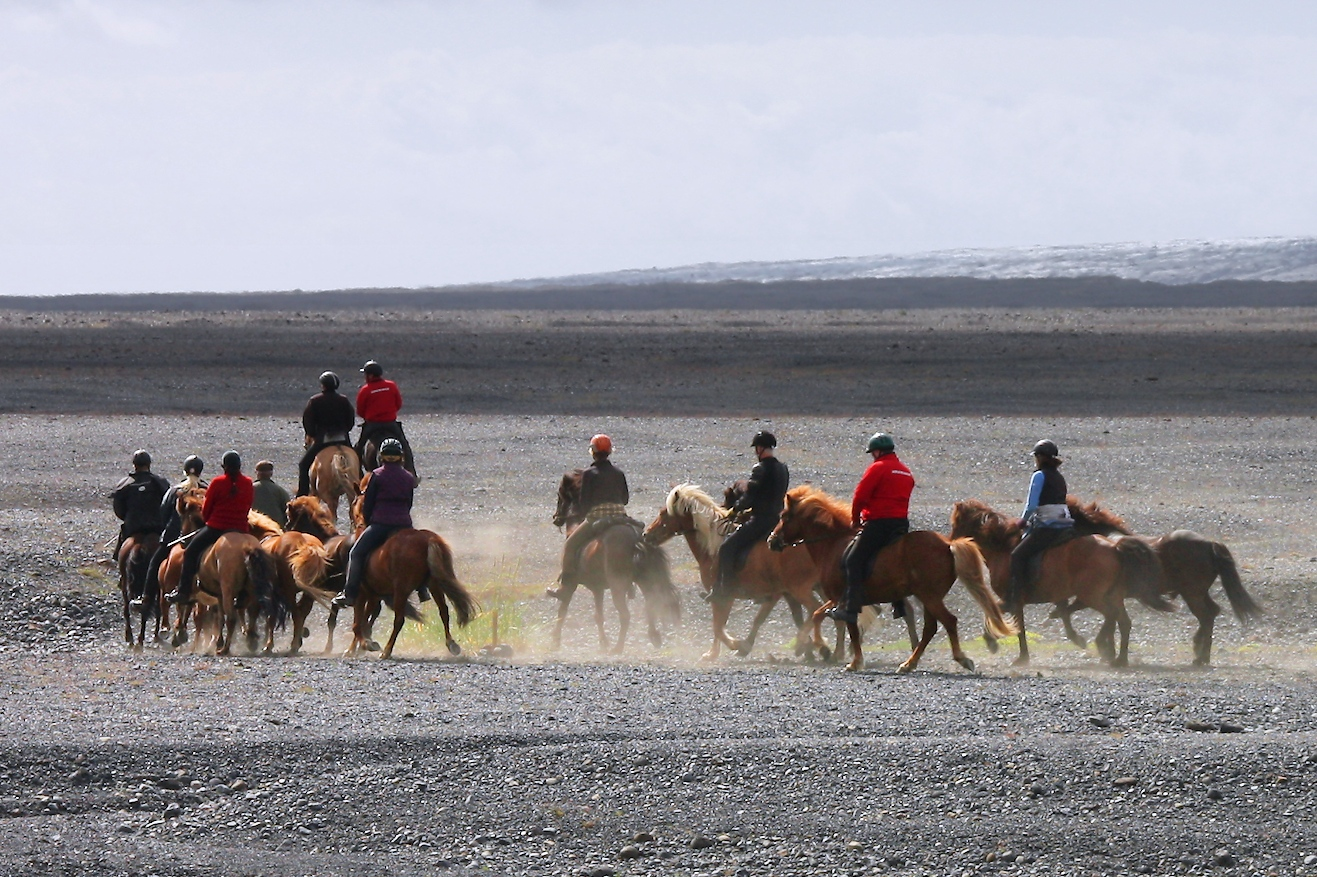
Tourism activity: Icelandic horse tour in Skaftafell, Vatnajökull National Park

Economy of Iceland

- Economic rank, by nominal GDP (2007): 92nd (ninety-second)
- 2008–2012 Icelandic financial crisis
- Agriculture in Iceland
  - Whaling in Iceland
- Banking in Iceland
  - Banks of Iceland
    - Central Bank of Iceland
    - National Bank of Iceland
- Communications in Iceland
  - List of newspapers in Iceland
  - List of postal codes in Iceland
  - Telecommunications in Iceland
    - Internet in Iceland
  - Telephone numbers in Iceland
- Companies of Iceland
  - List of companies of Iceland
  - Companies listed on the Iceland Stock Exchange
- Currency of Iceland: Króna
  - ISO 4217: ISK
- Economic history of Iceland
- Energy in Iceland
  - 2010 Iceland power outages
  - Iceland Deep Drilling Project
  - Power stations in Iceland
    - Icelandic hydroelectric power stations
  - Renewable energy in Iceland
    - Geothermal power in Iceland
- Healthcare in Iceland
  - Emergency medical services in Iceland
  - List of hospitals in Iceland
- National parks of Iceland
- Iceland Stock Exchange
- Tourism in Iceland
- Trade unions
  - Confederation of State and Municipal Employees of Iceland
  - Icelandic Federation of Labour
- Transport in Iceland
  - Airports in Iceland
  - Rail transport in Iceland - Iceland has no public rail system.
  - Roads in Iceland
    - Highway system of Iceland
    - Road signs in Iceland
    - Speed limits in Iceland
    - Street names in Iceland
    - Tunnels in Iceland
  - Vehicle registration plates of Iceland

== Education in Iceland ==
Education in Iceland

- Academic grading in Iceland
- Icelandic Student Loan Fund
- List of schools in Iceland
- Universities in Iceland
  - University of Iceland
    - National and University Library of Iceland

== See also ==
- Asteroid 110299 Iceland named after the island in 2018
- Index of Iceland-related articles
- List of international rankings
- Member state of the North Atlantic Treaty Organization
- Member state of the United Nations
