= Bláhnjúkur =

Mountain in Iceland

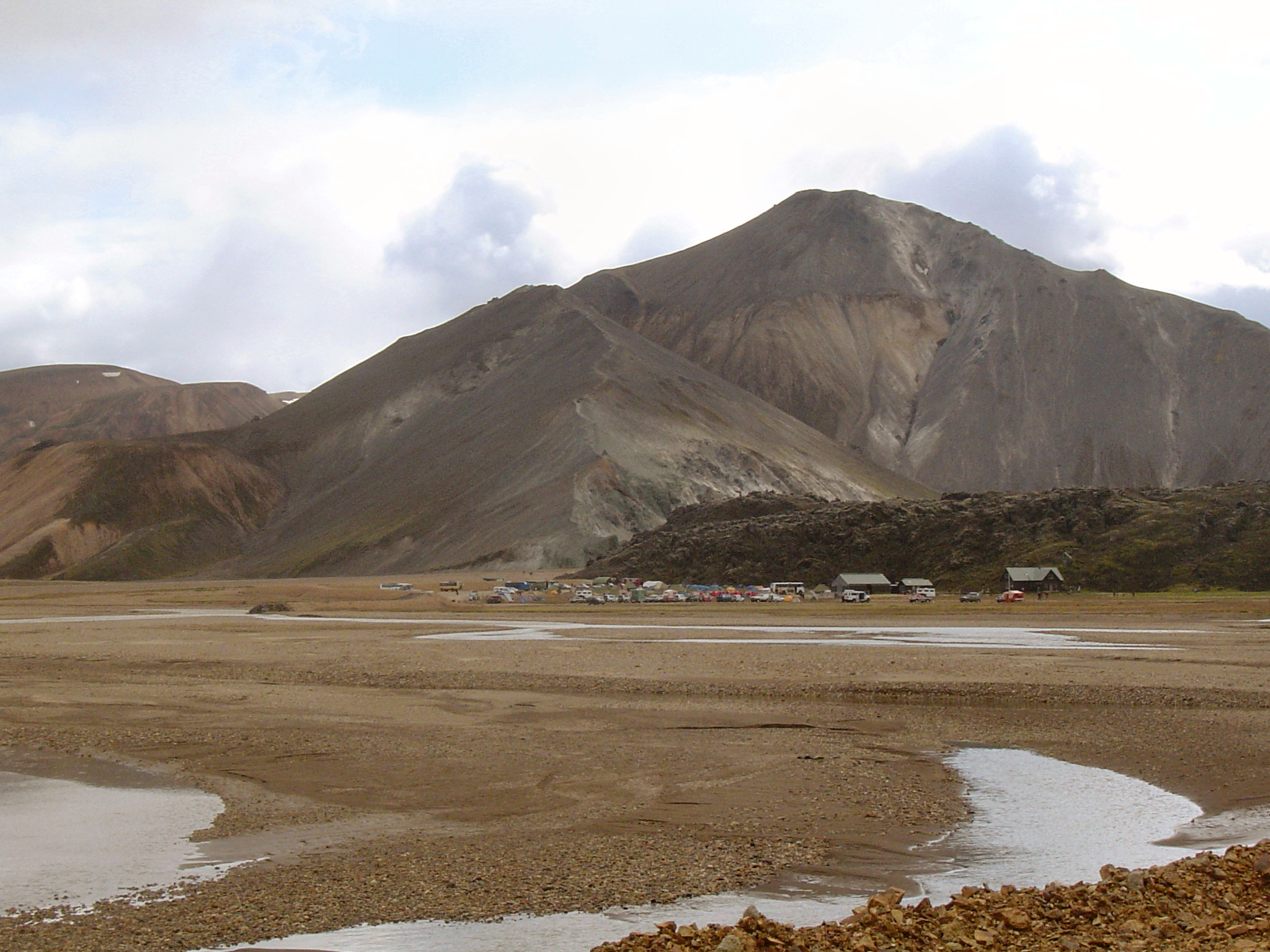
- Bláhnjúkur, 2004

Highest point
- Elevation: 945 m (3,100 ft)
- Coordinates: 63°58′36″N 19°04′05″W

Naming
- English translation: Blue mountain
- Language of name: Icelandic

Geography
- Location within Iceland
- Location: Landmannalaugar, Iceland

Geology
- Mountain type: Volcano

Climbing
- Easiest route: Hike

Bláhnjúkur (Icelandic pronunciation: [ˈplauːˌn̥juːkʏr̥]) is a volcano in the south of Iceland. Its height is 945 m.

Its name translates to blue peak in English. This comes from the blue-black colour of its sides. The colour is due to volcanic ash and lava flows.

The mountain is situated in Landmannalaugar, a natural park near Hekla. It lies next to the volcano Brennisteinsalda.

A hiking trail leads up to the top of the mountain from which, in good conditions, five glaciers are visible.

The best way to get to the peak is on road number F 208. You will need a 4x4 vehicle.

The hike is considered hard and takes 3-4 hours (6.8 miles) round-trip because of the steep inclines up (or down if you go counter-clockwise).

An easier trek is possible by climbing up to the peak and going back down the same way. The challenge with this way is that you will have to deal with the steep inclines up and back down.

== See also ==
- Geography of Iceland
- Volcanism of Iceland
