= Agriculture in Iceland =

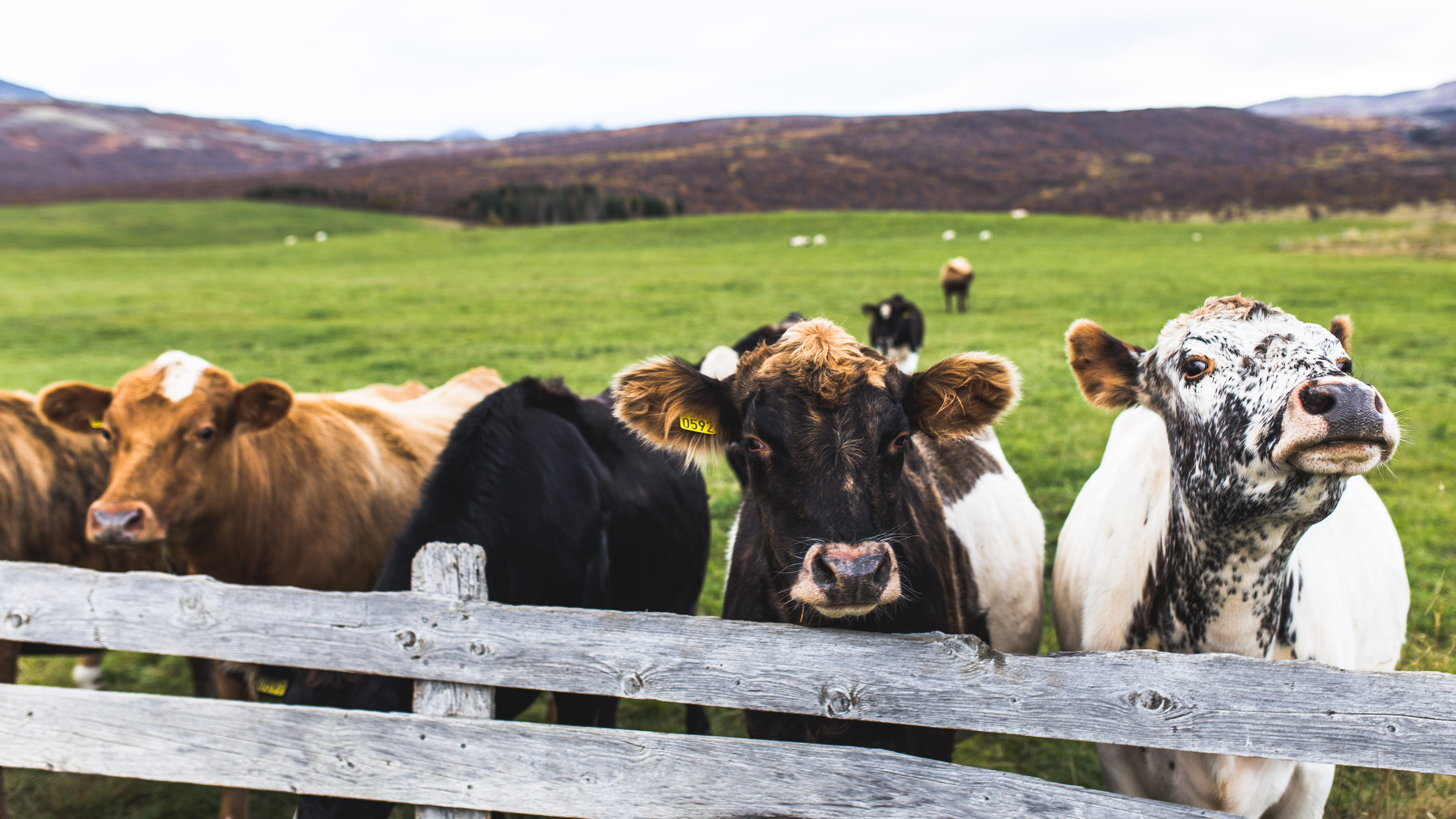
Cattle in Iceland

For centuries Iceland's main industries were fishing, fish processing and agriculture. In the 19th century, 70–80% of Icelanders lived by farming, but there has been a steady decline over the years and now that figure is less than 5% of the total population. It is expected that the number will continue to fall in the future. Only 1% of the total land area (of 100,000 km^{2}) is under arable cultivation, confined almost exclusively to the peripheral lowland areas of the country.

== Livestock ==
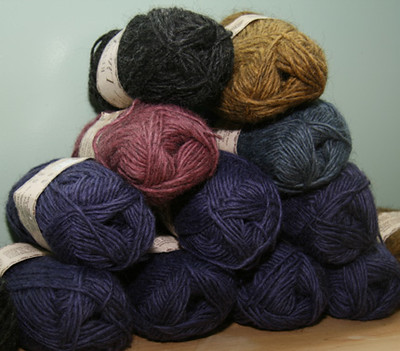
Yarn made from Icelandic wool

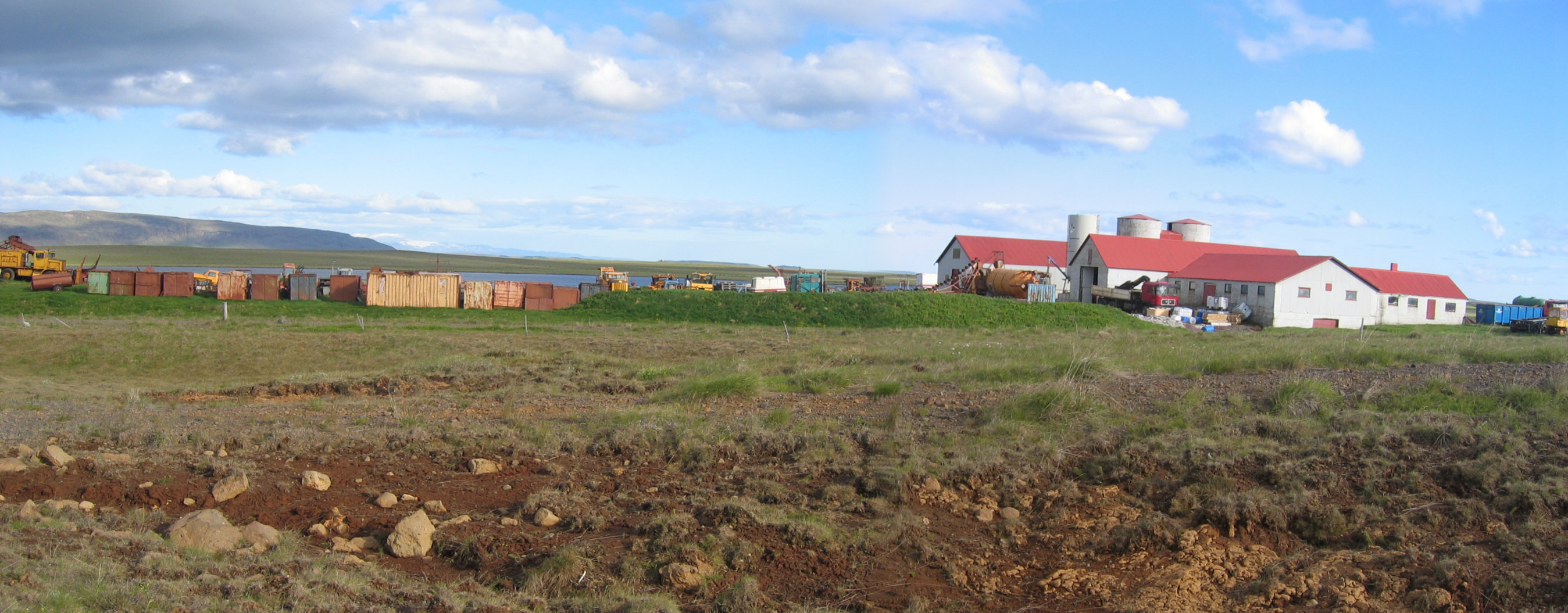
An Icelandic farm

The raising of livestock, sheep (the traditional mainstay for generations of Icelandic farmers) and cattle (the latter grew rapidly in the 20th century), is the main occupation, but pigs and poultry are also reared; Iceland is self-sufficient in the production of meat, dairy products and eggs.

== Vegetables, flowers and fodder crops ==
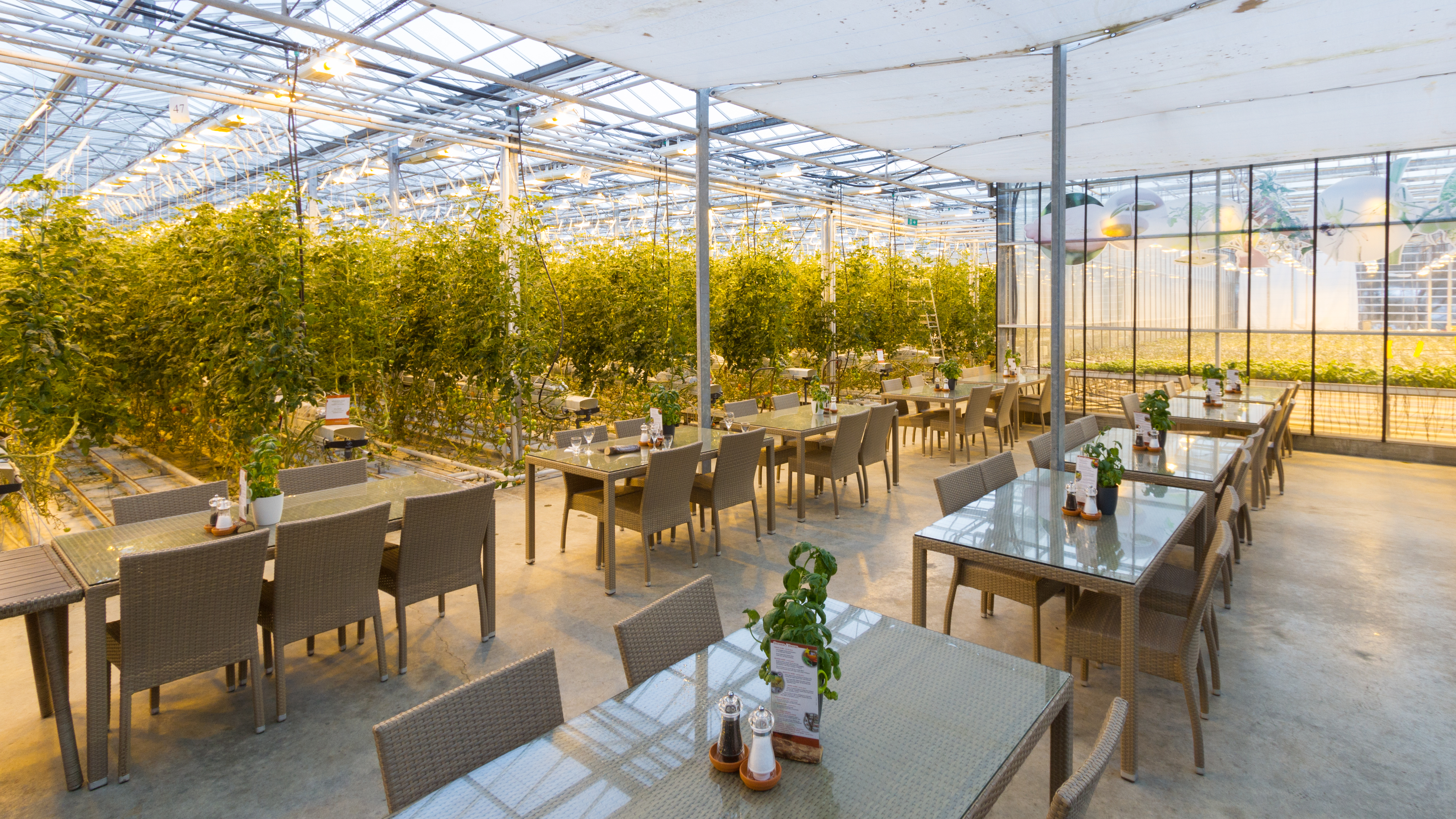
Greenhouse in Reykholt, Southern Iceland, growing tomatoes

Despite the cool climate and restricted growing season, a variety of food crops are grown, such as potatoes, rhubarb, turnips, radishes, carrots, broad-beans, peas, strawberries, cabbage, kale, and cauliflower. Other subtropical crops (such as tomatoes, cucumbers and green peppers), cut flowers and potted plants are grown in greenhouses heated with geothermal energy (which Iceland has in abundance)—in some cases artificial light is required to supplement the shorter daylight hours at these northern latitudes. Even bananas and grapes can be grown in this way—but not usually on a commercial scale. Fodder crops are also important: this includes grass (which in Iceland is exceptionally nutritious as a result of the long periods of daylight in the short, cool summers), rye and barley.

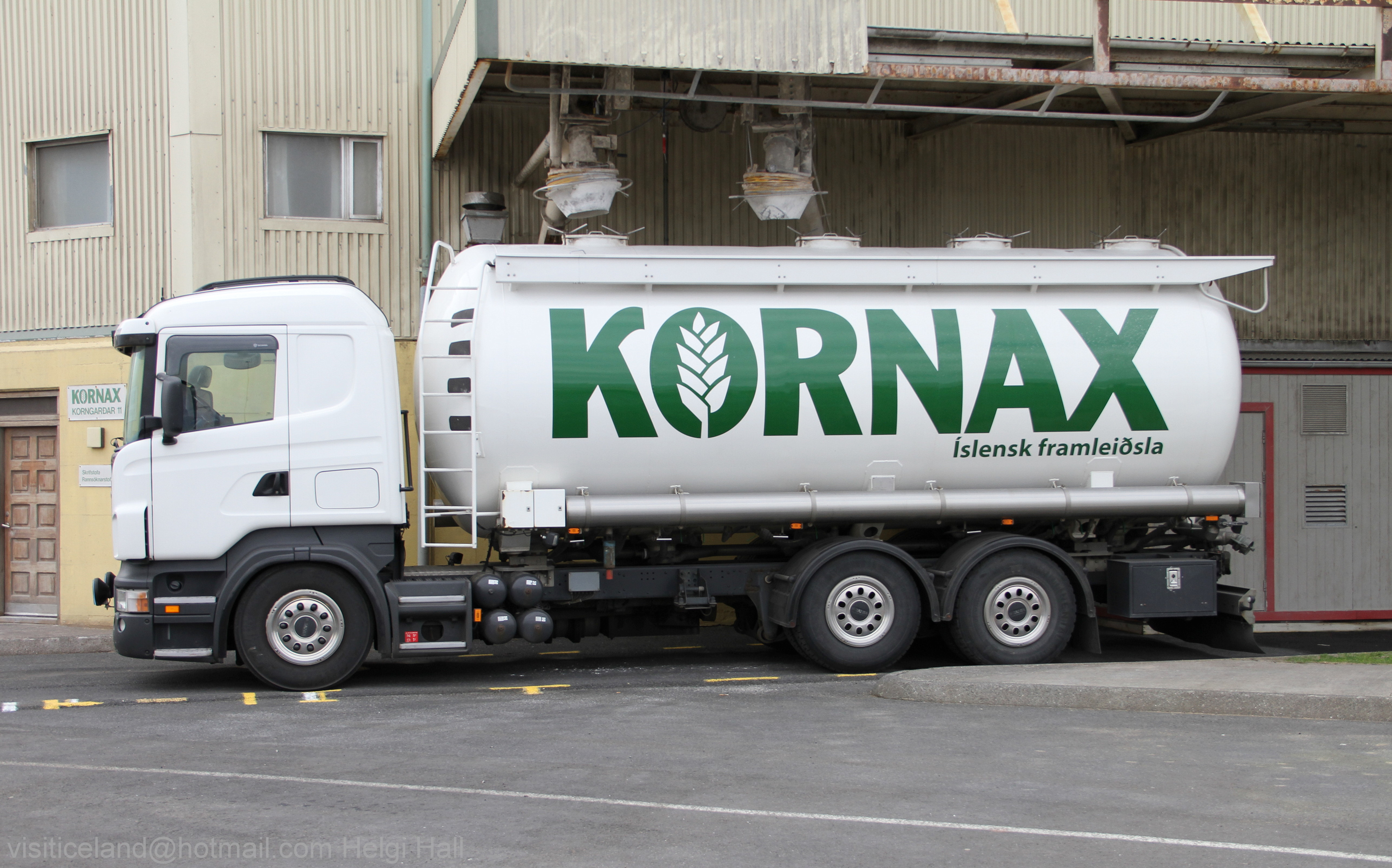
Truck with the logo of Kornax, operators of Iceland's only flour mill, who grind Icelandic wheat. In 2025 the company ceased operating, causing food security concerns.

The cool climate and northern latitude have certain advantages for agriculture: The lack of insect pests means that the use of agrochemicals—insecticides and herbicides—is very low, and the long hours of daylight in the cool summer allow grass to grow exceptionally well. The general lack of pollution—due to sparse population—means that food is less contaminated with artificial chemicals—advantages which have been capitalised upon by a small but growing organic sector.

== History ==
The Norsemen were pastoral people who relied heavily on a succession of successful farming years in order to survive. Norwegian settlers who inhabited the coasts of Iceland in the late ninth century brought their farming traditions with them.

The settlers brought sheep, cattle, horses, and goats from Norway to supply their farms with animals. Every animal served a purpose on the farm; sheep were valuable because of their ability to graze outside in the winter, and they provided food and wool. Cattle supplied most of the dairy products for the farm, which were stored over winter. Cattle were also eaten.

Early Icelandic farmers relied heavily on the natural pastures that encompassed their farm, but also planted grain, to be harvested for bread and fodder.

Farming in Iceland during the Middle Ages was complemented by hunting and gathering along the coast. Coastal areas facilitated fishing, whaling, and hunting. Sea birds, eggs, walrus, and lichens rounded out the Icelandic diet.

Early farms had a significant impact on the landscape in Iceland. Wide scale erosion began in the land-taking stages of settlement. Coupled with deforestation, this had a profound effect on the landscape of Iceland.
