= Landmannalaugar =

Location in Iceland

Coordinates: 63.983°N 19.067°W

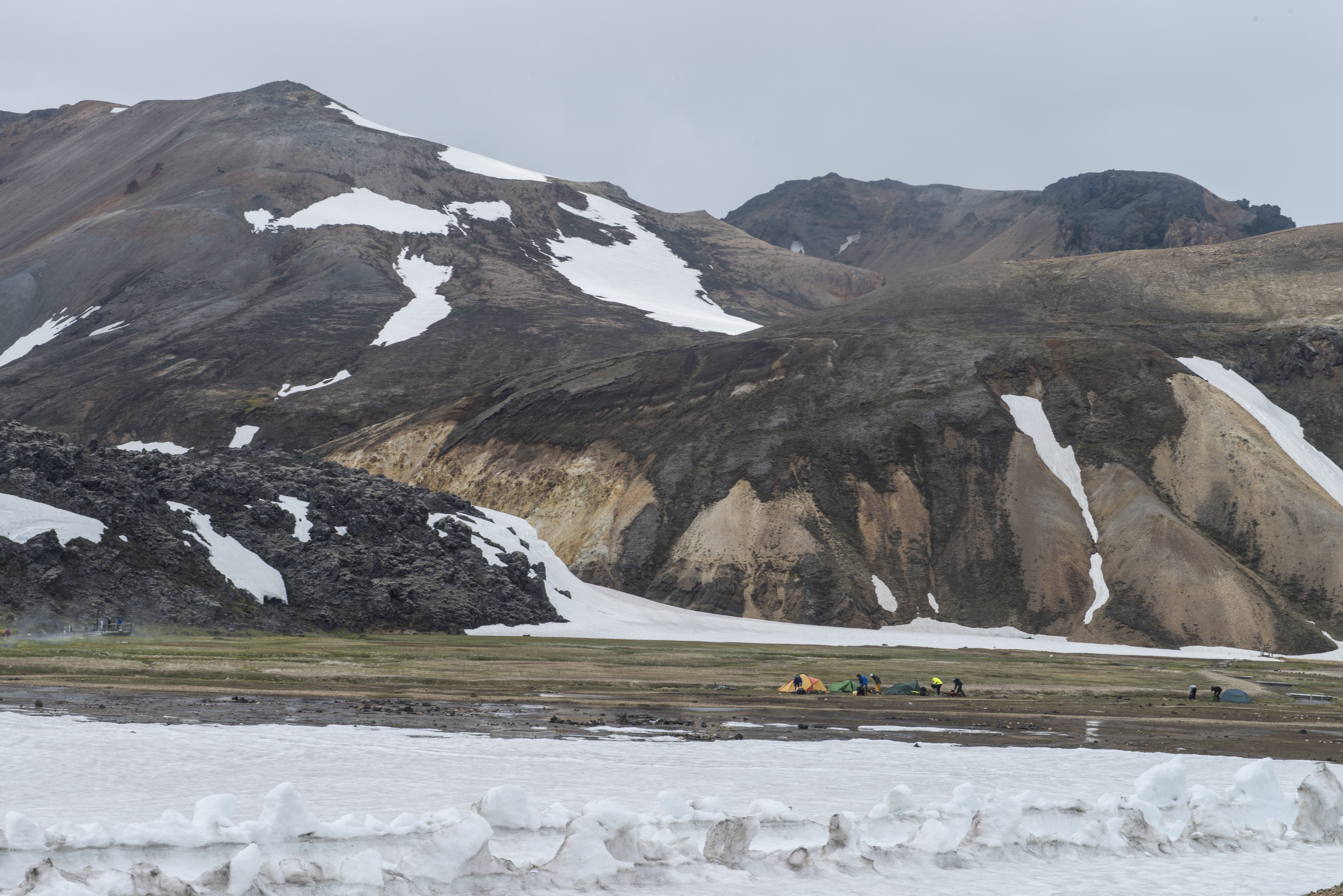
The campsite in the Landmannalaugar valley

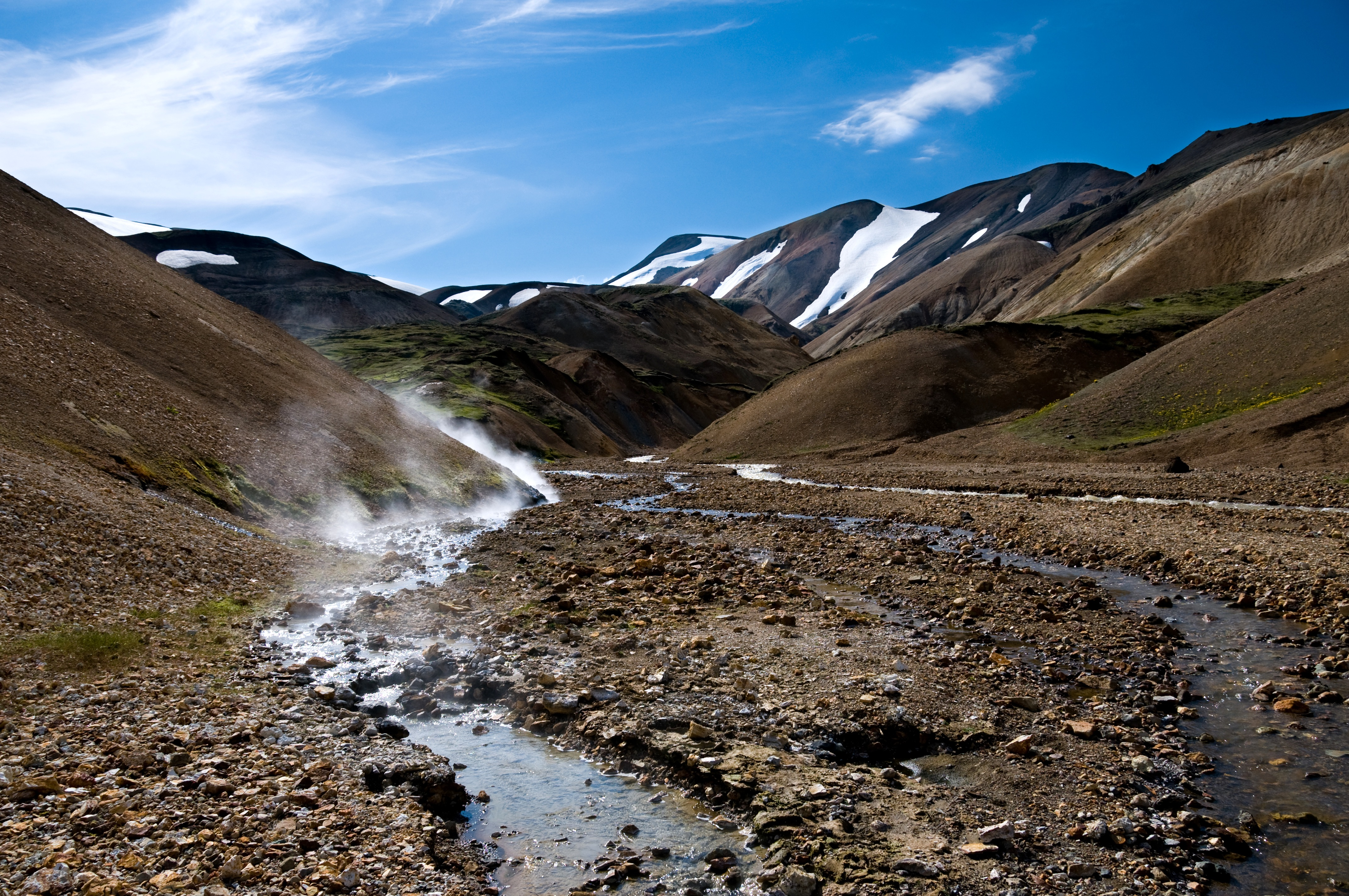
The mountain Háalda [ˈhauːˌalta] seen from Vondugil [ˈvɔntʏˌcɪːl̥]. The photo was taken a few kilometers west of the campsite in Landmannalaugar.

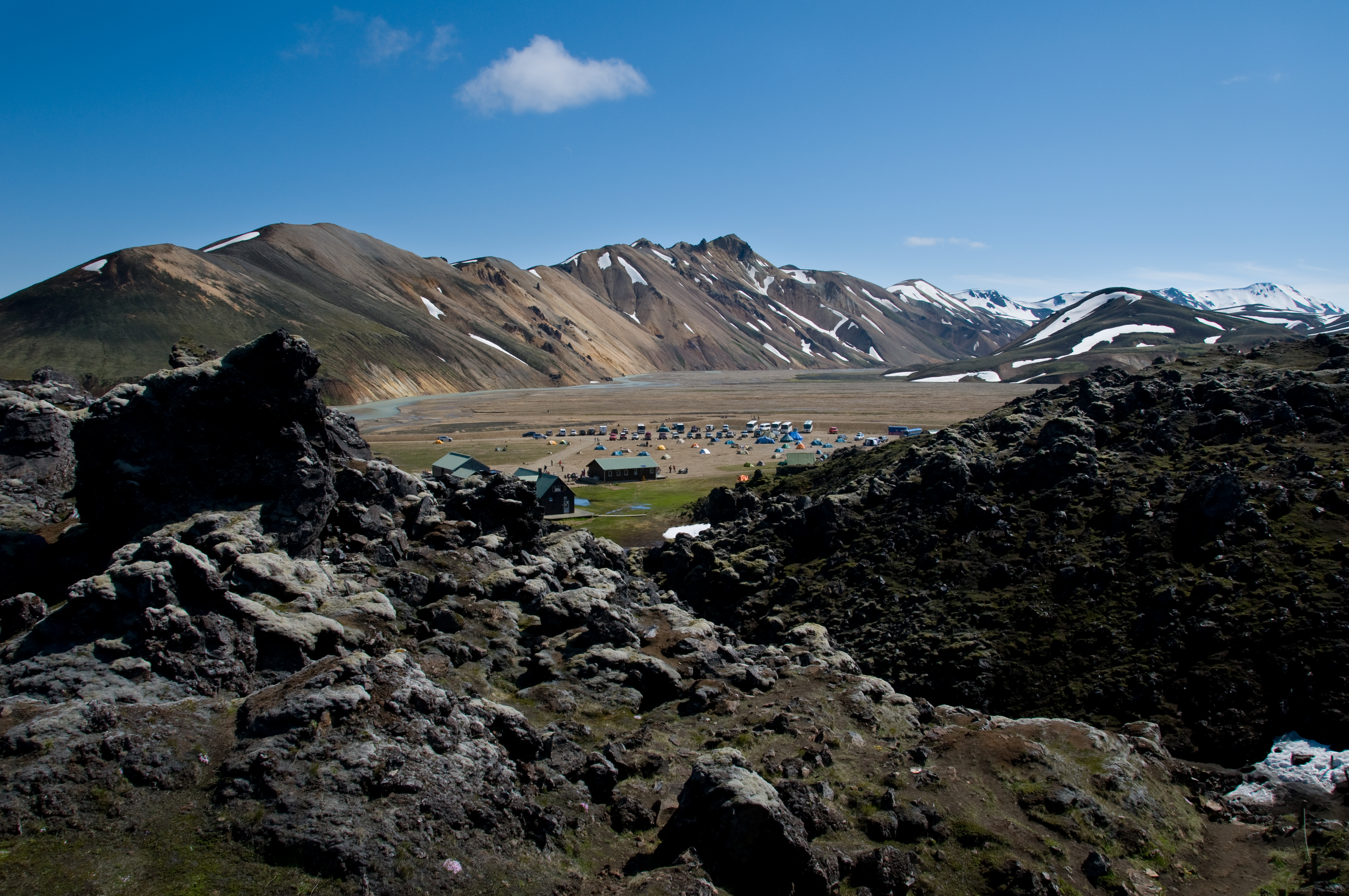
The camp site in Landmannalaugar

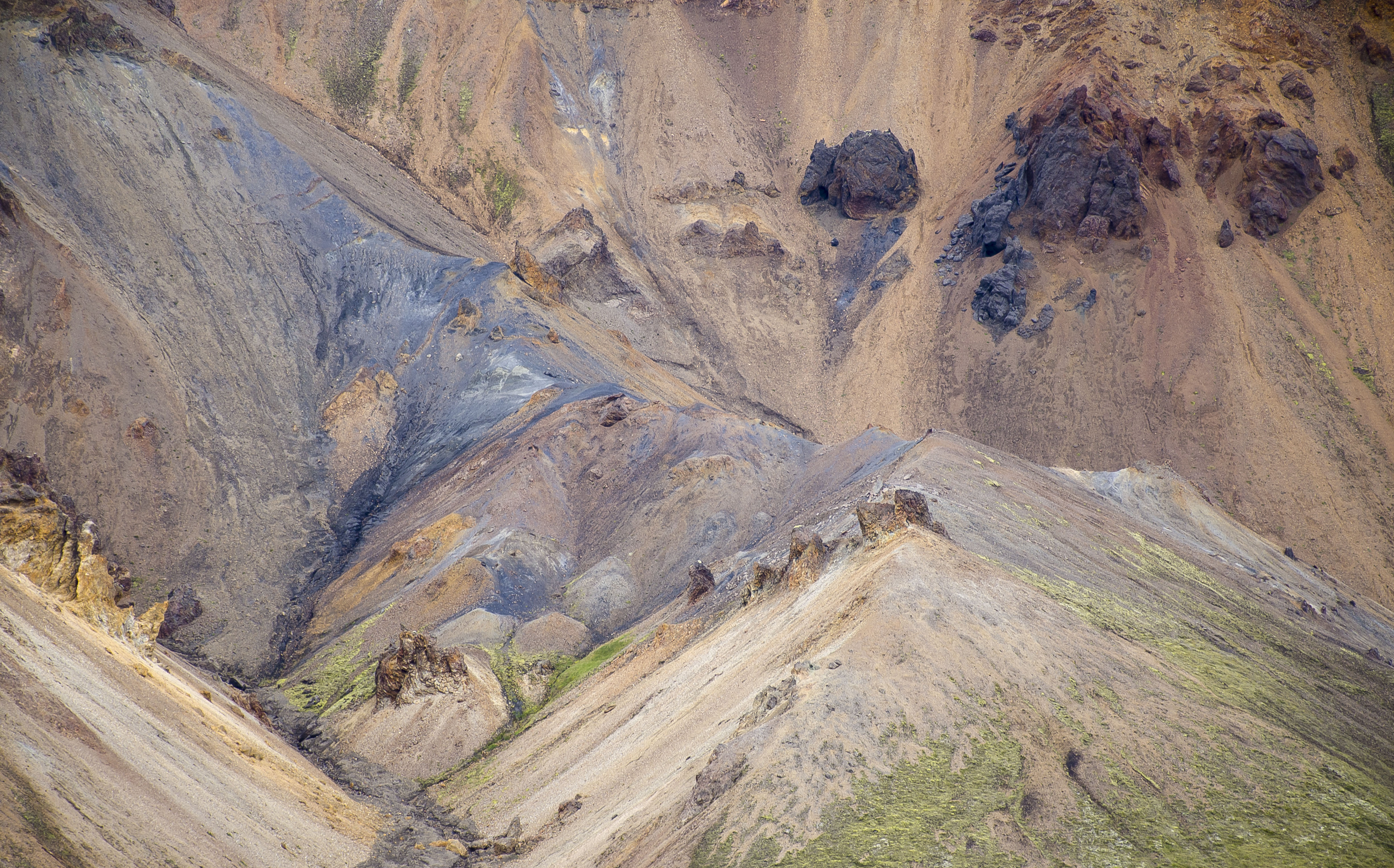
Landmannalaugar

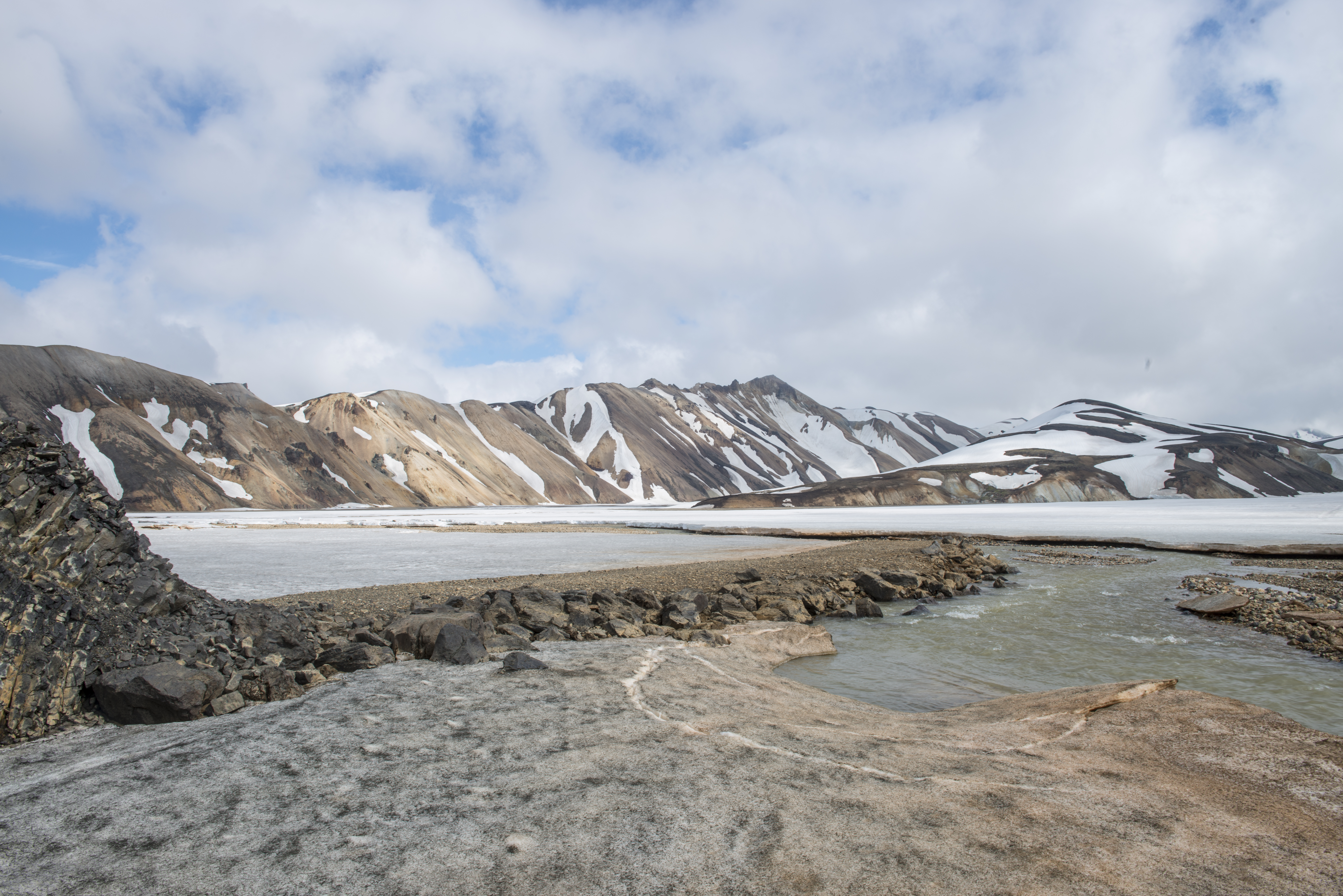
The mountains at Landmannalaugar

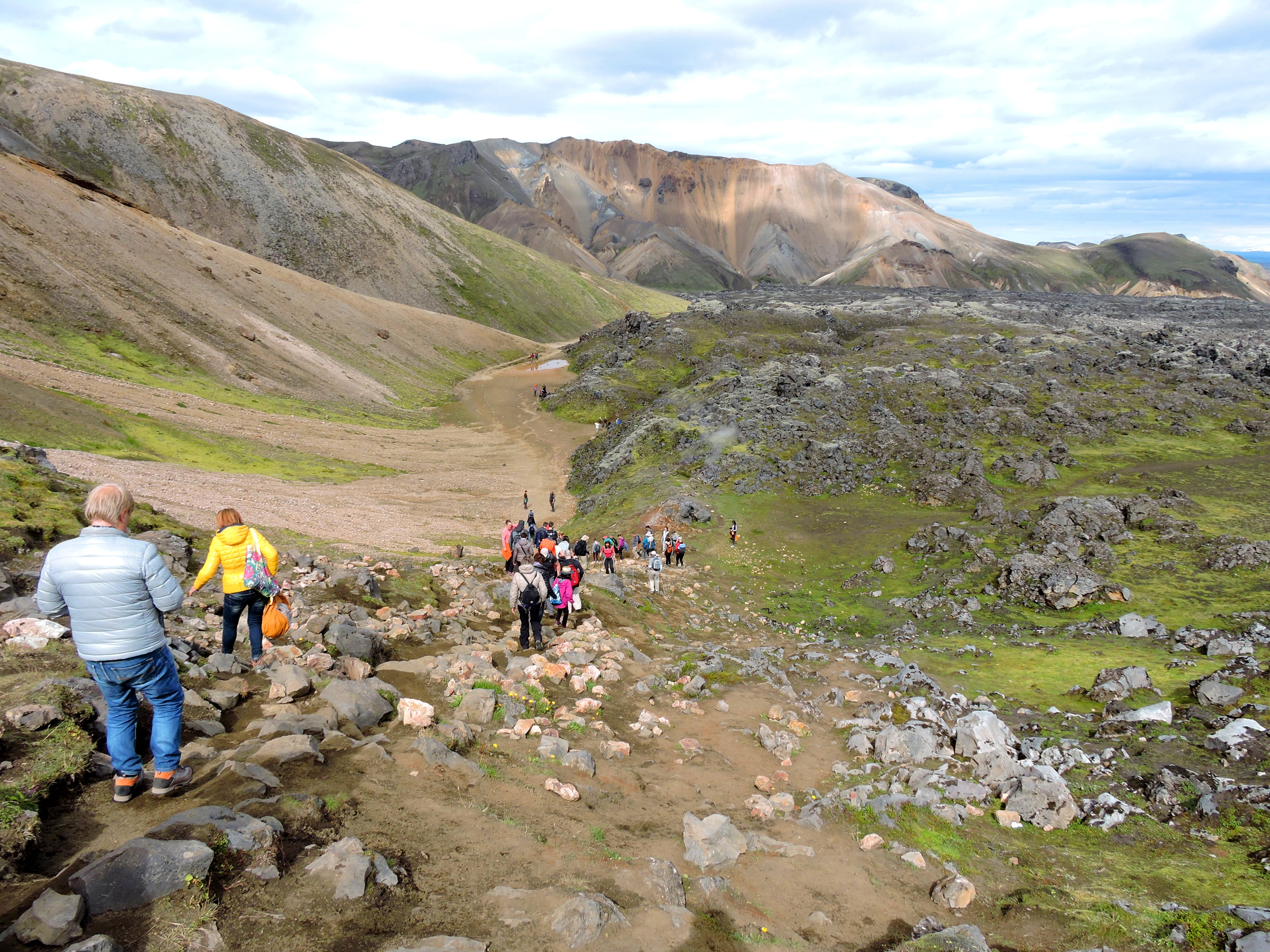
Hiking at Landmannalaugar

Landmannalaugar (Icelandic pronunciation: [ˈlantˌmanːaˌlœyːɣar̥]) is a location in Iceland's Fjallabak [ˈfjatlaˌpaːk] Nature Reserve in the Highland. It is on the edge of the Laugahraun [ˈlœyːɣaˌr̥œyːn] lava field. This lava field was formed by an eruption in approximately 1477. It is largely known for its natural geothermal hot springs and surrounding landscape.

Landmannalaugar is at the northern end of the Laugavegur hiking trail, and the Iceland Touring Association operates a mountain hut accommodating hikers.

== Activities ==
=== Hiking ===
Landmannalaugar is known for its hiking trails. Some routes include the hike through the Laugahraun [ˈlœiːɣaˌr̥œiːn] lava field to Brennisteinsalda ("Sulphur Wave"), the one-hour hike up Bláhnjúkur ("Blue Peak"), and the four-hour hike to Ljótipollur [ˈljouːtɪˌpʰɔtlʏr̥] crater lake ("Ugly Puddle"). Landmannalaugar can also be the starting point of several longer hiking trails, such as the Hellismannaleið [ˈhɛtlɪsˌmanːaˌleiːθ] route at the base of the Hekla volcano, and the Sprengisandur route for hikers prepared to travel through volcanic desert.

The huts on the Laugavegur and Fimmvörðuháls trails are (from north to south):

- Landmannalaugar
- Hrafntinnusker
- Álftavatn
- Hvanngil
- Emstrur
- Thórsmörk
- Fimmvörðuháls

=== Other activities ===
Icelandic horse riding has been available in the area each summer. The horse riding trips visit places such as Jökulgil [ˈjœːkʏlˌcɪːl̥] (Glacier Valley), that can often be difficult to access on foot and are inaccessible by car. Arctic char fishing is a common activity in Landmannalaugar and nearby lakes. Geothermal hot springs are also present in the area and can be publicly used for bathing. Cross-country skiing often takes place in the area during the winter.

=== Parking reservation ===
The Environment Agency has implemented a parking reservation system, beginning in the 2024 season. The system aims to reduce car traffic, as heavy traffic and limited parking has often led to heavy congestion and traffic knots. A limited number of reservations will be available in advance and a reservation will be needed daily between 8 AM and 3 PM during Summer.

== See also ==
- Volcanism of Iceland
