= Speed limits in Iceland =

Standard speed limits in Iceland

The general speed limit for cars in Iceland is 50 km/h (31 mph) in urban areas, 80 km/h (50 mph) on rural gravel roads and 90 km/h (56 mph) on paved rural roads. It is allowed to set higher speed limits up to 100 km/h (62 mph) if deemed safe and necessary for traffic flow but no road actually has higher than the 90 km/h (56 mph) limit. Some major urban highways well separated from pedestrians have higher limits of 60–80 km/h (37–50 mph). Lower limits are also implemented such as 30 km/h (19 mph) in residential areas.

Lorries and cars with trailers have a speed limit as signed in any given place but never higher than 90 km/h (56 mph). (as of 2024)

Iceland also has lower advisory speed limits, which are indicated by rectangular blue signs with white letters. They are mainly used in trouble spots on rural highways such as when approaching a sharp corner or a single-lane bridge.
