= Academic grading in Iceland =

In Iceland, a grade point average (GPA) is given as a weighted average of all grades in a marked period. Grades range from 0–10, where 10 is the highest, and the GPA is rounded off to two decimal points.

Term- and course grades are given on the scale of 0–10 with increments of 0.5.

For added convenience, grades are categorized as follows:

GPA	Name	Literal meaning
10–9.0	Framúrskarandi	First Grade with distinction
8.99–7.25	Fyrsta einkunn	First Grade
7.24–6.0	Önnur einkunn	Second Grade
5.99–5.0	Þriðja einkunn	Third Grade
