= Prostitution in Iceland =

Prostitution in Iceland is not illegal, but paying for sex is.

The police have stated that they do not have the resources to enforce the law. Consequently, a vigilante group called "Stóra systir" ("Big Sister") has been formed.

A report published in 2017 by the National Commissioner of the Icelandic Police states that prostitution had "exploded" in the previous 18 months. The vast majority of prostitutes in the country are foreign. Police believe prostitution in Iceland is partially tied to organised crime and human trafficking. The police have also stated that it is currently difficult for them to combat suspected human trafficking because the alleged victims often refuse to cooperate with the police and testify or file charges.

The country has become a sex tourism destination. According to the police report, prostitution often takes place in downtown Airbnb apartments.

== History ==
Before 2007, selling sex was illegal: according to the 206th article of the Icelandic Penal Code (almenn hegningarlög): "Anyone engaging in prostitution for own upkeep shall be subject to imprisonment for up to 2 years." That paragraph was deleted in 2007, as the "government argues most people who solicit sex do so because they have no other choice or because they are forced into prostitution by others. By making soliciting sex legal, the government believes individuals who have been forced into prostitution would rather come forward and lead police to those responsible." This move was supported by international women's groups.

In 2009, paying for sex was outlawed, criminalizing the clients, while selling sex remained decriminalized. The new law placed Iceland in line with Sweden and Norway, Canada also introduced a similar law in 2014.

== Nordic Model ==
In April 2009, the Icelandic Parliament passed new legislation that makes paying for sex illegal (the client commits a crime, but not the prostitute). Prostitutes, however, like in Sweden, still commit a crime if they work together as this constitutes "running a brothel". A 2007 poll demonstrated that "70% of Icelanders were in favour of criminalizing the buying of sex. There is a marked difference between the views of men and women; approximately 83% of women are in favour of a ban whilst 57% of men support a ban."

The original plan, by the then Minister of Social Affairs, Ásta Ragnheiður Jóhannesdóttir, included both prostitution and stripping. A strip club ban in Iceland has been in place since 2010. Jóhanna Sigurðardóttir, Iceland's former prime minister, who is openly lesbian, said: "The Nordic countries are leading the way on women's equality, recognizing women as equal citizens rather than commodities for sale." The politician behind the bill, Kolbrún Halldórsdóttir, said: "It is not acceptable that women or people in general are a product to be sold." The law is supported by Icelandic feminists. Internationally, radical feminists, such as Julie Bindel, have celebrated the ban as a landmark decision for feminism. Other bloggers disagree, arguing that it may drive the industry underground. Feminist views on prostitution vary.

== Legacy ==
There is little soliciting for street prostitution since the law came into effect. Many prostitutes have taken to advertising through dating websites, although the sites have a policy of removing suspicious profiles. Sex workers also find clients by word of mouth. Iceland's courts heard 20 cases relating to prostitution charges between the advent of the new law and April 2013. Most resulted in convictions, but the penalties are light and the names of some of those found guilty have been kept anonymous. Icelandic police say that a lack of cash and staff prevent them from rigorously enforcing the law.

== Sex trafficking ==
A US report concludes that Iceland is a destination and transit country for women subjected to sex trafficking. Women from Eastern Europe and South America are subjected to sex trafficking, often in nightclubs and bars. Traffickers reportedly exploit the visa-free regime in the Schengen Zone and the European Economic Area to bring victims to Iceland for up to three months and move them out of the country before they must register with local authorities.

Article 227a of the criminal code criminalises both sex trafficking and forced labor and prescribes penalties of up to 12 years imprisonment.

The United States Department of State Office to Monitor and Combat Trafficking in Persons downgraded Iceland's ranking in 2017 from a 'Tier 1' to a 'Tier 2' country.

== Additional links ==
- NIKK Nordic Gender Institute
- Prostitution in the Nordic Countries NIKK 17 Nov 2008
- Prostitution legislation: Will they go the same way? NIKK 19 March 2009
