= Búrfellshyrna =

Mountain in Iceland

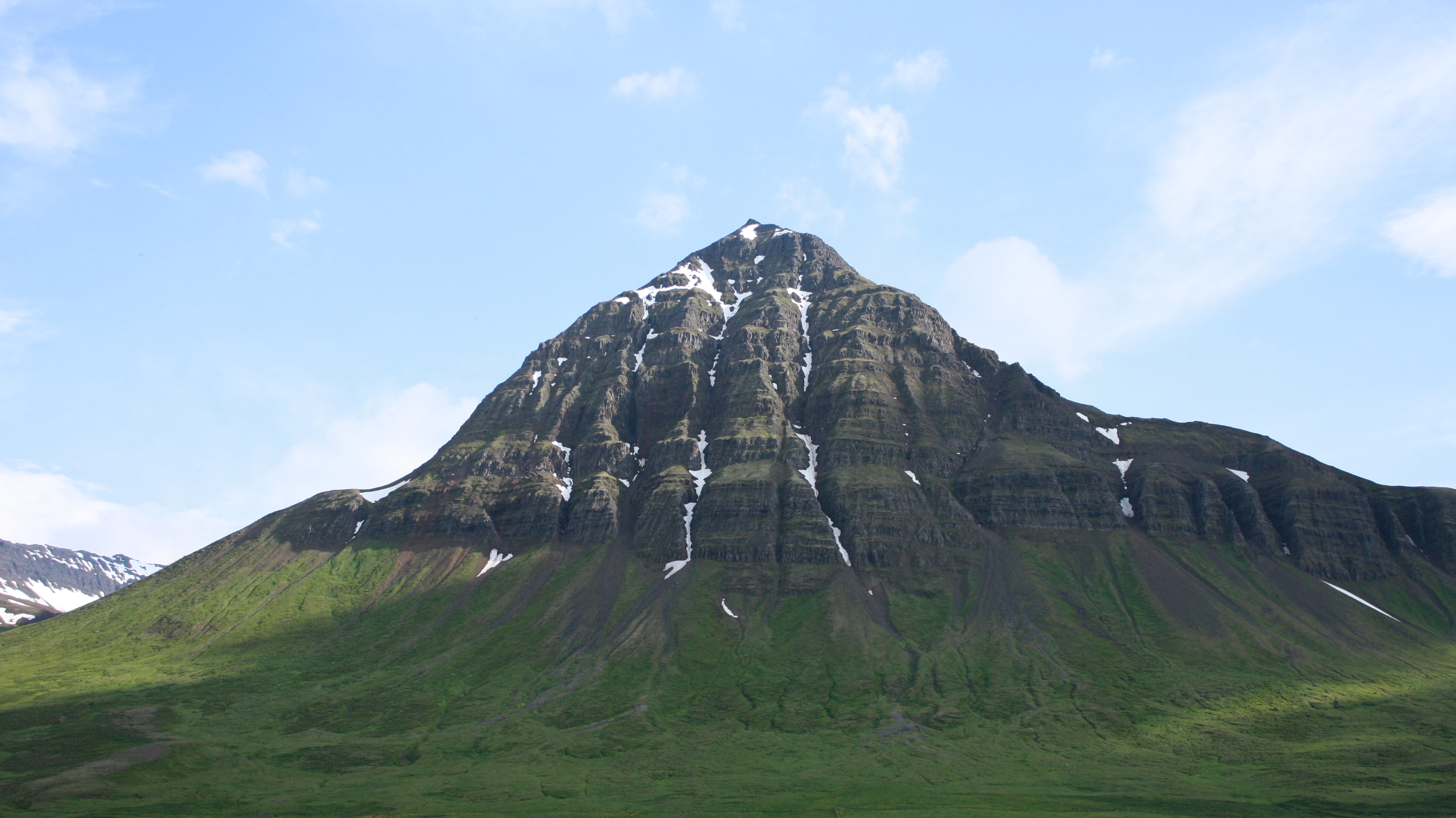

Highest point
- Elevation: 1,091 m (3,579 ft)
- Coordinates: 65°50′N 18°44′W

Naming
- Language of name: Icelandic

Geography
- Location within Iceland
- Location: Svarfaðardalur, Iceland

Búrfellshyrna (Icelandic pronunciation: [ˈpurˌfɛlsˌhɪ(r)tna]) is a mountain in the Svarfaðardalur in northern Iceland. It is made of basaltic layers of Tertiary age. It reaches 1,091 meters at its highest peak. It is situated between the valleys of Búrfellsdalur and Grýtudalur. In Búrfellsdalur is the Búrfell Glacier, which exhibits what is sometimes referred to as a glacier surge. Farms surrounding Búrfellshyrna include Búrfell and Hæringsstaðir.
