= 2010 Iceland power outages =

2010 widespread power outage in Iceland

The 2010 Iceland power outages was a massive, widespread power outage that occurred nationwide in Iceland, on Wednesday, September 1 to 21, 2010, at approximately 21:00 UTC. At the time, it was one of the most widespread electrical outages in Icelandic history. The three largest aluminium smelters in Iceland were hit by the outage, leaving Century Aluminum Grundartangi and Rio Tinto Alcan Straumsvík totally off-grid. The third aluminium smelter, Alcoa Fjarðarál, was forced to reduce its operations to a bare minimum. Hot water became immediately scarce in some of the neighborhoods in Reykjavík, the capital, 20 days fully restored.
