= Rock music in Iceland =

Rock and roll is a style of popular American music which has spread around the world, including to the North Atlantic island nation of Iceland.

== History ==
Rock came to the island beginning in the mid-1950s. Rock's popularity increased steadily over the next few years. This wave peaked with the tour by Tony Crombie & His Rockets in May 1957. A few bands with their own style did emerge, however, including City, Disco and Lúdó.

From 1930 until the mid-1980s, radio broadcasting in Iceland was a state monopoly which did not allow much time for rock music. But despite this state of affairs, Icelandic popular culture was not completely isolated from the outside world. Crews of Icelandic fishing boats and commercial aircraft would buy rock records in America, England and Germany and bring them back home to Iceland. Also, the US Navy base in Keflavík, Iceland, operated a radio station for the troops (AFRS 1484 on the radio dial) that mainly played rock music and was very popular with young Icelanders in the Reykjavík area and remained important to Icelandic rock music until at least the mid-1970s. Some of the disc-jockeys from the early '70s were Tom Wiecks, Jim Roark, Karl Phillips, Ron Smart, Tom Hughes and Mark Lazar.

The British Invasion and Beatlemania arrived in Iceland in 1964, and the indigenous groups Hljómar from Keflavík and Dátar from Reykjavík arose as Icelandic counterparts to The Beatles, later followed by Flowers, Bendix and other bands. Beginning in about 1969, the English language period of Icelandic rock began, with bands like Trúbrot, Náttúra and Pelikan becoming popular.

From 1973 to 1979, the Reykjavík rock scene was dominated by progressive rock and funk groups such as Eik and Cabaret (these two groups merged under the name Eik in 1977).

The mid to late 1970s saw the rise of Gunnar Þórðarson and Magnús Eiríksson, who revitalized the field of Icelandic rock and created a more distinctive national style. A wave of punk rock based out of Reykjavík occurred in about 1981 and temporarily displaced more traditional rock music, much like rock had displaced jazz in the early 1960s. Notable mid to late 1980s Icelandic rock bands include Grafík and Tobmobile as well as the alternative rock band The Sugarcubes featuring Björk. Towards the end of the 20th century and continuing to the present (2005), the group Quarashi with its mixture of rock and rap has achieved international attention; the same applies to the hard rock group Mínus and the post-rock band Sigur Rós. From the late 1980s continuing to the present (2005) the band Sálin hans Jóns míns or just Sálin has had a strong presence on the Icelandic rock scene.

Icelandic metal bands include Skálmöld and Auðn (took 3rd place at W:O:A Metal Battle at Wacken Open Air in 2016).

Iceland has competed in Eurovision Song Contest with rock songs; the metal singer Eiríkur Hauksson has competed for Iceland many times, including with a rock song, and the first time Iceland competed with a non-rock song, and he's a famous singer, for many types of music, also independently of Eurovision. The band Dimma was most recently voted second place in the national (Söngvakeppnin) selection process with a rock song, "Almyrkvi", sung in Icelandic (but lost to a non-rock song sung in English, that went viral despite the 2020 contest actually being cancelled because of COVID-19). Bubbi (who almost exclusively sings in Icelandic with the exception of the 1988 English-language album Serbian Flower), one of Iceland's most famous and prolific singer, starting with punk and rock bands, such as Egó, before going solo (and much later collaborated with Dimma) has said he would never compete in Eurovision, though he eventually did so in 2010 when he cowrote a song with Oscar Paul (who had written the song, sung by Yohanna, that placed second after Fairytale).
