= Banana production in Iceland =

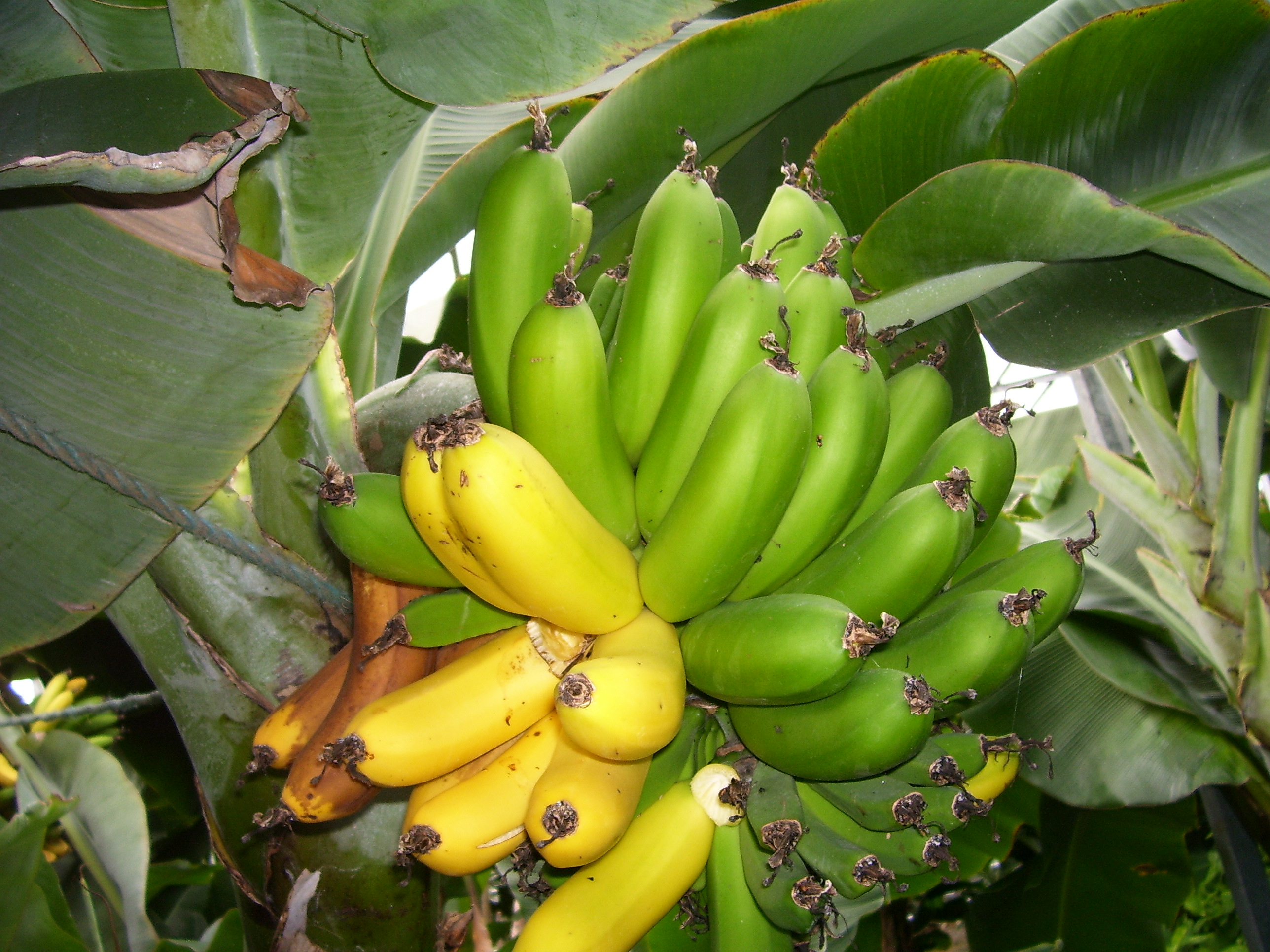
Bananas growing in a greenhouse in Iceland

Although Iceland is reliant upon fishing, tourism and aluminium production as the mainstays of its economy, the production of vegetables and fruit in greenhouses is a growing sector. Until the 1960s, this included commercial production of bananas.

In 1941, the first bananas in Iceland were produced. They have been produced since that time, about 100 clusters a year each weighing about 5–20 kg (11–44 lb), but are not currently sold. In the wake of World War II, the combination of inexpensive geothermal power (which had recently become available) and high prices for imported fruit led to the construction of a number of greenhouses where bananas were produced commercially from 1945 to as late as 1958 or 1959. In 1960, the government removed import duties on fruit. Domestically grown bananas were no longer able to compete with imported ones and soon disappeared from the market. Icelandic banana production was much slower due to low levels of sunlight; Icelandic bananas took two years to mature, while it only takes a few months near the equator.

The urban myth that Iceland is Europe’s largest producer or exporter of bananas has been propagated in various books and other media. It was mentioned in an episode of the BBC quiz programme QI and on a forum connected with the show. According to FAO statistics, the largest European producer of bananas is France (in Martinique and Guadeloupe), followed by Spain (primarily in the Canary Islands). Other banana-producing countries in Europe include Portugal (on Madeira), Greece (primarily in southern Crete), Cyprus, Turkey and Italy.

Although a small number of banana plants still exist in greenhouses and produce fruit every year, Iceland imports nearly all of the bananas consumed in the country, with imports now amounting to over 18 kg (40 lb) per capita per annum. The Agricultural University of Iceland maintains the last such farm with 600–700 banana plants in its tropical greenhouse, which were received as donations from producers when they shut down (then the Horticultural College). Bananas grown there are consumed by the students and staff and are not sold.
