= Icelandic weddings =

Wedding customs and traditions of Iceland

Icelandic weddings today still observe some traditional customs, such as seating by gender and the high table.

In Iceland co-habitation of a couple without a formal wedding has not carried as much stigma as elsewhere. It is not uncommon for people to marry after having been in a relationship together for years, even decades.

== Older traditions ==
Wedding feasts would commence over a number of days, depending on the status and wealth of the respective families. In the Icelandic Sagas the weddings are important functions where deals, friends and enemies are made.

== Modern weddings ==
=== The ceremony ===
Modern weddings usually consist of a 30-45 minute ceremony, generally held in a church but outdoor weddings have gained popularity and can be held where a suitable location is found. Offices of magistrates generally have very little room for guests but some do perform the ceremony at a location of the couple's choosing.

The invitations are usually sent by the couple themselves, but it is also customary for the parents of the couple to send out a joint invitation.

Traditionally men sit on the grooms side while women sit on the brides side. The father of the groom joins his son at the altar and they greet everyone who enters with a curt bow. The mothers greet the visitors as they enter the church itself in the foyer. Once the mothers take their seats the guests know that the bride has arrived, she is led by her father to the altar where they take their seats on the bride's side.

3-5 songs are performed by artists (possibly a choir) during the ceremony. Once the rings have been drawn upon the fingers and the couple declared man and wife, the bride returns to her seat and the groom and the father of the bride change their seats.

Once the ceremony is over the couple makes their way up the aisle, followed by their fathers who take their own wives in hand from the front pew. The guests then file out in seating order, with those at the front filing out first and then the next row and so on, couples usually walking hand in hand.

Immediately after the ceremony the bride and groom usually go away for an hour or so for a photo session. In the meantime, the invited guests make their way to the location of the reception and place their gifts on a designated table. The gifts are not opened until the next day. Receptions are commonly an all-evening affair with food, music, and dance but alternatively, the reception can be a much shorter one with coffee and cake offerings.

=== The reception ===
Once the newlyweds arrive an honorary toast is made before dinner commences. Immediately after dinner a couple of speeches are held. The bride and groom jointly cut the wedding cake (usually a multi-tier).

Once cake and coffee have been served the newlyweds dance the first dance together, traditionally a bridal waltz. After the first dance they are joined by their parents and next of kin and then other guests on the dancefloor.

The bride tosses her bouquet over her shoulder to the assembled unmarried women; the woman who catches it, superstition has it, will be the next to marry. The process is repeated for unmarried men with the groom tossing the bride's garter for the same purpose.
