= Brennisteinsalda =

Mountain in Iceland

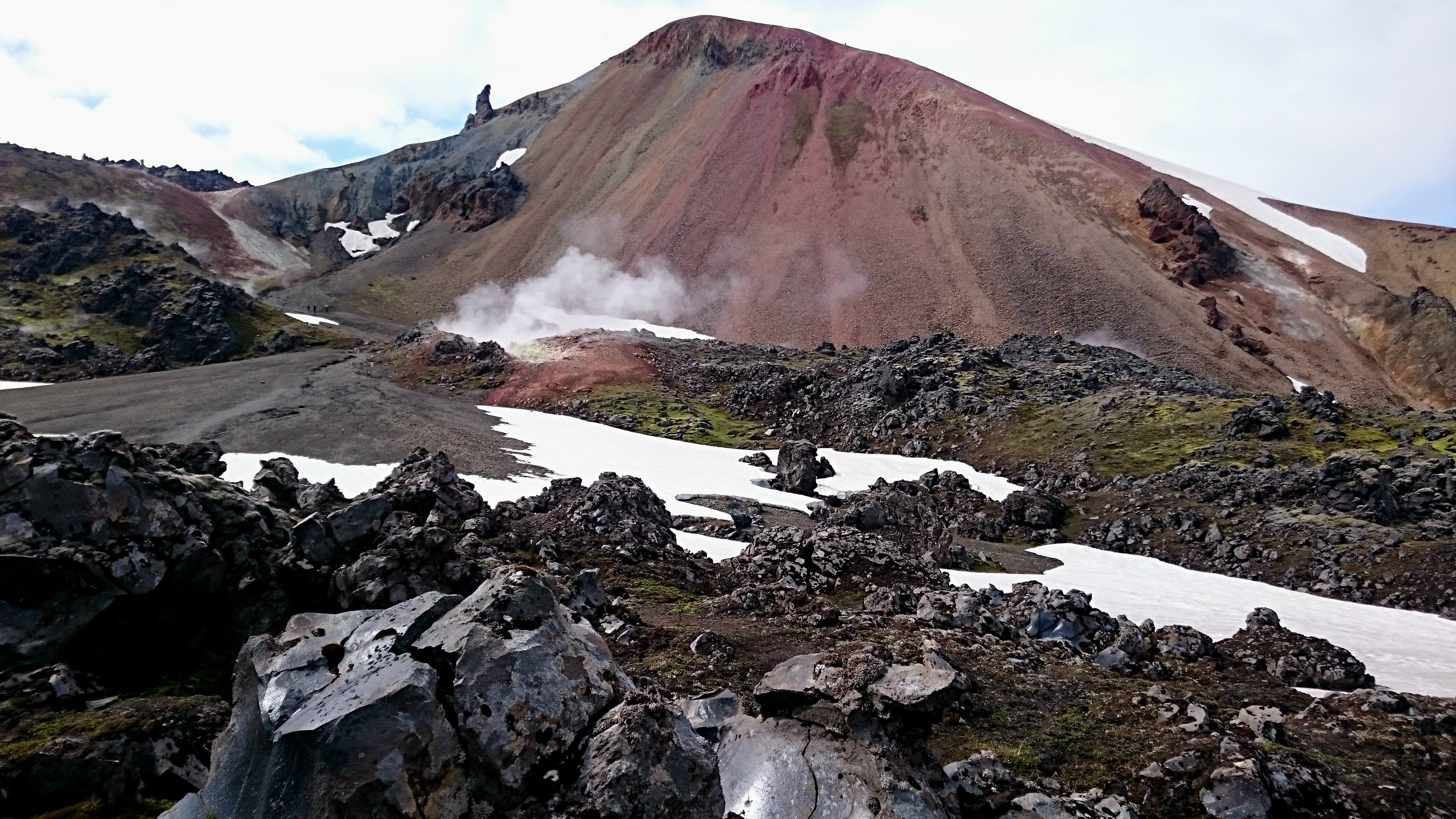

Highest point
- Elevation: 855 m (2,805 ft)
- Coordinates: 63°58′51″N 19°08′45″W

Naming
- English translation: sulphur wave
- Language of name: Icelandic

Geography
- Location within Iceland
- Location: Iceland

Geology
- Mountain type: Stratovolcano
- Last eruption: 1961

The Brennisteinsalda (Icelandic pronunciation: [ˈprɛnːɪˌsteinsˌalta]) is a volcano in the south of Iceland. Its height is about 855 m. It is situated near Landmannalaugar and not far from Hekla.

The name means in English: sulphur wave. It comes from the sulphur spots which have coloured its sides. But there are other colours, too: green from mosses, black and blue from lava and ashes, red from iron in the earth. It could very well be the most colourful mountain of Iceland and so its picture is often found in books and calendars.

The mountain is still visibly an active volcano with hot sulphur springs and vapour at its sides. The hiking trail Laugavegur [ˈlœyːɣaˌvɛːɣʏr̥] passes by. In front of it there is an obsidian lava field.

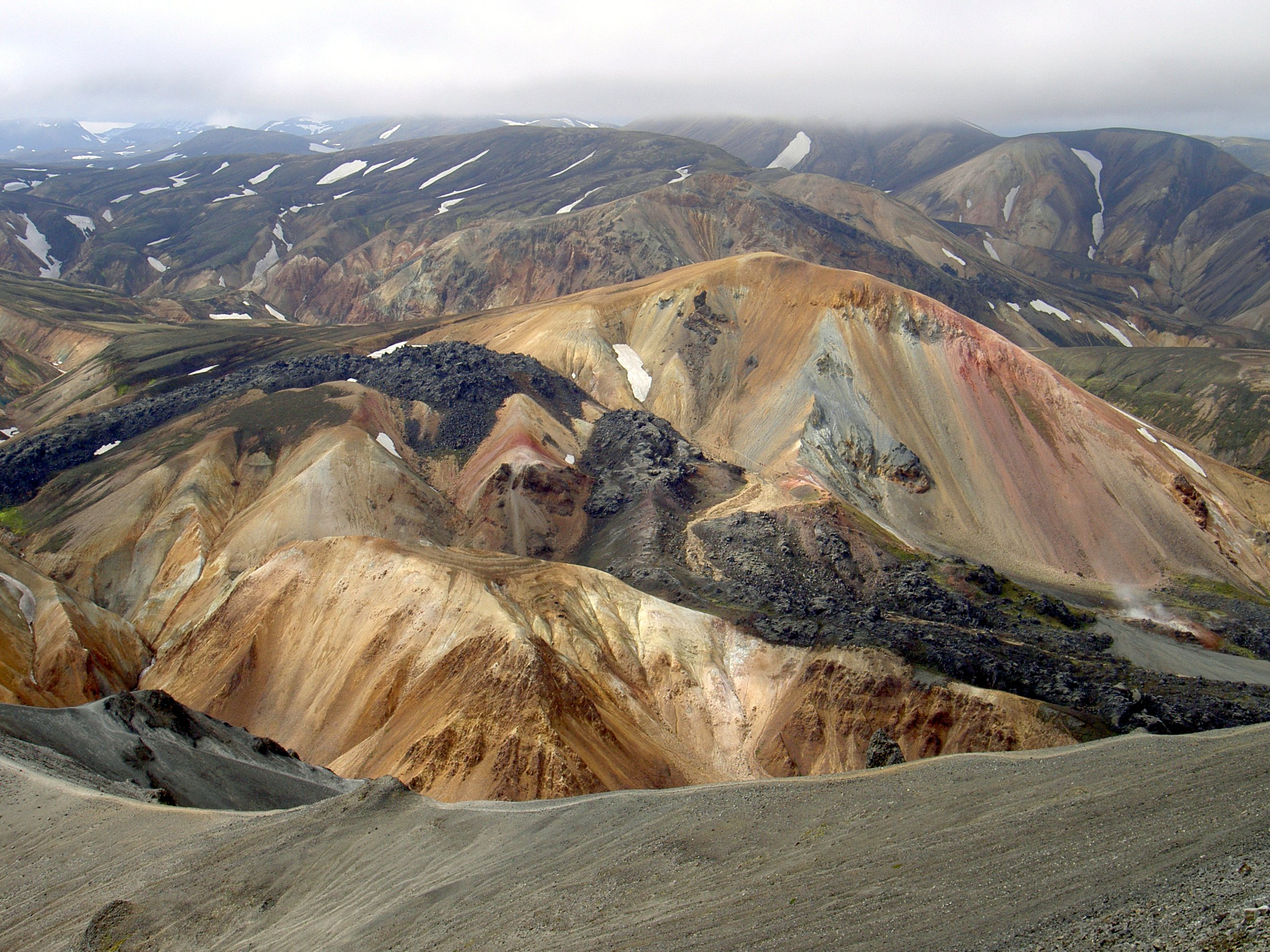
Landmannalaugar [ˈlantˌmanːaˌlœyːɣar̥] region
