= Military history of Iceland =

This is a brief overview of historical warfare and recent developments in Iceland. Iceland has never participated in a full-scale war or invasion and the constitution of Iceland has no mechanism to declare war.

== Settlement and commonwealth ==
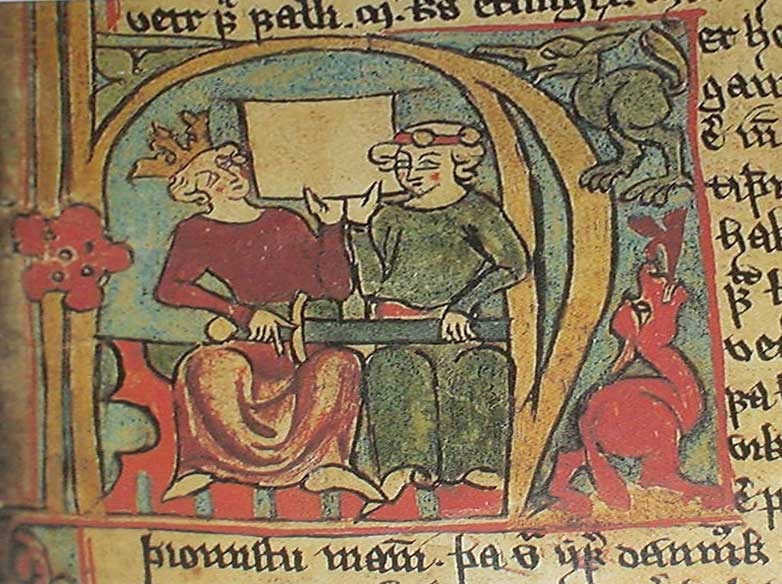
An illustration of Hákon, King of Norway, and Skule Bårdsson, from Flateyjarbók

In the period from the settlement of Iceland, in the 870s, until it became part of the realm of the Norwegian King, military defences of Iceland consisted of multiple chieftains (Goðar) and their free followers (þingmenn, bændur or liðsmenn) organised as per standard Nordic military doctrine of the time in expeditionary armies such as the leiðangr. These armies were divided into units by the quality of the warriors and birth. At the end of this period the number of chieftains had diminished and their power had grown to the detriment of their followers. This resulted in a long series of major feuds known as Age of the Sturlungs in the 13th century. During and before the war more than 21 fortresses were built.

The battle consisted of little less than 1000 men with the average casualty rate of 15%. This low casualty rate has been attributed to the blood-feud mentality that permeated Icelandic society, which meant that the defeated army could not be slaughtered honourably to a man. As well as the requirements of Christianity to get a pardon from a cleric for each fiend smitten, which resulted in only people of low class taking care of executions. While executions after battle were uncommon, they were extensive when they happened. See, for instance the battle of Haugsnes with about 110 fatalities, Flóabardagi with about 80 fatalities on one side and unknown on the other and the battle of Örlygsstaðir with up to 60 fatalities including executions. These three battles, or skirmishes as they would be called in a European context add up to 250 fatalities, so these three encounters alone add up to almost 6 of the average killings of 7 per year in the period 1220–1262. Years could pass without killings.

Amphibious operations were important parts of warfare in Iceland in this time, especially in the Westfjords, while large naval engagements were not common. The largest of these was an engagement of a few dozen ships in Húnaflói known as Flóabardagi. One side employing smaller longships as well as boats and the other large Knaars, other larger merchant ships and ferries. Although neither side expected to do battle at sea, the battle was fought in a fairly standard way for the time, the ships being bound together, starting with archery and rock throwing, then spear hurling and ending in a melee all over the fleet, ships being exchanged by each side many times.

At first the chieftains relied primarily on peasant levies but as the war progressed and Norwegian military influences became more pronounced, their personal retinues expanded and became more professional. At the end most of the chieftains had been slain and only one of the original chieftains who started the war remained. It had nonetheless become evident that no one chieftain was powerful enough to vanquish all the others and ensure peace. This led the Icelandic betri bændur (better farmers or farmer leaders) of the South, North and Western Iceland to submit to the Norwegian crown and the Alþingi in 1262. Two years later in 1264 the Lords of Eastern Iceland, the Svínfellingar, submitted as well, but the Eastern Region had completely escaped the ravages of war, mostly because of its geographical barriers of wastelands, mountains and glaciers.

== Union with Norway ==
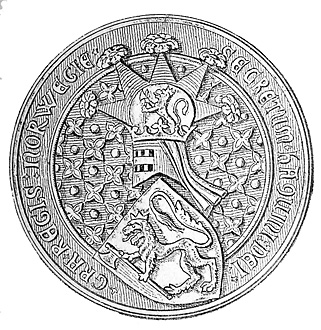
The Great Seal of King Hákon V

Peace barely ensued as the Norwegian King had little capacity to enforce his will over the Atlantic Ocean, his navy, although the most powerful Atlantic navy at the time was too small to carry big enough invasion force all the way to Iceland. The native Nobles continued to maintain their elite troops, which were called sveinalið while the sýslumenn (sheriffs), most of which were noble descendants of the chieftains, maintained soldiers or sveinar for the defence duties that had been delegated to them by law. All inhabitants of a sýslumaður´s fief were obligated to follow them in battle against invaders.

The king rarely asked for expeditionary forces to help defend Norway, although Icelanders in Norway had been obligated to help Norwegian defences since the early 12th century. There are however a few documented occasions of Icelandic expeditionary armies coming to the king's aid.

As the church became more powerful its bishops and priests became more militant: at the peak of their power the two bishops could command armies consisting of over 6% of Iceland's total population. The Bishops' own sveinar could expect to become priests after their military service. The two bishops became de facto Ecclesiastical Counts or Kirkjugreifar, responsible for law enforcement and overall command of military defences. Icelandic noblemen became wary of the Bishops' powers in the late 15th century and protested. During the 15th century, when English traders and fishermen started to come to Iceland, it became a common practice among chieftains to buy cannons for defence against foreign ships and for internal conflicts. Other firearms, such as the hand gonne, known as haki or hakbyssa in Iceland, became popular as well.

== Lutheranism ==
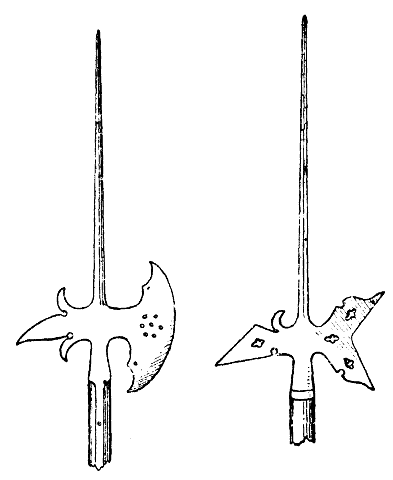
The Atgeir (halberd). A signature weapon of Icelandic farmers since the late 16th century.

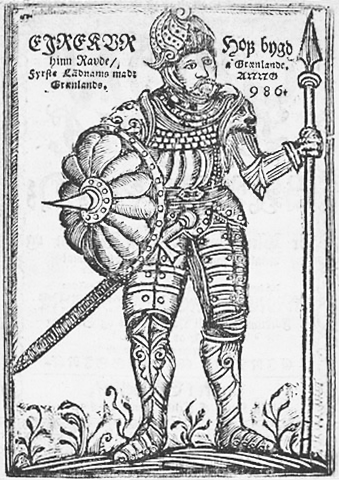
16th century Icelandic man-at-arms. Picture is to depict Eiríkr Rauði, who is equipped somewhat anachronistically, from the 17th century book Groenlandia by Arngrímur Jónsson.

Since the king of Denmark had embraced Lutheranism in the early 16th century he had campaigned to convert his realms from Catholicism to Lutheranism. In the 1540s it was Iceland's turn: a Lutheran bishop was elected as the bishop of Skálholt diocese and bitter conflict ensued. Although the bloodshed didn't come close to that in the Civil War fought in the 13th century, it was still considerable as the bishops fielded armies of thousands, and even fought at Alþingi.

In a bid to isolate Skálholt, Iceland's last Catholic bishop, Jón Arason of Hólar, attempted to cut its lines of communication to the Westfjords by invading the lands of Daði Guðmundsson. Although initially successful in capturing Sauðafell he was later defeated by Daði's army and captured with his sons. Jón Arason and his sons were then transported to Skálholt and beheaded there in 1550. A year later a Danish mercenary force mostly consisting of Landsknechts arrived to support the policy of conversion. Although no open warfare continued, the Danish king was still wary of an insurrection and ordered the destruction of all Icelandic arms and armor. Further mercenary armies, consisting of Landsknechts, are sent to carry out these orders over the following years. After that starts a period where Royal Danish forces are responsible for the defence of Iceland. The Royal Dano-Norwegian Navy patrols the coasts of Iceland, but mostly to prevent illegal trading rather than piracy. Some Icelandic sheriffs, however, manage to continue to maintain considerable retinues, especially in the Westfjords, where the Landsknechts were not as thorough in their search.

== Pirate raids ==
The lack of weaponry among Icelanders made them more vulnerable to pirate attacks than before, although in some places, such as the aforementioned Westfjords, Icelanders managed to massacre foreign pirates. Icelandic officials complained about the raids in letters to the king and as a result many halberds were sent to Iceland by Royal edict. The halberd, known as atgeir or arngeir in Icelandic, became a signature weapon of Icelandic farmers. The king remained wary of the Icelanders, and refused to supply them with firearms. As most of the pirates were well armed with such weapons it made defence difficult. However some old guns and cannons still remained and could be used against their ships.

In 1627 Icelanders were shocked at the inability of the Danish forces to protect them against Barbary corsairs who murdered and kidnapped a large number of people. In some places Danish troops fled from the raiders, but the Captain (Höfuðsmaður) of Iceland, who was the highest-ranking military officer and overall governor of Iceland, managed to defend Bessastaðir by hastily building fortifications and damaged one of the raiding ships severely with cannon fire. Some Icelanders were nonetheless angered that he didn't sink the ship despite it being stuck for 24 hours on a reef in front of the fortifications. As a result, Icelanders formed local militias with the king's blessing in places such as Vestmannaeyjar.

== 18th and 19th centuries ==
Regimental Standard of the Herfylking

In the decades before the Napoleonic Wars, the few hundred militiamen in the southwest of Iceland were mainly equipped with rusty and mostly obsolete medieval weaponry, including 16th-century halberds. When British privateers arrived in 1808, after most of the Royal Dano-Norwegian Navy had been captured or destroyed in the battle of Copenhagen in 1807, the amount of gunpowder in Iceland was so small that the governor of Iceland, Frederich Christopher Trampe, Count of Trampe, could not offer any resistance.

In 1855, the sheriff in Vestmannaeyjar, Andreas August von Kohl (nicknamed Captain Kohl), went to the Danish authorities to request the formation of an armed civilian militia in Vestmannaeyjar. The main reasons were lingering fears from the Turkish Abductions, and other fears of foreign fishermen. In 1856, the king provided 180 rixdollars to buy guns, and a further 200 rixdollars the following year. After the second delivery in 1857, the militia was officially established, and became known as Herfylkingin, "The Battalion". It was modeled after the Danish army, and divided into four 15-man battalions, each with their own commander. Additionally, there were two youth wings intended for boys from the ages 8-16. The militia would meet once or twice a week for 2-4 hour exercises, where they would practice shooting, swordplay, tactics, and occasionally mock battles. Members were also encouraged to keep themselves in shape and read books from the public library. There was no standardized uniform, however, all members wore a blue hat with a red dot on it. The militia never saw battle, but its presence ensured that foreign fishermen behaved themselves when they made landfall on the islands, as they had been notorious for causing havoc when landing on the island. In 1860 Captain Kohl died, and Pétur Bjarnasen took over command. The Militia went on a steady decline, until in 1869 when Pétur Bjarnasen died without appointing a successor, and the militia ceased to exist.

Many have campaigned for an Icelandic standing army since the late 19th century, including Iceland's Independence hero Jón Sigurðsson, but except for the attempt in 1940 it has amounted to little.

== Independence ==
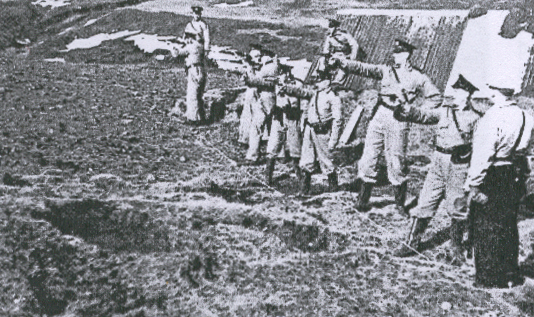
Agnar Kofoed Hansen training his officers in the art of war in 1940

In 1918 Iceland regained sovereignty as a separate Kingdom ruled by the Danish king. Iceland established a Coast Guard shortly after, but financial difficulties made establishing a standing army impossible. The government hoped that permanent neutrality would shield the country from invasions. But at the onset of the Second World War, the government, becoming justifiably nervous, decided to expand the capabilities of the National Police (Ríkislögreglan) and its reserves into a military unit. Chief Commissioner of Police Agnar Kofoed Hansen had been trained in the Danish Air Force and he moved swiftly to train his officers. Weapons and uniforms were acquired and near Laugarvatn they practiced rifle shooting and military tactics. Agnar barely managed to train his 60 officers before the United Kingdom invaded Iceland on May 10, 1940. The next step in the drive towards militarisation was to have been the training of the 300 strong reserve forces, but the invasion effectively stopped it.

== Cod Wars ==
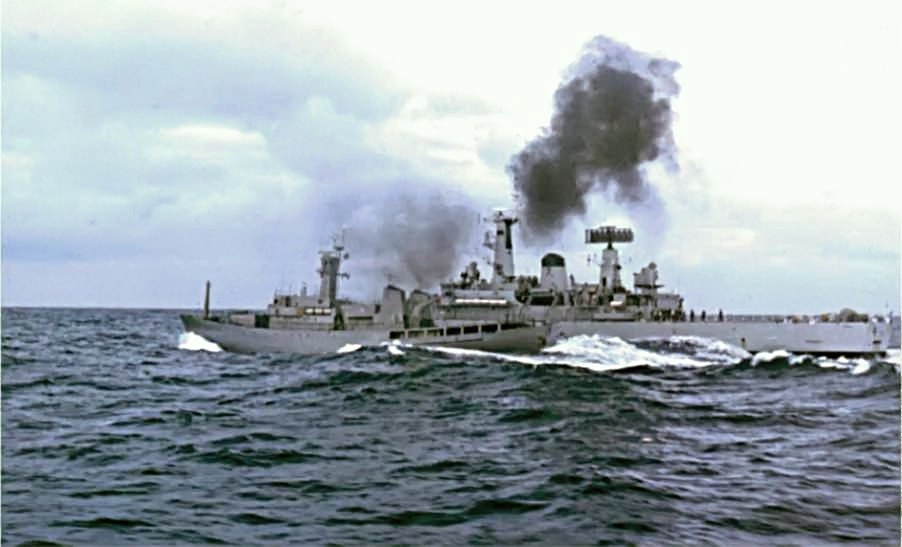
Confrontation between the frigate HMS Scylla and the Icelandic gunboat Odinn (1976)

The Cod Wars, also called the Icelandic Cod Wars (Icelandic: Þorskastríðin, "the cod war", or Landhelgisstríðin, "the war for the territorial waters"), were a series of three confrontations from the 1950s to the 1970s between the United Kingdom and Iceland over fishing rights in the North Atlantic. None of the Cod Wars meet any of the common thresholds for a conventional war, and they may more accurately be described as militarised interstate disputes.

The First Cod War lasted from 1 September until 12 November 1958. It began as soon as a new Icelandic law that expanded the Icelandic fishery zone from 4 to 12 nautical miles (7.4 to 22.2 km; 4.6 to 13.8 mi), came into force at midnight of 1 September. After a number of rammings and a few shots fired between the Royal Navy and Icelandic patrol boats, Britain and Iceland came to a settlement, which stipulated that any future disagreement between Iceland and Britain in the matter of fishery zones would be sent to the International Court of Justice in the Hague. The First Cod War saw a total of 37 Royal Navy ships and 7,000 sailors protecting the fishing fleet from six Icelandic gunboats and their 100 coast guards.

The Second Cod War between the United Kingdom and Iceland lasted from September 1972 until the signing of a temporary agreement in November 1973. In 1972, Iceland unilaterally declared an exclusive economic zone (EEZ) extending beyond its territorial waters, before announcing plans to reduce overfishing. It policed its quota system with the Icelandic Coast Guard, leading to a series of net-cutting incidents with British trawlers that fished the areas. As a result, the Royal Navy deployed warships and tugboats to act as a deterrent against any future harassment of British fishing crews by the Icelandic craft, resulting in direct confrontations between Icelandic patrol vessels and British warships, which again included ramming incidents. After a series of talks within NATO, British warships were recalled on 3 October 1973. An agreement was signed on 8 November which limited British fishing activities to certain areas inside the 50 nmi (93 km; 58 mi) limit, resolving the dispute that time. The resolution was based on the premise that British trawlers would limit their annual catch to no more than 130,000 tons. This agreement expired in November 1975, and the third "Cod War" began.

The Third Cod War lasted from November 1975 to June 1976. Iceland had declared that the ocean up to 200 nmi (370 km; 230 mi) from its coast fell under Icelandic authority. The British government did not recognise this large increase to the exclusion zone, and as a result, there were again almost daily rammings between Icelandic patrol vessels and British trawlers, frigates and tugboats. The dispute eventually ended in 1976 after Iceland threatened to close a major NATO base in retaliation for Britain's deployment of naval vessels within the disputed 200 nmi (370 km; 230 mi) limit. The British government conceded, and agreed that after 1 December 1976 British trawlers would not fish within the previously disputed area.

== NATO and the Cold War ==
Iceland's main contribution to the NATO defence effort, during the Cold War was the rent-free provision of the "agreed areas"—sites for military facilities. By far the largest and most important of these was the NATO Naval Air Station Keflavík, staffed by American, Canadian, Danish, Norwegian and Dutch personnel. Units from these and other NATO countries also are deployed temporarily to Keflavík, and they stage practice operations. Many of these practices were anti-submarine warfare patrols, but these exercises were halted when the P-3 ASW aircraft were withdrawn from Keflavík.

Iceland and the United States regarded the U.S. military presence since World War II as a cornerstone to bilateral foreign/security policy. The presence of the troops was negotiated under a treaty known as the Agreed Minute.

Talks about the American presence were restarted as of 2005, since the U.S. government was keen on deploying its troops and equipment to parts of the world with more pressing need for them. Proposals by the Icelandic government included a complete Icelandic takeover of the Airbase, as well as replacing the Pavehawk rescue helicopter unit with a detachment from the aeronautical half of the Icelandic Coast Guard, in exchange for the continued stationing of the four F-15C interceptors in Keflavík.

On March 15, 2006 the U.S. government announced that the Iceland Defense Force would be withdrawn by the end of September 2006. The last American troops left on September 30, handing control of the Keflavík base over to the Sheriff of Keflavík airport, who was to be in charge of it on behalf of the Ministry for Foreign Affairs.

== American withdrawal ==
On September 26, 2006 the Government of Iceland released a document containing Iceland's response to the withdrawal of American forces. It included plans (a) to create a Security and Defense authority to oversee all security organisations in Iceland, including Police and Coast Guard; (b) to increase the capabilities of the Coast Guard by purchasing vessels and aircraft; (c) to create a Security or Secret service; and (d) to establish a secure communications system spanning the whole country. MP Magnús Þór Hafsteinsson of the Liberal party voiced his party's willingness to raise a standing army, in agreement with views expressed by Björn Bjarnason Minister of Justice and Ecclesiastical affairs.

The Icelandic Defence Agency (Varnarmálastofnun Íslands) was founded in 2008 under the Minister for Foreign Affairs. The Agency was to consolidate functions previously served by NATO forces at Naval Air Station Keflavik, such as maintaining defense installations, intelligence gathering and military exercises. An initial budget of $20 million fell to $13 million in 2009 as the Icelandic economy suffered a crisis. On 30 March 2010, the Icelandic government announced it would legislate to disband the Agency and put its services under the command of the Coast Guard or National Police. To save money and to restore the primary role of the Icelandic Coast Guard in defense, the Defence Agency was shut down on January 1, 2011.

Iceland Air Meet 2014 hosted NATO and other Nordic countries for the first time.

== See also ==
- Battle of Víðines
- Battle of Örlygsstaðir
- Battle of the Gulf
- Battle of Haugsnes
- Battle of Sauðafell
- Borgarvirki
- Defence of Iceland
- History of Iceland
- List of countries without armed forces
- List of wars involving Iceland
