= Crime in Iceland =

- Homicide: 2.0 (2024)
- Assault: 49.8 (2023)
- Burglary: 296.9 (2024)
- Theft: 977.1 (2024)
- Fraud: 121.5 (2024)
- Money laundering: 53.1 (2024)
- Rape: 45.4 (2023)
- Sexual violence: 130.0 (2023)
- reported per 100,000 inhabitants

Crime in Iceland is regulated primarily by the Almenn hegningarlög (General Penal Code) No. 19/1940 and the Lög um meðferð sakamála (Criminal Procedure Act) No. 88/2008. Day-to-day policing is carried out by the Icelandic police (lögreglan) under the Police Act No. 90/1996. Statistics on recorded crime and imprisonment are published by Statistics Iceland (Hagstofa Íslands) and the National Commissioner of the Icelandic Police (Ríkislögreglustjóri).

Multiple comparative indices consistently rank Iceland among the safest and most peaceful countries in the world. The Global Peace Index 2025 lists Iceland as the most peaceful country, a position it has held since 2008; the report notes that Iceland ranks first in the Safety and Security domain and describes it as the world's safest country in 2025. Other composite rankings similarly place Iceland at or near the top for overall safety; for example, Global Finance ranked Iceland first in its Top 100 Safest Countries list.

== Legal framework ==
The legal basis of criminal law in Iceland is the Almenn hegningarlög No. 19/1940, which define offences and penalties. Procedure is governed by the Lög um meðferð sakamála No. 88/2008; the organization and remit of the police are set out in the Lögreglulög No. 90/1996.

=== Institutions ===
The National Commissioner of the Icelandic Police (Ríkislögreglustjóri) publishes national crime statistics and strategic assessments and coordinates specialist capabilities. Individual police districts handle investigations and public order. National cyber-incident response is provided by CERT-IS (Netöryggissveit Íslands) under the electronic communications regulator, which issues alerts and annual reviews of cyber incidents.

== Crime statistics ==
Statistics Iceland maintains the series Afbrot og afplánun and provides open data on recorded offences and imprisonment. The police publish annual national tables (2001–2024) and topic dashboards (e.g. domestic and sexual offences). As examples of published topical figures, police reported 2,379 domestic-violence notifications nationwide in 2024 and 279 sexual-offence reports in the first half of 2024 (≈11% fewer than the three-year average). Methodological guidance in Icelandic sources stresses that recorded-crime counts reflect reported incidents and should be interpreted with population-adjusted rates and victimisation context.

== Types of crime ==
=== Organised crime and economic crime ===
The police analysis unit's assessment on organised crime describes it as a high-impact multi-agency threat in Iceland. Government notices summarising earlier risk assessments have characterised the overall risk level as gífurleg áhætta (very high). In June 2025, authorities announced expanded inter-agency cooperation against organised crime targeting the public sector.

=== Drug offences ===
Icelandic police regularly publicise significant drug seizures, including large cocaine and prescription-opioid consignments, reflecting the country's role as a transit and consumer market in the North Atlantic region.

=== Cybercrime and online threats ===
CERT-IS coordinates incident response and public warnings in Iceland. In May 2023, the media reported distributed-denial-of-service attacks affecting Icelandic websites, including the Althingi site; CERT-IS commented publicly on the incidents.

=== Gender-based violence ===
The police publish regular statistical updates on domestic violence and sexual offences; 2,379 domestic-violence notifications were registered in 2024 and sexual-offence notifications fell in the first half of 2024 relative to the three-year average. Reykjavík police and the city operate the long-running partnership Saman gegn ofbeldi (Together against violence) which publishes monthly data for Reykjavík.

=== Human trafficking ===
Icelandic authorities publish information on anti-trafficking measures, action plans and victim support; policy updates in 2019–2024 emphasise improved procedures and support for victims.

As of 2010, Iceland is a destination and transit country for women subjected to human trafficking, specifically forced prostitution. Some reports maintained Iceland also may have been a destination country for men and women who were subjected to conditions of forced labor in the restaurant and construction industries. A 2009 Icelandic Red Cross report claimed that there were at least 59 and possibly as many as 128 cases of human trafficking in Iceland over the previous three years; female victims of human trafficking in Iceland came from Eastern Europe, Russia, Africa, South America and Southeast Asia. Foreign women working in Iceland's strip clubs or in brothels have been vulnerable to sex trafficking. According to the Red Cross report, undocumented foreign workers - mostly from Eastern Europe - in Iceland's manufacturing and construction industries were vulnerable to forced labor.

Iceland prohibits trafficking for both sexual exploitation and forced labor through Section 227 of its criminal code. In December 2009, parliament amended the definition of trafficking in the code to align it with the international definition under the 2000 UN TIP Protocol. Iceland ratified the it in June 2010. Punishments prescribed for trafficking under Section 227 range up to eight years’ imprisonment, which are sufficiently stringent though not commensurate with penalties prescribed for other serious crimes such as rape. Actual sentences for trafficking offenders have been commensurate with rape sentences. The government has funded formal anti-trafficking training (including some training abroad) for all employees of the Ministry for Foreign Affairs and some police and airport officials.

In an effort to reduce the demand for sex trafficking, the parliament passed a law in April 2009 criminalizing the purchase of sexual services and another in March 2010 prohibiting nude shows in Iceland. Iceland's national anti-trafficking action plan adopted in March 2009 outlined next steps to improve prevention measures and formal provisions for victim assistance.

In 2012 the U.S. State Department's Office to Monitor and Combat Trafficking in Persons placed Iceland at Tier 1; the country stayed there until 2017 when it was placed at Tier 2. By 2023, the country had returned to Tier 1. In 2023, the Organised Crime Index noted the increased involvement of European criminal gangs in this crime; it also noted changes in legislation to identify and protect victims.

== Law enforcement and public order ==
The police accept crime reports online and through the national emergency number 112. The National Commissioner releases topic dashboards and yearly national tables to inform prevention and community policing initiatives.

== Prisons and incarceration ==
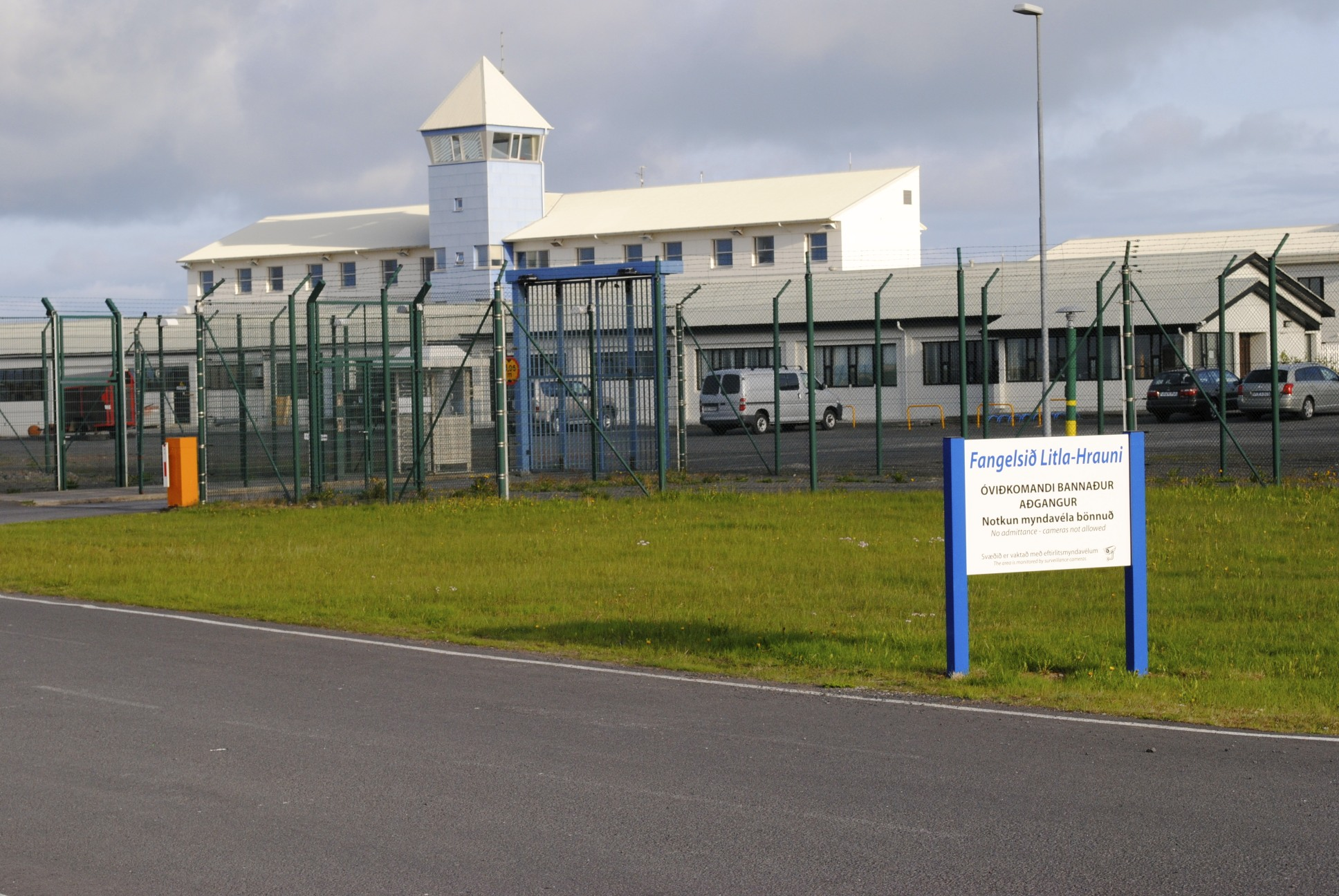
Men's Prison Litla Hraun in Eyrarbakki.

The Prison and Probation Administration (Fangelsismálastofnun) runs Iceland's prisons and publishes annual reports. The reception and remand facility at Hólmsheiði has 52 sentenced places and dedicated remand/isolation cells; Litla-Hraun is the main closed prison, with eight units and capacity for up to 83 male inmates. Recent policy announcements envisage a new high-security prison project at Stóra-Hraun to modernise the estate.

== Victim services ==
Iceland maintains specialised, multi-agency centres for victims of violence. Bjarkarhlíð in Reykjavík offers counselling and coordinated services; national portal 112.is lists Bjarkarhlíð and NGO Stígamót (sexual-violence services) among available resources. A 2023 government review summarised the three Icelandic victim-support centres (Bjarkarhlíð, Bjarmahlíð in Akureyri and Sigurhæðir at Selfoss).

== International safety rankings ==
Multiple comparative indices consistently rank Iceland among the safest and most peaceful countries in the world. The Global Peace Index 2025 lists Iceland as the most peaceful country, a position it has held since 2008; the report notes that Iceland ranks first in the Safety and Security domain and describes it as the world's safest country in 2025. Other composite rankings similarly place Iceland at or near the top for overall safety; for example, Global Finance ranked Iceland first in its Top 100 Safest Countries list.

=== Homicide and violent crime ===
International series indicate that Iceland's intentional homicide rate is among the lowest worldwide and has remained well below 1 per 100,000 inhabitants in recent years, according to the UNODC/World Bank indicator VC.IHR.PSRC.P5. Published compilations of that series report a rate of 0.54 per 100,000 for 2021.

=== Travel-advisory characterisations ===
Official travel advisories describe Iceland as a low-crime environment. The United Kingdom's foreign travel advice states that “Crime levels are low” (with routine cautions regarding petty theft in nightlife areas). The United States classifies Iceland at Level 1 – Exercise normal precautions.

=== Policing and (de)militarisation context ===
In general, Icelandic police do not routinely carry firearms; authorisations and the use of force are tightly regulated. Iceland also has no standing armed forces, which is frequently noted in discussions of its low level of militarisation; defence and security roles are fulfilled through the Coast Guard and cooperation within NATO.

== See also ==
- Law enforcement in Iceland
- Human trafficking in Iceland
- Prison and Probation Administration (Iceland)
