= ICRU =

The initials ICRU can stand for

- Iceland Crisis Response Unit
- International Commission on Radiation Units and Measurements
