= NATO Agreement on Safeguarding Defence-Related Inventions =

1960 NATO treaty

Agreement for the mutual safeguarding of secrecy of inventions relating to defence and for which applications for patents have been made
- Signed: September 21, 1960
- Location: Paris, France
- Effective: January 12, 1961
- Signatories: 12
- Parties: 27
- Depositary: United States
- Languages: French, English

The NATO Agreement for the mutual safeguarding of secrecy of inventions relating to defence and for which applications for patents have been made was signed in Paris on September 21, 1960. It entered into force on January 12, 1961, following deposit of the instruments of ratification by the first two countries, namely the United States and Norway.

== Countries ==
Iceland, a founder of NATO with no standing army, did not participate in the convention. The following countries are parties the agreement:

Country	Ratified or Approved or Acceded
Albania	2010/10/23
Belgium	1961/11/19
Bulgaria	2004/10/22
Canada	1972/09/01
Croatia	2010/05/05
Czech Republic	2000/10/11
Denmark	1961/12/15
Estonia	2009/10/20
France	1965/02/17
Germany	1964/01/06
Greece	1963/08/15
Italy	1974/07/25
Latvia	2005/02/17
Lithuania	2004/09/22
Luxembourg	1967/03/03
Netherlands	1971/10/08
Norway	1961/01/12
Poland	1999/09/21
Portugal	1965/06/10
Romania	2005/08/04
Slovakia	2004/09/13
Slovenia	2004/09/28
Spain	1987/08/10
Turkey	1962/03/22
United Kingdom	1961/11/12
United States	1961/01/12
