= List of prisons in Iceland =

Prisons in Iceland are few and generally low security.

== Current ==
Name	Municipality	Established	Capacity	Security level	Notes
Fangelsið Akureyri	Akureyrarkaupstaður	1978	10	Low	Used for prisoners with a remaining sentence of 1 year or less. Prisoners are expected to either work or receive education and to take care of themselves for the most part.
Fangelsið Hólmsheiði	Reykjavíkurborg	10 June 2016	56	Medium	Used for reception and remand in addition to being a women's prison.
Fangelsið Kvíabryggju	Grundarfjörður	1954	22	Open	Used for prisoners with a remaining sentence of 2 year or less. Prisoners are expected to either work or receive education and to take care of themselves for the most part.
Fangelsið Sogni	Árborg	1 June 2012	20	Open	Prisoners are expected to either work or receive education and to take care of themselves for the most part.
Litla-Hraun	Árborg	8 March 1929	45	High	Used for prisoners with long sentences, particularly those with a history of violence.
			153		

== Former ==
Name	Municipality	Established	Closed	Capacity	Security level	Notes
Fangelsið Bitru	Árborg	14 May 2010	18 April 2012	16	Open	Prisoners were expected to either work or receive education and to take care of themselves for the most part.
Fangelsið Kópavogsbraut 17	Kópavogsbær	1989	22 May 2015	12	Medium	All female prisoners served their sentences in Kópavogsbær, short sentences could be served elsewhere. Due to the low female prison population, male prisoners with short sentences and no history of violence were also accepted.
Hegningarhúsið	Reykjavíkurborg	1874	1 June 2016	16	Medium	Used for short detention, short sentences and for new prisoners awaiting transfer.
