= Prison and Probation Administration (Iceland) =

Prison and Probation Administration Fangelsismálastofnun ríkisins
- Official insignia

Jurisdictional structure
- National agency: Iceland
- Operations jurisdiction: Iceland
- Governing body: Icelandic Government

Operational structure
- Elected officer responsible: Jón Gunnarsson, Minister for Justice
- Agency executive: Páll Egill Winkel, Director General

Website
- www.fangelsi.is

The Prison and Probation Administration (Icelandic: Fangelsismálastofnun ríkisins) is the national correctional agency of Iceland. Along with the Icelandic National Police, Directorate of Customs, and the Icelandic Coast Guard, the Icelandic Prison Service is one of the few law enforcement agencies in Iceland. The current Director General of the Prison and Probation Administration is Páll Egill Winkel.

== Mission and role ==
The mission and role of the Prison and Probation Administration is:

- To supervise the execution of sentences and other functions in accordance with the provisions of the Execution of Sentences Act No. 15/2016 and regulations issued thereunder.
- Responsible for the management of prisons.
- To supervise those who are serving their sentence through community services and are subject to electronic surveillance. The PPA may, according to an agreement, refer those tasks to others.
- To supervise persons whose prosecution proceedings have been deferred with supervision and those who have been given suspended sentences with supervision or who have been pardoned with supervision. The PPA can entrust it to another party.
- To supervise and be responsible for health services and other services that prisoners are entitled to have according to other laws and regulations.

== History ==
The current Prison and Probation Administration was formed in 1989 at the merger of other agencies after an assessment of the state of prisons and rehabilitation in Iceland.

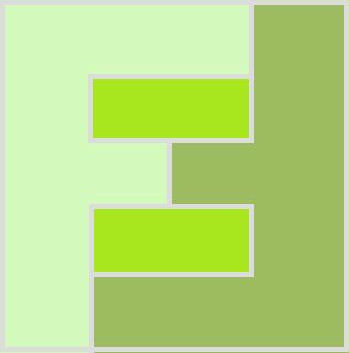
Former logo of the PPA before adopting the use of the coat of arms for Iceland.

== Power and authority of prison staff ==
Prison staff may use force in carrying out their duties if this is considered necessary in order to:

- Prevent an escape.
- Defend themselves against an imminent attack, overpower violent resistance, prevent a prisoner from harming himself or others and to prevent acts of vandalism.
- To follow orders that need to be carried out immediately and a prisoner refuses or neglects to comply with instructions regarding them.
- Force may involve physical holding or the use of the appropriate defensive equipment.

== Prisons in Iceland ==
The PPA currently operates five prisons. The PPA has the ability to house 153 inmates, the largest being the prison at Hólmsheiði which has the ability to house 53 prisoners. The prison at Hólmsheiði, which was opened in 2016 is the first purpose built prison in Iceland since 1874.

Aside from Fangelsið Akureyri, which is in the northern city of Akureyri, prisons in Iceland are all located in the southwest end of the country. This includes the oldest prison, Hegningarhúsið, which is located in downtown Reykjavík. This roughly corresponds with the country's population centres.

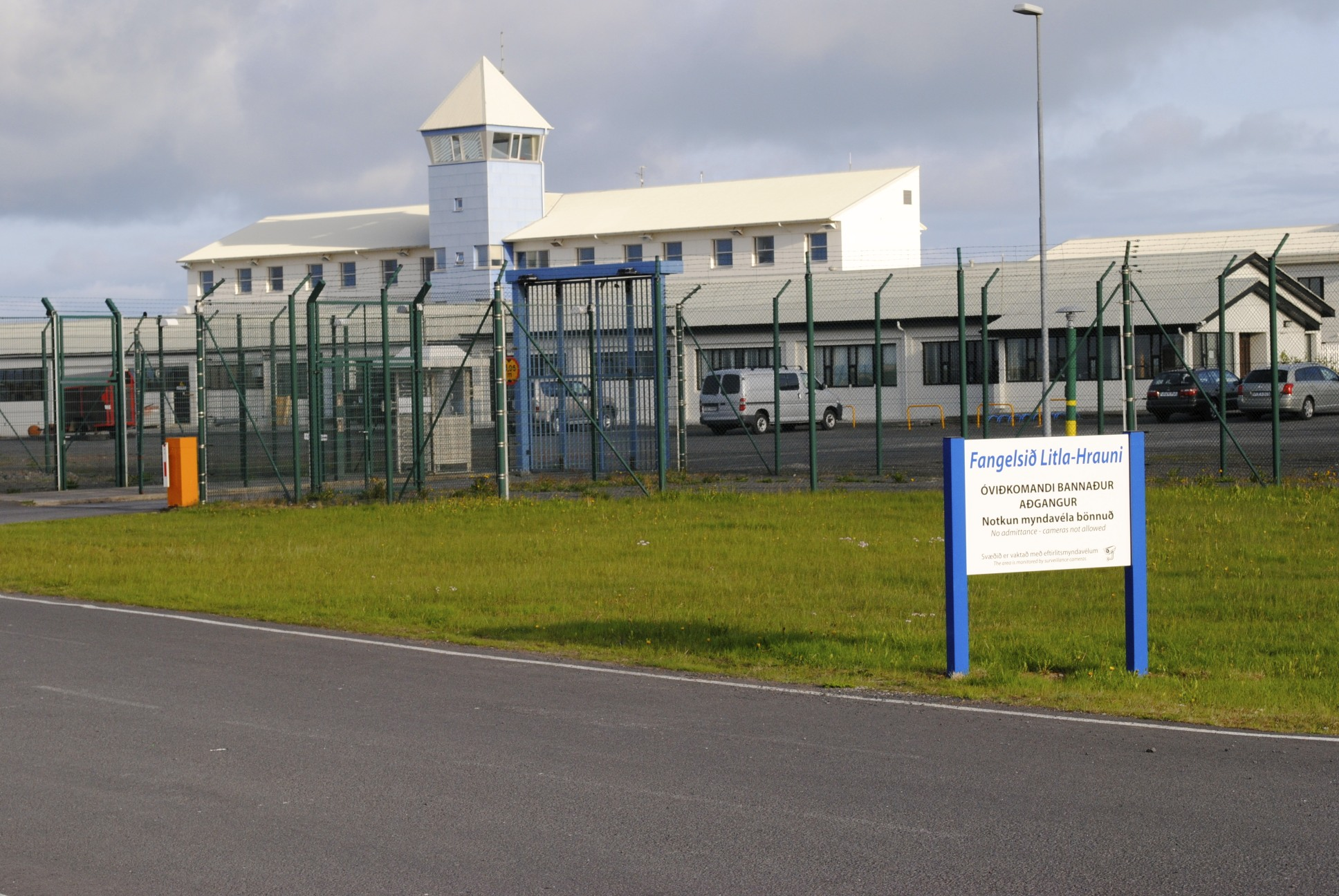
Men's Prison Litla Hraun in Eyrarbakki.

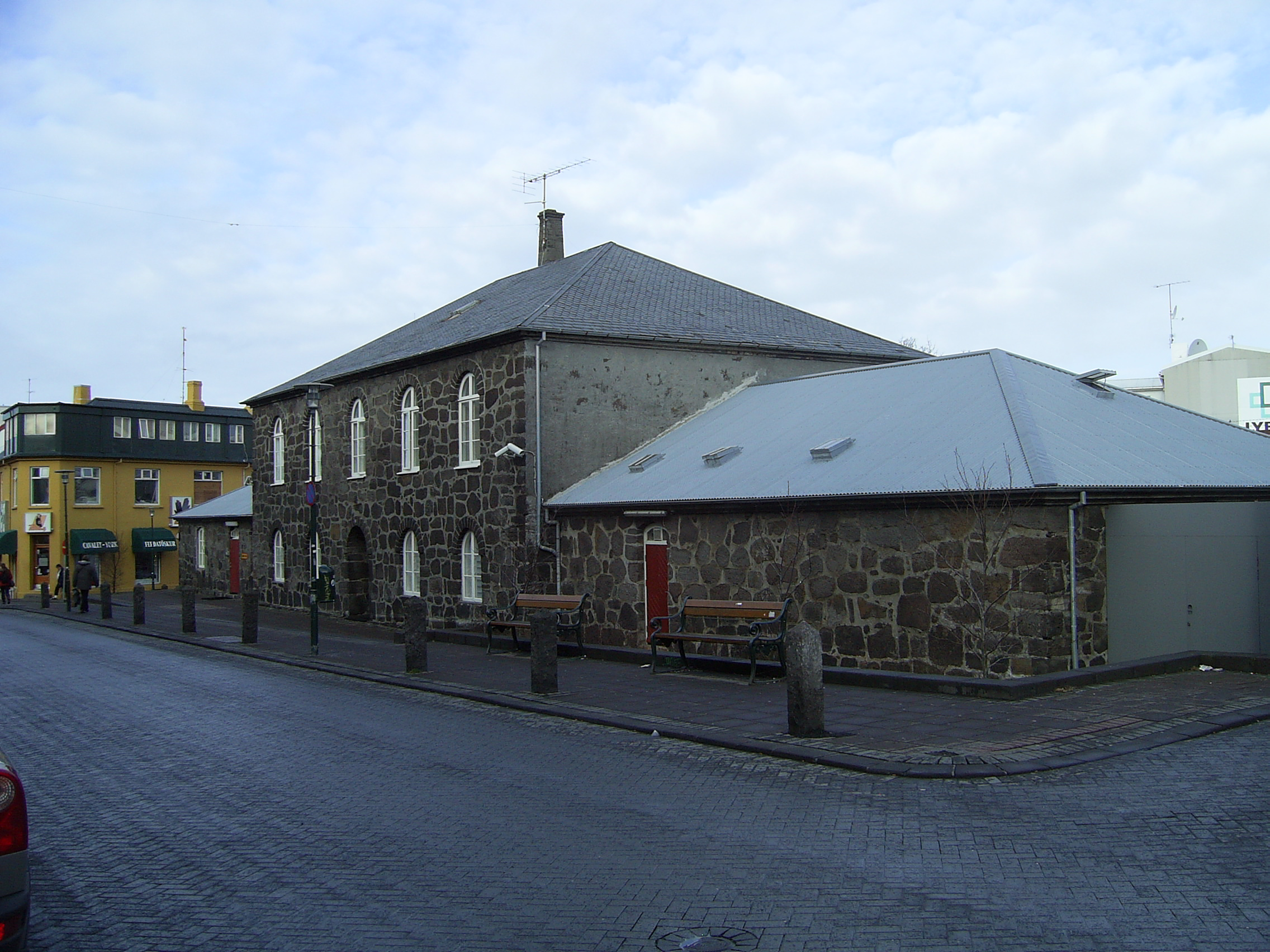
Former prison, Hegningarhúsið, removed from use in 2015.

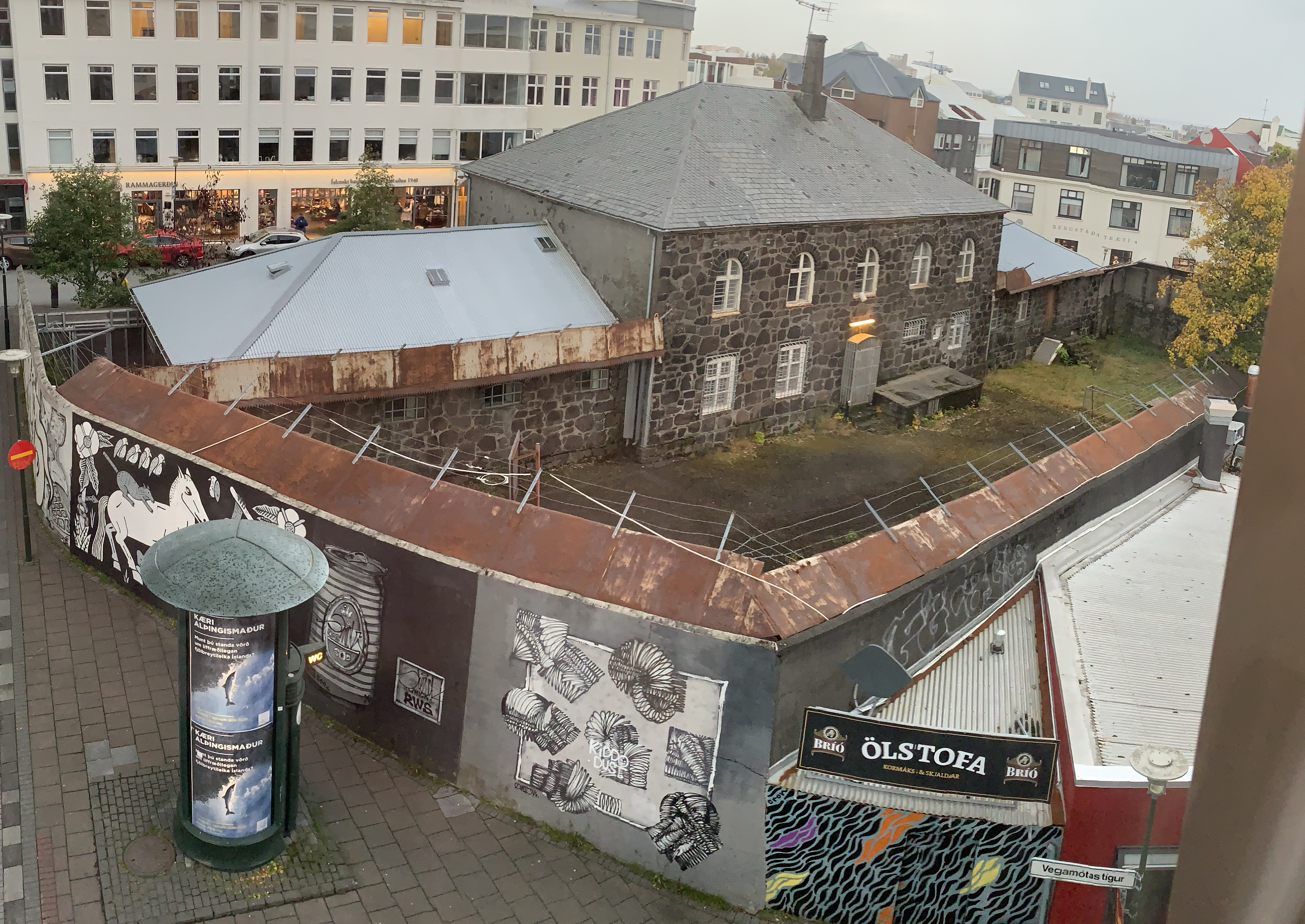
Hegningarhúsið Exercise Yard

== Ranks ==
#	Title	English translation
1	Forstjóri	Director General
2	Forstöðumaður	Director
3	Deildarstjóri	Division Chief
4	Varðstjóri	Inspector
5	Aðstoðarvarðstjóri	Deputy Inspector
6	Fangavörður í sérhæfðu starfi	Specialized Prison Officer
7	Fangavörður að loknum skóla	Prison Officer after School
8	Fangavörður án skóla	Prison Officer without School
8	Fangavarðanemi	Prison Officer Academy Student

== Uniforms ==
The present uniform of the PPA is a black shirt or a polo shirt with black trousers. Also available are various jackets. Uniform is to be worn with epaulettes.

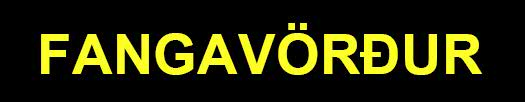
Prison guard chest patch

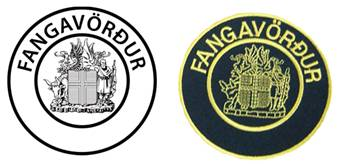
Prison guard shoulder patch

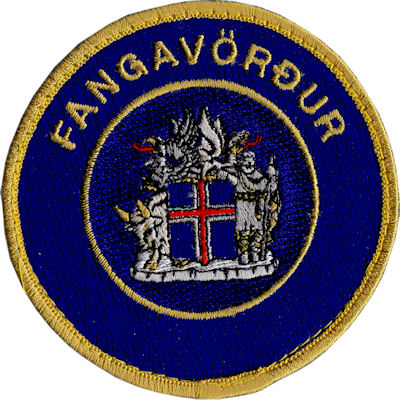
Former Prison Service Shoulder Patch

The image displays the former shoulder patch of the Icelandic Prison Service. The present shoulder patch is black with gold lettering and outlining.

== See also ==
- Military of Iceland
- Icelandic Police
- Directorate of Customs
