= Iceland Crisis Response Unit =

- Íslenska friðargæslan
- Active: 1990s – present
- Country: Iceland
- Role: Peacekeeping
- Size: 200 roster (2007); 30 deployed (2007)
- Engagements: Operation Enduring Freedom; ISAF; KFOR

Commanders
- Prime Minister: Kristrún Frostadóttir
- Minister for Foreign Affairs: Þorgerður Katrín Gunnarsdóttir
- Notable commanders: Colonel Arnór Sigurjónsson; Colonel Halli Sigurðsson; Col. Gunnar Friðriksson

The Iceland Crisis Response Unit (ICRU; Icelandic: Íslenska friðargæslan) is an Icelandic paramilitary unit with a capacity roster of up to 200 people, of whom about 30 are active at any given time. It is operated by the Icelandic Ministry of Foreign Affairs.

It is primarily designated for peacekeeping operations and was established in the 1990s to participate in operations and peacekeeping projects, including in support of NATO peacekeeping operations. That role later evolved into providing an appropriate forum for deploying personnel within other organizations such as with OSCE field missions as well as with UN DPKO, and organizations such as UNIFEM, UNRWA and UNICEF.

== History ==
Iceland deployed its first peacekeepers in 1950, when two Icelandic police officers were sent to Palestine as a part of an UN peacekeeping operation.

Though many Icelandic specialists have taken part in various peacekeeping operations since, mostly within the UN and its organizations but also within NATO, it was not until the 1990s that organized participation in peacekeeping operations was initiated. This was formalized with the establishment of the ICRU in 2001.

In 2008, a portion of uniformed ICRU deployed personnel still armed for self-defense returned their weapons and changed to civilian clothing. The policy since 2008, is that, unless under special circumstances, ICRU personnel do not wear uniforms or carry weapons.

The Ministry for Foreign Affairs in Iceland oversees the roster and deployment of personnel.

=== Missions ===
The ICRU personnel has been deployed to the former territories of Yugoslavia, Kosovo and Afghanistan through NATO missions and UNIFEM and to the Middle East and North Africa with UNICEF, UNRWA and UNHCR.

The ICRU had a civilian observer mission in Sri Lanka in co-operation with Norway (previously a Nordic mission) and has explosive ordnance disposal personnel from the Icelandic Coast Guard to Lebanon and Iraq.

== Personnel ==
The deployed personnel of the ICRU were experts, including Icelandic policemen, Coast Guardsmen and others that had relative training for the concerned institutions.

In addition to those mentioned above, these backgrounds range from logistical backgrounds, medical or engineering backgrounds, social sciences and so on. But now, after a law was passed in 2007 the "peacekeepers" need a college degree. In 2014, it is much more of an aid squad rather than peacekeepers.

The previously deployed doctors, nurses, those deployed as Provincial Reconstruction Teams (PRT) as well as those working at Kabul International Airport (KAIA) were trained by the Norwegian Armed Forces (previously the United Kingdom Armed Forces as well) as they were expected to merge into a military environment and the PRT's as well as those working at Kabul airport would be armed.

The ICRU roster members receive training and exercise in line with their deployment, but no military training from 2009. The legal basis for the ICRU is set in Icelandic law on ICRU, No. 73/2007

== Operations ==
The ICRU classifies its operations in the following manner:

- Peacekeeping and Crisis management
- Observer missions
- Reconstruction
- Humanitarian and Emergency assistance

=== Intelligence gathering ===
The National Commissioner of Iceland is charged with intelligence gathering for national security purposes as well as expeditionary peacekeeping operations. The Defence Department of the Ministry for Foreign Affairs oversees military related intelligence and cooperation in that field.

== Equipment ==
=== Vehicles ===
Model	Origin	Notes
Nissan Patrol	Japan Iceland	24 modified by Arctic Trucks for PRT teams previously deployed in Afghanistan
Santana Anibal	Spain	
Iveco Trakker	Italy	

=== Small arms ===
PRT teams previously deployed in Afghanistan as well as those previously working in Kabul International Airport were supplied with the weaponry and ammunition the military forces they are cooperating with use. The standard weaponry was in most cases however of Norwegian origin.

Model	Origin	Type
Glock 17	Austria	Semi-automatic pistol
Heckler & Koch MP5	West Germany	Submachine gun
Diemaco C8	Canada	Assault rifle
AG-3	Norway	Battle rifle
FN Minimi	Belgium	Light machine gun
Rheinmetall MG3	Germany	General-purpose machine gun

== Ranks of the Icelandic Crisis Response Unit ==
=== Officers ===
NATO code	OF-10	OF-9	OF-8	OF-7	OF-6	OF-5	OF-4	OF-3	OF-2	OF-1
Iceland Crisis Response Unit
Iceland Crisis Response Unit						Ofursti	Undirofursti	Majór	Höfuðsmaður	Liðsforingi	Undirliðsforingi

=== Enlisted ===
NATO code	OR-9	OR-8	OR-7	OR-6	OR-5	OR-4	OR-3	OR-2	OR-1
Iceland Crisis Response Unit
Iceland Crisis Response Unit				Flokkstjóri 1.	Flokkstjóri 2.	Korporáll			Óbreyttur

== See also ==
- Defence of Iceland
- Icelandic Coast Guard
- Iceland Air Defence System
