= List of wars involving Iceland =

The following is a list of wars involving Iceland. Although modern Iceland does not maintain a standing army, navy nor air force, it maintains a militarised coast guard which is in charge of defending the country. The country has deployed a small peacekeeping force internationally on a few occasions. It has never participated in a full-scale war or invasion, and the constitution of Iceland has no mechanism to declare war.

None of the Cod Wars meet any of the common thresholds for a conventional war, and they may more accurately be described as militarised interstate disputes between Iceland and the United Kingdom.

== Before 1500 ==
Conflict	Combatant 1	Combatant 2	Result
Internal conflict: Age of the Sturlungs (1220–1264)	Icelandic Gothis; Supported by: (Kingdom of Norway (872–1397)) Kingdom of Norway	Commonwealth Gothis	Old Covenant: Termination of the Icelandic Commonwealth; Iceland is integrated into the Kingdom of Norway; 74 Icelanders dead

== 1500–2000 ==
Date	Conflict / Event	Allies	Enemies	Result
1538–1550	Icelandic Reformation	Catholics	Denmark-Norway; Protestants	Icelandic/Catholic victory: Continuation of the Protestant church in Iceland; 127 dead
1627	Turkish Abductions	(Denmark–Norway) Denmark-Norway: Iceland	Ottoman Empire: Algeria	Abduction of 400–800 Icelanders: 53 dead
1797	Action of 16 May 1797	(Denmark–Norway) Denmark-Norway: Iceland	Ottoman Empire: Tripolitania	Victory
1803–1815	Iceland in the Napoleonic Wars	France (Denmark–Norway) Denmark-Norway: Iceland	United Kingdom privateers	Dano-French defeat: Dissolution of Denmark-Norway; Iceland remains within Denmark as a dependency
1809	Jørgen Jørgensen's Revolution	Jørgen Jørgensen: Icelandic revolutionaries	(Denmark–Norway) Denmark-Norway: Icelandic loyalists; (United Kingdom of Great Britain and Ireland) United Kingdom	Danish government restored: Jørgen Jørgensen arrested by the British navy
1940	Invasion of Iceland		United Kingdom	British victory: Occupation of Iceland
1958–1976	The Cod Wars	Iceland	United Kingdom; West Germany; Belgium	Victory: Iceland secures its territorial water claims

== After 2000 ==
=== Peacekeeping ===
Mission	Date	Location	Troops deployed
MNF-I	2004–2007	Iraq	10
ISAF	2002–2014	Afghanistan	2–32

== See also ==
- Defence of Iceland
- Iceland in World War II (invasion)
- List of countries without armed forces
- Military history of Iceland
- Turkish Abductions
