= Viking Squad =

Counter-terrorism military unit

Special Unit of the National Police Commissioner
- Sérsveit ríkislögreglustjóra (Icelandic)
- Active: 19 October 1982 – present
- Country: Iceland
- Agency: Icelandic Police
- Type: Police tactical unit
- Role: Counter-terrorism; Law enforcement
- Motto: "Með lögum skal land byggja" "The land shall be built by laws"
- Common name: Viking Squad; Víkingasveitin (Icelandic)

Structure
- Operators: 46

Notables
- Significant operation(s): Yugoslav wars; Operation Enduring Freedom; Hraunbær shooting

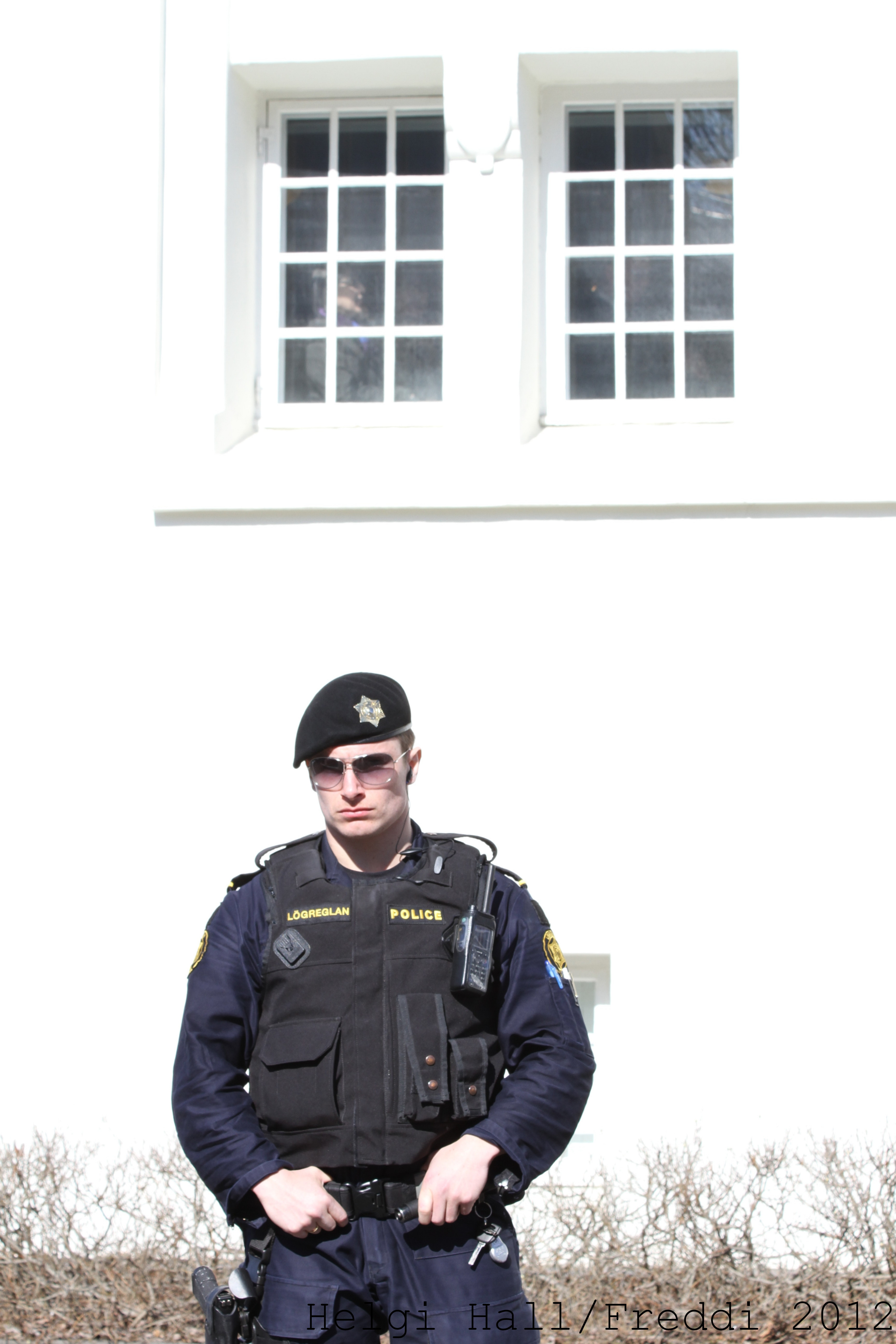
An armed officer from the Viking Squad in 2012

The Special Unit of the National Police Commissioner (Icelandic: Sérsveit ríkislögreglustjóra), more commonly referred to as the Viking Squad (Icelandic: Víkingasveitin), is the police tactical unit of the Icelandic Police.

The unit is in many ways modeled on the Delta tactical unit of the Norwegian Police Service with which it conducts many exercises, both in Norway and Iceland. As of 2021, the unit has 46 police officers.

The National Police Commissioner published that the squad would be fully staffed at 55 police officers by 2010. In 2018, it was staffed with 46 officers. Iceland has no standard military, and thus some functions usually performed by military forces in other nations are performed in Iceland by units such as the Viking Squad.

== Duties ==
The unit is tasked with several duties, including but not limited to:

- Security of the state and state officials
- Security of foreign dignitaries
- Assisting in making high-risk arrests
- Hostage rescue
- Bomb disposal
- Anti-piracy operations
- Counter-terrorism
- Support of local police forces

Additionally, the unit is designated to protect important installations in wartime, and it is often involved in exercises with Norwegian and Danish military special forces. During the stay of the U.S. military forces in Iceland, it conducted anti–special forces training operations and was responsible for its defences against terrorism.

== Squads ==
Upon joining the unit an officer must specialize in something and then be placed in a specialized unit. The unit names are from the NATO-Phonetic alphabet. Such as Alpha, Bravo etc. The specialized units are:

- Rappelling and rescue unit
- Breaching technology unit
- Marksman unit
- Diving and boat unit
- Explosive ordnance disposal unit (EOD)

The unit also has specially trained medics from the Reykjavík fire brigade but they are not armed.

== History ==
=== Armed police ===
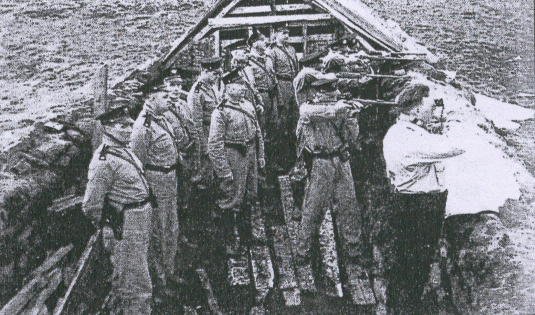
Officers practicing rifle shooting in 1940

Although the first Icelandic law enforcement officers, the nightwatchmen of Reykjavík in the eighteenth-century, were heavily armed with morning stars, the armed capabilities of early twentieth-century police were very limited. However the threat of a communist revolution and later invasion by foreign militaries forced the Icelandic government to rethink its position on police weaponry.

As a response to the forming of an illegal communist paramilitary unit the Icelandic police acquired Krag–Jørgensen rifles, Royal MM34 and Royal 7.65 mm pistols, and in late 1939 officers of the Capital Police were to form the officer corps of an Icelandic military defence force. This re-arming was spearheaded by Prime Minister and former police chief Hermann Jónasson and Agnar Kofoed Hansen Chief of Capital Police and officer graduate from the Danish Army. This military force never went from the training grounds as it was still training on 10 May 1940, the day 740 Royal Marines invaded Iceland.

During the war, Agnar did his best to continue acquiring weapons despite the unwillingness of British occupational forces to permit such imports. Nonetheless Reising .45 calibre sub-machine guns and Federal Laboratories grenade launchers were bought from the US along with tear gas.

The forming of a military defence force from the militarily-trained portion of the Icelandic police did not continue after the war, as it was eventually decided that the US Armed Forces would continue to defend Iceland from military threats while Icelandic police concentrated on internal threats from communist revolutionary forces.

=== Special unit ===
The special unit is considered to have been officially founded on 19 October 1982, when its first members finished training with Norwegian special forces. There were many reasons for commissioning the unit, including a hijacked airliner that landed at Keflavík International Airport in 1976 and a few occasions of criminals using firearms against unarmed policemen. It had become clear that the Icelandic Police needed an effective tool to combat such violent, armed situations.

Members of the unit were deployed in the Balkans as a part of operations led by NATO, and some members have been deployed to Afghanistan. The unit used to be under the command of the Reykjavík Chief of Police. However, in 1997, a new law was passed that put the unit directly under the National Commissioner of the Icelandic Police.

In December 2003, Minister of Justice, Björn Bjarnason, introduced plans to strengthen the unit in response to the war on terrorism, and further its responsibility in all operational issues covering more than one local jurisdictions. Today, members of the unit are stationed in three different police districts, Höfuðborgarsvæðið police district (metropolitan police), Suðurnes police district and Akureyri police district.

On 2 December 2013, a man died after a gun battle with the members of the special unit. The unit had never been forced to open fire at suspects before. This was the first and only time a person was killed by police in Icelandic history.

== See also ==
- Icelandic National Police
- Military of Iceland
