= Kvíabryggja Prison =

Icelandic prison established in 1954

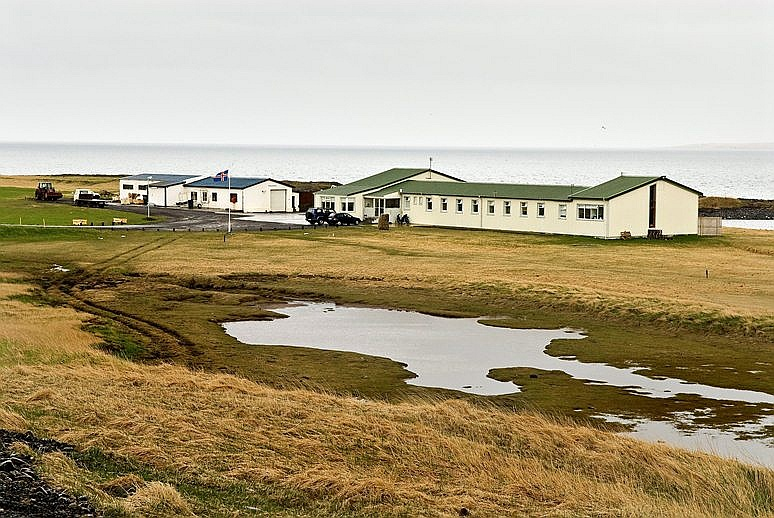
Kvíabryggja prison

Kvíabryggja Prison (Icelandic: Fangelsið Kvíabryggju [ˈfauɲcɛlsɪð ˈkʰviːaˌprɪcːʏ]) is a prison in Iceland, located in Snæfellsnes.

Kvíabryggja is an open prison and is not fenced off. It is used for prisoners who have less than 2 years remaining of their sentence, who are capable of serving a sentence with minimal supervision, and who do not have an addiction. Prisoners are expected to either work or receive education.

The prison was established in 1954 and has a capacity for 23 prisoners.

== See also ==
- List of prisons in Iceland
