= Agreed Minute =

The Agreed Minute was a statute governing the nature of the U.S. military presence in Iceland from 1994 to 2006.

== History ==
In 1951 American troops returned to Iceland to form an Iceland Defense Force. As Iceland has had no standing military of its own since World War II, it was perceived that standing defences were required as the Soviet threat heightened. After the Cold War ended, the U.S. was reluctant to maintain the expense of retaining forces in Iceland. Icelandic politicians, however, were reluctant to see the American forces leave. Hence the Agreed Minute was developed and signed in 1994 as a compromise in which both parties compromised and came to an understanding.

The Agreed Minute was last renegotiated in 2001. At the time, the U.S. Air Force committed itself to maintaining four to six interceptors at the Keflavík base, supported by a helicopter rescue squadron. The Air Force, in order to cut costs, announced plans to remove the four remaining jets in 2003. The removal was then delayed to address Icelandic demands for continued presence of the jets. After an unfruitful series of negotiations and two reshufflings of the Icelandic government the issue lay dormant until early 2006 when the U.S. Air Force issued an official statement that withdrawal of the aircraft was already being prepared. U.S. officials have since then argued that Iceland is in no need of U.S. military presence and the last remaining airmen left Iceland during September 2006.
