= Leiðarhólmsskrá =

Leiðarhólmsskrá (Icelandic pronunciation: [ˈleiːðarˌhoulmsˌskrauː], lit. 'Leiðarhólm Agreement') was an agreement and an open letter to the King, named officials and the whole public, signed by 26 Icelandic chieftains in 1513, protesting ecclesiastical encroachment. Primarily the violation of the Sættargjörðin í Túnsbergi, a treaty from 1277, reinstated in 1458, where power was divided between Church and King.

== Background ==
In the 15th and 16th century the Icelandic Church had become the most powerful entity in the country, both economically and in military matters and had separate laws. Both Bishops and Clerics used had used this to further their powers even more by taking lands from their legal owners without the chieftains being capable of challenging this. The Church also dispensed Canonical law excessively, punishing harshly those who offended them while protecting murderers of non-clerics and other criminals.

== Sources ==
- Vilborg Auður Ísleifsdóttir, Siðbreytingin á Íslandi 1537-1565, Hið íslenzka bókmenntafélag. Reykjavík. 1997. p. 109-114. ISBN 9979-804-98-X
