= Directorate of Customs =

National customs service of Iceland

Directorate of Customs Tollstjóri
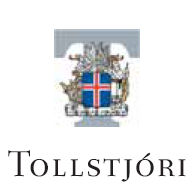
- Insignia of the Directorate of Customs

- Flag of the Directorate of Customs

Agency overview
- Formed: 1929
- Employees: 250
- Legal personality: Governmental: Government agency

Jurisdictional structure
- National agency: Iceland
- Operations jurisdiction: Iceland
- Constituting instrument: Customs Law (Law No. 88/2005)
- Specialist jurisdiction: Customs, excise, gambling

Operational structure
- Overseen by ministry: Ministry of Finance
- Headquarters: Tryggvagötu 19, 101 Reykjavík, Iceland
- Elected officer responsible: Bjarni Benediktsson, Minister of Finance
- Agency executive: Sigurður Skúli Bergsson, Director-general

Website
- customs.is (in English) tollur.is (in Icelandic)

The Directorate of Customs (Icelandic: Tollstjóri) is the national customs service of Iceland. The Directorate of Customs is the law enforcement agency, which is in charge of not only the collection of customs duties, but also the detection of smuggling and confiscation of counterfeit items entering Iceland.

== Organisation ==
The Directorate of Customs was established in 1929, after the Act of Union allowed Iceland to create foreign policy apart from that of the Kingdom of Denmark. The Directorate of Customs falls under the Ministry of Finance and Economic Affairs, as its primary duty is to control import duties, taxes, tariffs, and other state revenues.

The Directorate of Customs is not divided into separate regions or districts and has its headquarters at Tryggvagata 19, 101 Reykjavík. There are approximately 250 employees in the Directorate of Customs, who are spread out in various departments and duty-stations throughout Iceland.

== Collections duties ==
Aside from standard customs actions, which involve the collection of duties and tariffs on items imported into Iceland, as the sole enforcement agency for the Ministry of Finance and Economic Affairs and Directorate of Internal Revenue, the Directorate of Customs is also charged with the collection of various state taxes.

The taxes which Directorate of Customs collects include:

- National and municipal income tax
- Automobile tax
- Road tax
- Value added tax
- Wealth tax

Property tax is handled by the municipalities and is thus not a customs matter.

== Powers ==
The Directorate of Customs has various powers, empowered by the Customs law.

- Free and unhindered access - the Customs may patrol anywhere on and along the coast of the country, in harbour areas and airports.
- Customs officers may use force, including handcuffs and pepper spray, in the execution of their duties.
- Customs officers may arrest a person caught, or suspected of violating laws enforced by customs officers.
- Customs officers may search anywhere in any vessel within the Icelandic customs territory.
- Customs officers may inspect and investigate all goods transported to the country.
- Customs officers may pursue persons who evade or try to evade.
- Customs officers may search buildings after a pursuit, in which a waiting for a court ruling might cause evidence being destroyed.
- Customs officers may search persons who are in means of transport, in buildings or in areas or on their way from means of transport, buildings or places where customs officers are authorized to investigate and inspect goods.
- Customs officers shall seize items considered to have value as evidence in a criminal case, if they have been obtained by criminal means or if it may be assumed that they might become subject to confiscation due to violations of the Customs Law or other laws.
- If an importer, exporter, customs broker, traveller or crew member brings financial assets into the country from abroad or from the country to a foreign country the executors of customs enforcement authority have the discretion to confiscate the assets when there is suspicion of said assets being used to commit a violation against the penalty clauses of the General Penal Code.
- The Customs may circumscribe a vessel which has arrived in port or at an airport, and also prohibit traffic in areas where loading or unloading of goods takes place, or through which passengers pass on their way to or from a vessel in international journeys. Furthermore the Customs can restrict boarding or disembarking to specific places or times. In consultation with port authorities, the Customs can also specify a location for a vessel to load or unload.
- If necessary the Customs may summon for assistance every adult person. A person must comply with the summons of the Customs if he can render assistance without putting his life, health, well being or substantial personal interests or those of near relatives in danger. Those summoned to assist the Customs are empowered with customs enforcement authority while carrying out their duties and enjoy the same protection as customs officers.
- No one may in any way obstruct a person in the performance of customs duties or disobey instructions given by customs officers for the purpose of applying the relevant laws.

== Ranks ==
Order	Title	Picture	English translation
1.	Tollstjóri		Chief of Customs
2.	Aðstoðartollstjóri		Assistant Chief of Customs
3.	Forstöðumaður Tollasviðs		Customs Manager
4.	Yfirtollvörður		Head Customs Officer
5.	Aðstoðaryfirtollvörður		Assistant Head Customs Officer
6.	Aðalvarðstjóri; Tollfulltrúi		Chief Inspector; Chief Customs Specialist
7.	Varðstjóri; Tollsérfræðingur		Inspector; Customs Specialist
8.	Tollvörður að loknum skóla		Customs Officer after school
9.	Tollvörður fyrir skóla		Customs Officer before school

== Insignia ==
Flag

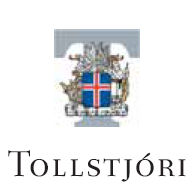
Logo
