= Hegningarhúsið =

Prison in Reykjavik, Iceland

Coordinates: 64.1455°N 21.9315°W

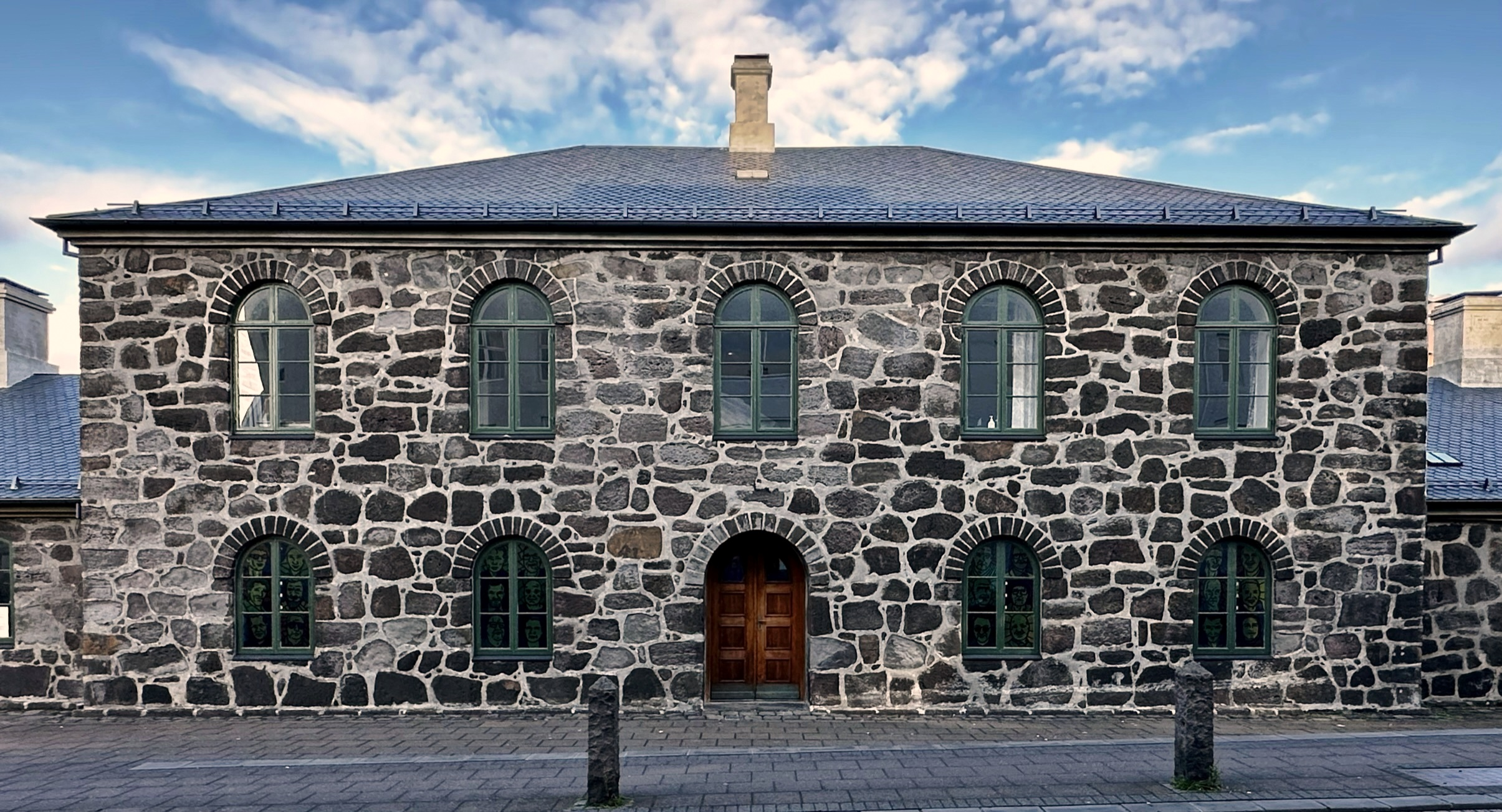
Hegningarhúsið at Skólavörðustígur in Reykjavík

Hegningarhúsið (Icelandic pronunciation: [ˈhɛkniŋkarˌhuːsɪθ], "The Penalty House") at Skólavörðustígur 9 in Reykjavík was a prison run by the Icelandic Prison Service. Built in 1872 by the designs of G. Ch. W. Klentz, it was the oldest prison in Iceland. All operations in Hegningarhúsið ceased on 1 June 2016.

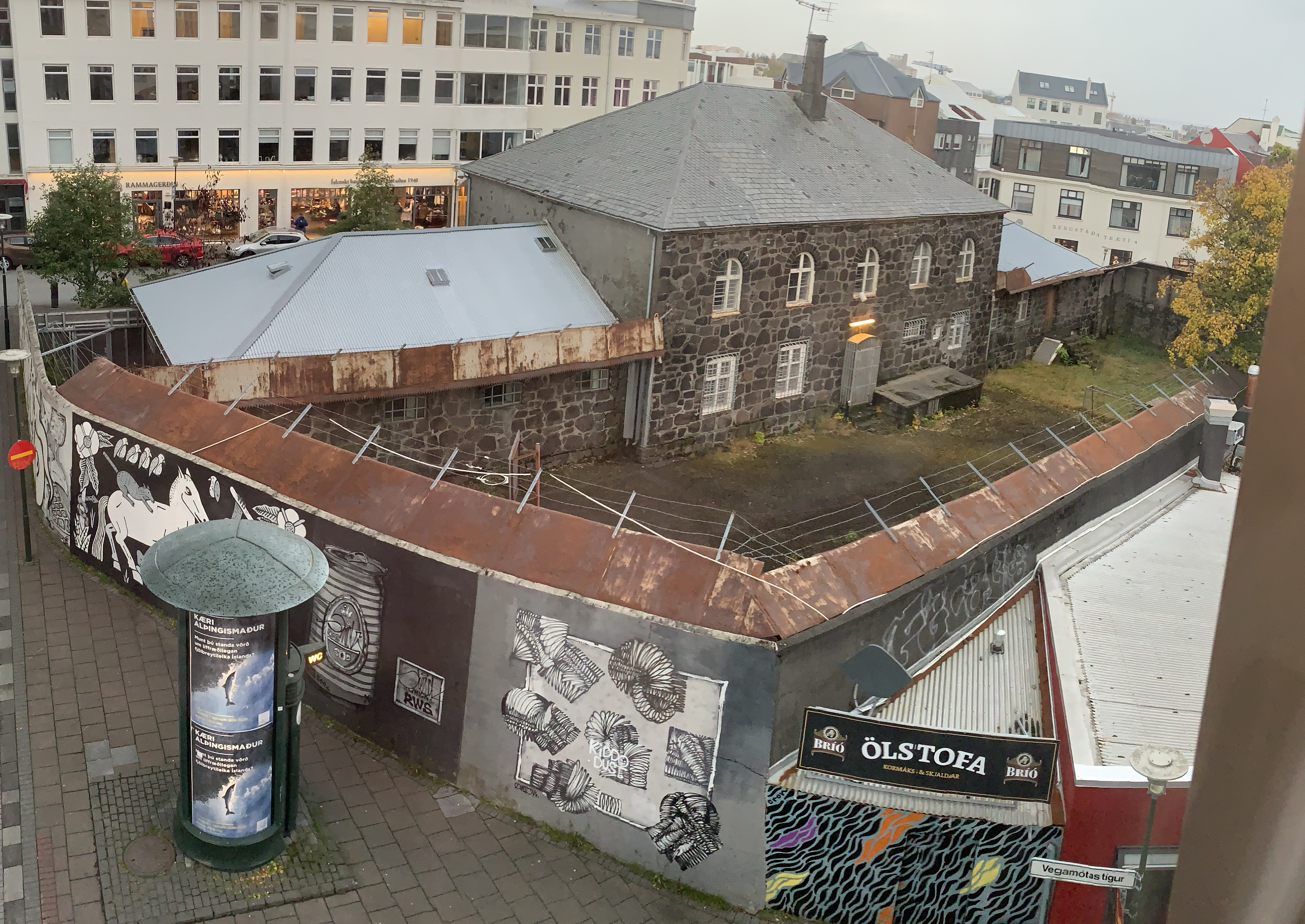
Hegningarhúsið exercise yard

The origins of the Icelandic phrase "going to the stone" (fara í steininn) is purportedly due to the stone interiors of this prison.

It was last used as a reception prison, where prisoners stayed for a short period of time when at the beginning of serving a sentence. The house was designated as historic property in 1978.

There were 16 prison cells in Hegningarhúsið, small and narrow with poor ventilation. The cells were without toilets and sinks.
