= Icelandic Police =

National police force of Iceland

Police Ríkislögreglan
- Official insignia
- Common name: Lögreglan (the police)
- Motto: Með lögum skal land byggja With laws shall lands be built

Agency overview
- Formed: 1778; 248 years ago
- Employees: c. 786 (2019)

Jurisdictional structure
- National agency: Iceland
- Operations jurisdiction: Iceland
- Area: 103,000 km^{2} (40,000 sq mi)
- Population: 389,444 (2025)
- Governing body: Icelandic government
- General nature: Civilian police

Operational structure
- Elected officer responsible: Þorbjörg Sigríður Gunnlaugsdóttir, Minister of Justice
- Agency executive: Halla Bergþóra Björnsdóttir, National Commissioner

Facilities
- Police cars and motorcycles: c. 300+ (2012)

Website
- www.logreglan.is

In Iceland, the Police (Icelandic: Ríkislögreglan, lit. 'the State Police') is the national police force of Iceland. It is responsible for law enforcement throughout the country, except in Icelandic territorial waters which fall under the jurisdiction of the Icelandic Coast Guard. Police affairs in Iceland are the responsibility of the Ministry of Justice and are administered by the Office of the National Commissioner of the Police (Embætti ríkislögreglustjóra) on behalf of the ministry. The organisation is divided into nine districts, the largest being the Reykjavík Metropolitan Police (Lögreglan á höfuðborgarsvæðinu), which is responsible for the Capital Region and its total population of around 208,000 people.

== History ==
=== Origins ===
The police can trace its origins to 1778 when the first traces of industry started to appear. Up until that time, the law had been enforced first by individuals permitted to do so by the Althing and then by sýslumenn (sheriffs) and other Royal proxies.

The first policemen are considered to be the morning star-armed night watchmen of Reykjavík who were commissioned primarily to deter the prisoners of the Reykjavík prison from breaking into the Innréttingarnar.

In 1803, the first proper policemen were commissioned in Reykjavík as it became a free town or kaupstaður. The first police chief was Rasmus Frydensberg, the town mayor, who hired two former soldiers, Ole Biørn and Vilhelm Nolte, as the first policemen. It was not until shortly after 1891 that policemen were hired in most of the other areas of Iceland.

=== Post-1900 ===
In 1933 Alþingi passed the Police Act which provided state participation in financing of police forces. This was done mostly in response to the threat of a communist revolution, whose capabilities had become apparent in a violent attempt to force the decisions of the Reykjavík city council, where a large part of the police forces went out of action as a result of physical injury. The act also authorized the Minister of Justice and Ecclesiastical affairs to call out reserves in critical situations.

In 1972 the state took over command of law enforcement in Iceland, creating the National Police and in 1977 State Criminal Investigation Police started operations under a special Director. The State Investigation Police took over investigations of criminal activities that previously were under the control of the Reykjavík Criminal Court and police commissioners in the Capital Region. The National Commissioner of the Police was formed in 1997, and the State Criminal Investigation Police was decommissioned.

=== 2013 Árbær shooting ===
On 2 December 2013, a person died due to an armed police operation for the first and currently only time in Iceland's history. Police had responded to reports of shotgun fire in an apartment in Árbær, a neighborhood of Reykjavík. Initially tear gas was used in an attempt to subdue the gunman, a 59-year-old man, but it failed to affect him.

When the special police unit entered the apartment in question, two officers were injured by shotgun fire. One officer was holding a ballistic shield which was hit. The other officer was hit in the head, but was wearing a ballistic helmet. Two officers with ballistic shields and pistols returned four shots, two of them striking the gunman. The gunman was taken to the hospital but pronounced dead upon arrival. National Police Commissioner Haraldur Johannessen immediately apologised to the man's family, calling the incident "unprecedented". The shooter's motives were not immediately clear, though some neighbours reported the gunman was making threats towards them. An investigation into this incident was launched, and the guns involved on all sides were seized. Counseling was offered to the officers involved. This still remains as the first and currently only shooting death involving the Icelandic Police in Iceland's history.

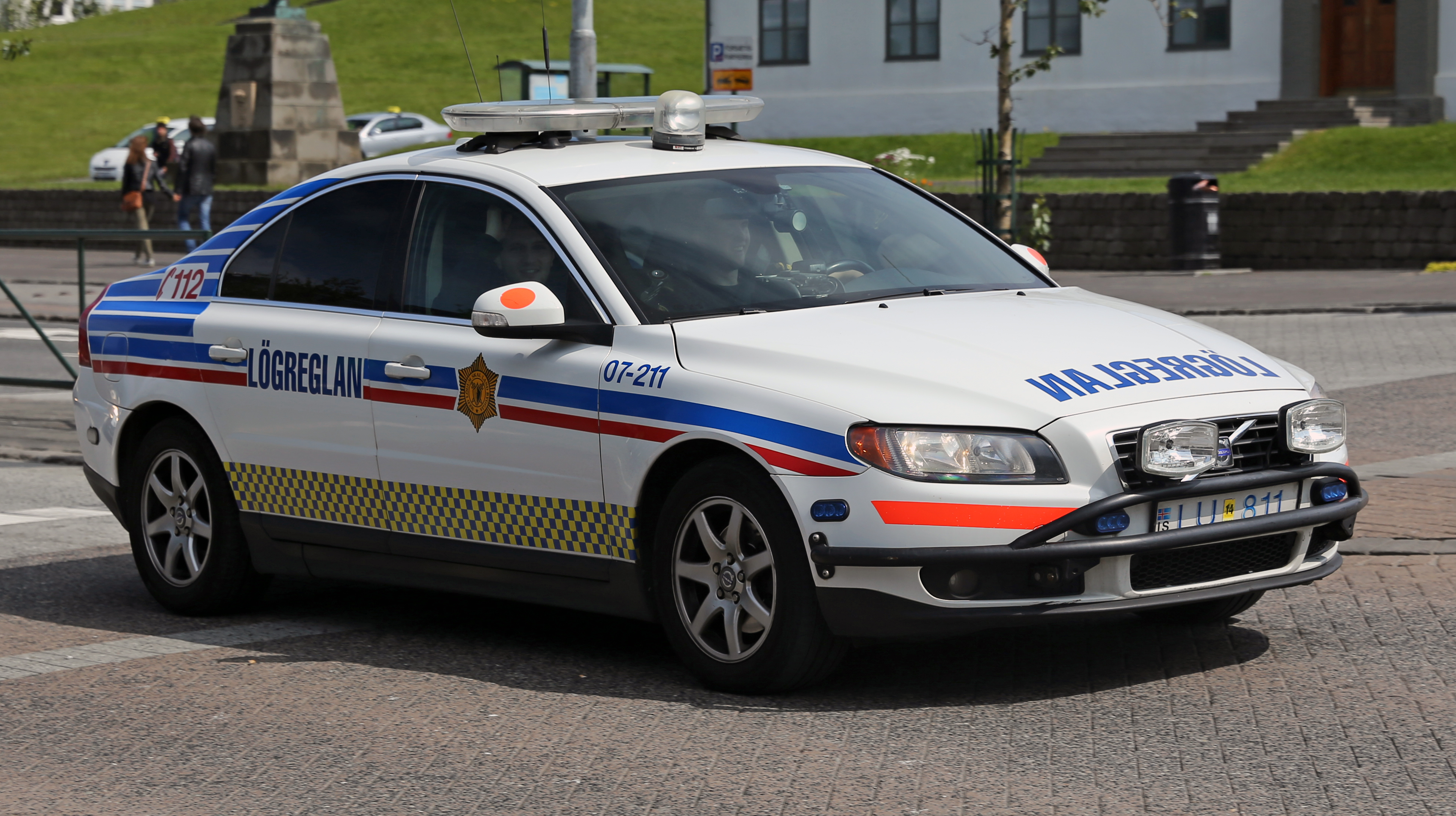
Volvo S80 D5 police car painted in the old livery

=== 2021 Egilsstaðir shooting ===
On the evening of 26 August 2021, a man armed with a shotgun and handgun started shooting at a car and house of the father of his girlfriend's children in Egilsstaðir, a small town in east Iceland. Police officers in Egilsstaðir responded armed with pistols. Officers repeatedly told the gunman to lay down his weapons and give up when he was inside the house. After about an hour, the man came out of the house and started shooting at the police officers taking cover behind cars in the driveway. One officer returned fire, striking the gunman in the chest. The gunman was quickly helped and transported by air ambulance to Reykjavík to be treated. The gunman survived and was sentenced to 8 years in prison. The incident marked the first time a normal police officer, not in the special armed police unit, fired a gun on duty.

=== 2022 terror plot ===
On 21 September 2022, the police arrested four individuals who were suspected of alleged terrorist plot, the first of its kind in the country, to attack various institutions and citizens of the state.

== Police academy ==
The police academy was shut down as of 30 September 2016 and the Ministry of Education, Science and Culture has decided to hand the responsibility of training future police officers to University of Akureyri (Icelandic: Háskólinn á Akureyri). Until then the police academy was its own independent institution under the Ministry of Interior. The police academy had previously been a non-university educational institution.

This decision was quite controversial as it went against what a committee (established by Central Public Procurement Icelandic: Ríkiskaup) had recommended, with training provided by the University of Iceland (Icelandic: Háskóli Íslands).

After the changes took place, cadets are now required to complete a two-year Police Science university diploma consisting of 120 ECTS credits. The practical training takes place at the Centre for Police Training and Professional Development (Icelandic: Mennta- og starfsþróunarsetur lögreglunnar), established June 1, 2016 to replace the police academy that was shut down the same year.

== Equipment ==
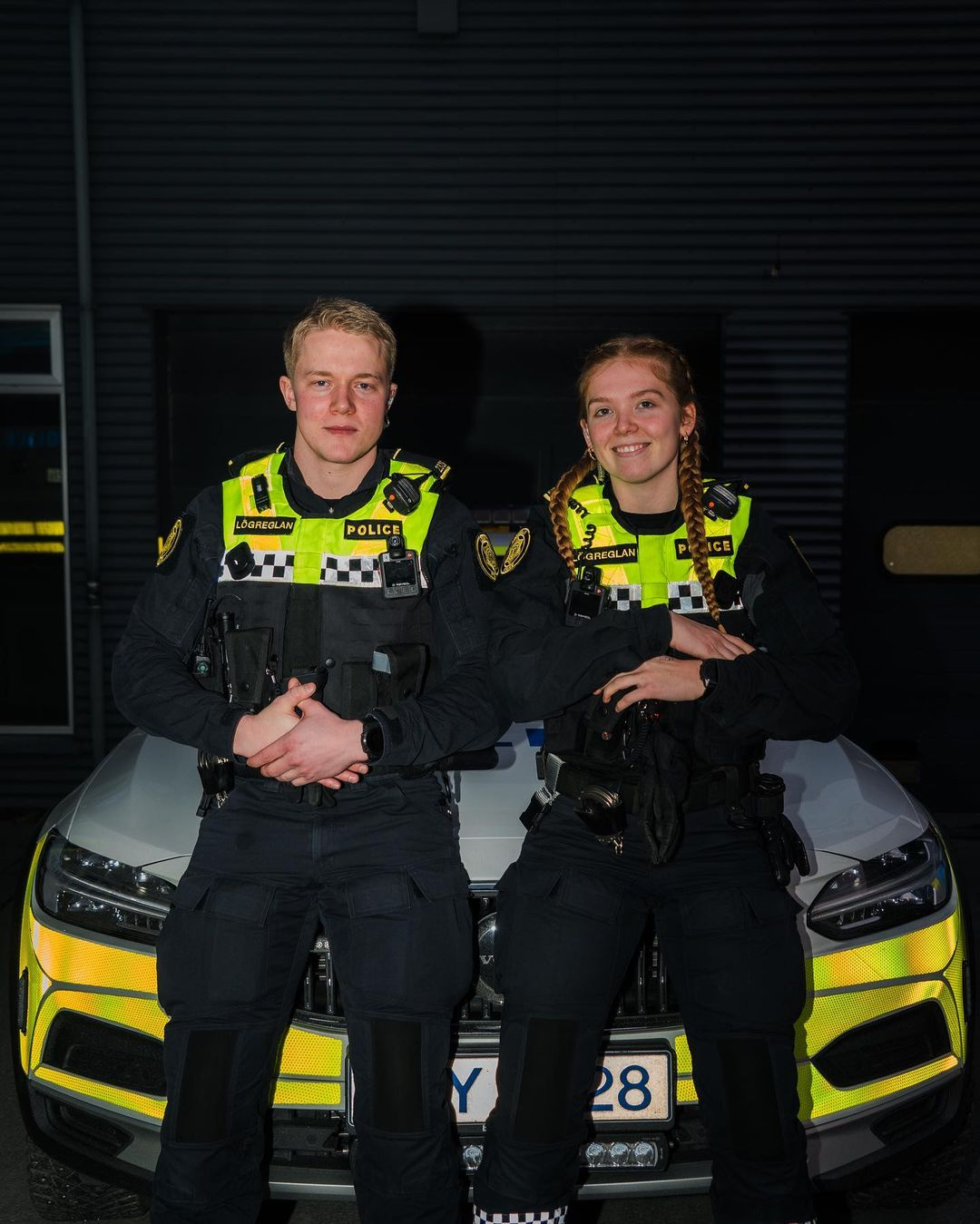
Two Icelandic police officers wearing new and updated police uniform as of 2023

=== Ranks ===
#	Title	English translation
1	Ríkislögreglustjóri	National Police Commissioner
2	Lögreglustjóri	Police Commissioner
2	Aðstoðarríkislögreglustjóri	Deputy National Police Commissioner
3	Aðstoðarlögreglustjóri	Deputy Police Commissioner
4	Yfirlögregluþjónn	Chief Superintendent
5	Aðstoðaryfirlögregluþjónn	Superintendent
6	Aðalvarðstjóri	Chief Inspector
6	Lögreglufulltrúi	Detective Chief Inspector
7	Varðstjóri	Inspector
7	Rannsóknarlögreglumaður	Detective Inspector
8	Lögreglumaður	Police Constable
9	Lögreglunemi	Police Cadet
9	Afleysingamaður í lögreglu	Temporary Replacement Police Constable
9	Héraðslögreglumaður	Temporarily Hired Constable

=== Uniform ===
The police wear black uniforms marked with traditional black and white checked markings and the police star. The working uniform varies from a traditional service uniform (shirt and trousers) to tactical overalls. The old traditional Icelandic service uniform is now used as a dress uniform. The trousers patrol officers use are made from a fire-resistant material.

=== Rank insignia ===
Insignia									
Title	Ríkislögreglustjóri		Lögreglustjóri	Aðstoðarríkislögreglustjóri	Aðstoðarlögreglustjóri	Yfirlögregluþjónn	Aðstoðaryfirlögregluþjónn	Aðalvarðstjóri	Lögreglufulltrúi
English translation	National Police Commissioner		Police Commissioner	Deputy National Police Commissioner	Deputy Police Commissioner	Chief Superintendent	Superintendent	Chief Inspector	Detective Chief Inspector
Insignia									
Title	Varðstjóri	Rannsóknarlögreglumaður	Lögreglumaður		Lögreglunemi	Afleysingamaður í lögreglu	Héraðslögreglumaður		
English translation	Inspector	Detective Inspector	Police Constable		Police Cadet	Temporary Replacement Constable	Temporarily Hired Constable		

=== Weaponry ===
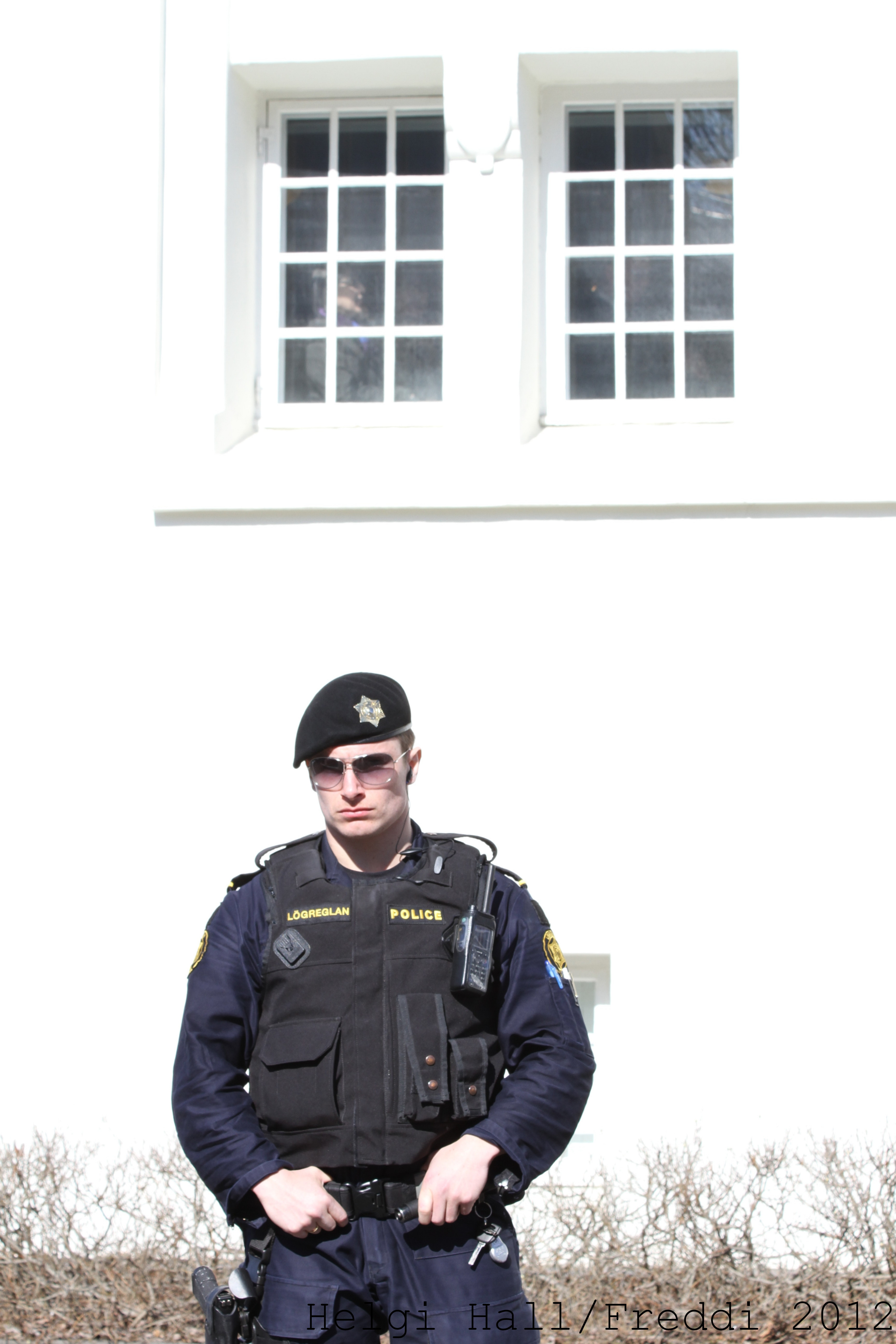
Armed police officer from Sérsveit ríkislögreglustjóra (Viking Squad)

Although police officers carry only extendable batons and MK-4 OC-spray (pepper spray) whilst on duty, some officers have started to carry tasers but they are trained in the use of firearms and are issued firearms in certain situations.

Most patrol vehicles are equipped with firearms in order to limit the response time needed in assignments that demand armed police. The firearms are stored in a special weapons locker. The special operations team, the Víkingasveitin, carry out their daily assignments armed.

Model	Origin	Type
Taser 10	United States	Less-lethal weapon
Brügger & Thomet LL06	Switzerland	Less-lethal weapon
Glock 17	Austria	Semi-automatic pistol
Heckler & Koch MP5	West Germany	Submachine gun
Mossberg 500	United States	Shotgun
Heckler & Koch G36	Germany	Assault rifle
SIG MCX	United States	Assault rifle
Blaser R93	Germany	Sniper rifle
Steyr SSG 69	Austria	Sniper rifle

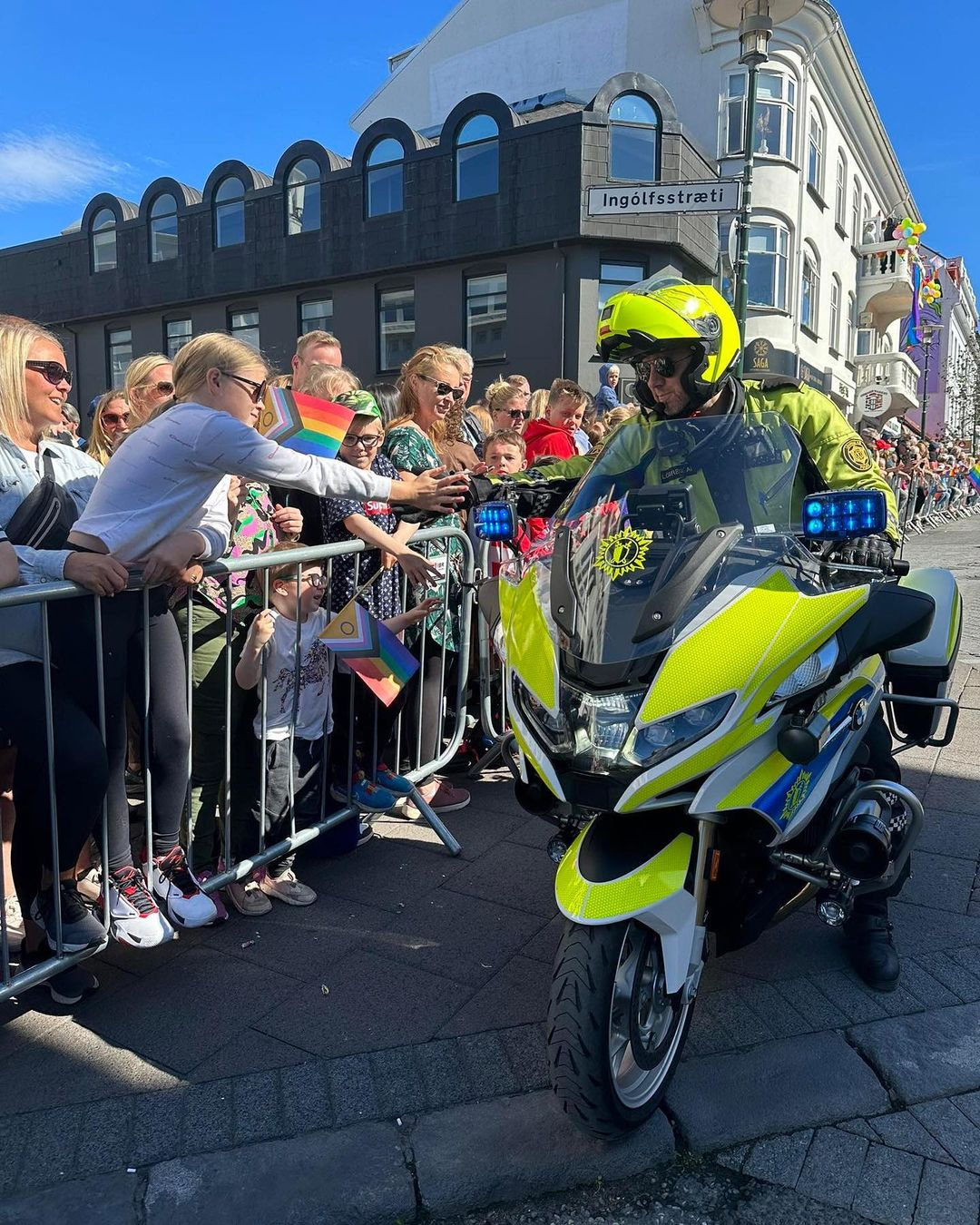
A police officer on a motorcycle

=== Transport ===
- (Germany) Volkswagen Transporter
- (Germany) BMW R1250RT
- (Germany) Mercedes-Benz Vito
- (Germany) Mercedes-Benz Sprinter
- (Germany) Mercedes-Benz EQB
- (Sweden) Volvo V90
- (Sweden) Volvo XC90
- (Germany) MAN TGE
- (United States) Ford Police Interceptor
- (United States) Ford Transit
- (United States) Chevrolet Suburban
- (United States) Ford Ranger
- (United States) Ford Explorer
- (United States) Tesla Model Y
- (United States) Ram pickup
- (Czech Republic) Škoda Superb
- (Czech Republic) Škoda Octavia
- (South Korea) Kia Sorento
- (South Korea) Kia EV6
- (South Korea) Huyundai Santa Fe
- (Japan) Yamaha FJR1300
- (United Kingdom) Land Rover Discovery
- (Japan) Toyota RAV4
- (Japan) Toyota Land Cruiser

In Iceland, police vehicles are white with the Icelandic word for "police", Lögreglan, written in blue letters.

Starting in Spring 2018, Volvo V90 Cross Country vehicles entered service with police districts across the country. The new vehicles were the first to use a new livery designed to improve visibility and were based on other European police vehicle liveries, retiring a livery that had been used by the Icelandic police since 2002.

The previous vehicle livery consisted of blue and red stripes with the police star overlaying the stripes on the front doors. All markings are made of reflective material and the emergency lights are all blue.

As of 2022 the regional districts own most of their cars while some of them are on long term rent from Bílaleiga Akureyrar. Previously the National Police Commissioner owned all of the police cars and the regional districts respectively rented them and paid both a per-kilometer fee and a fixed fee. The most common police cars are the Volvo V90 CC, Škoda Octavia and Superb, and the Land Rover Discovery.

The Víkingasveitin uses four unmarked Ford Police Interceptor Utility and unmarked Chevrolet Suburbans as well GMC Yukons that have been modified for tactical operations.

== Organisation ==
There are nine police districts in Iceland which follow the regions of Iceland with the addition of Vestmannaeyjar being its own district. The current police district division is stipulated by the Regulation on Police Districts of the Police Commissioner which was signed 4 December 2014 by Prime Minister Sigmundur Davíð Gunnlaugsson who acted as Minister of Justice temporarily within the Ministry of the Interior due to a scandal. The headquarters are administrative centres for their respective district and regular police stations.

A service sign depicting a police station

#	District	Headquarters	Police stations
1	Capital Region	Reykjavík	Reykjavík, Kópavogur, Hafnarfjörður, Grafarholt og Úlfarsárdalur
Municipal jurisdiction: Reykjavíkurborg, Seltjarnarnesbær, Mosfellsbær, Kjósarhreppur, Hafnarfjarðarkaupstaður, Garðabær and Kópavogsbær.
2	Western Region	Borgarnes	Akranes, Stykkishólmur, Búðardalur, Snæfellsbær, Grundarfjörður
Municipal jurisdiction: Akraneskaupstaður, Hvalfjarðarsveit, Skorradalshreppur, Borgarbyggð, Snæfellsbær, Eyja- og Miklaholtshreppur, Grundarfjarðarbær, Helgafellssveit, Stykkishólmsbær and Dalabyggð.
3	Westfjords	Ísafjörður	Bolungarvík, Hólmavík, Patreksfjörður
Municipal jurisdiction: Reykhólahreppur, Vesturbyggð, Tálknafjarðarhreppur, Bolungarvíkurkaupstaður, Ísafjarðarbær, Súðavíkurhreppur, Árneshreppur, Kaldrananeshreppur and Strandabyggð.
4	Northwestern Region	Sauðárkrókur	Blönduós
Municipal jurisdiction: Húnaþing vestra, Húnavatnshreppur, Blönduósbær, Sveitarfélagið Skagaströnd, Skagabyggð, Sveitarfélagið Skagafjörður and Akrahreppur.
5	Northeastern Region	Akureyri	Húsavík, Siglufjörður, Dalvík, Þórshöfn
Municipal jurisdiction: Fjallabyggð, Dalvíkurbyggð, Hörgársveit, Akureyrarkaupstaður, Eyjafjarðarsveit, Svalbarðsstrandarhreppur, Grýtubakkahreppur, Þingeyjarsveit, Skútustaðahreppur, Norðurþing, Tjörneshreppur, Svalbarðshreppur and Langanesbyggð.
6	Eastern Region	Eskifjörður	Egilsstaðir, Seyðisfjörður, Vopnafjörður, Neskaupstaður, Fáskrúðsfjörður, Stöðvarfjörður, Breiðdalsvík, Breiðdalur, Djúpivogur
Municipal jurisdiction: Vopnafjarðarhreppur, Sveitarfélagið Hornafjörður, Fljótsdalshreppur, Múlaþing, Fjarðabyggð.
7	Southern Region	Hvolsvöllur	Selfoss, Vík, Kirkjubæjarklaustur, Höfn
Municipal jurisdiction: Skaftárhreppur, Mýrdalshreppur, Rangárþing eystra, Rangárþing ytra, Ásahreppur, Sveitarfélagið Árborg, Flóahreppur, Skeiða- og Gnúpverjahreppur, Hrunamannahreppur, Bláskógabyggð, Grímsnes- og Grafningshreppur, Hveragerðisbær and Sveitarfélagið Ölfus.
8	Vestmannaeyjar	Vestmannaeyjabær	unspecified
Municipal jurisdiction: Vestmannaeyjabær.
9	Southern Peninsula	Reykjanesbær	Grindavík, Sandgerði, Garður, Vogar, Leif Eiriksson Air Terminal
Municipal jurisdiction: Grindavíkurbær, Sandgerðisbær, Sveitarfélagið Garður, Reykjanesbær and Sveitarfélagið Vogar.

== Intelligence services ==
In 1939, at the orders of then Prime Minister Hermann Jónasson, the State Police and the Útlendingaeftirlitið (Foreigner monitoring agency) founded a security department, or eftirgrennslanadeild in Icelandic. This service was founded primarily to monitor Nazi scientists in Iceland as well as communists. After World War II, this service had the embassies of communist countries under surveillance and compiled lists of communist sympathizers and potential saboteurs or terrorists. It was not until 2006 that this service was officially acknowledged, after having been known to only a handful of men for more than 60 years, after historians were granted limited access to secret documents.

The National Commissioner's National Security Unit (Icelandic: Greiningardeild Ríkislögreglustjóra), established in 2007, is currently responsible for internal intelligence activities which include evaluating threat to the constitution of the state such as terrorism or organized crime.

== See also ==
- Defence of Iceland
- Directorate of Customs
- Icelandic Prison Service
