= Defence of Iceland =

Combined military forces of Iceland

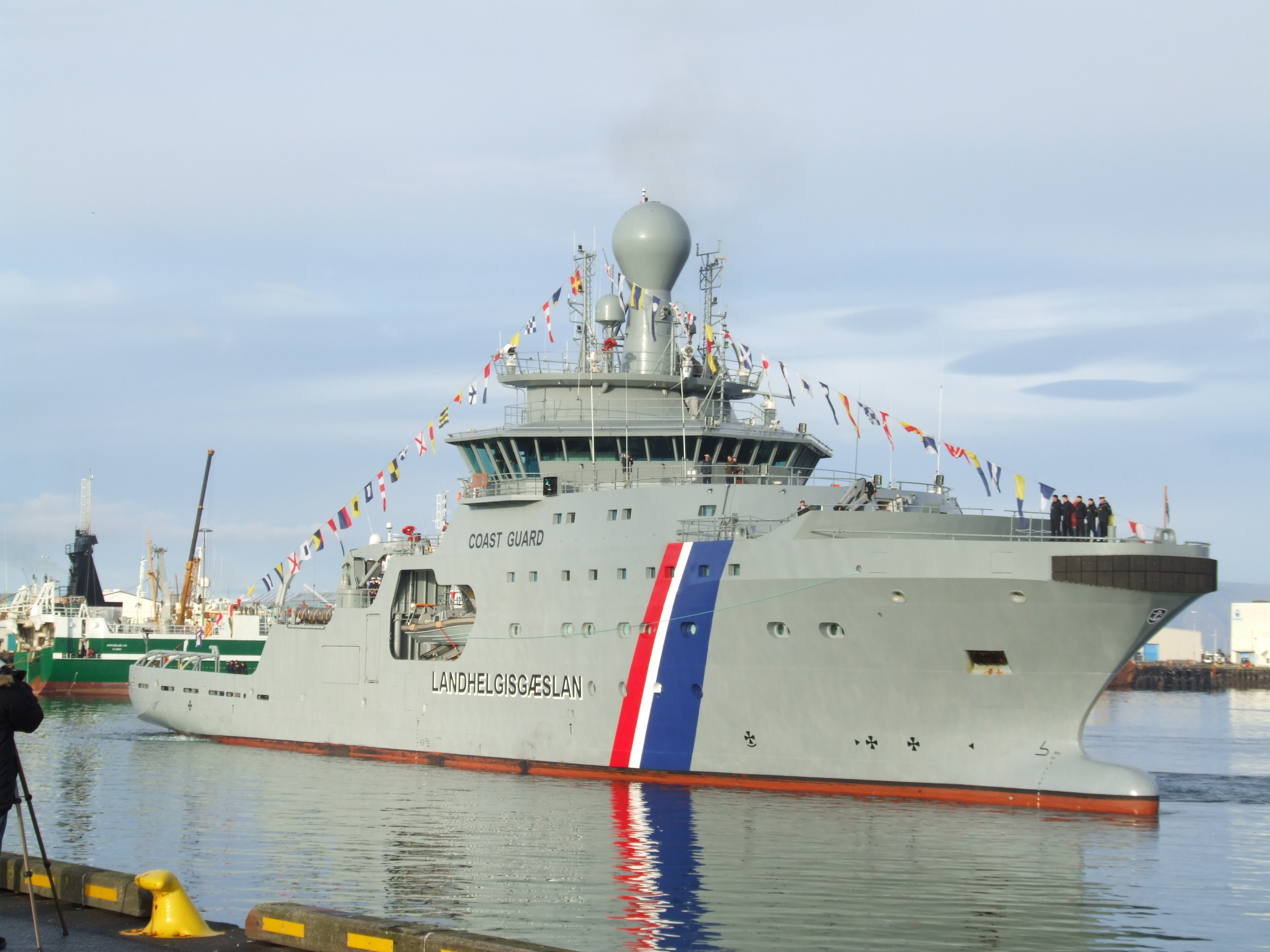
Icelandic Flagship ICGV Þór, 27 October 2011, Reykjavík.

Iceland's defence forces consist of the Icelandic Coast Guard, which patrols Icelandic waters and monitors its airspace, and other services such as the National Commissioner's National Security and the Special Unit of the National Police Commissioner. Iceland maintains no standing army, the only NATO member for which this is the case.

The Coast Guard operates three ships and four aircraft and is equipped with small arms, naval artillery, and air defence radar stations. The Coast Guard also maintains the Iceland Air Defence System, formerly part of the disestablished Defence Agency, which conducts surveillance from the ground of Iceland's airspace.

Additionally, there is a Crisis Response Unit (ICRU), operated by the Ministry for Foreign Affairs, which is a small peacekeeping force that has been deployed internationally since 2008. This unit also has an unarmed component.

There is a treaty with the United States, which until 2006 maintained the Naval Air Station Keflavik, regarding the defence of Iceland. The base, now operated by the Icelandic Coast Guard, has been regularly visited by the US military and other allied NATO members. In 2017 the United States announced its interest in renovating a hangar to accommodate a Boeing P-8 Poseidon ASW aircraft at the air base.

There are also agreements concerning military and other security operations with Norway, Denmark and other NATO countries.

Iceland hosts the annual NATO exercises entitled Northern Viking. The most recent exercises were held in 2024, as well as the EOD exercise "Northern Challenge". In 1997, Iceland hosted its first Partnership for Peace (PfP) exercise, "Cooperative Safeguard", which is the only multilateral PfP exercise so far in which Russia has participated. Another major PfP exercise was hosted in 2000. Iceland has also contributed ICRU peacekeepers to SFOR, KFOR and ISAF.

Iceland has never participated in a full-scale war or invasion. Furthermore, the constitution of Iceland has no mechanism to declare war.

== History ==
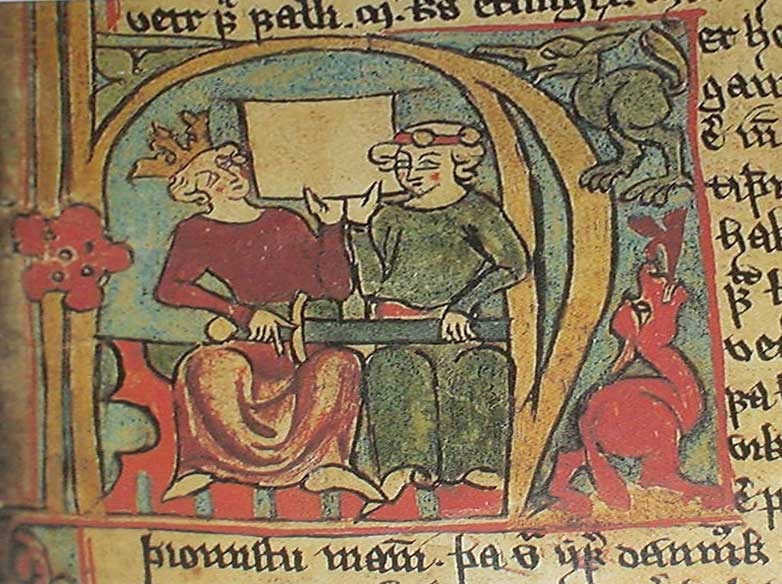
An illustration of Hákon Hákonarson, King of Norway, and Skúli Bárðarson from Flateyjarbók.

In the period from the settlement of Iceland, in the 870s, until it became part of the realm of the Norwegian King, military defences of Iceland consisted of multiple chieftains (Goðar) and their free followers (þingmenn, bændur or liðsmenn) organised according to the standard Nordic military doctrine of the time in expeditionary armies such as the leiðangr. These armies were divided into units according to the quality of the warriors and by birth. At the end of this period, the number of chieftains had diminished, and their power had grown, to the detriment of their followers. This resulted in a long and bloody civil war known as Age of the Sturlungs. A typical battle involved fewer than 1000 men.

Amphibious operations were an important part of warfare in Iceland in this period, especially in the Westfjords, but large naval engagements were rare. The largest such engagement, known as Flóabardagi, involved a few dozen ships in Húnaflói (bay).

In the decades before the Napoleonic Wars, the few hundred militiamen in the southwest of Iceland were mainly equipped with rusty and mostly obsolete medieval weaponry, including 16th-century halberds. When British privateers arrived in 1808, after most of the Royal Dano-Norwegian Navy had been captured or destroyed in the battle of Copenhagen in 1807, the amount of gunpowder in Iceland was so small that the governor of Iceland, Frederich Christopher Trampe, Count of Trampe, could not offer any resistance.

In 1855, Andreas August von Kohl, the sheriff in Vestmannaeyjar, wished to establish a citizen militia to protect the archipelago against foreign raiders and unruly fishermen. In 1856, the king provided 180 rixdollars to buy guns, and a further 200 rixdollars the following year. Kohl became the Captain of the new militia, which became known as Herfylkingin, "The Battalion". In 1860 von Kohl died, and Pétur Bjarnasen took over command. Nine years later Bjarnasen died without appointing a successor, and the militia ceased to exist.

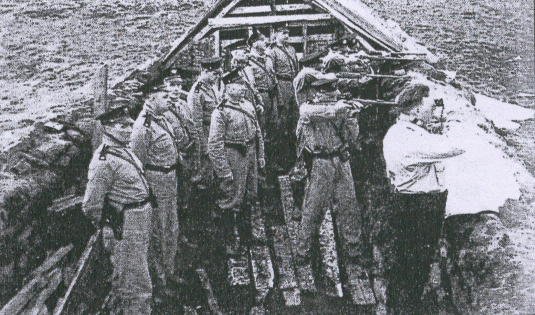
Officers of the defence force in a trench on Vaðlaheiði in 1940.

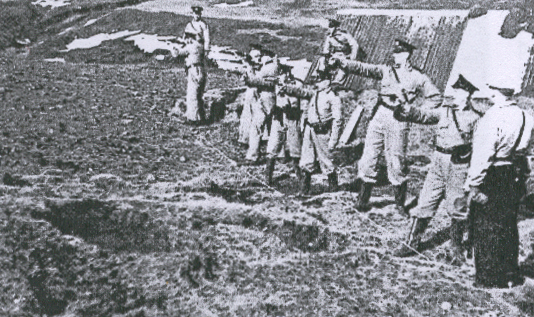
Agnar Kofoed Hansen training his officers in the arts of war in 1940.

In 1918, Iceland regained sovereignty as a separate kingdom under the Danish king. Iceland established a Coast Guard shortly afterwards, but it was financially impossible to establish a standing army. The government hoped that a permanent neutrality would shield the country from invasion. But at the onset of Second World War, the government was concerned about a possible invasion, and decided to expand the Icelandic National Police (Ríkislögreglan) and its reserves into a military unit. Chief Commissioner of Police Agnar Kofoed Hansen had been trained in the Danish Army and he moved to train his officers. Weapons and uniforms were acquired, and they practised rifleshooting and military tactics near Laugarvatn. Hansen barely managed to train his 60 officers before the United Kingdom's invasion of Iceland on 10 May 1940. Agnar wanted to expand the forces, but the Icelandic Minister of Justice rejected his proposal.

In mid-1941 while still neutral the United States took over the occupation of Iceland from the British but not with Iceland's approval. The stationing of US forces in Iceland continued well after the war, eventually codified in the Agreed Minute. In 1949 Iceland was a founding member of NATO and was the sole member that did not have a standing army, joining NATO on the condition that it would not be expected to establish one. However, its strategic geographic position in the Atlantic made it an invaluable member. Expansion of forces by Iceland was therefore concentrated primarily in the Icelandic Coast Guard, which saw action in a series of confrontations with British fishing vessels and Royal Navy warships known as the Cod Wars. None of the Cod Wars meet any of the common thresholds for a conventional war and they may more accurately be described as militarised interstate disputes.

The Iceland Defense Force (IDF) was a military command of the United States Armed Forces from 1951 to 2006. The IDF, created at the request of NATO, came into existence when the United States signed an agreement to provide for the defense of Iceland. The IDF also consisted of civilian Icelanders and military members of other NATO nations. The IDF was downsized after the end of the Cold War and the U.S. Air Force maintained four to six interceptor aircraft at the Naval Air Station Keflavik, until they were withdrawn on 30 September 2006. Since May 2008, NATO nations have periodically deployed fighters to patrol Icelandic airspace under the Icelandic Air Policing mission.

During the Icesave dispute with the British and Dutch governments, Iceland made it clear that UK patrols in its airspace were not appropriate given the state of affairs and subsequently on 14 November 2008 the UK had to cancel its patrols and defense of the Icelandic airspace, which before the dispute had been scheduled to start in December 2008.

After withdrawal of US forces in 2006, Iceland reorganized some military infrastructure in the form of the Icelandic Defence Agency (Varnarmálastofnun Íslands) founded in 2008. under the Minister for Foreign Affairs. The Agency took over operations at Naval Air Station Keflavik, but was closed in 2011 in the wake of the economic crisis, with functions distributed to the existing organizations. The Icelandic Coast Guard now handles the military infrastructure in the country.

== Coast Guard ==
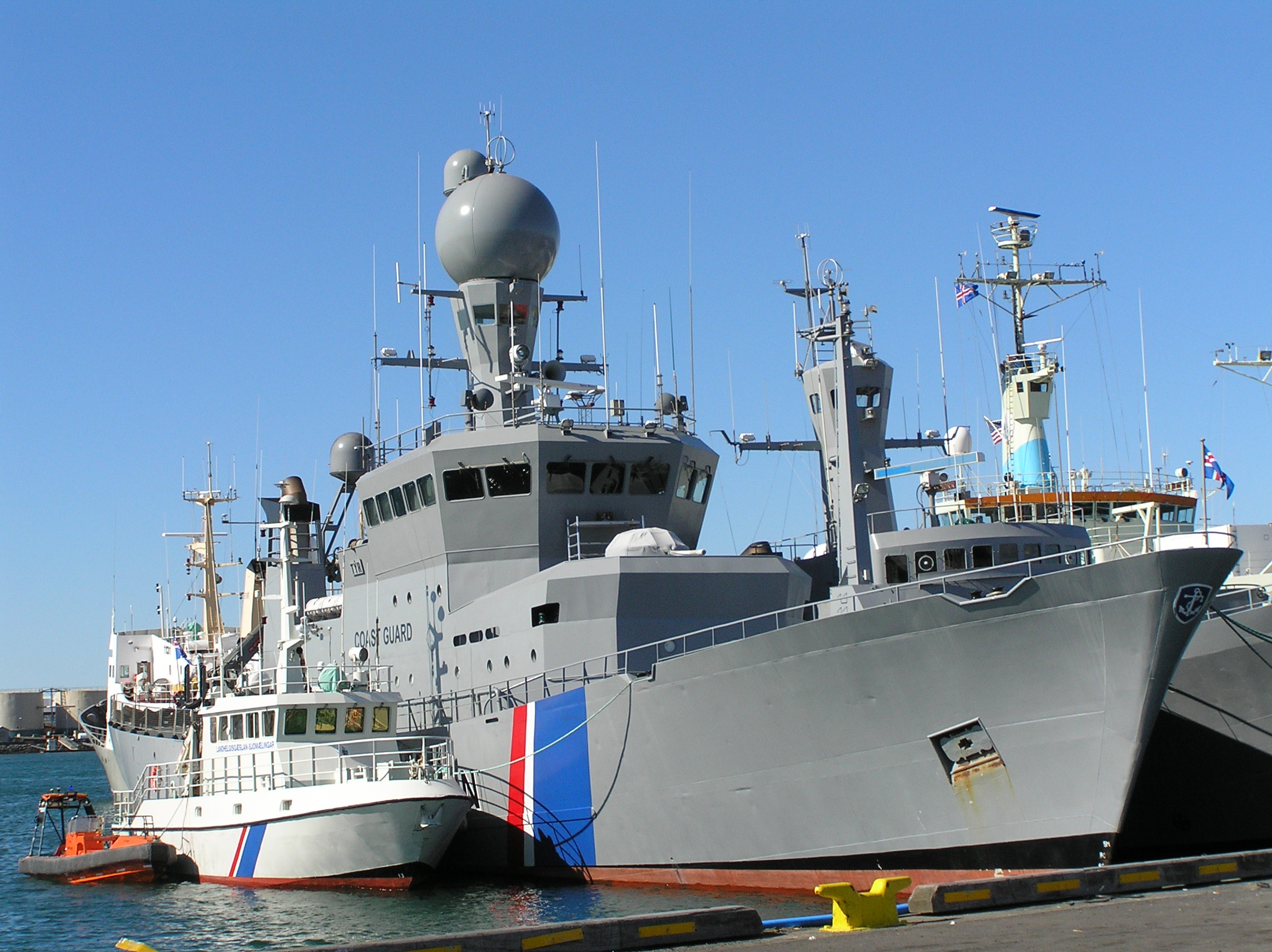
Icelandic Coast Guard vessels. Týr in the center.

Shortly after Iceland reclaimed its sovereignty in 1918, the Icelandic Coast Guard was founded. Its first vessel, a former Danish research vessel, was armed with a 57 mm cannon.

The Coast Guard is responsible for protecting Iceland's sovereignty and vital interests including the most valuable natural resource—its fishing areas—as well as providing security, search, and rescue services to Iceland's fishing fleet. In 1952, 1958, 1972, and 1975, the government progressively expanded Iceland's exclusive economic zone to 4, 12, 50, and 200 nautical miles (7, 22, 93, and 370 kilometres). This led to a conflict with the United Kingdom, among other states, known as the "Cod Wars".

The Icelandic Coast Guard and the Royal Navy confronted each other on several occasions during these years. Although few rounds were fired, there were many intense moments. Today the Coast Guard remains Iceland's premier fighting force equipped with armed patrol vessels and aircraft and partaking in peacekeeping operations in foreign lands.

The Coast Guard has four vessels and four aircraft (one fixed wing and three helicopters) at their disposal.

=== Iceland Air Defence System ===
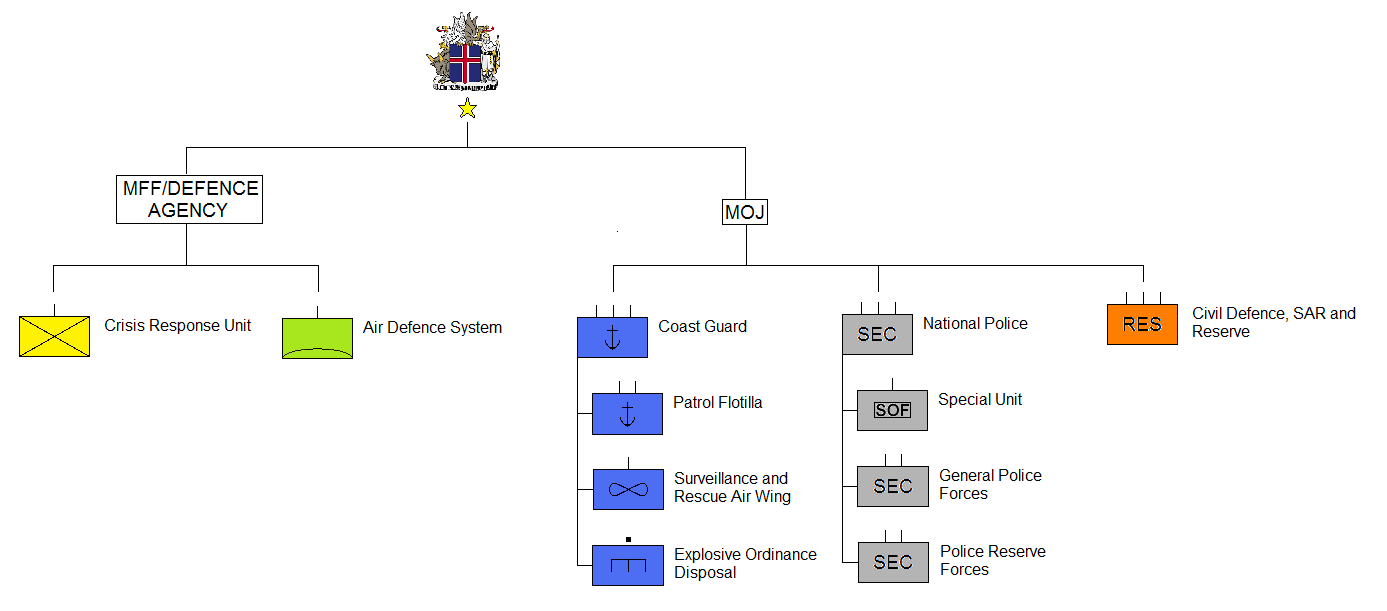
Structure of the Icelandic Forces

The Iceland Air Defence System or Íslenska Loftvarnarkerfið was founded in 1987, and operates four radar complexes, a software and support facility and a command and report centre. It is a part of the Coast Guard.

Iceland's NATO allies also regularly deploy fighter aircraft to patrol the country's airspace as part of the Icelandic Air Policing mission.

== Icelandic Crisis Response Unit ==
The Icelandic Crisis Response Unit (ICRU) (or Íslenska friðargæslan or "The Icelandic Peacekeeping Guard") is an expeditionary peacekeeping force maintained by the Ministry for Foreign Affairs. It is composed of personnel from Iceland's other services, armed or not, including the National Police, Coast Guard, emergency services and healthcare system. Because of the military nature of most of the ICRU's assignments, all of its members receive basic infantry combat training. This training has often been conducted by the Norwegian Army, but the Coast Guard and the Special Forces are also assigned to train the ICRU.

Most of the ICRU's camouflage and weaponry is procured from abroad, with some indigenous development. Some arms and uniforms are also borrowed from the Norwegian Defence Forces.

The formation and employment of the unit have met controversy in Iceland, especially by people on the left of the political scale. In October 2004, three ICRU personnel were wounded in a suicide bombing on Chicken Street in Kabul that killed a 13-year old Afghan girl and a 23-year old American woman. The incident resulted in severe criticism of the group's commander, Colonel Hallgrímur Sigurðsson, as despite orders not to leave Kabul Airport unless absolutely necessary, he took the group to Chicken Street to shop carpets. Few weeks later, his command was passed to Lt. Colonel Garðar Forberg, followed by Colonel Lárus Atlason.

In 2008, the uniformed ICRU deployed personnel still armed for self-defense returned their weapons and changed to civilian clothing. The policy since 2008 is that, unless under special circumstances, ICRU personnel do not wear uniforms or carry weapons.

=== ICRU missions ===
The ICRU has been or is operating in:

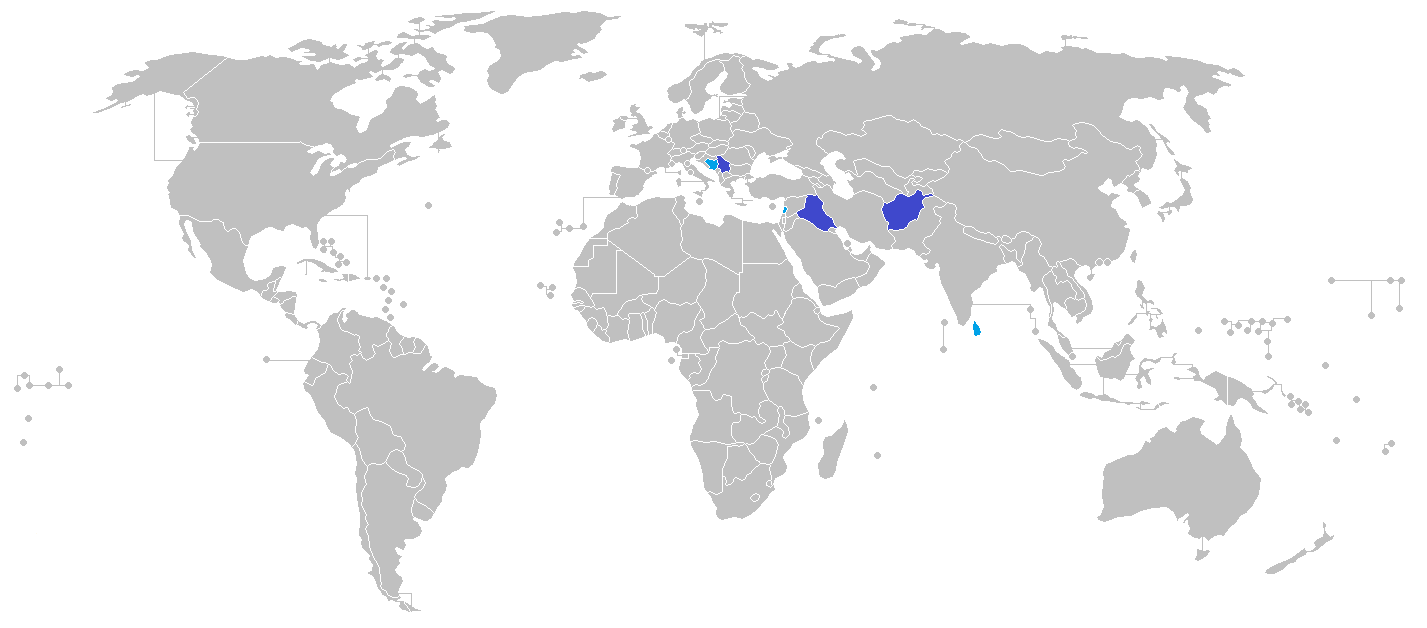
ICRU missions

==== Military missions ====
- Afghanistan within ISAF
- Iraq within NTM-1 (and the Coast Guard within Dancon/Irak)
- Kosovo, within KFOR

==== Civilian missions ====
- Bosnia and Herzegovina within EUPM
- Lebanon within the Mine Action Coordination Center for South Lebanon (MACC-SL)
- Sri Lanka within Sri Lanka Monitoring Mission

== List of small-arms used by Icelandic forces ==
- (Austria) Glock 17 — Sidearm (Pistol)
- (Norway) AG-3 — Battle Rifle
- (Germany) Heckler & Koch MP5 — Sub-Machine Gun
- (Germany) Blaser R93 — Sniper Rifle
- (Germany) Rheinmetall MG3 – General-Purpose Machine Gun

== See also ==
- List of countries without armed forces
- List of wars involving Iceland
- GIUK gap
