= Hvolsvöllur =

- Town
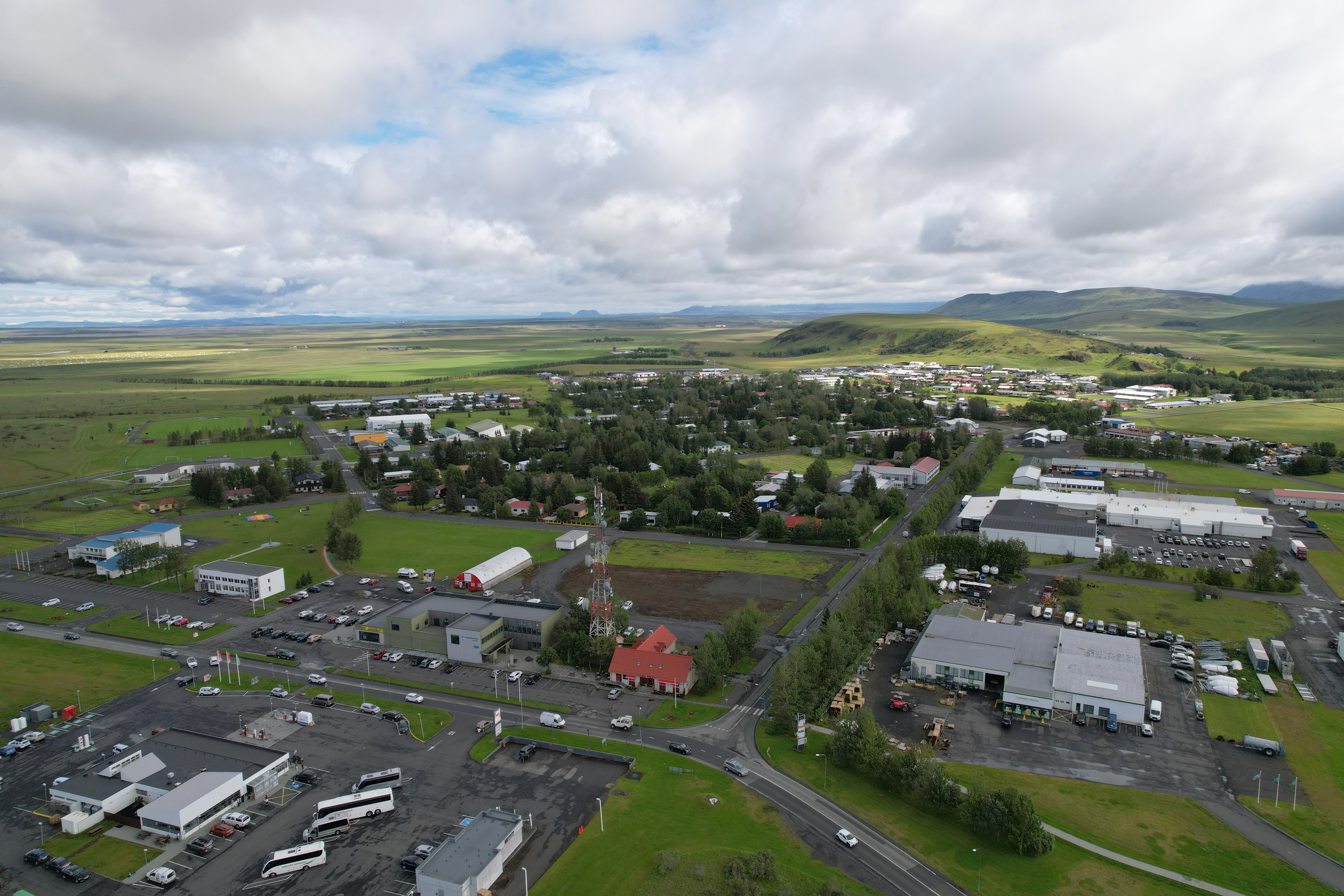

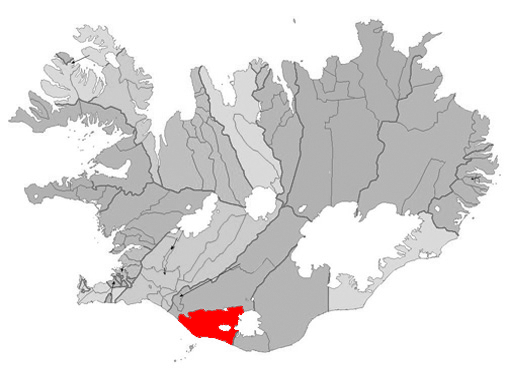
- Location of the Municipality of Rangárþing eystra

- Location in Iceland
- Coordinates: 63°45′N 20°14′W
- Country: Iceland
- Constituency: South Constituency
- Region: Southern Region
- Municipality: Rangárþing eystra
- First settled: 2nd of September 1933

Government
  - Type: Council–manager
  - Mayor: Anton Kári Halldórsson

Population (2023)
  - Total: 1,108
- Time zone: UTC+0 (GMT)
- Postal code: 860
- Website: www.hvolsvollur.is www.visithvolsvollur.is

Hvolsvöllur (Icelandic pronunciation: [ˈkʰvɔlsˌvœtlʏr̥, ˈxʷɔls-]) is a town in the south of Iceland about 106 km to the east of Reykjavík.

== Overview ==
The name of the town literally translates to "Hillfield". Hvoll [ˈkʰvɔtl̥, ˈxʷɔtl̥] (hvols [ˈkʰvɔls, ˈxʷɔls] in the genitive case) is an archaic form of the modern Icelandic word hóll [ˈhoutl̥], meaning "hill", and völlur [ˈvœtlʏr̥] means "field". The name is derived from the name of the historic farm Stórólfshvoll ([ˈstouːroul(f)sˌkʰvɔtl̥, -ˌxʷɔtl̥], "Stórólfur's hill").

The town of Hvolsvöllur has a population of 1,108 inhabitants. Around 900 people live the wider municipality (surrounding rural area).

The Ring Road (Route 1) passes through the town. 30 km east of Hvolsvöllur is the recently constructed port of Landeyjahöfn, where the ferry to Vestmannaeyjar (Westman Islands) operates from. Hvolsvöllur is notable in that it is one of the only Icelandic towns which is not situated on the coast or by a river.

The town's economy is largely based on the service and tourism industry. It is an important service point for travellers and the local rural population serving large part of southern Iceland, the next town being Vík, 80 km to the east. The largest single employer in the area is Sláturfélag Suðurlands (SS), which has a large meat processing plant in the town - it notably manufactures the Icelandic SS hot dog.

The town has one of the best kindergarten and primary schools in the country, as well as a sports centre housing an outdoor swimming pool. The town has a geothermal district heating system, operated since 1981 using a 95 °C geothermal borehole from Laugaland. The transmission pipe from the borehole to the town is 23 km long. The same system also serves Hella as well as the surrounding rural area and is currently owned by Orkuveita Reykjavíkur.

In 2010, the volcanic eruptions at Eyjafjallajökull caused evacuations in the surrounding area, with people being relocated to Hvolsvöllur, where Red Cross mass care centres had been set up.

=== Points of Interest ===
The area is the scene of a well-known saga of Iceland, Njál's saga. Hvolsvöllur houses the LAVA Museum which focusus on Iceland's volcanic and geological history.

Stórólfshvolskirkja [ˈstouːroul(f)sˌkʰvɔlsˌcʰɪr̥ca, -ˌxʷɔls-] is a Protestant church in Hvolsvöllur. It was built in 1930 and can seat 120 people. The interior was painted in 1955. Above the altar there is a painting by Þórarin B. Þorláksson, an Icelandic painter, dating from 1914 which shows Jesus blessing the children.

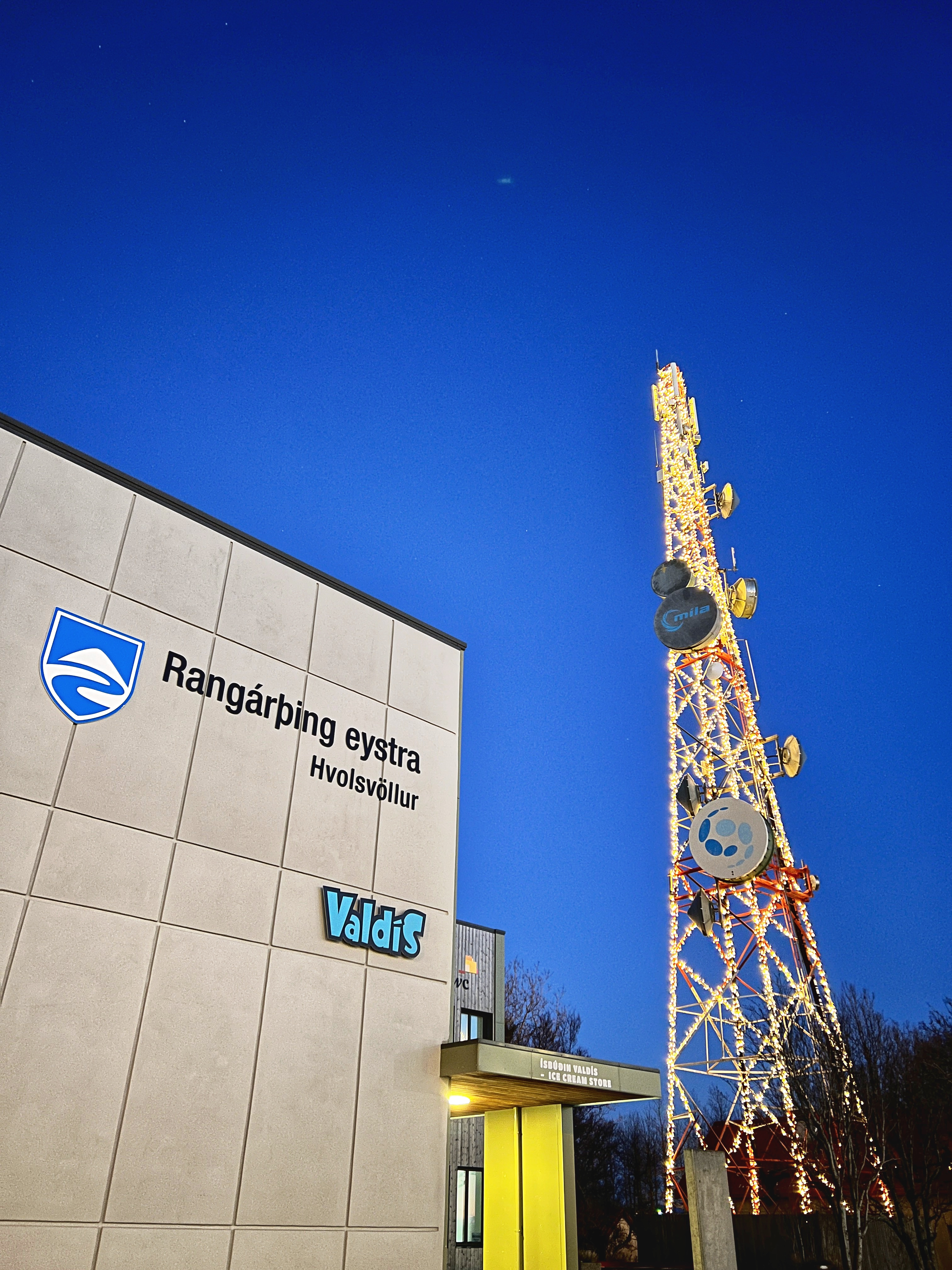
Tallest Christmas lights in Iceland

At the centre of the town is a 45m tall telecommunications tower, erected in 1976 and operated by Míla. In 2022 the tower was fitted with Christmas lights, which were lit up during the winter, claiming to be the 'tallest Christmas lights in Iceland'.

== Climate ==
Similar to the rest of the southern coast of Iceland, Hvolsvöllur has a subpolar oceanic climate (Köppen: Cfc) with cool summers and cold winters, although relatively mild for its high latitude. Precipitation is abundant year round, with October usually seeing the most precipitation.

Climate data for Sámsstaðir, 6 km (3.7 mi) from Hvolsvöllur (1961–1990)
Month	Jan	Feb	Mar	Apr	May	Jun	Jul	Aug	Sep	Oct	Nov	Dec	Year
Record high °C (°F)	10.9 (51.6)	12.0 (53.6)	17.9 (64.2)	15.4 (59.7)	22.1 (71.8)	21.5 (70.7)	24.0 (75.2)	22.1 (71.8)	20.2 (68.4)	15.9 (60.6)	12.2 (54.0)	10.8 (51.4)	24.0 (75.2)
Mean daily maximum °C (°F)	2.2 (36.0)	3.0 (37.4)	3.6 (38.5)	6.5 (43.7)	10.3 (50.5)	12.6 (54.7)	14.3 (57.7)	13.8 (56.8)	10.7 (51.3)	7.3 (45.1)	3.5 (38.3)	2.4 (36.3)	7.5 (45.5)
Daily mean °C (°F)	−0.3 (31.5)	0.5 (32.9)	0.8 (33.4)	3.4 (38.1)	6.8 (44.2)	9.4 (48.9)	11.0 (51.8)	10.5 (50.9)	7.4 (45.3)	4.5 (40.1)	1.1 (34.0)	−0.2 (31.6)	4.6 (40.3)
Mean daily minimum °C (°F)	−3.2 (26.2)	−2.2 (28.0)	−2.1 (28.2)	0.2 (32.4)	3.4 (38.1)	6.3 (43.3)	7.9 (46.2)	7.4 (45.3)	4.6 (40.3)	1.9 (35.4)	−1.6 (29.1)	−3.0 (26.6)	1.6 (34.9)
Record low °C (°F)	−17.9 (−0.2)	−19.1 (−2.4)	−17.0 (1.4)	−19.2 (−2.6)	−8.0 (17.6)	−2.4 (27.7)	1.0 (33.8)	0.0 (32.0)	−4.1 (24.6)	−12.5 (9.5)	−17.9 (−0.2)	−18.2 (−0.8)	−19.2 (−2.6)
Average precipitation mm (inches)	110.8 (4.36)	112.3 (4.42)	113.3 (4.46)	91.7 (3.61)	68.6 (2.70)	85.8 (3.38)	85.7 (3.37)	105.7 (4.16)	102.4 (4.03)	128.3 (5.05)	113.0 (4.45)	119.8 (4.72)	1,237.2 (48.71)
Average precipitation days (≥ 0.1 mm)	16.5	16.1	17.7	15.8	14.9	16.3	16.4	16.9	16.8	18.5	15.5	17.4	199.2
Mean monthly sunshine hours	28.2	50.8	99.0	138.2	175.4	151.1	159.0	145.1	120.6	80.1	43.5	16.9	1,207.9
Source 1: Icelandic Met Office (monthly sunshine hours 1963-92)
Source 2: Icelandic Met Office (monthly precipitation days for Bjóla-12 km (7.5 mi) from Hvolsvöllur)

== Sports ==
- Ungmennafélagið Hekla
- Knattspyrnufélag Rangæinga

== See also ==
- List of cities in Iceland
- Southern Iceland
- Rangarþing eystra
