= The Caves of Ægissíða =

Ancient man-made sandstone caves in Iceland

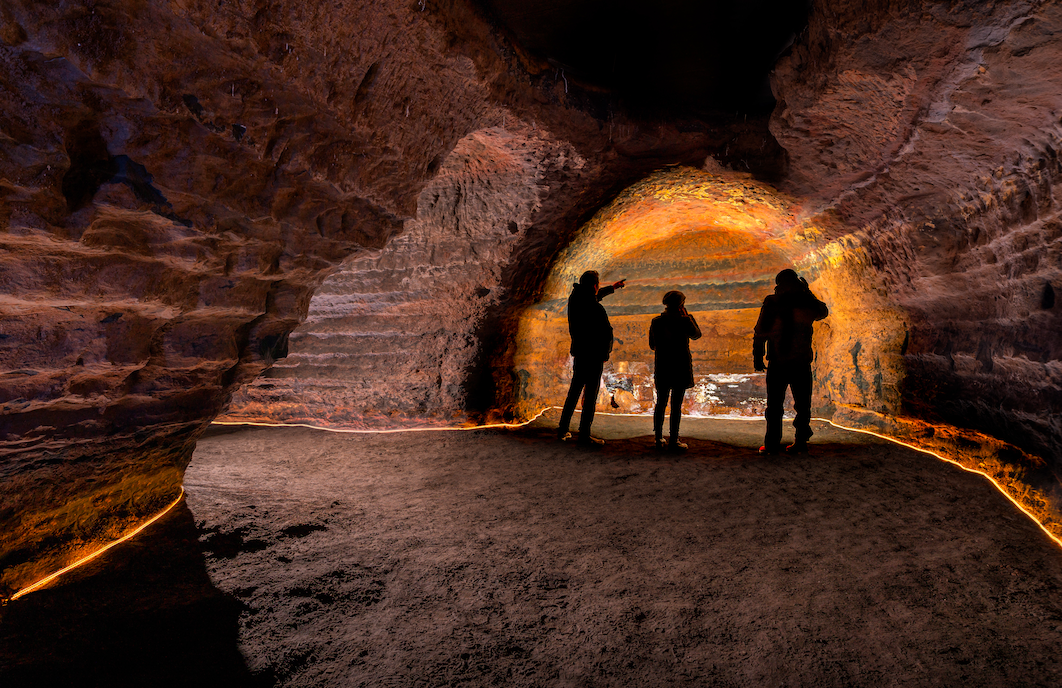
Inside Barn Cave, one of the biggest man-made caves in Iceland

The Caves of Hella (Icelandic pronunciation: [ˈhɛtla]; also known as the Caves of Ægissíða [ˈaijɪsˌsiːða]) are a series of ancient man-made sandstone caves located at the farm Ægissíða on the bank of the river Ytri-Rangá, just across from the village Hella, in the southern part of Iceland. Through the past centuries the caves have been used by Icelandic farmers as sheep sheds, barns and, food storage. Nobody knows for certain who made them and for what purpose. However, throughout the centuries the people of Ægissíða have said the caves were built before the Viking settlement, most likely by Celtic monks.

== General ==
The first written source about a man-made sand cave can be found in Jarteinabækur Þorláks helga that was written in 1199. The story is about bulls inside a cave that collapses. The story focuses on the bulls and not the cave, which indicates that at that time it was not unusual to use man-made caves to store animals as early as the 12th century.

Before the 19th century Icelanders used to live in turf houses. These houses only lasted a century and had to be rebuilt after that. Therefore, it was convenient to use the caves. This also means that the caves are, by far, the oldest standing “buildings” in Iceland.

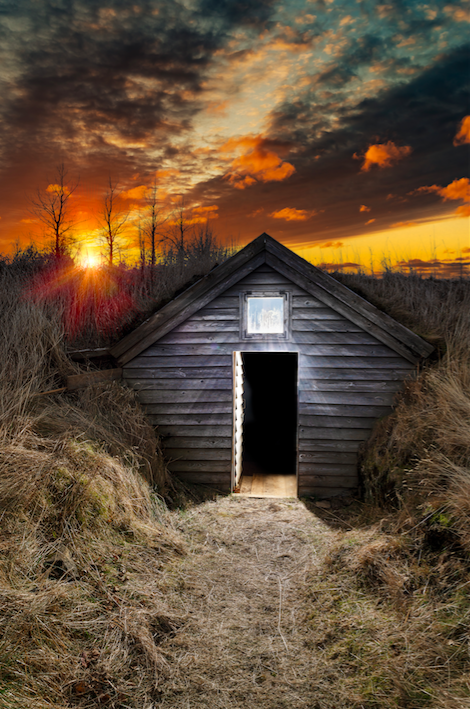
Entrance to Cow Shed Cave

According to Landnámabók and Íslendingabók, Celtic monks from Ireland known as papar lived in Iceland before Scandinavian Vikings settled in Iceland. Many Icelandic scholars have pointed out that the caves might have been built before the Viking settlement. Other scholars have denied these theories on the grounds that no archaeological remains have been found that proof that the papar were in Iceland before the island was settled around 874.

The caves are protected by law, as national heritage.

== The Caves of Hella or Ægissíða ==
The first written sources of the caves in Ægissíða are in a poem from the late 18th century, where the author names eighteen caves at Ægissíða. In 1818 a priest in Oddi writes about the caves at Ægissíða and emphasizes in his writings that the caves are very old. Although over 200 man-made caves can be found in the southern part of Iceland, it is unheard of to find as many caves together as at Ægissíða. Twelve caves have been found at Ægissíða. The most recent one found in 2016.

The most famous cave is Fjóshellir or Cow Shed Cave as it is one of the biggest man-made sand caves that has been found in Iceland. Furthermore, a cross can be found embossed in one of the walls at Fjóshellir. Nobody knows who made the cross and what for. Another cave bears the interesting name ‘the Church’. It used to have a beautifully rounded ceiling before water damaged demolished it. Also, an unusual 25 meter long tunnel can be found between two of the largest caves Barn Cave and Lamb Shed Cave. The caves are all beautifully handmade and their original structure is clearly visible where water damage has not taken its toll.

The descendants of Ægissíða have always believed that the caves date back to the settlement and believe they are the handiwork of Celts.

== The name, Ægissíða ==
The name of the farm can be found in written source from 1270.

== Modern interest ==
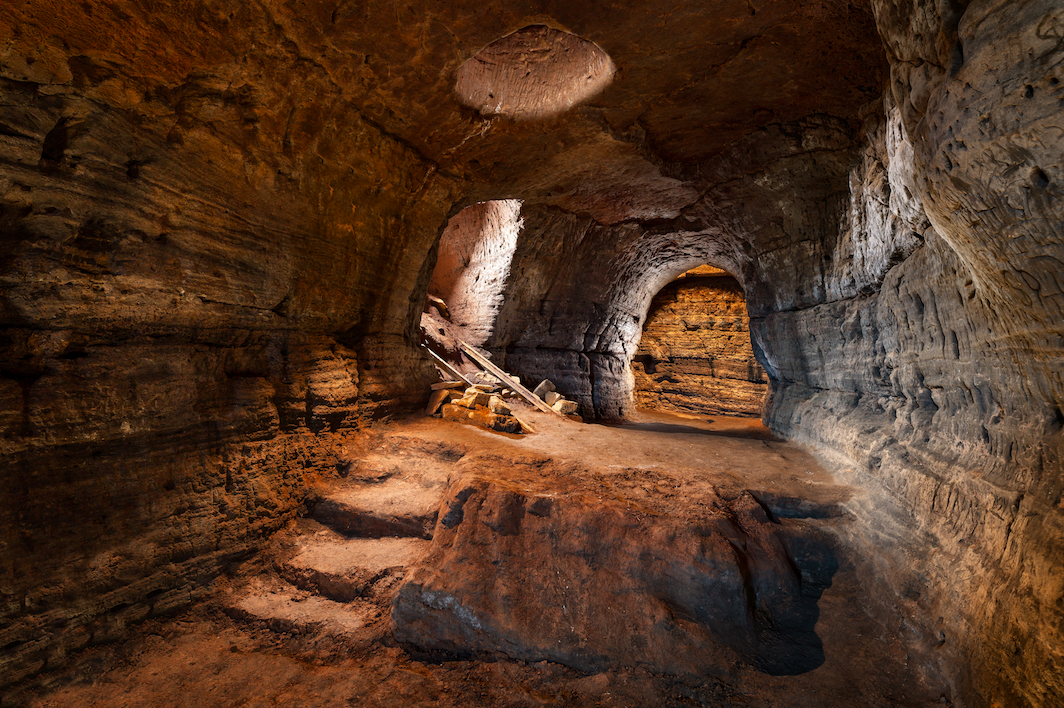
Cow Shed Cave

For centuries the caves have been a source of interest for many people both foreign and Icelandic and many found their mystery interesting. Many school trips stopped at Ægissíða and, well known historians, writers and poets wrote about the caves. In the 1970s and early 1980s, The caves were a common very popular tourist attraction and could be found in most almost all tourist books.

The Icelandic poet and lawyer Einar Benediktsson was very interested in the caves and was one of the key figures in exploiting the theories about the Irish monks building them. Later on the Icelandic writer Þórbergur Þórðarson investigated the caves. He disagreed with Einar Benediktsson about the origin of the caves. Matthías Þórðarson, the director of the National museum of Iceland came to the conclusion that the caves were ancient but nothing suggested they were made before Iceland was settled. Einar Benediktsson had his friend and painter Jóhannes Kjarval sketch the cave murals. The Icelandic poet and priest, Matthías Jochumsson held a mass in one of the caves known as Kirkjuhellir or Church-cave (named for his similarity to an old church). The caves at Ægissíða are a part of Yrsa Sigurðardóttir's first crime novel, Last Rituals, and the sand caves are also mentioned in Blóðug jörð by Vilborg Davíðsdóttir.

But interest in the caves is not only found with Icelanders. In 1936 the Ahnenerbe (a Nazi institute that investigated the history of the Aryan race) organised an expedition to Iceland to investigate ancient temples. When they arrived they got thrilled by the man-made caves and assumed that they might have been an ancient Hof. All investigations were drawn to a halt because of World War II.

However, farmers stopped utilizing the caves and repairing their entrances, when it became cheaper and easier to build concrete houses to store animals and food. Unfortunately, in the late 20th century and early 21st century many caves stood open to winds, rain and snow damage.

The caves were closed to the public until recently. In 2016 descendants of Ægissíða gathered all known information, written and oral stories, about the caves. The family also began working with archaeologists to excavate and restore the caves. The farmers restored the caves in order to protect them from weather damage and make them accessible to tourists. Interestingly, in 2017, they discovered a new 25 meter long cave and a new 6 meter long side cave while digging out a part of cave which has not been full of mold for centuries.

Over time, they made four caves accessible by the summer of 2020, while continuing efforts to restore the remaining caves. During this process, they founded The Caves of Hella in 2019 and offer now daily guided tours. By the summer of 2025 they have made five caves accessible. Through these tours, they share the stories of the caves with the public—reaching tourists as well as Icelandic travellers and locals alike. Visitors are shown all five caves, three of which are large enough to enter and comfortably accommodate groups. The site also hosts a variety of events, including mass, acoustic concerts, weddings, and more.

The season 3 of the Netflix mystery thriller series Entrapped was filmed at the caves.
