= Rangárþing =

Rangárþing, or Rangárthing, may refer to a pair of Icelandic municipalities:

- Rangárþing eystra
- Rangárþing ytra

See also

- Rangárvallasýsla, a county of Iceland
