= Kvernufoss =

Waterfall in Iceland

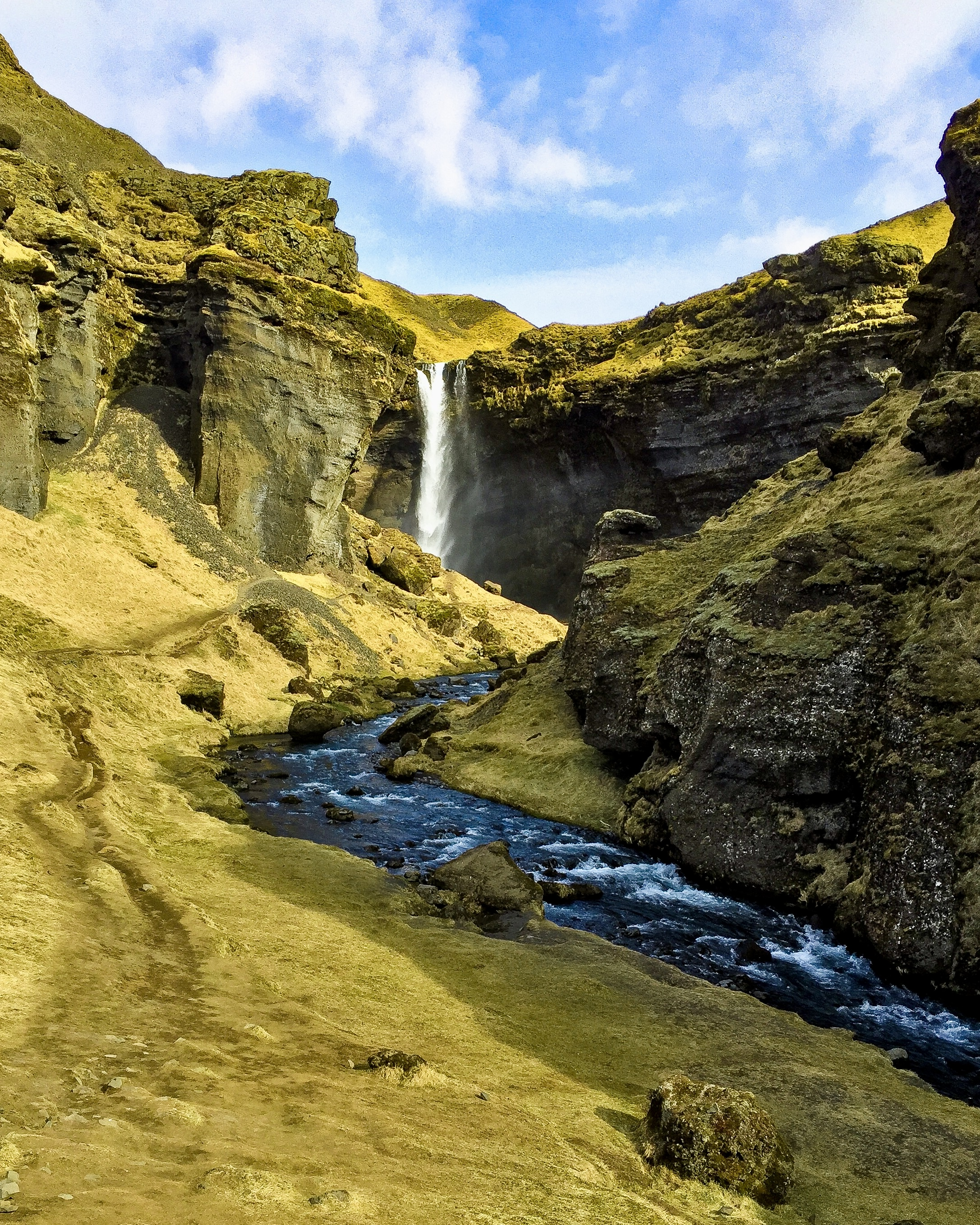

- Location within Iceland
- Location: Skógar, Iceland
- Coordinates: 63°31′44.3712″N 19°28′49.0692″W
- Total height: 40 m (130 ft)
- Number of drops: 1
- Watercourse: Kvernuhólsá

Kvernufoss (Icelandic pronunciation: [ˈkʰvɛ(r)tnʏˌfɔsː]) is a waterfall on the Skógá River in the south of Iceland.

== Geography ==
The waterfall is situated above a deeply recessed black basalt shelf in the Kvernugil canyon along the course of the Kvernuhólsá river, which originates from the meltwater of the Eyjafjallajökull glacier. If the area is free of snow it is possible to walk behind the waterfall and obtain a view down the Kvernugil canyon into which the river falls.

Due to the amount of spray the waterfall consistently produces, a single or double rainbow is normally visible on sunny days.

As with nearby Skógafoss the cliff from which the water falls once overlooked the ocean. The retreat of the ice at the end of the last ice age allowed the post-glacial rebound of the terrain and the consequent retreat of the shoreline.

== Access ==
The Kvernufoss waterfall is located near the village of Skógar and the gorge of the waterfall can be seen from the Hringvegur, the loop road that circles the whole of Iceland. It can be reached by walking less than a kilometre from the car park of the Skógar Museum along a path up the canyon.

== Gallery ==
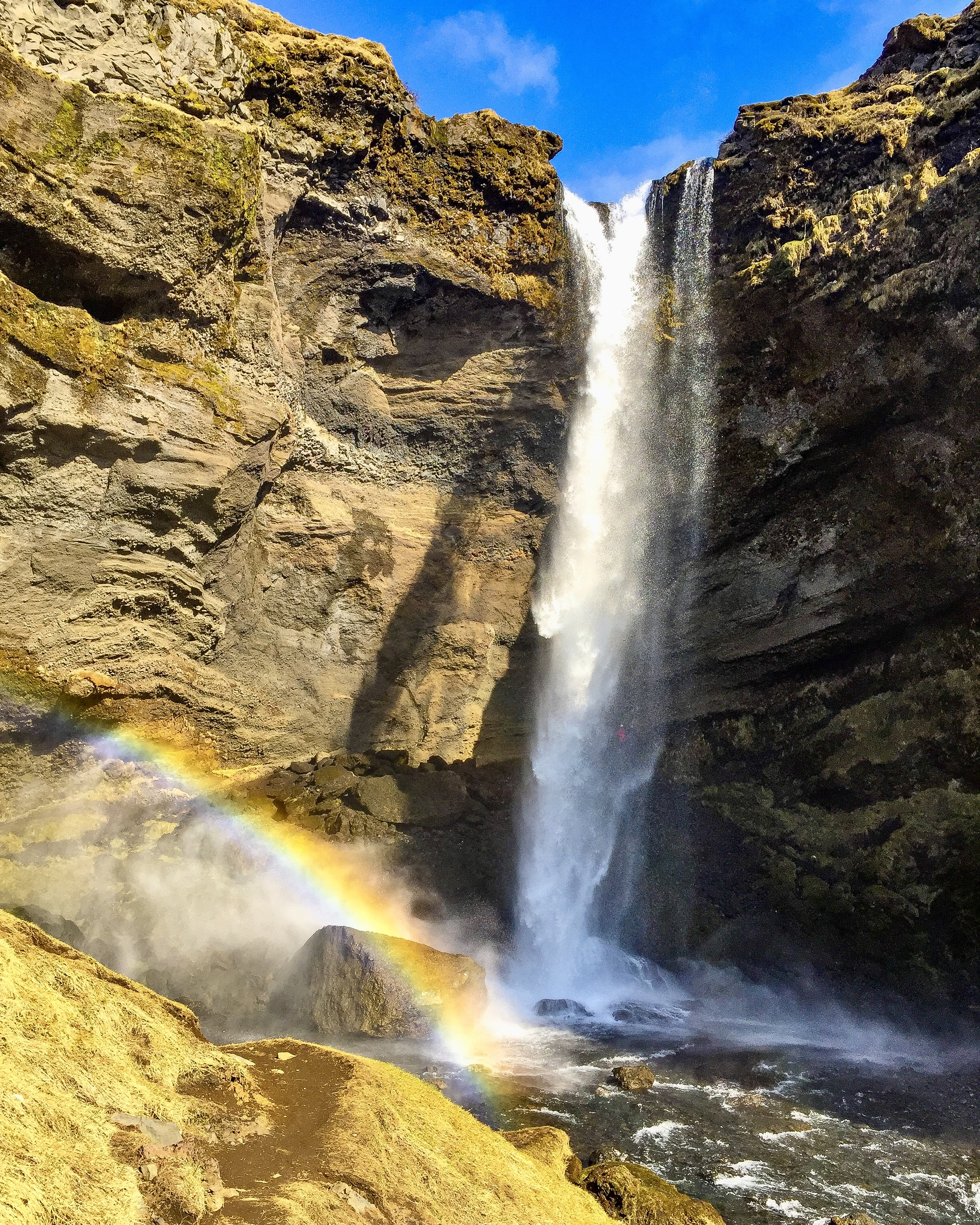
Kvernufoss waterfall with rainbow

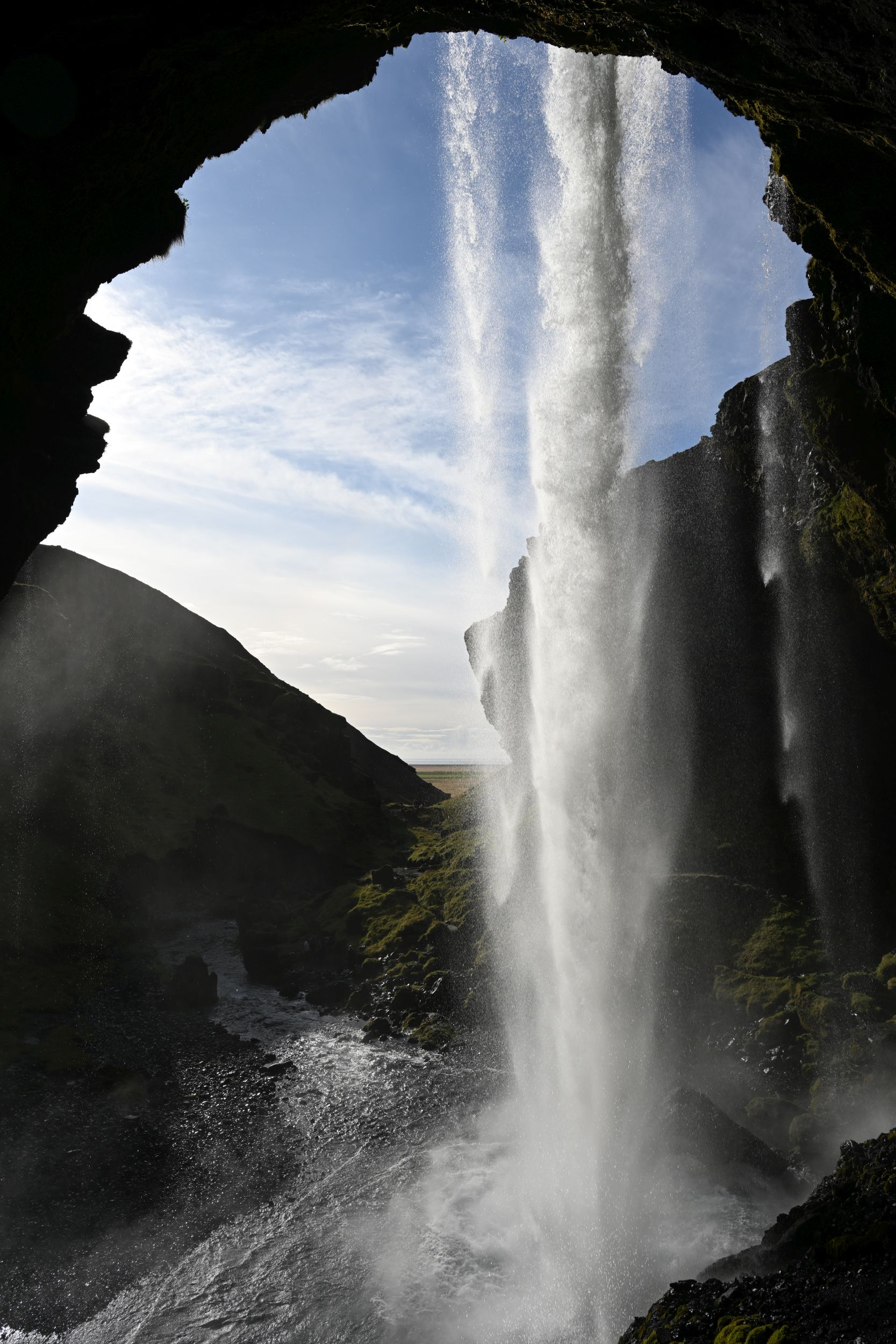
View from behind the waterfall

== See also ==
- Waterfalls of Iceland
- List of waterfalls
