= Rauðilækur =

- Hamlet
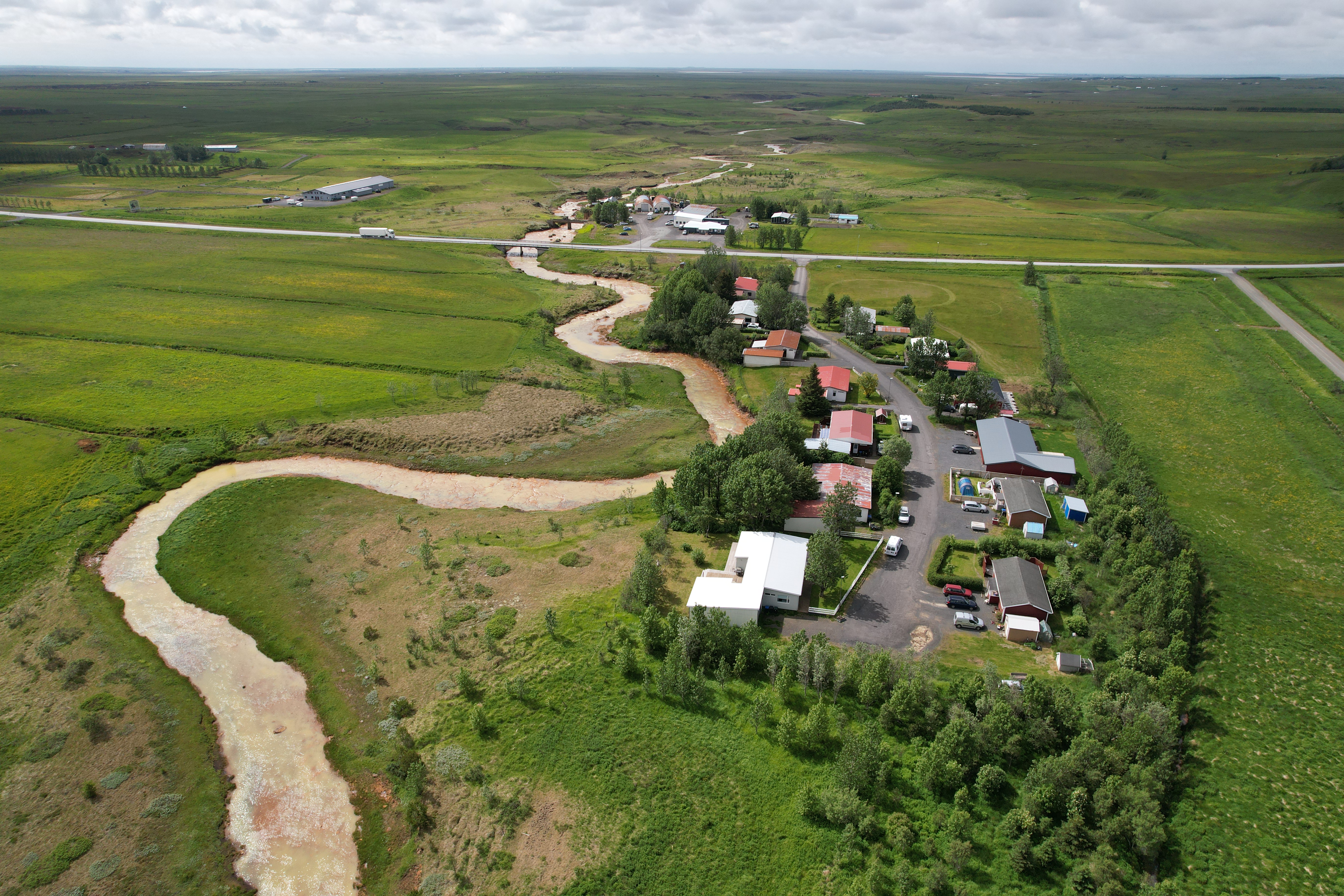
- Rauðilækur from above

- Location in Iceland
- Coordinates: 63°50′51″N 20°26′06″W
- Country: Iceland
- Constituency: South Constituency
- Region: Suðurland
- Municipality: Rangárþing ytra
- Established: 1902

Population (2011)
  - Total: 43
- Time zone: UTC+0 (GMT)

Rauðilækur (Icelandic pronunciation: [ˈrœyːðɪˌlaiːkʏr̥], or Syðri-Rauðalækur [ˈsɪðrɪ-ˌrœyːðaˌlaiːkʏr̥]) is a small village, more a hamlet, just beside the small town of Hella in southern Iceland. Established in 1902, the village is named after the stream of the same name that flows on the east side of the hamlet. In 2011 it had a population of 43.

== Geography and climate ==
The hamlet and the river are located about 90 kilometres (56 mi) southeast of Reykjavík, in the southern region and coastline area, which is characterized by peninsulas, coves, straits, and islands. Temperatures very rarely drop below −15 °C (5 °F) during the winter. This is because the Icelandic coastal weather in winter is moderated by the warm waters of the Gulf Stream. The climate is subpolar oceanic (Koppen: Cfc). Its coastal location, it is about 20 kilometres (12 mi) far from the North Atlantic Ocean, does make it prone to wind, and gales are common in winter. Summers are cool, with temperatures fluctuating between 10 and 15 °C (50 and 59 °F), sometimes exceeding 20 °C (68 °F).
