= Ungmennafélagið Hekla =

- Founded: 26 July 1908; 116 years ago
- Arena: Helluvöllur (football); Hella (basketball)
- Location: Hella, Iceland
- Team colors: Blue, White
- President: Ástþór Jón Ragnheiðarson

Ungmennafélagið Hekla (Icelandic pronunciation: [ˈuŋkˌmɛnːaˌfjɛːˌlaijɪð ˈhɛhkla], lit. 'Hekla Youth Club' (Note: Ungmennafélagið is the definite form of Ungmennafélag, meaning "the youth club".)) is a multi-sports club in Hella, Iceland. It fields departments in basketball, gymnastics, taekwondo and volleyball.

== History ==
The club was founded on 26 July 1908.

== Basketball ==
=== Seasons ===
Results of league and cup competitions by season
Season	Division	P	W	L	PTS	F	A	Pos	Playoffs	Icelandic Cup
Season	League								Playoffs	Icelandic Cup
2009-2010	2. deild Group C	16	3	13	6	993	1279	5th	N/A	R1
2010-2011	2. deild Group B	16	3	13	6	979	1230	8th	N/A	R1
2011-2012	2. deild Group A	16	7	9	14	1257	1315	6th	N/A	N/A
2012-2013	2. deild Group B	14	7	7	14	1007	1065	4th	R1	N/A
2013-2014	2. deild Group B	12	0	12	0	599	929	7th	N/A	N/A
2014-2015	2. deild Group A	14	7	7	14	1106	1087	4th	R1	N/A
