= Skógar =

- Village/Town
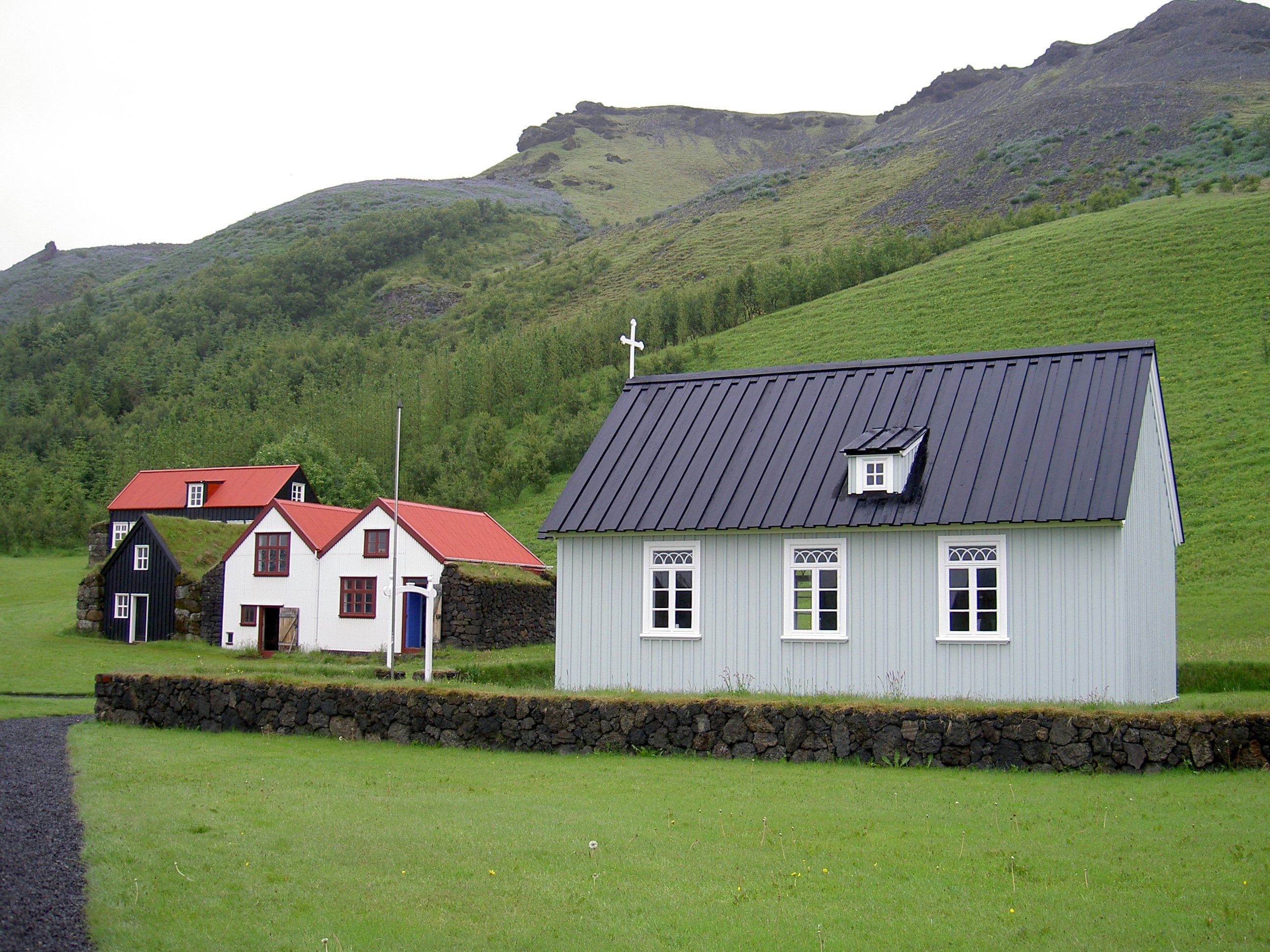
- Church of the museum at Skógar, behind it the mountain range Eyjafjöll

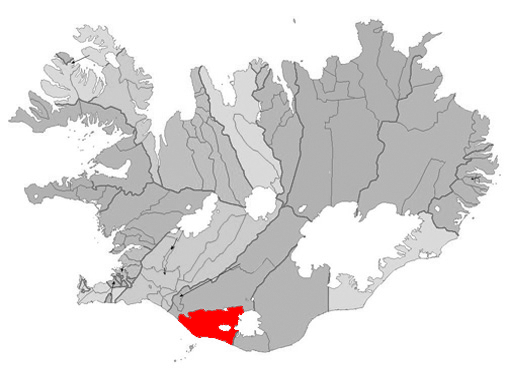
- Location of the Municipality of Rangárþing eystra

- Location of Skógar in Iceland
- Coordinates: 63°31′N 19°30′W
- Country: Iceland
- Constituency: South Constituency
- Region: Southern Region
- Municipality: Rangárþing eystra

Population
  - Total: 25
- Time zone: UTC+0 (GMT)

Skógar museum

Skógar (pronounced [ˈskouː(ɣ)ar̥]), literally the woods, is a small Icelandic village with a population of roughly 25 located at the south of the Eyjafjallajökull glacier, in the municipality of Rangárþing eystra.

The area is known for its waterfall, Skógafoss, on the Skógá [ˈskouː(ɣ)ˌauː] river, which springs from 60 metres at the top of an eroded cliff. At Skógar is a folk museum (Skógasafn [ˈskouː(ɣ)aˌsapn̥]), as well as a museum on transport in Iceland.

Not far from Skógar is the Kvernufoss [ˈkʰvɛ(r)tnʏˌfɔsː] fall. Further upstream on the Skógá river there are a number of other falls. While climbing in the small forest behind the old school, some ruins of old farms can be seen.

This settlement was severely affected by the eruption of the Eyjafjallajökull volcano in 2010.

== Gallery ==
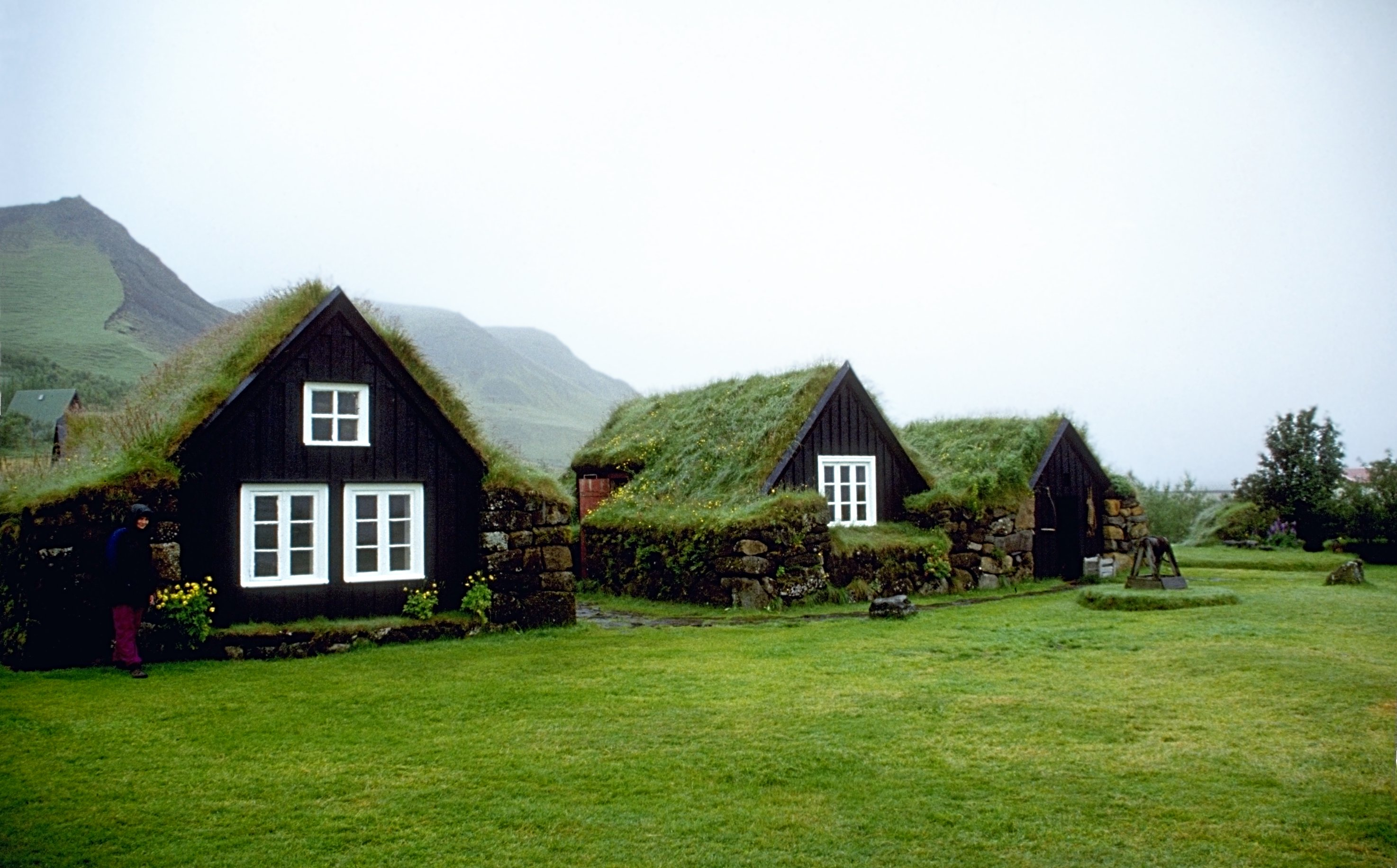
Museum of Skógar

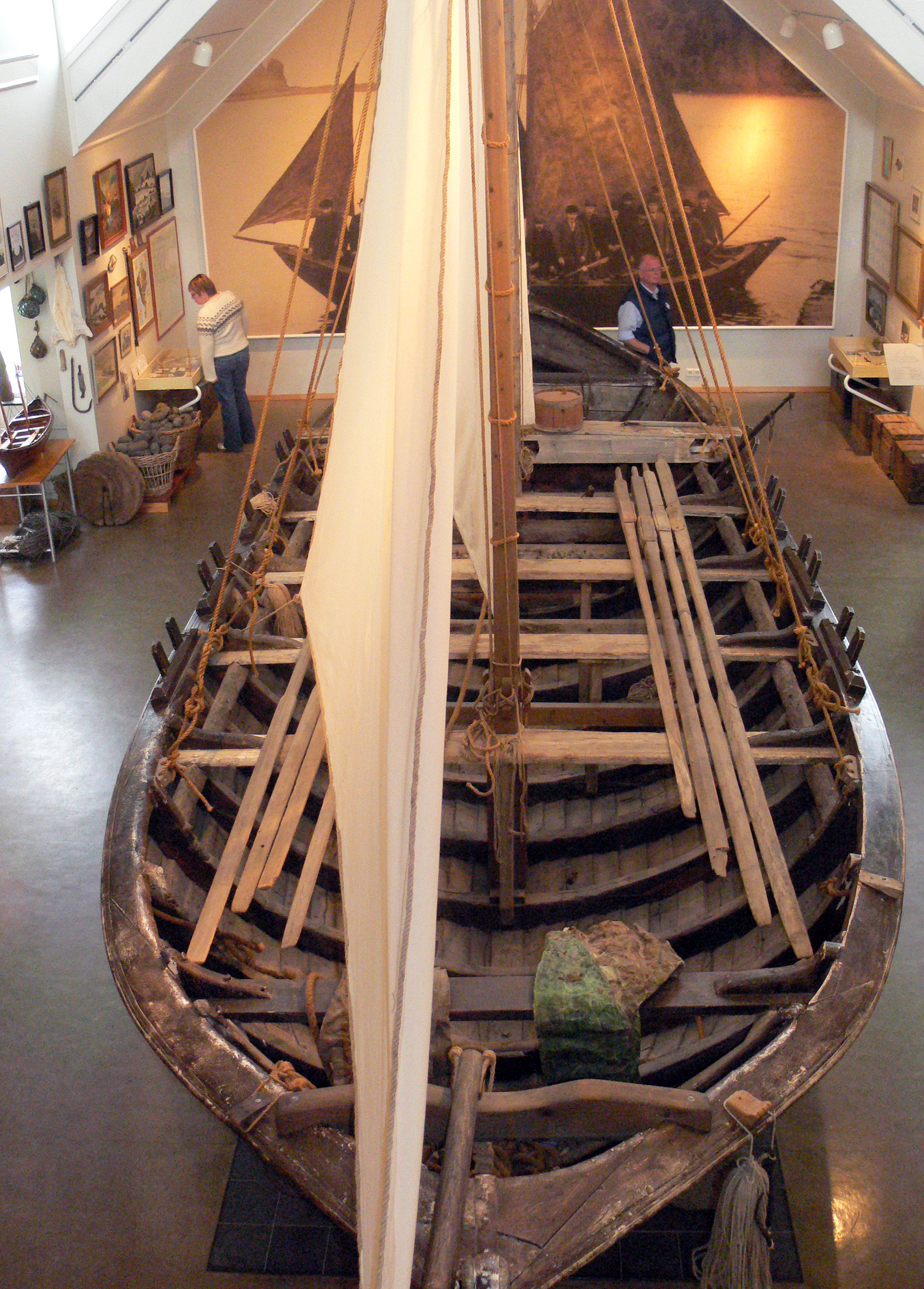
Pétursey, ferry boat at the museum

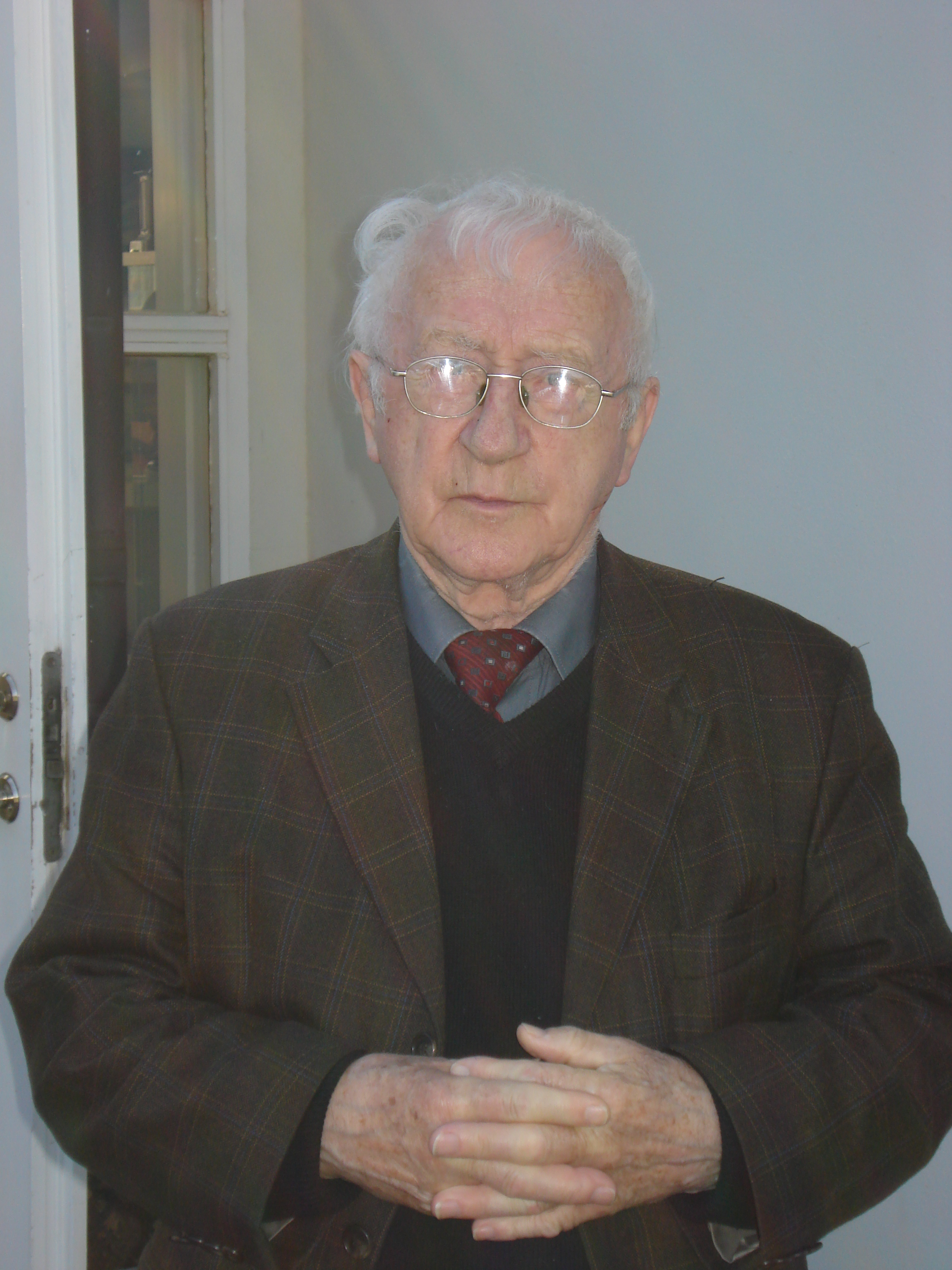
Þórður Tómasson (1921–2022), founder of the museum

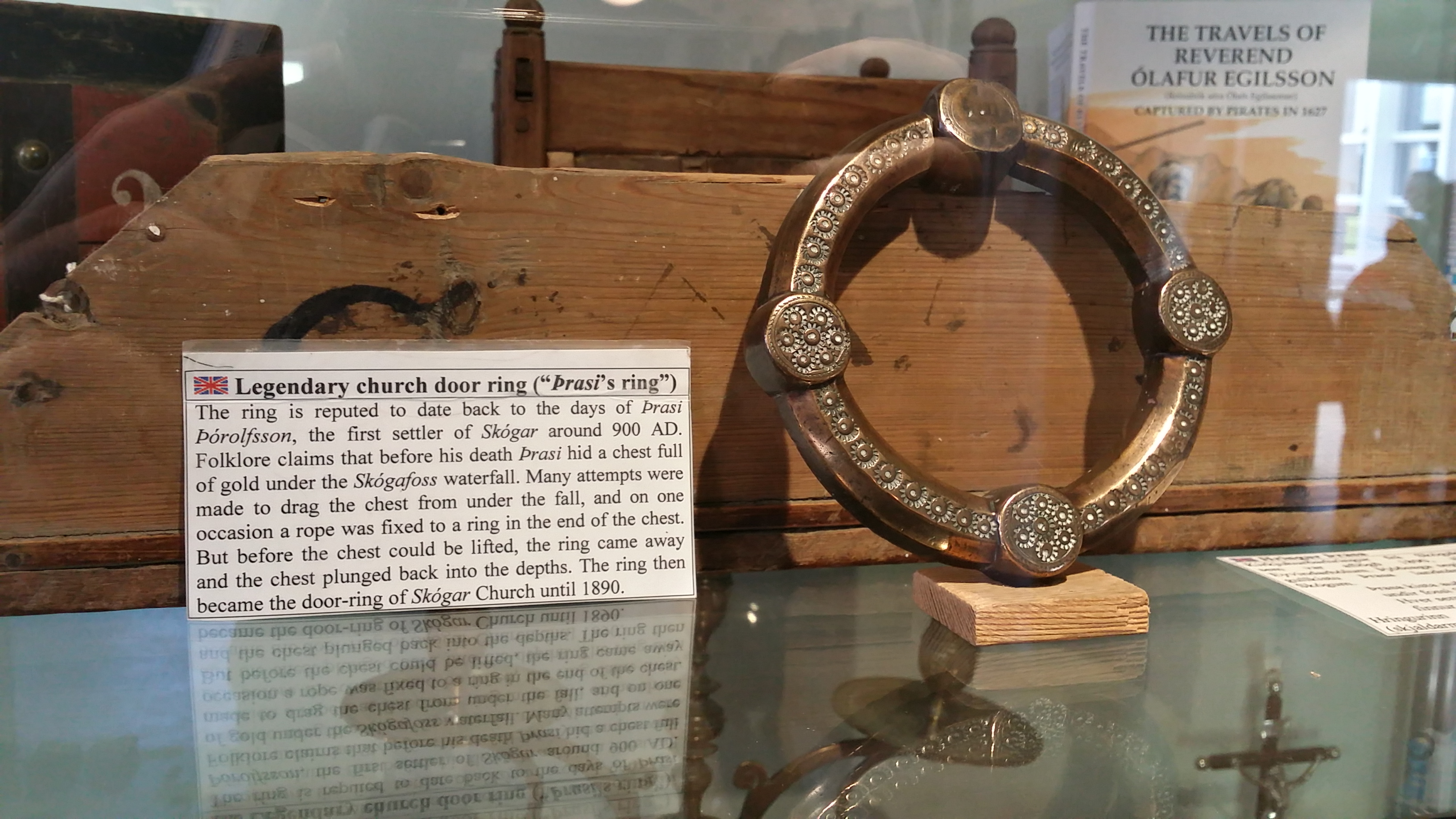
Þrasi's ring

== See also ==
- List of settlements in Iceland
- Waterfalls of Iceland
