= Skarð, Iceland =

Small farm and a church parish in southwestern Iceland

Skarðskirkja Skarðskirkja á landi
- Farm
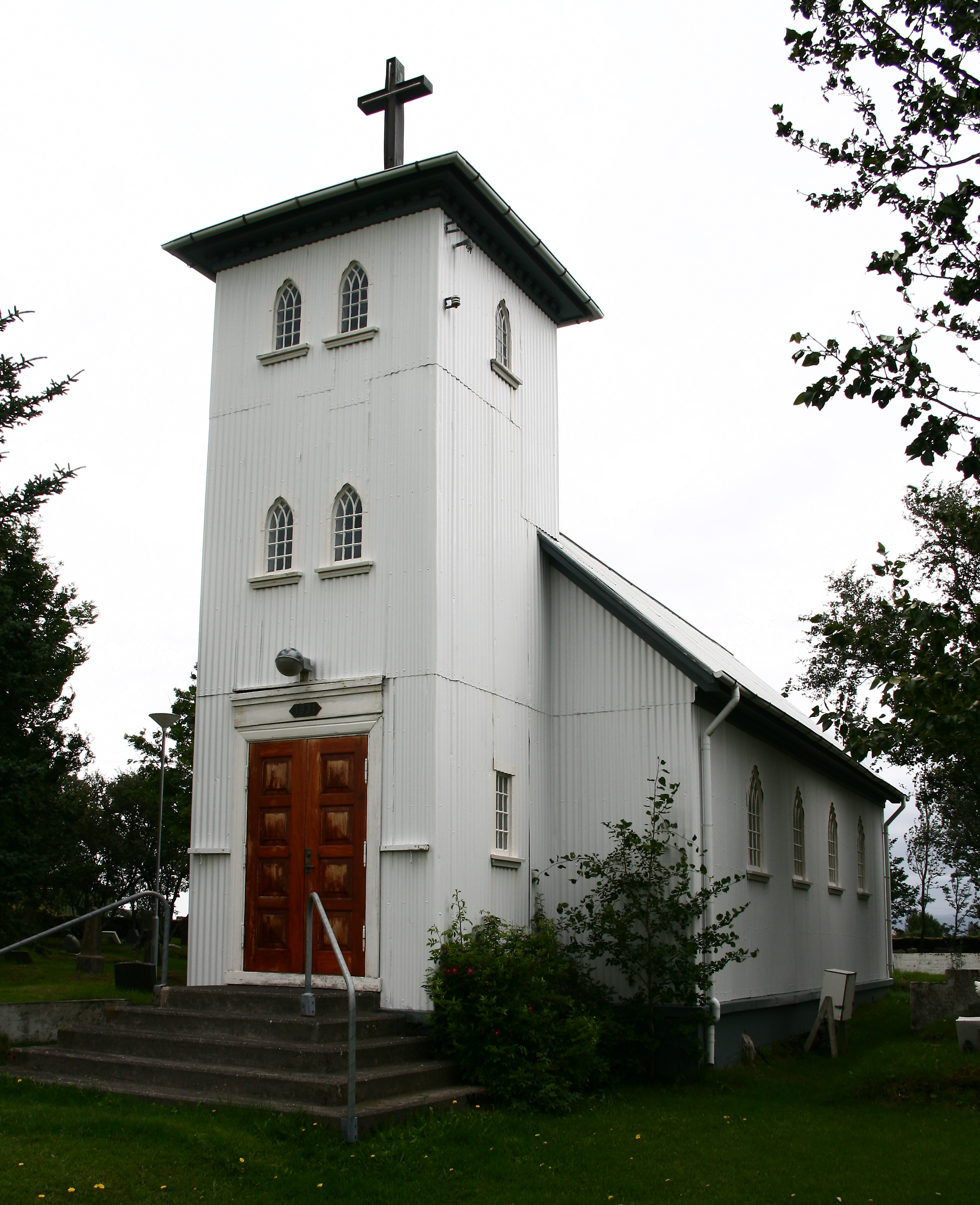
- Skarðskirkja, the Skarð church

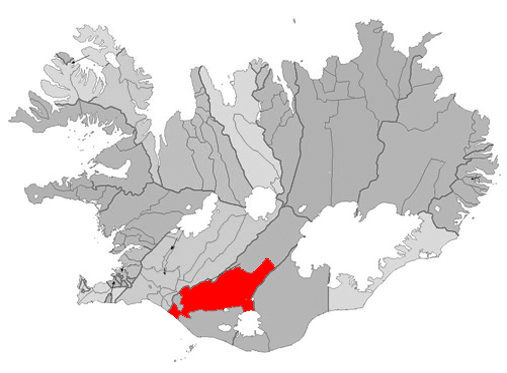
- Location of the Municipality of Rangárþing ytra
- Coordinates: 63°45′N 20°37′W
- Country: Iceland
- Constituency: South Constituency
- Region: Southern Region
- Municipality: Rangárþing ytra
- Time zone: UTC+0 (GMT)

Skarð (Icelandic pronunciation: [ˈskarθ]) is a small farm and a church parish in southwestern Iceland in the Rangárþing ytra municipality (before 2002: Landsveit), Rangárvallasýsla county, and Southern Region, along road 26 (Landvegur), northwest of Hekla.

The current Skarð church was built in 1931. The parish shares a priest with four other church parishes (Árbæjar, Haga, Kálfholts, Marteinstungu) under the name Fellsmúlaprestakall. This parish and church is called "Skarðskirkja á Landi" to disambiguate from other places named Skarð. The original Roman Catholic church was devoted to archangel Michael.
