= Skógafoss =

Waterfall in Iceland

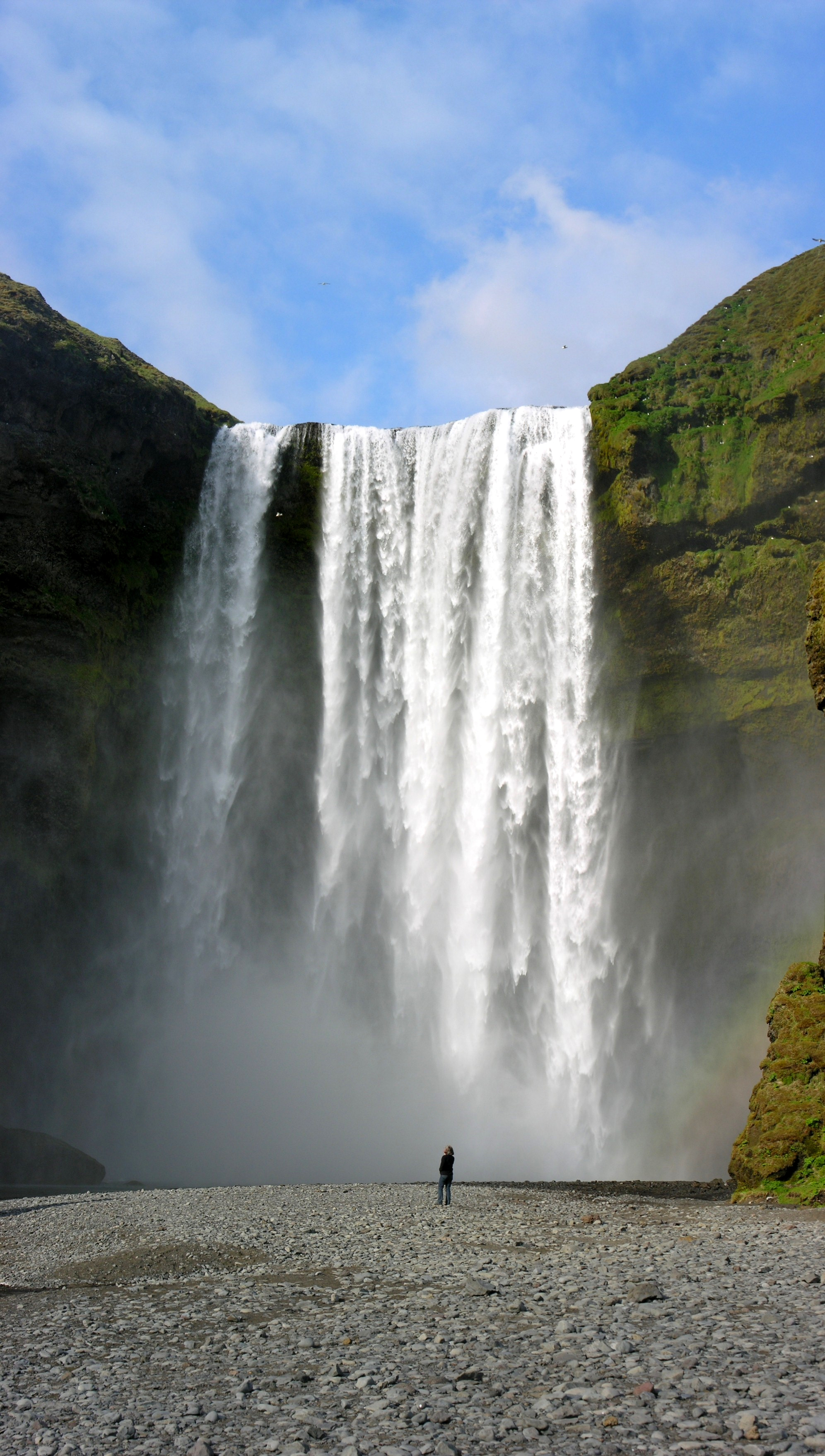

- Location within Iceland
- Location: Skógar, Iceland
- Coordinates: 63°31′55.6″N 19°30′40.1″W
- Type: Cataract
- Total height: 60 m (200 ft)
- Number of drops: 1
- Total width: 25 m (82 ft)
- Watercourse: Skógá

Skógafoss (pronounced [ˈskouː(ɣ)aˌfɔsː]) is a waterfall on the Skógá River in the south of Iceland at the cliff marking the former coastline. After the coastline had receded (it is now at a distance of about 5 kilometres (3 miles) from Skógar), the former sea cliffs remained, parallel to the coast over hundreds of kilometres, creating together with some mountains a clear border between the coastal lowlands and the Highlands of Iceland.

== Geography ==
Skógafoss is one of the biggest waterfalls in the country, with a width of 25 metres (82 feet) and a drop of 60 m (200 ft). Due to the amount of spray the waterfall consistently produces, a single or double rainbow is normally visible on sunny days. Visitors can be drenched if they go too near the waterfall, again due to the spray. According to legend, the first Viking settler in the area, Þrasi Þórólfsson, buried a treasure in a cave behind the waterfall. The legend continues that locals found the chest years later, but were only able to grasp the ring on the side of the chest before it disappeared again. The ring was allegedly given to the local church. The old church door ring is now in the Skógar museum.

At the eastern side of the waterfall, a hiking and trekking trail leads up to the pass Fimmvörðuháls between the glaciers Eyjafjallajökull and Mýrdalsjökull. It goes down to Þórsmörk on the other side and continues as the Laugavegur trail to Landmannalaugar. A 527-step staircase leads up the slope to the top of the waterfall.

== In popular culture ==
In 2012, Skógafoss was the setting for Sólstafir's music video "Fjara", a song from their album Svartir Sandar. That same year, the opening task during the second episode of the twelfth season of the Dutch reality television series Wie is de Mol? took place at the waterfall.

The waterfall was a location for the filming of the 2013 film releases Thor: The Dark World and The Secret Life of Walter Mitty.

The 2015 Bollywood movie Dilwale features the waterfall was one of the locations of the song "Gerua". That same year, the Justin Bieber music video for "I'll Show You", featuring glacial lagoons and rivers in South Iceland, includes Skógafoss.

The second episode of season 5 of the series Vikings, which aired in 2017, shows the character Floki (based on Hrafna-Flóki Vilgerðarson) coming upon Skógafoss when he discovers Iceland.

The final season of the series Game of Thrones, which aired in 2019, shows Daenerys Targaryen and Jon Snow flying to this waterfall on her dragons and kissing in front of it.

== Gallery ==
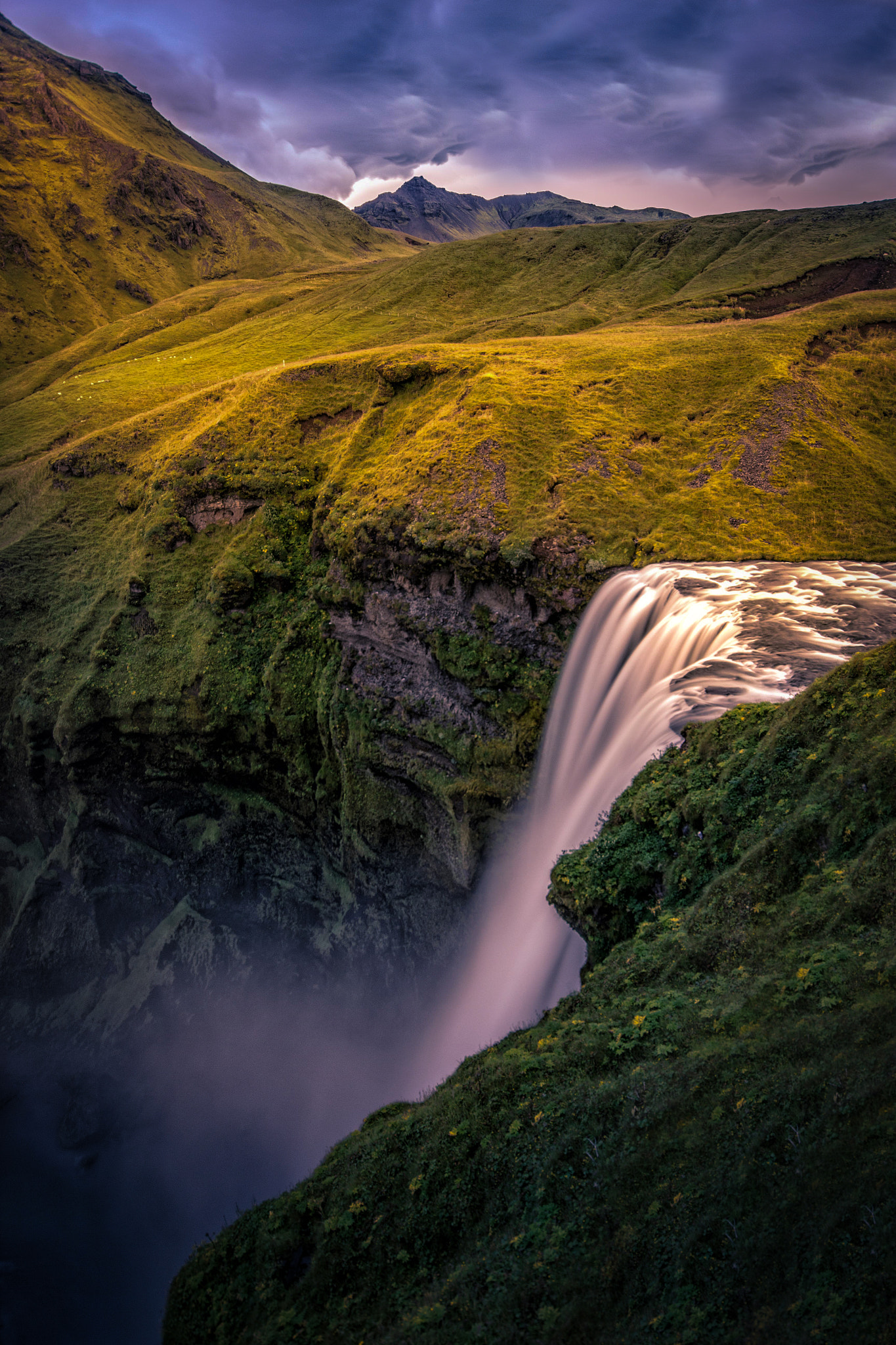

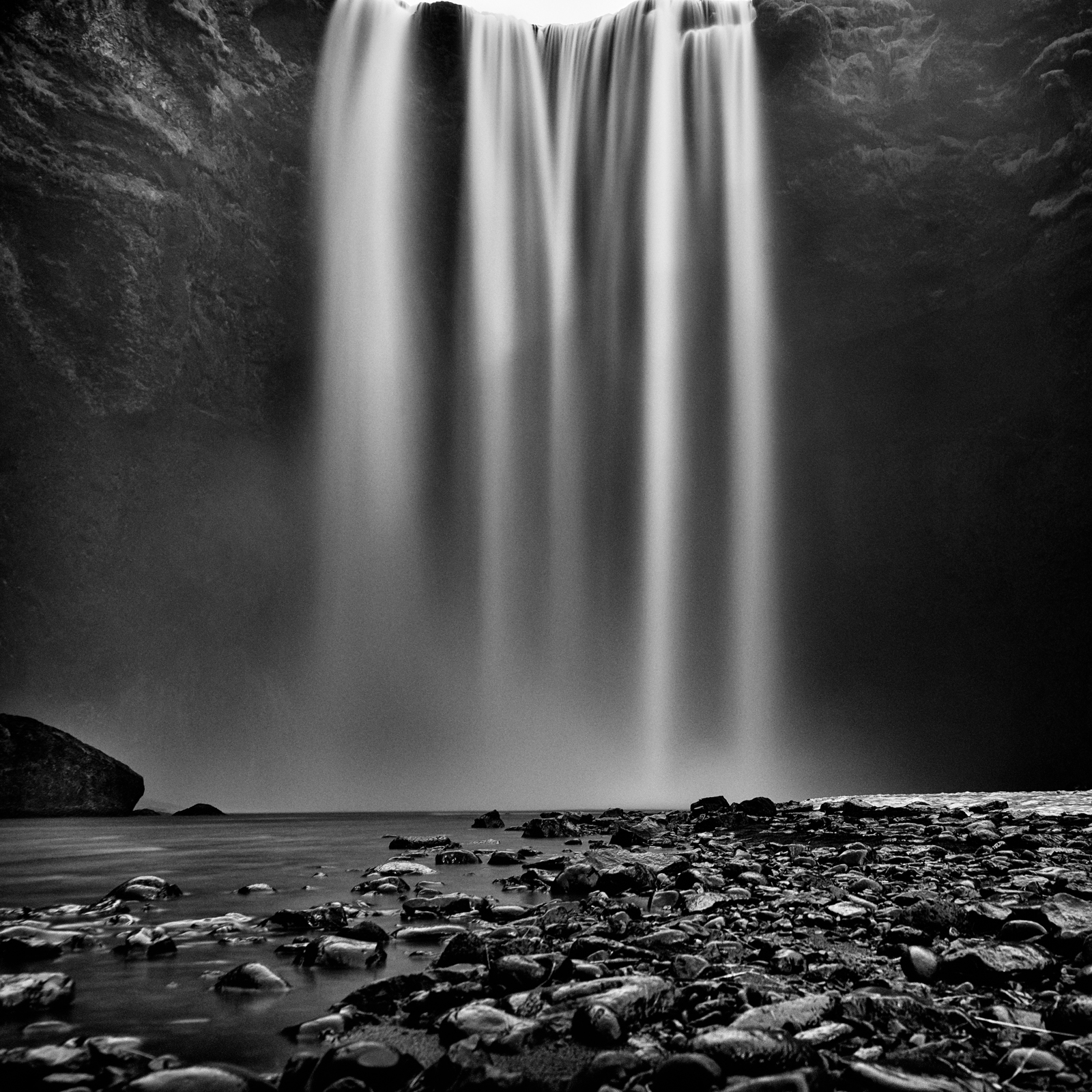
Long-exposure photo of the waterfall

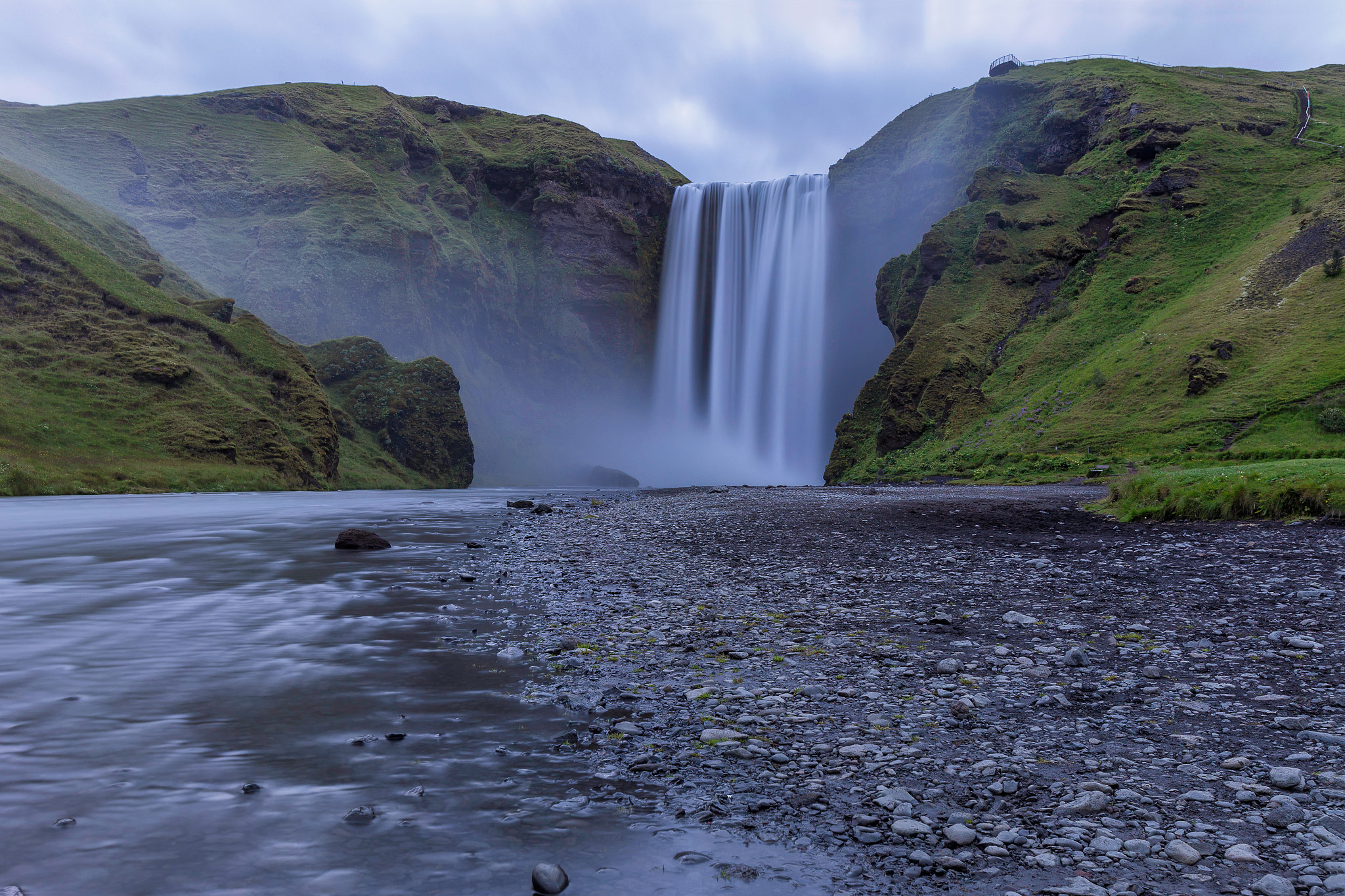
Skogafoss at night

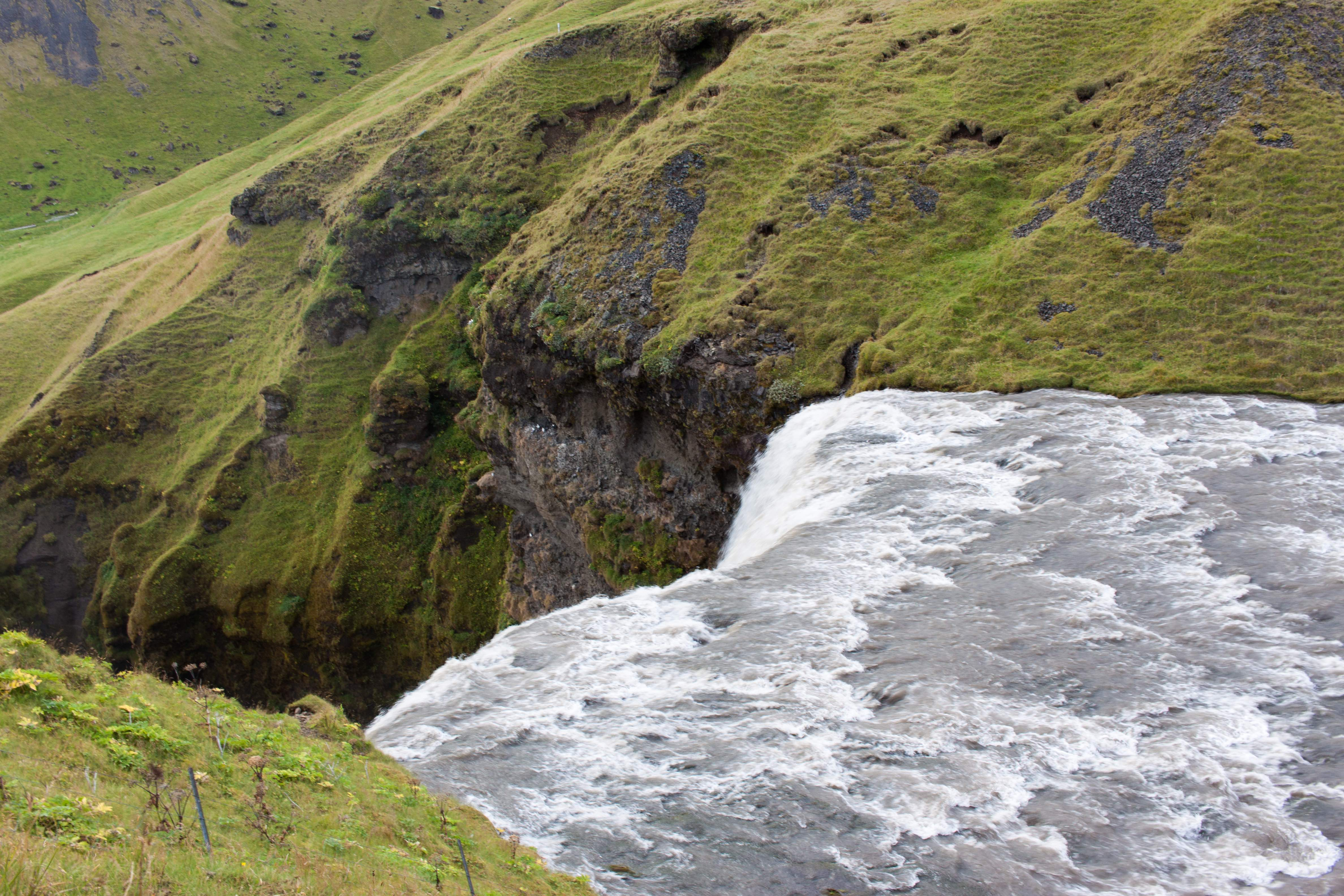
Photo taken from the top of the stairs

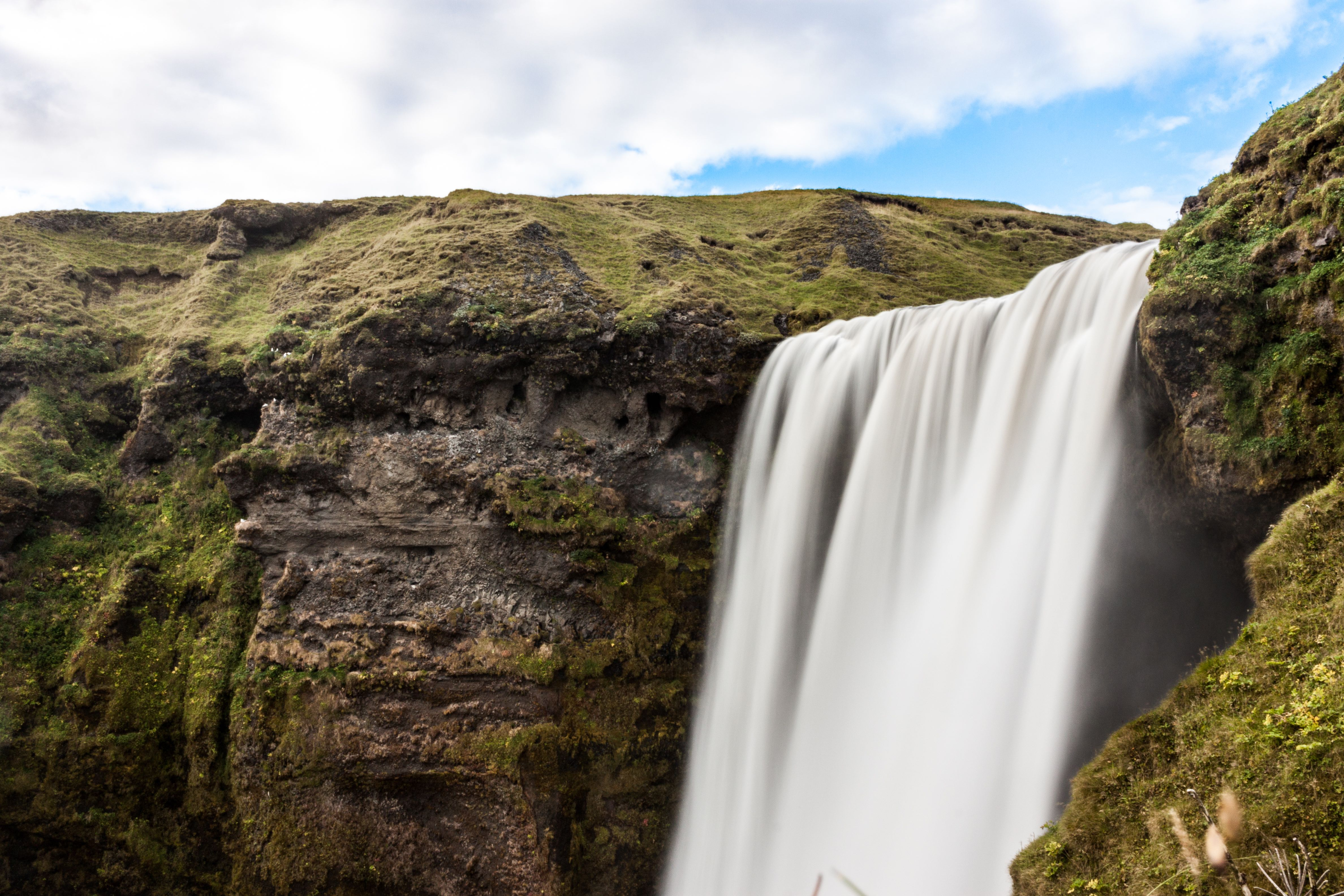
Long-exposure photo of the waterfall, taken from the stairs

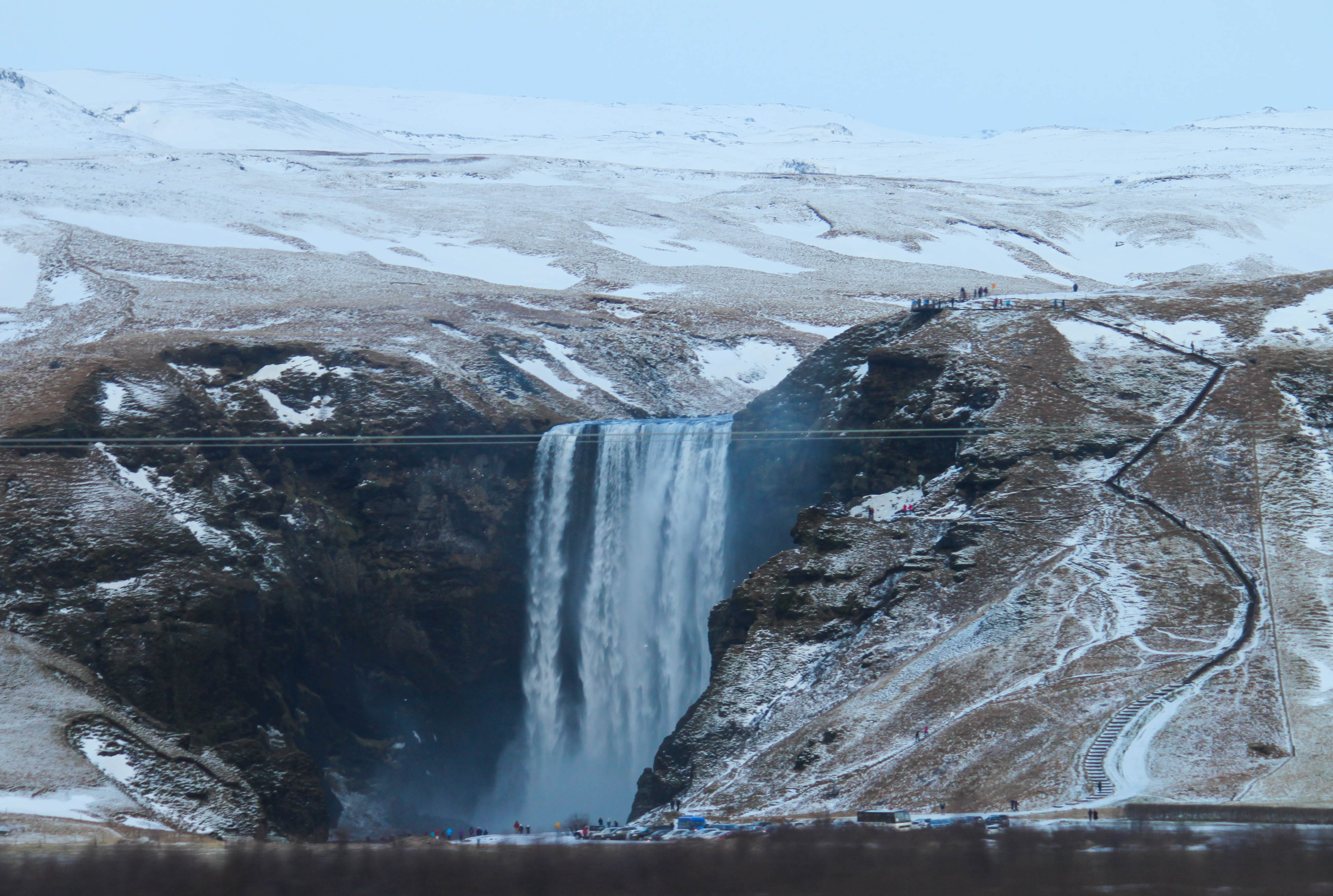
Skogáfoss in winter, aerial view

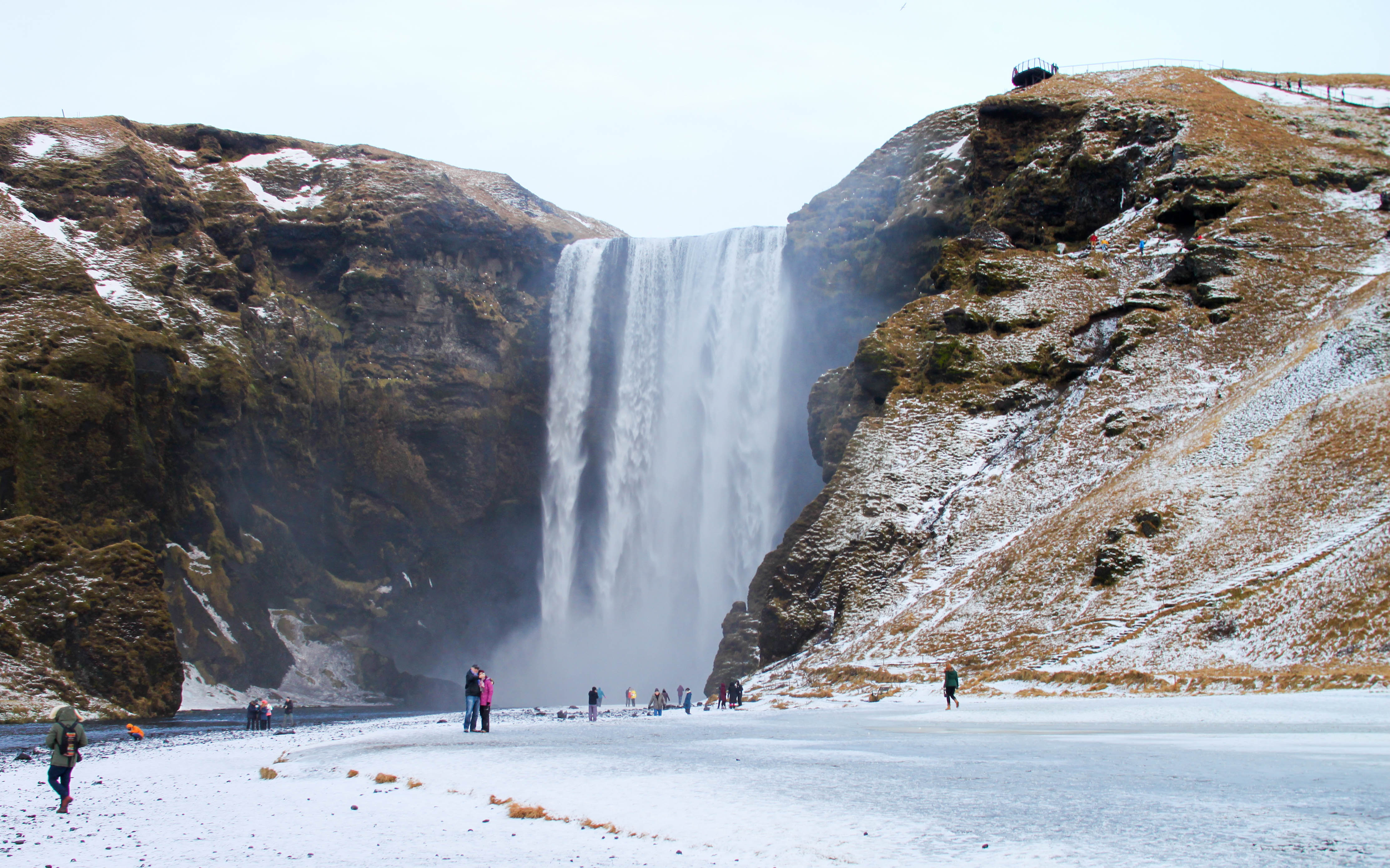
Skogáfoss in winter

== See also ==
- Waterfalls of Iceland
- List of waterfalls
