= Sláturfélag Suðurlands =

Icelandic farmer co-operative

Sláturfélag Suðurlands svf
- Company type: Public
- Traded as: Nasdaq Iceland: SFS B
- Industry: Abattoir & Meat processing
- Founded: 1907
- Headquarters: Reykjavík, Iceland
- Key people: Steinþór Skúlason (CEO); Hallfreður Vilhjálmsson (Chairman)
- Number of employees: 98
- Website: www.ss.is

Sláturfélag Suðurlands (Icelandic pronunciation: [ˈstlauːtʏrˌfjɛːˌlaːɣ ˈsʏːðʏrˌlan(t)s], transl. Southern Region Slaughterhouse; abbreviated as SS) is a producers' co-operative owned by farmers in the southern and western parts of Iceland. It was established in Þjórsárbrú on 28 January 1907 by 565 founders. One of the best known products of the company are SS sausages.

The main founder was Thomas Tomasson, who had learned to slaughter in Copenhagen and was the first qualified butcher in Iceland. Sláturfélagið built a modern slaughterhouse and Human Reykjavík creation. In 1913, the company built a freezing plant with a cooling system for meat storage and was the first meat-freezing storage with hardware in the country.
