= Ytri-Rangá =

Coordinates: 63°46′39″N 20°28′44″W

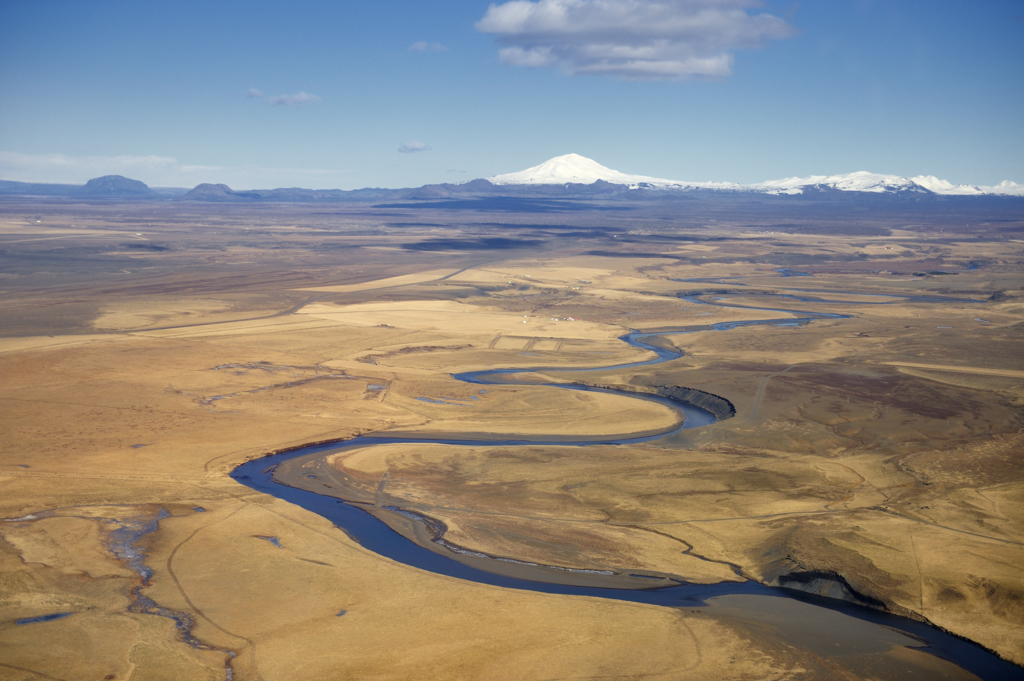
- Etymology: "Outer" Rangá

Location
- Country: Iceland

Physical characteristics
- Source: North of Hekla
- Mouth: Hólsá (after joining with Þverá)
  - location: 10 km (6.2 mi) south of Hella
- Length: 55 km (34 mi)

Basin features
- Tributaries
  - left: Eystri-Rangá (East Rangá) (affluent of Þverá, which then forms Holsá)

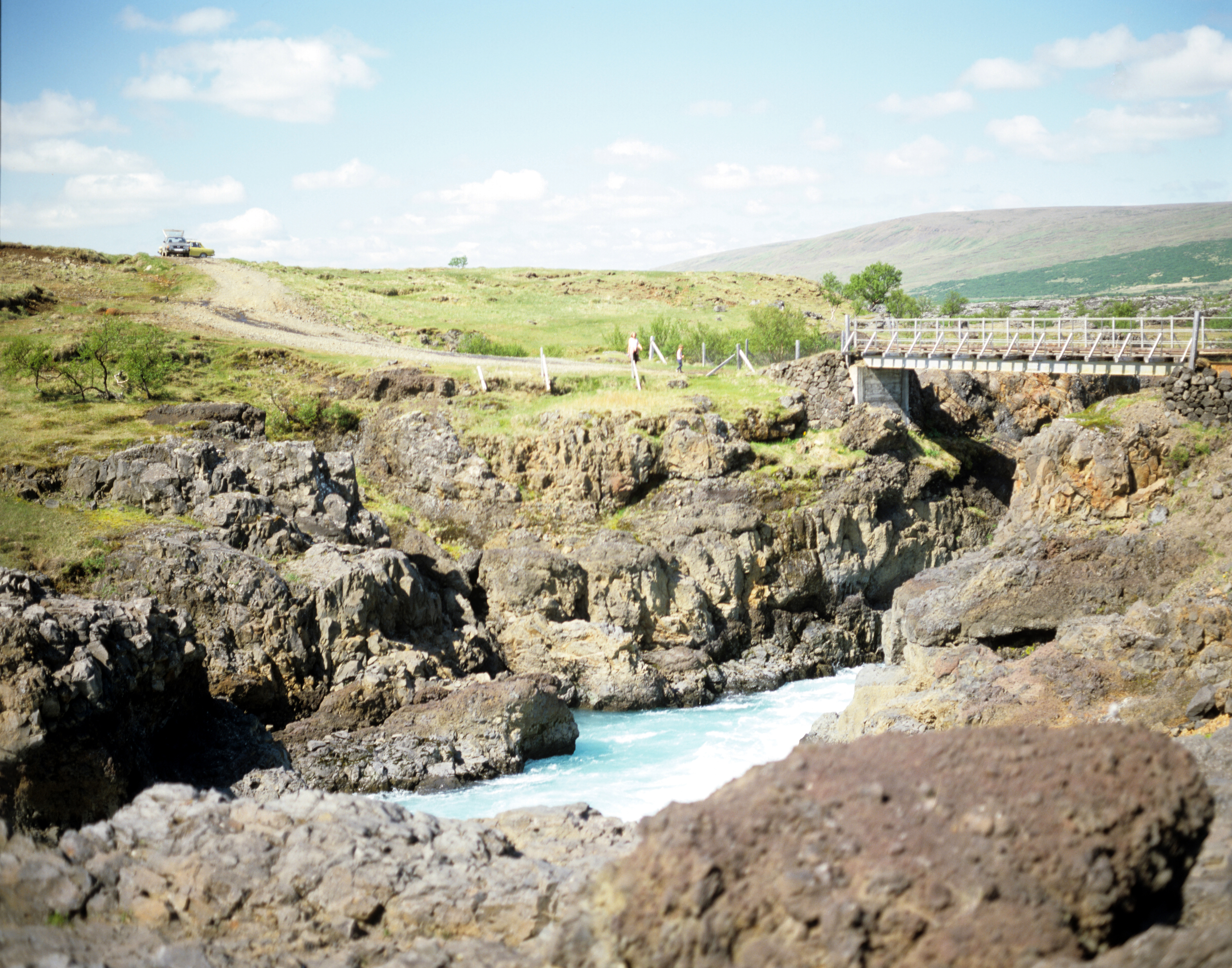

Ytri-Rangá (Icelandic pronunciation: [ˈɪːtrɪ ˈrauŋkˌauː]) is a river in Iceland popular for salmon fishing. It is over 55 kilometres (34 mi) long, rising north of Hekla, passing to the west of Hella before, 10 kilometres (6.2 mi) further south, joining with the river Þverá to become the Hólsá. "Rangá" would translate as Curvy River (i.e. ring), but since there are two with such name they are distinguished as Ytri, "outer", the one to the west and Eystri or East Rangá, the two eventually join to form Hólsá.
