= Rangárþing ytra =

Coordinates: 63°50′N 20°24′W

- Municipality
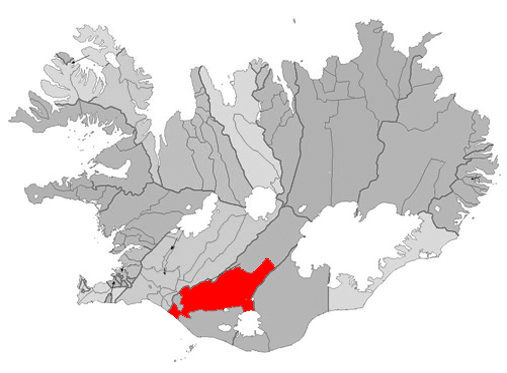
- Location of Rangárþing ytra

- Location within Iceland
- Country: Iceland
- Region: Southern Region
- Constituency: South Constituency
- Established: 9 June 2002

Government
  - Manager: Jón G. Valgeirsson

Area
  - Total: 3,194 km^{2} (1,233 sq mi)

Population (2024)
  - Total: 1,867
  - Density: 0.5845/km^{2} (1.514/sq mi)
- Postal code(s): 850, 851
- Municipal number: 8614
- Website: ry.is

Rangárþing ytra (Icelandic pronunciation: [ˈrauŋkˌaurˌθiŋk ˈɪːtra], lit. 'Outer Rangárþing') is a municipality located in southern Iceland. Its major industries include tourism and agriculture. Rangárþing ytra was created 9 June 2002, when three municipalities, Rangárvallahreppur, Holta- og Landsveit and Djúpárhreppur were merged. The largest settlement is Hella.

== Villages ==
- Þykkvibær
- Rauðilækur

== See also ==
- Skarð
- Oddi
- Keldur
