= Rangárþing eystra =

Coordinates: 63.750°N 20.234°W

- Municipality
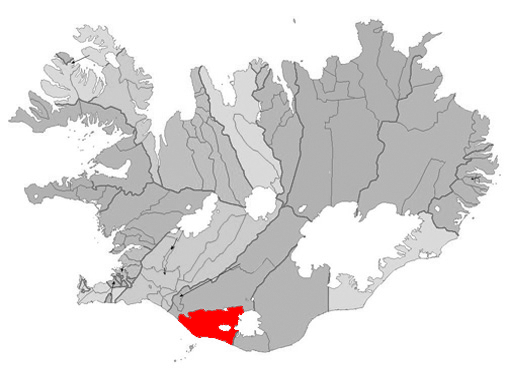
- Location of Rangárþing eystra

- Location within Iceland
- Country: Iceland
- Region: Southern Region
- Constituency: South Constituency

Government
  - Mayor: Anton Kári Halldórsson

Area
  - Total: 1,832 km^{2} (707 sq mi)

Population (2024)
  - Total: 2,007
  - Density: 1.096/km^{2} (2.837/sq mi)
- Postal code(s): 860, 861
- Municipal number: 8613
- Website: hvolsvollur.is www.visithvolsvollur.is

Rangárþing eystra (Icelandic pronunciation: [ˈrauŋkˌaurˌθiŋk ˌeistra]) is a municipality located in southern Iceland in the Southern Region, between Eystri Rangá in the west and Jökulsá á Sólheimasandi in the east. The largest settlements are Skógar and Hvolsvöllur.
