= Þykkvibær =

- Village
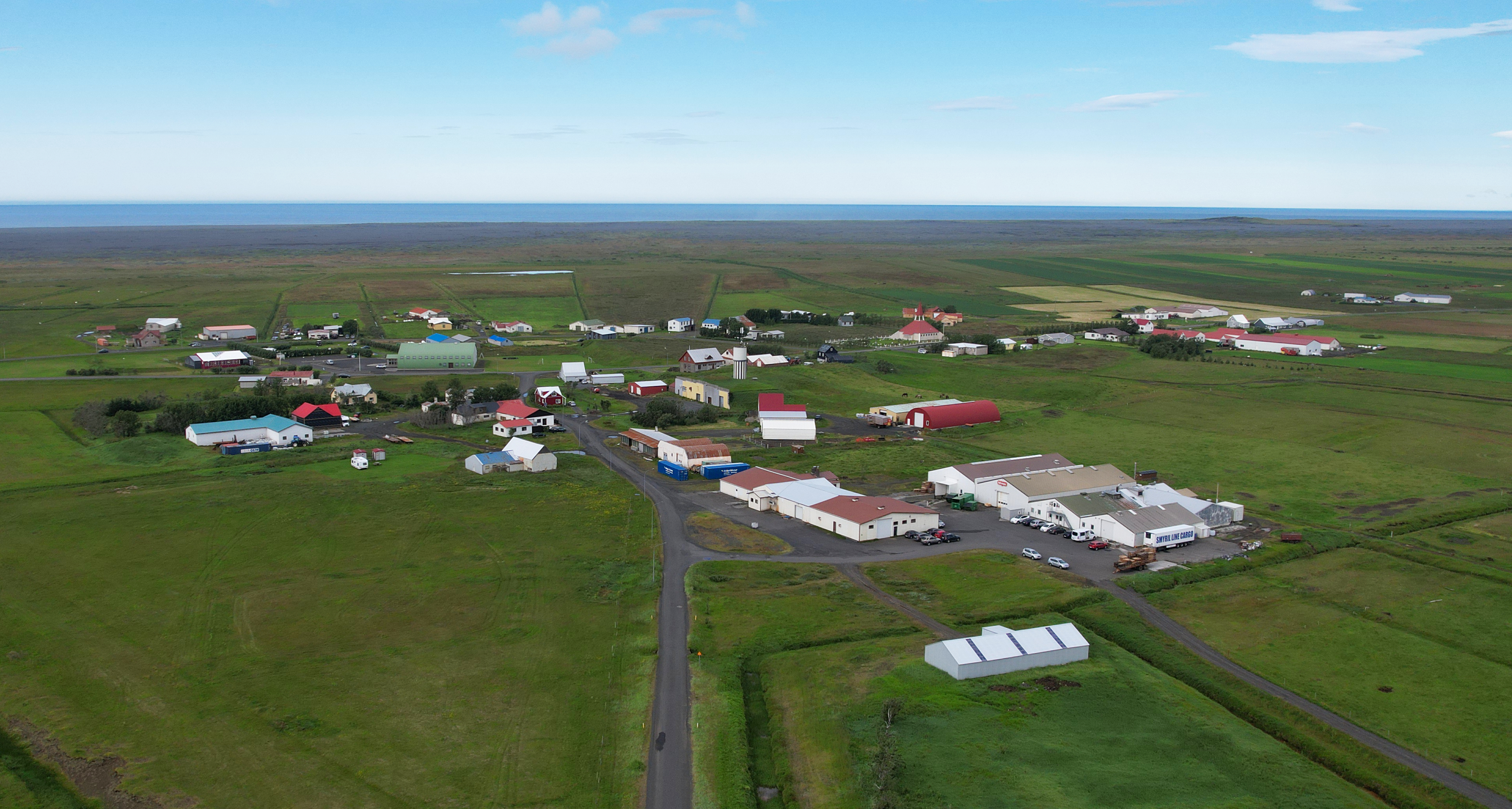

- Location within Iceland
- Coordinates: 63.743115°N 20.6087°W
- Country: Iceland
- Region: Suðurland
- Municipality: Rangárþing ytra

Area
  - Total: 1.18 km^{2} (0.46 sq mi)
  - Land: 1.18 km^{2} (0.46 sq mi)
  - Water: 0 km^{2} (0 sq mi) 0%

Dimensions
  - Length: 1.86 km (1.16 mi)
  - Width: 0.67 km (0.42 mi)
- Time zone: UTC+0 (WET)
  - Summer (DST): UTC+0 (Not observed)

Þykkvibær (Icelandic pronunciation: [ˈθɪhkvɪˌpaiːr̥]), also known as Þykkvabær [ˈθɪhkva-], is a village in South Iceland, part of the municipality of Rangárþing ytra. It is the oldest rural village in Iceland. As of January 2021 there are 79 inhabitants.

== History ==
The settlement is first mentioned in church records in 1270 (756 years ago), and was the first rural village in Iceland, and for more than 900 years the only one. Located in the estuary between the rivers Þjórsá and Hólsá, it was subject to encroachment and to being cut off by floodwaters and had a fluctuating, partly seasonal population. Fishing was traditionally a significant part of the village economy, drawing crew from inland to work on the boats, but stopped from 1896 to 1916 after the fleet was destroyed, and ended permanently after March 1955, when a boat with 11 men aboard capsized on emerging from the channel into the open sea; no one was killed, although six were trapped under the overturned boat and had to be rescued.

In 1923, the mayor, Sigurður Ólafsson í Habæ, organised the village's entire labour force to build a 340-metre (1,120 ft) dam, the Djúpósstífla, diverting the Þverá river to flow into the Hólmsá; the task required 4,000 man-days. The resulting drainage made the land above the village easier to cultivate, and Þykkvibær is now known in Iceland for growing potatoes, sold under the Þykkvabæjar brand name since 1981.

Administratively, the village was formerly the southern part of the hreppur of Ásahreppur, formed in 1892; in 1936 this was subdivided, with Þykkvibær making up Djúpárhreppur. In 2002, it was consolidated into Rangárþing ytra.

Many ships have run aground in the shallows off Þykkvibær, including Kamp in 1900, Sæborg in 1908, a French ship in 1912, Heimaey in 1981, and the German cargo ship Víkartindur in 1996.
