= Hella, Iceland =

Hella
- Town
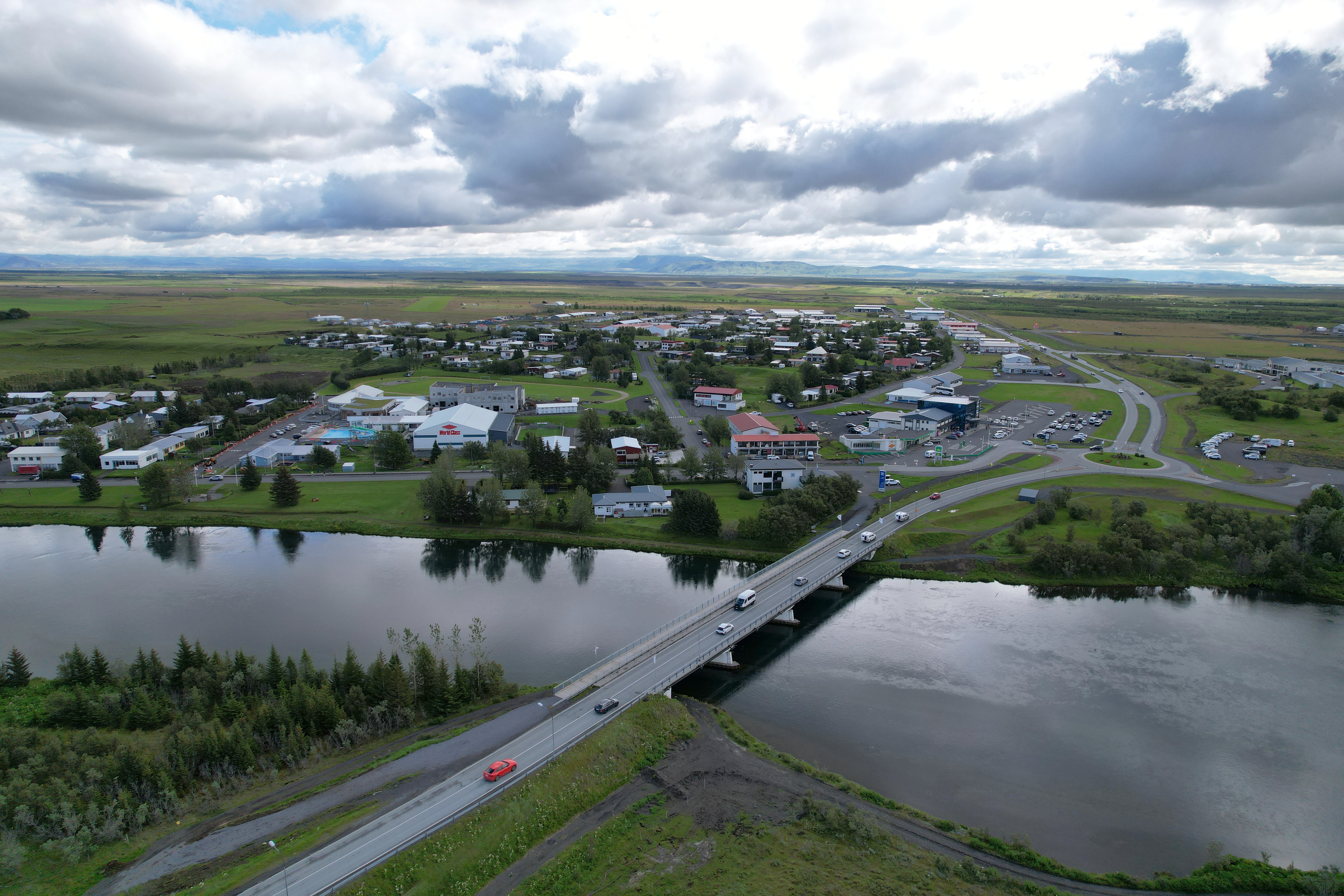
- Hella in 2024

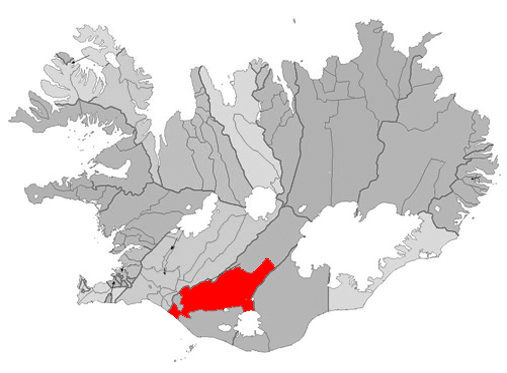
- Location of the Municipality of Rangárþing ytra

- Location in Iceland
- Coordinates: 63°50′N 20°24′W
- Country: Iceland
- Constituency: South Constituency
- Region: Southern Region
- Municipality: Rangárþing ytra

Population (2019)
  - Total: 865
- Time zone: UTC+0 (GMT)
- Post Code: 850, 851

Hella (Icelandic pronunciation: [ˈhɛtla]) is a small town in southern Iceland on the shores of the river Ytri-Rangá and has, as of 2021, 942 inhabitants.

Hella is situated 94 kilometres (58 mi) east of Reykjavík on the Hringvegur (Route 1) between Selfoss and Hvolsvöllur.

== Overview ==
The name of the town comes from caves near the river. It is said that Irish monks lived there in the times of first settlement. There are small industries as well as shops. As in other regions of the country, tourism is a growing sector. The volcano Hekla is roughly 40km (25 mi) away and Eyjafjallajökull is about 45km (28 mi), in the summer buses have daily schedules to Landmannalaugar and Þórsmörk from Hella

Hella was founded 1927 by Þorsteinn Björnsson who built a general store and a slaughterhouse by the old bridge crossing Ytri-Rangá (roughly 500 meters north of the current bridge) in the land of Helluvað. It was meant to service the surrounding countryside and was well received.

The village of Hella celebrated its founder by placing a memorial by the Rangá River in 1977, marking 50 years since its founding.

== Climate ==
Hella has a subarctic climate (Köppen: Dfc; Trewartha: Eolo), with daily mean temperatures rising above 10 °C (50 °F) only in July and August.

Climate data for Hella, 1961–1990 normals, extremes 1958–2005
Month	Jan	Feb	Mar	Apr	May	Jun	Jul	Aug	Sep	Oct	Nov	Dec	Year
Record high °C (°F)	11.3 (52.3)	10.4 (50.7)	16.8 (62.2)	15.8 (60.4)	21.4 (70.5)	24.3 (75.7)	25.2 (77.4)	27.0 (80.6)	20.2 (68.4)	16.7 (62.1)	12.7 (54.9)	12.5 (54.5)	27.0 (80.6)
Mean daily maximum °C (°F)	1.1 (34.0)	2.1 (35.8)	3.0 (37.4)	6.1 (43.0)	10.2 (50.4)	12.7 (54.9)	14.5 (58.1)	13.9 (57.0)	10.7 (51.3)	6.7 (44.1)	2.6 (36.7)	1.3 (34.3)	7.1 (44.8)
Daily mean °C (°F)	−1.8 (28.8)	−0.7 (30.7)	−0.4 (31.3)	2.7 (36.9)	6.5 (43.7)	9.4 (48.9)	10.9 (51.6)	10.3 (50.5)	6.9 (44.4)	3.4 (38.1)	−0.2 (31.6)	−1.6 (29.1)	3.8 (38.8)
Mean daily minimum °C (°F)	−4.5 (23.9)	−3.3 (26.1)	−3.0 (26.6)	−0.3 (31.5)	2.8 (37.0)	6.1 (43.0)	7.6 (45.7)	6.8 (44.2)	3.7 (38.7)	0.9 (33.6)	−2.8 (27.0)	−4.5 (23.9)	0.8 (33.4)
Record low °C (°F)	−21.8 (−7.2)	−22.3 (−8.1)	−20.1 (−4.2)	−17.8 (0.0)	−8.2 (17.2)	−2.9 (26.8)	0.0 (32.0)	−3.1 (26.4)	−8.2 (17.2)	−17.8 (0.0)	−16.3 (2.7)	−20.2 (−4.4)	−22.3 (−8.1)
Average precipitation mm (inches)	107.1 (4.22)	105.8 (4.17)	104.0 (4.09)	86.7 (3.41)	71.6 (2.82)	89.3 (3.52)	82.6 (3.25)	110.5 (4.35)	104.1 (4.10)	121.8 (4.80)	108.1 (4.26)	114.2 (4.50)	1,205.8 (47.47)
Source: Icelandic Meteorological Office

== See also ==
- List of cities in Iceland
- Rangárþing ytra
- Hekla
- Þykkvibær
