= LXXX Corps =

LXXX Corps or 80th Corps may refer to:

- LXXX Army Corps, Wehrmacht, Germany
- 80th (Liverpool Press Guard) Lancashire Rifle Volunteer Corps, United Kingdom

== See also ==
- List of military corps by number
- 80th Brigade (disambiguation)
- 80th Division (disambiguation)
- 80th Regiment (disambiguation)
- 80th (disambiguation)
