= 80th =

80th is the ordinal form of the number 80. 80th or Eightieth may also refer to:

- A fraction, 1/80, equal to one of 80 equal parts

== Geography ==
- 80th meridian east, a line of longitude
- 80th meridian west, a line of longitude
- 80th parallel north, a circle of latitude
- 80th parallel south, a circle of latitude
- 80th Street (disambiguation)

== Military ==
- 80th Group Army, People's Republic of China
- 80th Brigade (disambiguation)
- 80th Division (disambiguation)
- 80th Regiment (disambiguation)
- 80th Squadron (disambiguation)

== Other ==
- 80th century
- 80th century BC

== See also ==
- 80 (disambiguation)
