= Iceland Defense Force =

Former military command of the United States Armed Forces (1951-2006)

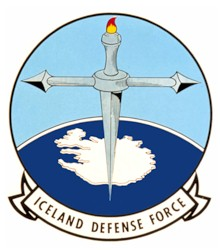
The emblem of the Iceland Defense Force

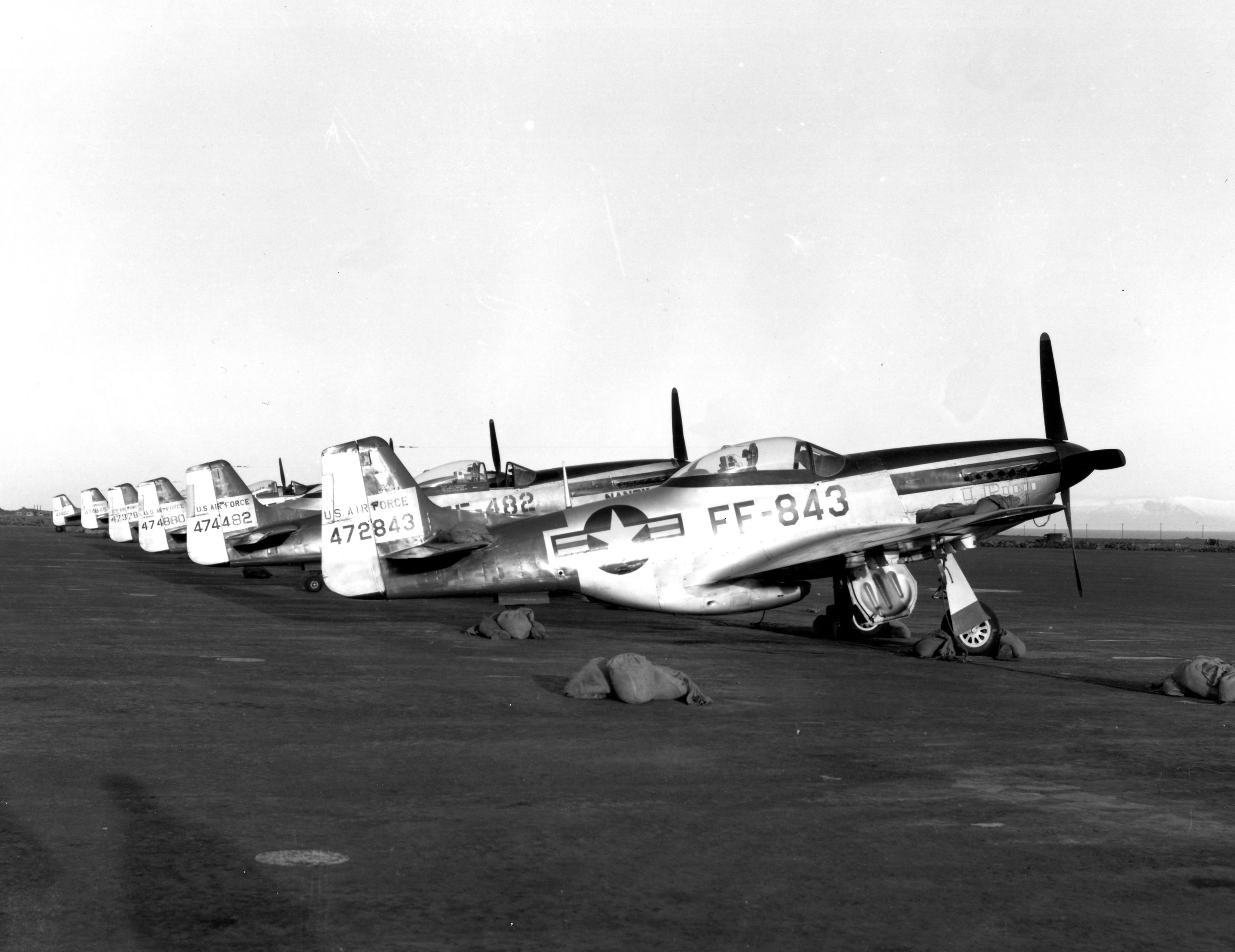
North American F-51D Mustangs of the 192nd Fighter-Bomber Squadron (Nevada Air National Guard) stationed at Keflavik, 1952–1953

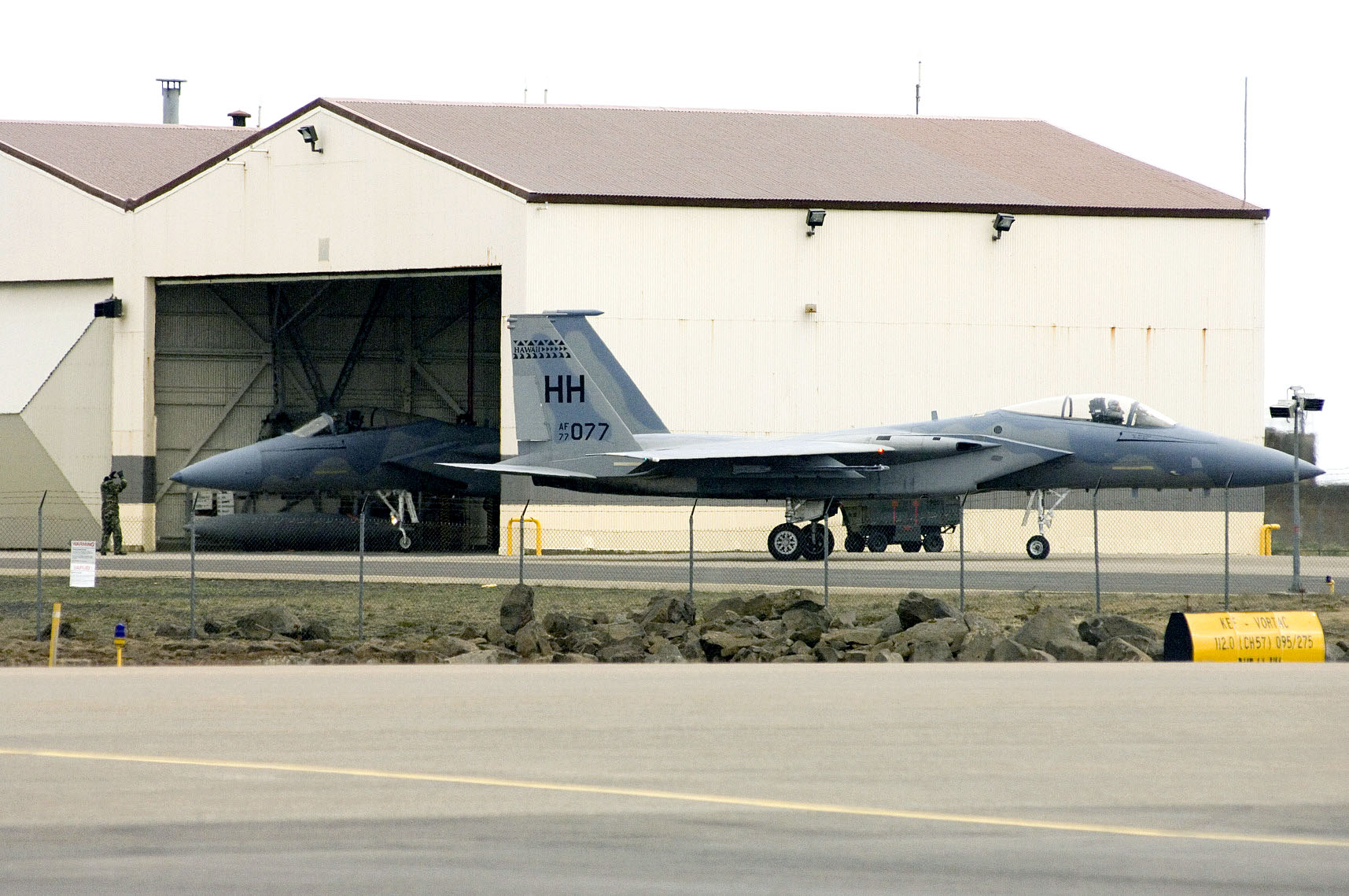
U.S. Air Force F-15 stationed at Keflavik

The Iceland Defense Force (Icelandic: Varnarlið Íslands; IDF) was a sub-unified command of the United States Department of Defense. It existed from 1951 to 2006. It came into existence when the United States agreed to provide for the defense of Iceland, which has only limited defense forces.

The IDF was composed of United States Navy, United States Marine Corps, and United States Air Force personnel as well as local Icelandic civilians. In the 1950s, there were United States Army field forces stationed in Iceland, and the first commander of the IDF was a U.S. Army brigadier general. By the 1980s the IDF only included a few U.S. Army and, in addition, some United States Coast Guard personnel.

== Organization ==
The IDF was formally headquartered at Naval Air Station Keflavik, though its base was actually at Miðnesheiði near Keflavík.

The initial personnel of the Iceland Defense Force "..arrived on 7 May 1951, commanded by an Army brigadier general responsible to the Supreme Allied Commander Atlantic, for NATO operations and to the Commander-in-Chief, Atlantic, for tactical operations and control." Brig. Gen. Edward J. McGaw was the first commander.

In 1955, the U.S. Navy's Barrier Force, Atlantic had been established in Argentia, Newfoundland, to fly early-warning missions using the WV-2 (EC-121 Warning Star) radar aircraft over the North Atlantic. These aircraft made frequent deployments to Keflavik. On July 1, 1961, Commander Barrier Force, Atlantic moved from Argentia to Keflavik. The duties of Commander, Iceland Defense Force were assumed by the rear admiral commanding Barrier Force Atlantic. By the 1980s, Commander, Iceland Defense Force was a U.S. Navy Rear Admiral with three other titles and roles: Commander, Iceland Sector ASW Group (CTG-84.1), Commander, Fleet Air Keflavik, and NATO Island Commander Iceland. Commander Fleet Air Keflavik (COMFAIRKEF) was the senior Navy command in Iceland, responsible for the operational readiness of Navy units assigned. The commander of Fleet Air Keflavik was the operational commander in charge of all Navy and anti-submarine warfare operations. Administratively, he reported to Commander, Naval Air Force U.S. Atlantic Fleet, located in Norfolk, Virginia.

The IDF remained a subordinate of United States Atlantic Command (LANTCOM) after 1951 for a long period. In 1999, LANTCOM was renamed and reorganized as United States Joint Forces Command. The IDF remained under U.S. Joint Forces Command from 1999 to 2002. From October 2002 until its disbandment, it was under the control of the United States European Command.

From 1951 to 1959, a secret ban was imposed by the Icelandic government on the stationing of black US troops in Iceland. This ban was disclosed in late 1959. The Icelandic government relented somewhat from this policy in 1961, when it declared that it "will not oppose the inclusion of three or four colored soldiers in the Defense Force, but hopes that they will be carefully selected". The number of black troops increased gradually throughout the 1960s, and all restrictions were most likely unofficially withdrawn in the 1970s or 1980s.

There were more than 25 different commands of various sizes attached to the Iceland Defense Force. Although staffing varied over the years, it was approximately 1350 U.S. military personnel (not including Reservists), 100 Department of Defense civilians, and 650 Icelanders, both civilians and firemen given military training manning the local Naval Firefighting team, as well as military members from Norway, Denmark, Canada, the Netherlands, and the United Kingdom worked on NAS Keflavik. A contingent of the United States Marine Corps was responsible for ground defense.

The U.S. Air Force component of the force was the 85th Group. The air forces stationed in Iceland included a rotational P-3 Orion patrol squadron deployed forward from the U.S. Navy's Patrol Wings Atlantic, and the F-15s of the 85th Group. Commander Dennis Corrigan, Fleet Air Keflavik's operations officer, commented to Jane's Defence Weekly in 1996 that "Keflavik is the only place where a US Navy flag officer has both P-3s and USAF F-15s working for him. ... We have developed a joint tactical doctrine: F-15s providing air superiority to allow the P-3 to do its job, whether its mining, anti-submarine warfare or something else." With the reduction in Patrol Wings Atlantic to ultimately seven squadrons by 1994, commitments at NAS Roosevelt Roads and Sigonella were reallocated, with Patrol Wings, Pacific taking up the Caribbean tasking to allow a full complement of P-3s in Sicily.

In the event of a major ground threat, the Army component, U.S. Army Iceland (ARICE), would have mobilized and become responsible for the ground defense of Iceland. ARICE consisted almost entirely of reserve components (from 1963 until 1994, the main formation was the Army Reserve's 187th Infantry Brigade) in the United States, and limited numbers of personnel participated in on-site training maneuvers. Logistical support was to be provided by the 167th Support Group (Corps), another Army Reserve unit. Neither the 187th Infantry Brigade nor the 167th Support Group were ever deployed to Iceland.

From 1970 to 2006, the Iceland Defense Force provided between 2% and 5% of Iceland's GDP.

== Exercises ==
Operation Nordic Shield II was held in the summer of 1992. As they did five years before, units of the 94th Army Reserve Command; principally the 187th Infantry Brigade (Separate), the 167th Support Group (Corps) and their subordinate battalions and companies; deployed to Canadian Forces Base Gagetown in southern New Brunswick, to simulate the defense of Iceland against Warsaw Pact forces, the CAPSTONE mission of both the 187th and 167th. Part of the 1992 exercise included lanes training as part of the United States Army Forces Command's "Bold Shift" initiative to reinforce unit war-fighting task proficiency.

Operation Northern Viking is a series of defense of Iceland exercises, held biennially for several years. In 2006 the frequency was increased.

== Termination ==
On 15 March 2006, the U.S. Ambassador to Iceland Carol van Voorst announced the decision of the United States to withdraw the Iceland Defense Force before the end of September 2006. On September 30, the American military withdrew its final four Air Force fighter jets and a rescue helicopter squadron from Keflavík. Although NAS Keflavík has closed and the American military has left Iceland, the United States is still responsible for defending its ally and the facilities at Keflavík will still be available, in the event that a "surged expeditionary presence" is deemed necessary.

The Icelandic defence contractor Kögun (now part of Advania) has been contracted to operate and service U.S. Navy communications equipment and facilities left behind.

It was reported in February 2016 that the US Navy would return to Iceland to track Russian submarines.

== See also ==
- Military of Iceland
- Icelandic Coast Guard
- Iceland Crisis Response Unit
- Icelandic Air Policing
- Naval Air Station Keflavik
- Iceland in the Cold War
