= 94th Training Division =

94th Training Division (Force Sustainment)
- 94th Infantry Division shoulder sleeve insignia
- Active: 1918–March 1919 (Provisional); 24 June 1921–7 February 1946 (Organized Reserves); 1 November 1946–1 March 1963 (Army Reserve); 1 March 1963–22 April 1968 (94th ARCOM); 22 April 1968–16 July 2003 (94th RSC); 16 July 2003–16 September 2008 (94th RRC); 16 September 2008–present (94th Training Div.)
- Country: United States
- Branch: United States Army Reserve
- Type: Training
- Size: Division
- Part of: 80th Training Command
- Garrison/HQ: Fort Lee
- Nicknames: "Pilgrim Division" "Neuf Quatres" "Patton's Golden Nugget"
- Engagements: World War II; Northern France; Rhineland; Ardennes-Alsace; Central Europe; Global War on Terrorism; Afghanistan; Iraq

Commanders
- Current commander: BG Christopher Niewind
- Command Sergeant Major: CSM Timothy L. Eddy

Insignia
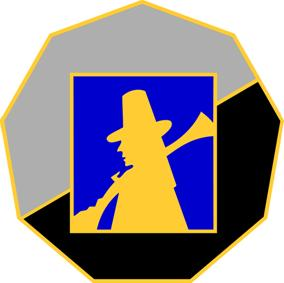
- Distinctive unit insignia

The 94th Training Division (Force Sustainment) is a unit of the United States Army Reserve, charged with providing sustainment training throughout the United States. The division is based at Fort Lee, Virginia and is subordinate to the 80th Training Command. The division has subordinate brigades that perform military occupational specialty (MOS) reclassification training. The division has brigades in the Continental United States.

The division traces its history to the activation of the 94th Division in 1918, which was disbanded with the close of World War I, but reformed in the Organized Reserve from 1921 until 1942. It fought in World War II, was reformed in the now-United States Army Reserve in 1956, and remained an infantry division until 1963. In 1963 it was reduced to the 94th Command Headquarters (Divisional) until the Army's realignment of reserve component combat arms into the Army National Guard in 1967. From 1968 to 1995 it supervised smaller Army Reserve units as an Army Reserve Command (ARCOM). In 1995 it became a Regional Support Command and in 2003 a Regional Readiness Command. It was then inactivated, but reformed as a training division in August 2009. The 94th Infantry Division's standard (flag) and lineage was bestowed upon the 94th Division (Force Sustainment) at its activation in 2009.

The 94th ARCOM/RSC/RRC wore the shoulder sleeve insignia of the 94th Infantry Division but did not, according to the United States Army Center of Military History, perpetuate the lineage of the old division and was thus not entitled to the division's battle honors, as it is against Army policy for TDA organizations, such as ARCOMs, RSCs and RRCs, to perpetuate the lineage of TO&E units, such as infantry divisions. Army Regulation 840-10 dictates that the distinguishing flag of an RRC features a white-bordered, 38.1 cm (15 in.) tall rendering of the shoulder sleeve insignia on a plain blue background, rather than on the horizontally divided bi-colour background of red over blue as carried by an infantry division.

Although the 94th RRC did not carry the lineage of the 94th Infantry Division, today's 94th Military Police Company (formerly under the 94th RRC) carries the lineage of the World War II Military Police Platoon, 94th Infantry Division. The 94th Military Police Company also served in Desert Storm, Bosnia, and most recently Iraq. In 2003-04 the 94th MPs added a battle streamer to their guidon when they were awarded the Valorous Unit Award for their actions in al-Anbar, hunting Iraqi Ba'ath members after the collapse of government and conducting Counter-Insurgency Operations against the increasing militant uprisings in Al-Qaim, Rutbah, Haditha, Baghdad, Ramadi and Fallujah. The 94th MPs were also awarded The "Order of the Spur" by Colonel Teeples of the 3d Armored Cavalry Regiment (3CR), as a nod to the combat action of the 94th Military Police Company during their mission with the 3d Cavalry Regiment. The history and spirit of the Military Police Platoon, 94th Infantry Division of World War II lives on with them.

== History ==
=== World War I ===
The 94th Division originated in 1918 and was intended to be formed with Spanish-speaking troops enlisted from Puerto Rico. The Army found that it lacked enough Spanish-speaking instructors to train men for the support and service units of the division, so it was agreed to create it as a "paper" division comprising only four infantry regiments, like the 93rd Division. The infantry regiments were assigned numbers 373–376, which would have been associated with the National Army's 94th Division. The 373rd and 374th Infantry Regiments were organized with Hispanic Puerto Ricans, while the 375th Infantry was organized with Afro–Puerto Ricans. The 376th Infantry was never organized. With the close of World War I, the units were disbanded at Camp Las Casas, Puerto Rico.

One of the division's nicknames, the "Neuf-Cats," most likely comes from this era, as most World War I combat involving Americans occurred in French-speaking areas and the number "94" was pronounced in French as "Neuf-Quatre", literally, "Nine-Four". As the pronunciation of the numeral four in French is similar to the English word "cat," the division decided to adopt this as a nickname and pluralized it.

=== Interwar period ===
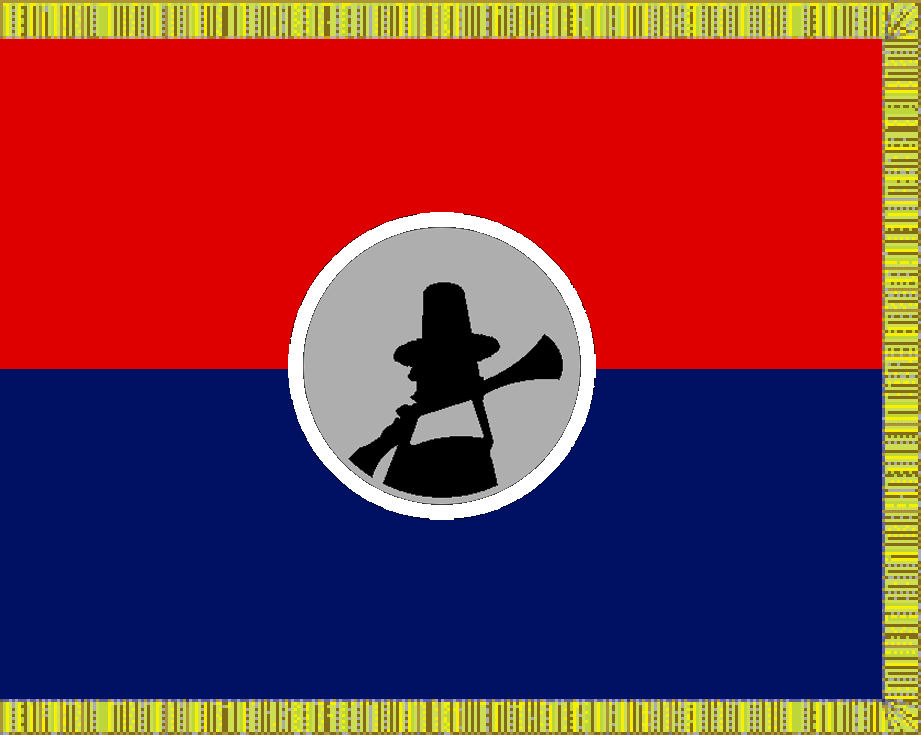
94th Division distinguishing flag, 1923–1942

The 94th Division was constituted in the Organized Reserve (present-day United States Army Reserve) on 24 June 1921, allotted to the First Corps Area, and assigned to the XI Corps. The division was further allotted to the state of Massachusetts as its home area. The 373rd-375th Infantry Regiments were allotted to Puerto Rico's 211th Infantry Brigade as part of a hypothetical division which was never organized, and the 376th Infantry was assigned to the 94th Division. To flesh out the rest of the 94th Division's infantry, the 301st and 302nd Infantry Regiments (part of the 76th Division in World War I) were assigned, along with the newly-constituted 419th Infantry. The 76th Division retained only its World War I-era 304th Infantry, taking the 385th Infantry from the 97th Division and adding the newly-constituted 417th and 418th Infantry Regiments, while the 97th Division took the 76th Division's 303rd Infantry and retained the 386th-388th Infantry Regiments.

The 94th Division headquarters was organized in November 1921 at the Custom House Tower in Boston, and remained there until activated for World War II. The designated mobilization and training station for the division was Camp Devens (redesignated Fort Devens in 1931), Massachusetts, and it was also the location where much of the division's training activities occurred in the interwar years.

The 94th Division was originally nicknamed the "Pilgrim Division" in reference to the cultural history of Massachusetts. A shoulder sleeve insignia featuring a Native American with bow and arrow was authorized on 21 July 1922. This design was superseded 6 September 1923 by one depicting the black silhouette of a Puritan carrying a blunderbuss on his shoulder, on a gray circle, with the wording of the new design's description was amended on 22 December of the same year.

For the few years when the division headquarters was called to duty for annual training as a unit, it often trained with the staff of the 18th Infantry Brigade, 9th Division, at Camp Devens. The annual training of the enlisted personnel of the headquarters included staff training, branch-specific training, and division-level command post exercises. For several years, the division conducted a “Special Officers Camp” at Camp Devens for unassigned officers, officers who could not attend training with their assigned units, and basic officer training for recent Reserve Officers' Training Corps and Citizens Military Training Camp commissionees. The division’s subordinate units trained all over the First Corps Area. The infantry regiments, for example, held their annual training primarily with the units of the 18th Infantry Brigade at Camp Devens and Fort Ethan Allen, Vermont. Other units, such as the special troops, artillery, engineers, aviation, medical, and quartermaster, trained at various posts in the First, Second, and Third Corps Areas, often with the active units of the 1st and 9th Divisions. For example, the division artillery trained at Fort Ethan Allen with the 7th Field Artillery; the 319th Engineer Regiment trained at Fort DuPont, Delaware, with the 1st Engineer Regiment; the 319th Medical Regiment trained at Carlisle Barracks, Pennsylvania, with the 1st Medical Regiment; and the 319th Observation Squadron trained with the 5th Observation Squadron at Mitchel Field, New York.

In addition to the unit training camps, the infantry regiments rotated responsibility to conduct the Citizens Military Training Camps at Camp Devens each year. On a number of occasions, the division participated in First Corps Area and First Army command post exercises in conjunction with other Regular Army, National Guard, and Organized Reserve units. However, Organized Reserve units were even more seriously under-strength and received even less equipment and funds with which to train than did Regular and Guard units, which meant that the 94th Division did not participate in the various First Corps Area maneuvers and the First Army maneuvers of 1935, 1939, and 1941 as an organized unit due to lack of enlisted personnel and equipment. Instead, the officers and a few enlisted reservists were assigned to Regular and Guard units to fill vacant slots and bring the units up to war strength for the exercises. Additionally, some officers were assigned duties as umpires or support personnel.

=== World War II ===
- Called into federal service: 15 September 1942, Fort Custer, Michigan
- Overseas: 6 August 1944.
- Campaigns: Northern France, Rhineland, Ardennes-Alsace, Central Europe
- Days of combat: 209
- Commanders:
  - Major General Harry J. Malony (1 July 1942 through 30 June 1945)
  - Brigadier General Louis Joseph Fortier (30 June 1945 through 31 July 1945)
  - Major General Allison J. Barnett (1 August 1945 through 9 February 1946)
- Returned to U.S.: 6 February 1946
- Inactivated: 7 February 1946 at Camp Kilmer, New Jersey

==== Mobilization ====
The 94th Division, like the other divisions of the Organized Reserve was not mobilized as a complete unit. In August 1940, President Franklin D. Roosevelt was given permission by Congress to order all members and units of the National Guard and all members of the Organized Reserve to active duty for one year. The officers and men of the 94th Division were subsequently individually assigned to existing Regular Army and National Guard units as needed, leaving the division virtually unmanned. The majority of mid-level officers (captains through lieutenant colonels) in the U.S. Army during the Second World War were Reserve officers. As such, the 94th provided leaders to every theater in the war.

Before Organized Reserve infantry divisions were ordered into active military service, they were reorganized on paper as "triangular" divisions under the 1940 tables of organization. The headquarters companies of the two infantry brigades were consolidated into the division's cavalry reconnaissance troop, and one infantry regiment was removed by inactivation. The field artillery brigade headquarters and headquarters battery became the headquarters and headquarters battery of the division artillery. Its three field artillery regiments were reorganized into four battalions; one battalion was taken from each of the two 75 mm gun regiments to form two 105 mm howitzer battalions, the brigade's ammunition train was reorganized as the third 105 mm howitzer battalion, and the 155 mm howitzer battalion was formed from the 155 mm howitzer regiment. The engineer, medical, and quartermaster regiments were reorganized into battalions. In 1942, divisional quartermaster battalions were split into ordnance light maintenance companies and quartermaster companies, and the division's headquarters and military police company, which had previously been a combined unit, was split.

==== Division organization ====
The division consisted of the following units:

94th Infantry Division organization (click to enlarge)

- 94th Infantry Division
  - 94th Infantry Division Headquarters
  - 94th Cavalry Reconnaissance Troop (Mechanized) (M3 scout cars and then M8 Greyhound armored cars)
  - 301st Infantry Regiment
    - Headquarters and Headquarters Company
    - 3× Infantry battalions
      - each battalion consists of: 1× Headquarters and Headquarters Company, 3× Rifle companies, 1× Heavy Weapons Company
    - Cannon Company (T12 Gun Motor Carriages and T19 Howitzer Motor Carriages, later replaced by either M3 105mm towed howitzers or M7 Priest self propelled howitzers)
    - Anti-Tank Company (M3 37mm anti-tank guns, which were replaced by 1944 with M1 57mm anti-tank guns)
    - Service Company
  - 302nd Infantry Regiment
    - same organization as 301st Infantry Regiment
  - 376th Infantry Regiment
    - same organization as 301st Infantry Regiment
  - 94th Infantry Division Artillery
    - Headquarters and Headquarters Battery
    - 301st Field Artillery Battalion
      - Headquarters and Headquarters Battery
      - 3× Batteries (M2 105mm towed howitzers)
      - Service Battery
    - 356th Field Artillery Battalion
      - same organization as 301st Field Artillery Battalion
    - 390th Field Artillery Battalion
      - Headquarters and Headquarters Battery
      - 3× Batteries (M1 155mm towed howitzers)
      - Service Battery
    - 919th Field Artillery Battalion
      - same organization as 301st Field Artillery Battalion
  - Headquarters Special Troops
    - Headquarters Company, 94th Infantry Division
    - 94th Signal Company
    - 94th Quartermaster Company
    - 794th Ordnance Light Maintenance Company
    - Military Police Platoon
    - 94th Infantry Division Band (attached)
  - 319th Engineer Combat Battalion
    - Headquarters and Headquarters and Service Company
    - 3× Engineer combat companies
  - 319th Medical Battalion
    - Headquarters and Headquarters Detachment
    - 3× Collecting companies
    - Clearing Company

==== Training ====
With virtually all of the division's personnel having gone off to war without it, the 94th Division existed only on paper when its shoulder sleeve insignia was changed on 5 September 1942 to a half-black, half-gray circle with the Arabic numerals 9 and 4 superimposed in reverse colors. Ten days later, on 15 September 1942, the division was ordered into active military service as the 94th Infantry Division at Fort Custer near Kalamazoo, Michigan. To effect the initial organization of the 94th, the officer cadre below regimental level and the entire enlisted cadre was selected from the soldiers of the 77th Infantry Division, then stationed at Fort Jackson, South Carolina. Enlisted fillers to bring the division to full strength were not yet available and it was realized that the range facilities at Camp Custer would be inadequate to train an infantry division, so the Army Ground Forces ordered the 94th Infantry Division to Camp Phillips, near Salina, Kansas, in October 1942. From 5 to 20 December, filler replacements were received at Camp Phillips at the rate of 1,000 per day. The division remained at Camp Phillips until August 1943, and then trained at the Tennessee Maneuver Area until November 1943 before moving to a temporary station at Camp Forrest, near Tullahoma, Tennessee. During the maneuvers in Tennessee, the 94th Division was ordered to furnish 1,500 men as overseas replacements, and each of the 94th Infantry Division's infantry battalions also transferred 100 men to the 8th Infantry Division, which had been alerted for overseas movement. The 94th Infantry Division then moved to Camp McCain, Mississippi, where it was alerted for overseas movement in May 1944.

On 10 July 1944, the 376th Infantry Regiment was honored by Army and civilian dignitaries as the first "Expert Infantry Regiment" in U.S. Army history, meaning at least sixty-five percent of its soldiers had earned the Expert Infantryman Badge. The other two regiments of the 94th Infantry Division, the 301st and 302nd, qualified three days after the 376th as Expert Infantry Regiments, although they did not match the record of the latter regiment, which also had every company qualify for the "Expert Infantry Company" streamer.

==== Combat chronicle ====
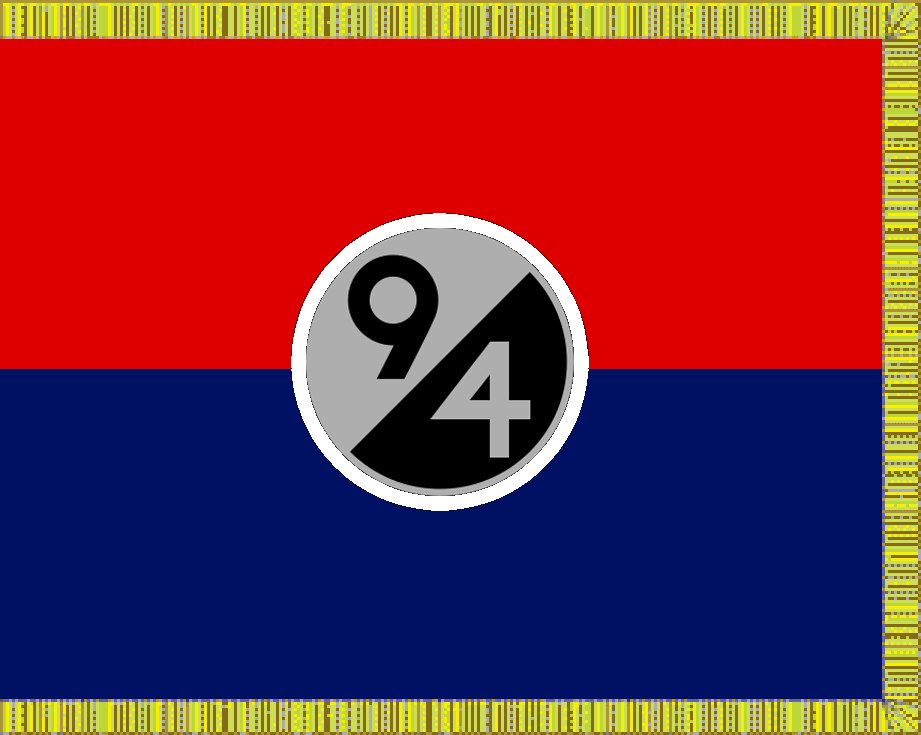
94th Infantry Division distinguishing flag, 1942–1956

Following a brief stay in England, the 94th landed on Utah Beach, France on D-Day + 94, 8 September 1944, and moved into Brittany to relieve the 6th Armored Division and assume responsibility for containing some 60,000 German troops besieged in their garrisons at the Channel ports of Lorient and Saint-Nazaire. The 94th inflicted over 2,700 casualties on the enemy and took 566 prisoners before being relieved by the 66th Infantry Division on New Year's Day 1945.

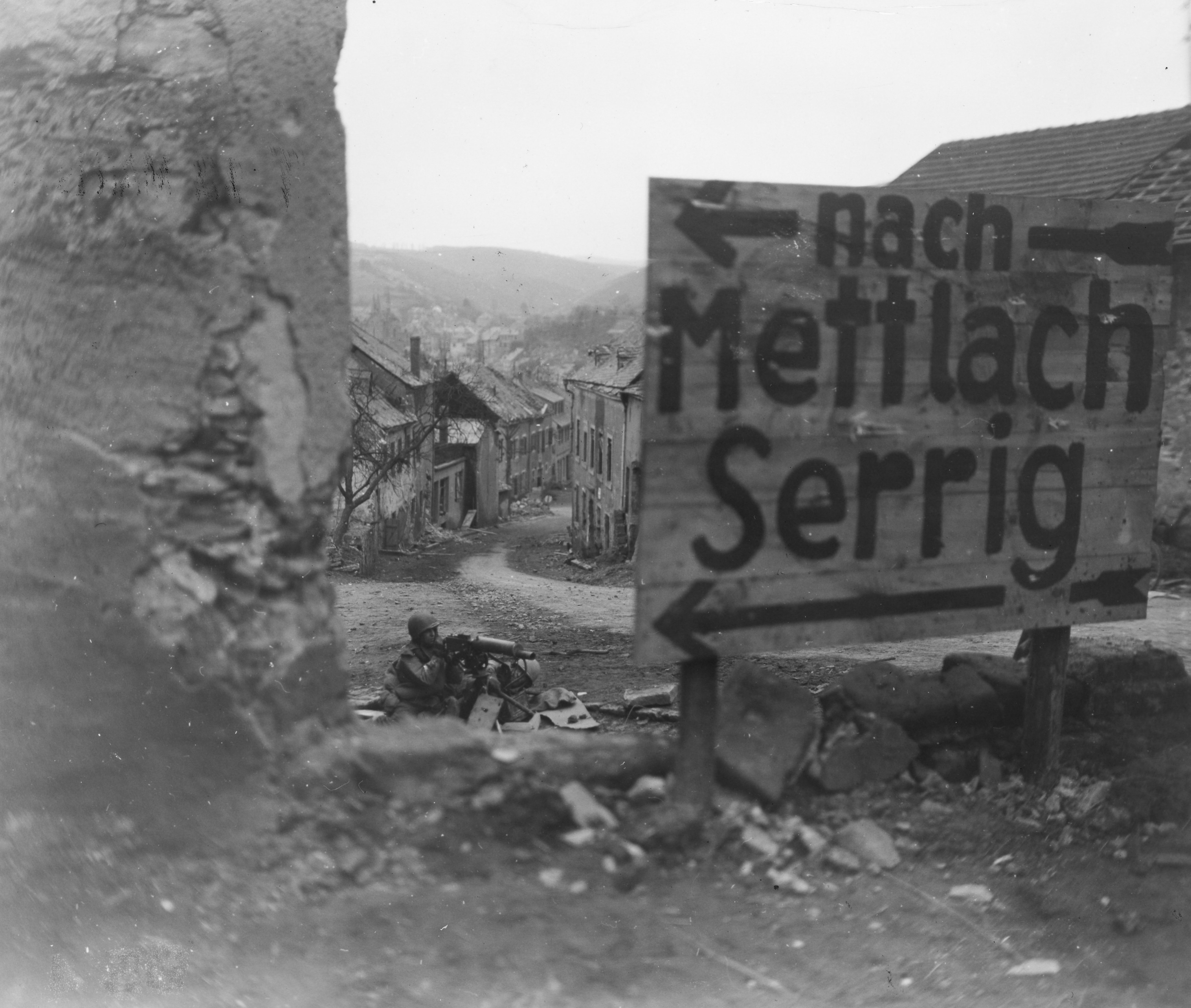
A machine gun team of the 94th Infantry Division in Beurig, Germany. 26 February 1945

As part of General George Patton's United States Third Army, the 94th Infantry Division ("94th ID") was known as "Patton's Golden Nugget". Moving east, the division relieved the 90th Infantry Division on 7 January 1945, taking positions in the Saar-Moselle Triangle south of Wasserbillig, facing the Siegfried Switch Line. Fresh for the fight, the 94th shifted to the offensive, 14 January, seizing Tettingen and Butzdorf that day. The following day, the Nennig-Berg-Wies area was wrested from the enemy, severe counterattacks followed, and it was at Nennig that the Germans gave the division its nickname "Roosevelt's Butchers" for stacking the dead in houses and along roads. Butzdorf, Berg, and most of Nennig changed hands several times before being finally secured. On the 20th, an unsuccessful battalion attack against Orscholz, eastern terminus of the switch position, resulted in loss of most of two companies. In early February, the division took Campholz Woods and seized Sinz. On 19 February 1945, supported by heavy artillery and air support, the division launched a full-scale attack with all three regiments, storming the heights of Munzigen Ridge, to breach the Siegfried Line switch-line defenses and clear the Berg-Munzingen Highway.

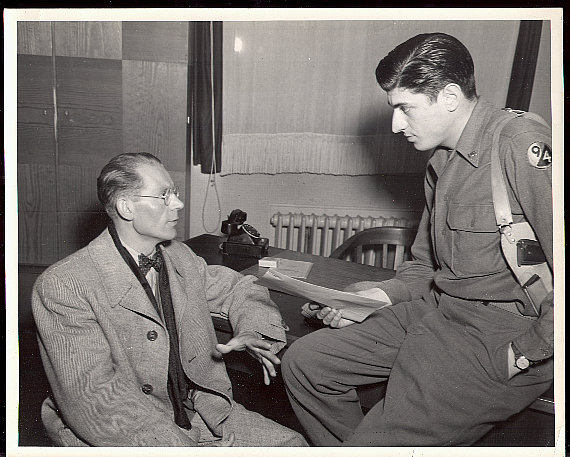
S/Sgt. Ralph Lubow, New York City with the Counter Intelligence Corps, 94th Div., Fifteenth U.S. Army, interviews Dr. Peter Hagemaan of the Netherlands. Dr. Hagemaan was ordered to install an electrical alarm system in Hitler's mountain retreat in Berchtesgaden during March 1943, thereby detecting the presence of unwanted persons from a distance of 20 kilometers. Düsseldorf, Germany. 27 April 1945. Photo U.S. Army (scanned courtesy nkyphotos, Newport, KY.

Moving forward, the 94th Infantry Division and the 10th Armored Division secured the area from Orscholz and Saarburg to the confluence of the Saar and Moselle Rivers by 21 February 1945. At Ayl, General Patton ordered troops to cross the Saar immediately, against the advice of many of his officers. Under command of Lieutenant Colonel William A. McNulty, the 94th's 3rd Battalion, 301st Infantry Regiment crossed the icy and swollen Saar on 23 February 1945.

Despite Lt. Col. McNulty's own preparatory reconnaissance in absence of other adequate intelligence and undertaken at considerable personal risk, many men and materiel were lost during the very ill-prepared Saar crossing. Two of the three crossings sites were eventually abandoned due to heavy and pinpoint German artillery and machinegun fire. After establishing a bridgehead at Serrig, the 376th Infantry Regiment was detached to assist the 10th Armored Division in the capture of Trier. By 2 March 1945, the division stretched over a 10-mile front, from Hocker Hill on the Saar through Zerf, and Lampaden to Ollmuth. A heavy German attack near Lampaden achieved penetrations, but the line was shortly restored, and on 13 March, spearheading XX Corps, the division broke out of the Ruwer River bridgehead by ford and bridge. Driving forward, the 94th reached the Rhine on 21 March, where it fought in the Battle for Ludwigshafen. Ludwigshafen was taken on 24 March, in conjunction with Combat Command A of the 12th Armored Division.

The division then moved by rail and motor to the vicinity of Krefeld, Germany, relieving the 102nd Infantry Division on 3 April and assuming responsibility for containing the western side of the Ruhr Pocket from positions along the Rhine. With the reduction of the pocket in mid-April, the division was assigned military government duties, first in the Krefeld and later in the Düsseldorf areas.

By mid-April, the division relieved the 101st Airborne Division and assumed military government duties, first in the Krefeld vicinity and later around Düsseldorf. It was in that status when hostilities were declared at an end on 7 May 1945. From mid-June until the end of November, the division served the military government in Czechoslovakia.

The 94th Infantry Division was inactivated at Camp Kilmer, New Jersey on 9 February 1946.

==== Casualties ====
- Total battle casualties: 6,533
- Killed in action: 1,009
- Wounded in action: 4,789
- Missing in action: 116
- Prisoner of war: 619

==== Assignments in ETO ====
- 27 July 1944: XIII Corps, Ninth Army.
- 28 August 1944: XIII Corps, Ninth Army, 12th Army Group.
- 23 September 1944: Ninth Army, 12th Army Group.
- 9 October 1944: 12th Army Group.
- 5 January 1945: 12th Army Group, but attached to Oise Section, Communication Zone, for supply.
- 6 January 1945: XX Corps, Third Army, 12th Army Group.
- 29 March 1945: XII Corps, Fifteenth Army, 12th Army Group.

==== Individual awards ====
- Awards:
  - Unit
    - 1 Presidential Unit Citation
  - Individual
    - 1 Medal of Honor
    - 54 Distinguished Service Crosses
    - 2 Distinguished Service Medals
    - 510 Silver Stars
    - 10 Legions of Merit
    - 12 Soldier's Medals
    - 2792 Bronze Star Medals
    - 66 Air Medals

=== Cold War ===
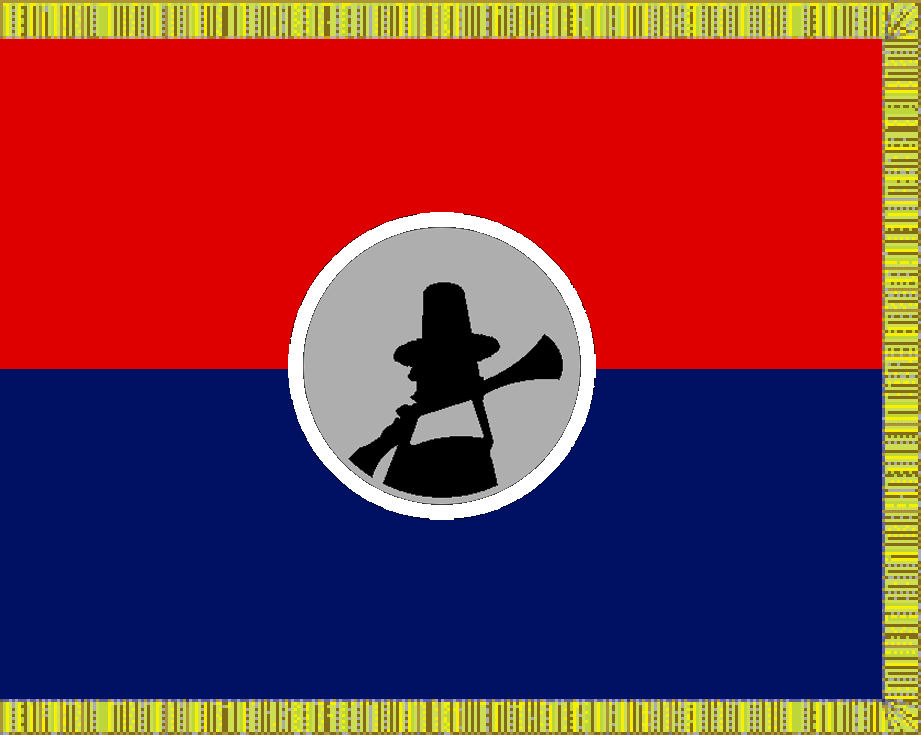
94th Infantry Division distinguishing flag, 1956–1967

The division was reactivated in the United States Army Reserve in 1956. On 14 May of that year, the "9/4" shoulder sleeve insignia was rescinded, and the former Puritan shoulder sleeve insignia (with a minor change in the design) was reinstated.

==== 94th Command Headquarters (Divisional) ====
The division was redesignated the 94th Command Headquarters (Divisional) on 16 October 1963, and was deactivated in 1967 as part of the compromise between U.S. Secretary of Defense Robert S. McNamara who wanted to merge the Army Reserve into the Army National Guard, and the United States Congress who wanted to maintain the Army Reserve as it then existed. Under the compromise plan, all of the combat divisions and most separate combat brigades of the Army Reserve were deactivated with a corresponding increase in the National Guard; at the same time, non-divisional combat support and combat service support units were reallocated in the Army Reserve.

==== 94th Army Reserve Command ====
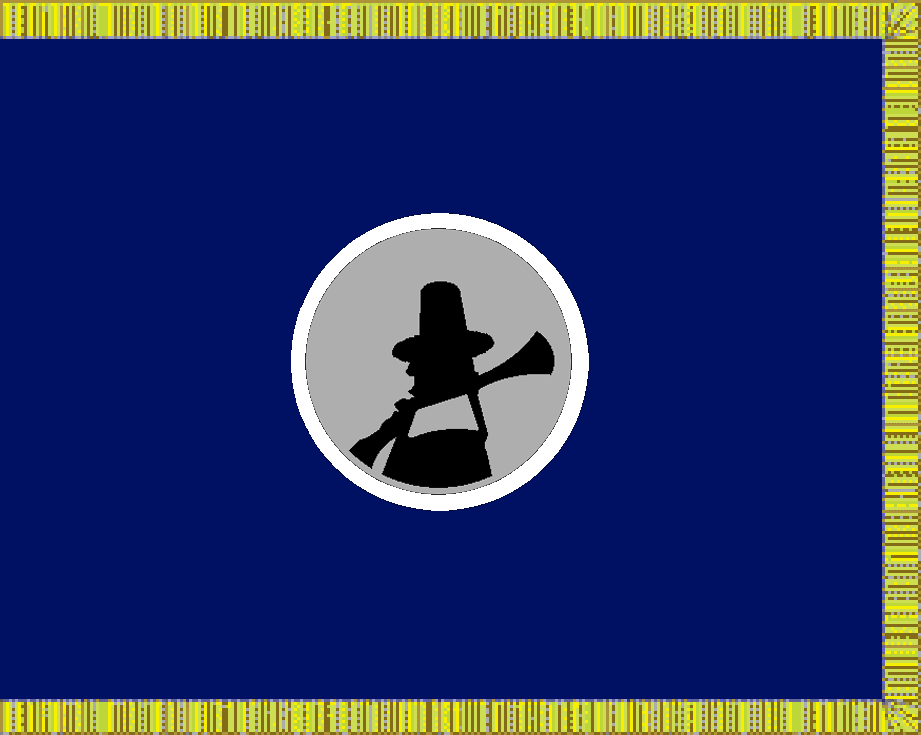
94th Army Reserve Command distinguishing flag, 1968–91.

Under the aforementioned compromise plan agreed to by the Congress and the Defense Department, the fourteen area corps were deactivated; in their place, eighteen army reserve commands ("ARCOMs") were established. Commanded by a reserve major general, each ARCOM served as a regional non-tactical peacetime headquarters for unrelated support units. Each ARCOM was, in turn, assigned to one of five continental U.S. armies ("CONUSAs") under Continental Army Command ("CONARC"). On 22 April 1968, the number and shoulder-sleeve insignia of the former 94th Division were re-allocated to the new 94th U.S. Army Reserve Command ("ARCOM"), headquartered at Hanscom Air Force Base, Massachusetts and subordinate to First United States Army.

Two company-level units within the 94th ARCOM served in the Vietnam War: Headquarters & Headquarters Company, 513th Maintenance Battalion (Direct Support); and the 241st Military Intelligence Detachment.

The 94th Army Reserve Command (later redesignated 94th Regional Support Command and 94th Regional Readiness Command) was a regional command and control headquarters over most United States Army Reserve units throughout the six New England states of Maine, Massachusetts, Vermont, New Hampshire, Connecticut, and Rhode Island. For forty years, beginning in the late 1960s, the United States Army Reserve was divided up into a varying number of regional, branch-immaterial commands. Originally designated "army reserve commands" ("ARCOMs"), several were disbanded in and around 1995, while the remainder were redesignated "regional support commands" ("RSCs") at that time and re-dubbed "regional readiness commands" ("RRCs") in 2001. In addition to the RRCs, several mission-oriented commands were established, including such as training divisions and engineer commands. Like most RRCs, the 94th Regional Readiness Command was scheduled to be deactivated in fiscal year 2009 as part of the Army Reserve's reorganization into a functionally based command structure reporting to respective major Army commands ("MACOMs"); plans were altered, the 94th became a training division headquartered at Fort Lee,

94th ARCOM units participated annually in Exercise REFORGER (from REturn of FORces to GERmany) and Operation Bright Star throughout the Cold War. These exercises were intended to ensure that NATO and the United States military had the ability to quickly deploy forces to West Germany and Egypt in the event of a conflict with the Soviet Union.

In 1980, the peacetime Army Reserve chain of command was overlaid with a CAPSTONE wartime trace. In an expansion of the roundout and affiliation program begun ten years earlier, CAPSTONE purported to align every Army Reserve unit with the active and reserve component units with which they were anticipated to deploy. Units maintained lines of communication with the units—often hundreds or thousands of miles away in peacetime—who would presumably serve above or below them in the event of mobilization. This communication, in some cases, extended to coordinated annual training opportunities.

Many of the 94th's units and individual soldiers rotated through Honduras in the 1980s. Operation Fuertes Caminos ("strong roads") provided villagers with roads on which to move their crops to market, while providing invaluable real-world training and experience to reserve engineers, medical personnel, logisticians and others.

Operation Nordic Shield was held in the summer of 1987. Units of the 94th ARCOM; principally the 187th Infantry Brigade (Separate), the 167th Support Group (Corps) and their subordinate battalions and companies; deployed to Canadian Forces Base Gagetown in southern New Brunswick, to simulate the defense of Iceland against Warsaw Pact forces, the CAPSTONE mission of both the 187th and 167th.

Units under the 94th Army Reserve Command participated in a series of mobilization exercises in the 1980s, including the Selected Reserve Call-Up (23–25 October 1987), Golden Thrust '88 (November 1988), and Proud Eagle 90 (12 October through 2 November 1989). Each of these was designed to evaluate not only the units' ability to prepare to mobilize, but to examine the mobilization processes, systems, and logistical coordination so as to find and correct the unanticipated flaws.

In 1990–1991, over 1,000 soldiers from the 94th ARCOM served overseas in support of Operation Desert Shield and Desert Storm. Despite the commonly held belief that CAPSTONE traces were set in stone, the process of selecting units to mobilize and deploy largely ignored CAPSTONE.

=== Post Cold War ===
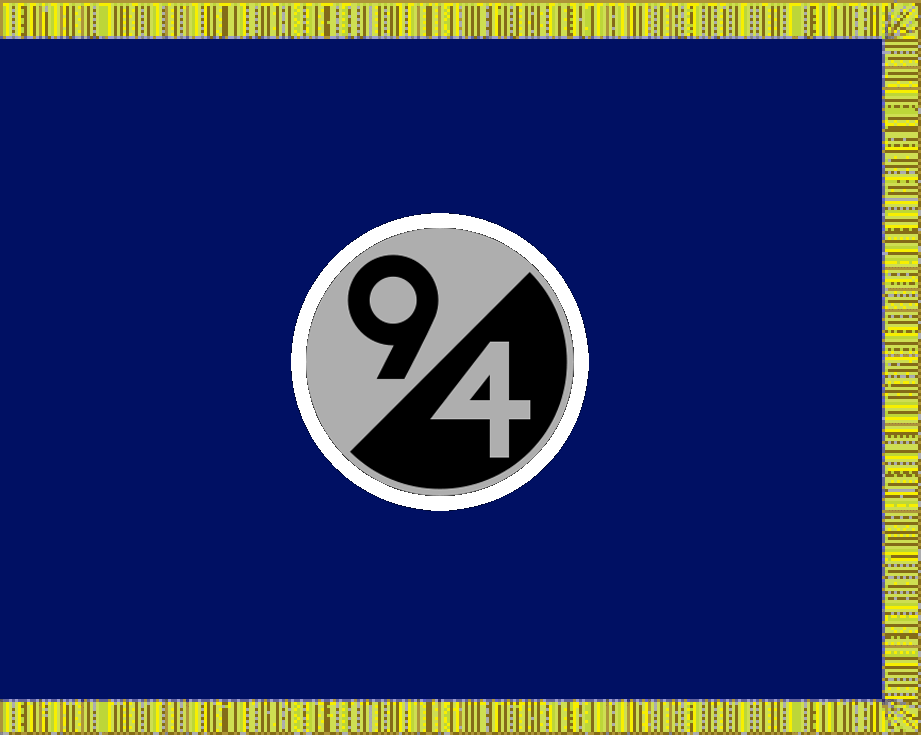
94th Regional Support Command / Regional Readiness Command distinguishing flag, 1991–2009

The ARCOM's Puritan shoulder sleeve insignia reverted again to the "9/4" design on 27 November 1991.

Operation Nordic Shield II was held in the summer of 1992. As they did five years before, units of the 94th ARCOM; principally the 187th Infantry Brigade (Separate), the 167th Support Group (Corps) and their subordinate battalions and companies; deployed to Canadian Forces Base Gagetown in southern New Brunswick, to simulate the defense of Iceland against Warsaw Pact forces, the CAPSTONE mission of both the 187th and 167th. Part of the 1992 exercise included lanes training as part of the United States Army Forces Command's "Bold Shift" initiative to reinforce unit war-fighting task proficiency.

In 1995, the 94th ARCOM was redesignated the 94th Regional Support Command (RSC) and moved from Hanscom Air Force Base to Fort Devens, Massachusetts.

The 94th RSC deployed soldiers to Honduras and Guatemala in 1999 in support of Operation New Horizon, and later to the Balkans in support of Operation Joint Guardian and Operation Joint Forge. Continuing with Operation New Horizon, the command deployed members of the 94th Military Police Company to Rambala-Bocas del Toro, Panama in spring 2007.

=== Global war on terror ===
After 11 September 2001, the 94th RSC deployed soldiers in support of Operations Noble Eagle, Enduring Freedom and Iraqi Freedom. Mission areas include Continental United States ("CONUS"), Afghanistan, Uzbekistan, Iraq, Kuwait, the Horn of Africa and Guantanamo Bay Naval Base, Cuba.

The 804th Medical Brigade, a major subordinate command of the 94th Regional Support Command, mobilized at Fort Devens and trained for combat in support of operations in Kuwait (and eventually Iraq) at Fort Drum, New York in February 2003. The 804th arrived in Kuwait in March 2003 and assumed command and control of over 4400 soldiers in five countries in support of both Operation Iraqi Freedom and Operation Enduring Freedom. In mid-February 2004 the 804th arrived back at Fort Devens after successfully completing an over 12-month activation. The 804th conducted a relief-in-place/transfer-of-authority with the 8th Medical Brigade from New York City.

In December 2002, the 94th RSC moved into its final headquarters at Fort Devens, Massachusetts.

==== 94th Regional Readiness Command ====
In August 2003, the 94th RSC was redesignated the 94th Regional Readiness Command (RRC).

At its end, the 94th Regional Readiness Command was made up of more than 6,000 citizen-soldiers serving within fifty-six units located throughout New England.

The 94th RRC mobilized and deployed over twenty units and more than 2,500 soldiers to fight in the war on terrorism.

==== 94th Division rebirth in the 21st century ====
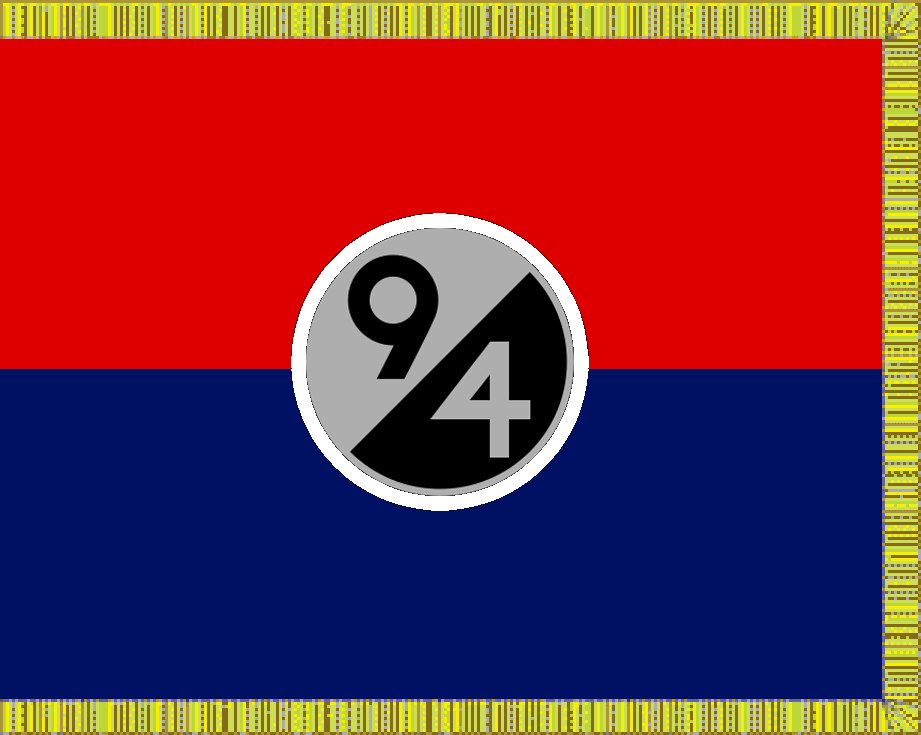
94th Division (Force Sustainment) distinguishing flag, 2009–present

In September 2008, the 94th Training Division (Force Sustainment) entered "carrier status", under the command of Brigadier General Mark Corson, at Ft. Lee, Virginia. The division is one of three major divisions under the umbrella of the 80th Training Command (The Army School System), the third-largest command organization in the U.S. Army Reserve.

On 17 October 2009, the 94th Training Division was reactivated, under the command of Brigadier General Karen LeDoux, at Ft. Lee, Virginia. The activation ceremony included many of the veterans of who served in the 94th Infantry Division during World War II. The event included the 3rd Infantry Regiment (The Old Guard) and its Fife and Drum Corps.

The 94th Training Division's original red and blue colors flown by the division during World War II were returned by Army Heraldry.

== Organization ==
The 94th Training Division (Force Sustainment) is a subordinate unit of the 80th Training Command (The Army School System — TASS). As of January 2026 the division consists of the following units:

- 94th Training Division (Force Sustainment), at Fort Lee (VA)
  - Regional Training Site-Maintenance Fort Devens, at Fort Devens (MA)
  - Regional Training Site-Maintenance Fort Hood, at Fort Hood (TX)
  - Regional Training Site-Maintenance Fort Indiantown Gap, at Fort Indiantown Gap (PA)
  - Regional Training Site-Maintenance Fort McCoy, at Fort McCoy (WI)
  - 1st Brigade (Quartermaster), in Charleston (WV)
    - 8th Battalion, 80th Regiment (Quartermaster), at Fort Pickett (VA)
      - Detachment 1, 8th Battalion, 80th Regiment (Quartermaster), in Lodi (NJ)
      - Detachment 2, 8th Battalion, 80th Regiment (Quartermaster), at Fort Indiantown Gap (PA)
      - Detachment 3, 8th Battalion, 80th Regiment (Quartermaster), at Fort Lee (VA)
    - 9th Battalion, 95th Regiment (Quartermaster), at Fort Des Moines (IA)
    - 7th Battalion, 100th Regiment (Quartermaster), in Columbus (OH)
      - Detachment 1, 7th Battalion, 100th Regiment (Quartermaster), in Jackson (TN)
    - 8th Battalion, 104th Regiment (Quartermaster), at Fort Douglas (UT)
    - 9th Battalion, 108th Regiment (Quartermaster), in Decatur (GA)
      - Detachment 1, 9th Battalion, 108th Regiment (Quartermaster), in Montgomery (AL)
  - 2nd Brigade (Transportation), at Fort Lee (VA)
    - 7th Battalion, 80th Regiment (Transportation), at Fort Eustis (VA)
      - Detachment 1, 7th Battalion, 80th Regiment (Transportation), in Amherst (NY)
    - 8th Battalion, 95th Regiment (Transportation), in Bossier City (LA)
    - 6th Battalion, 100th Regiment (Transportation), at Fort Sheridan (IL)
      - Detachment 1, 6th Battalion, 100th Regiment (Transportation), at Fort Knox (KY)
    - 7th Battalion, 104th Regiment (Transportation), in Bell (CA)
    - 8th Battalion, 108th Regiment (Transportation), in Jackson (MS)
      - Detachment 1, 8th Battalion, 108th Regiment (Transportation), in Decatur (GA)
  - 3rd Brigade (Ordnance), in Indianapolis (IN)
    - 5th Battalion, 80th Regiment (Ordnance), at Aberdeen Proving Ground (MD)
    - 14th Battalion, 95th Regiment (Ordnance), in Grand Prairie (TX)
    - 7th Battalion, 98th Regiment (Ordnance), at Fort Devens (MA)
    - 13th Battalion, 100th Regiment (Ordnance), at Fort McCoy (WI)
    - 13th Battalion, 108th Regiment (Ordnance), at Redstone Arsenal (AL)
  - 4th Brigade (Personnel Services), in Decatur (GA)
    - 7th Battalion, 95th Regiment (Personnel Services), in Grand Prairie (TX)
    - 8th Battalion, 98th Regiment (Personnel Services), at Joint Base McGuire–Dix–Lakehurst (NJ)
      - Detachment 1, 8th Battalion, 98th Regiment (Personnel Services), in Richmond (VA)
    - 5th Battalion, 100th Regiment (Personnel Services), in Homewood (IL)
      - Detachment 1, 5th Battalion, 100th Regiment (Personnel Services), in Millington (TN)
    - 6th Battalion, 104th Regiment (Personnel Services), at Camp Parks (CA)
    - 7th Battalion, 108th Regiment (Personnel Services), at Fort Jackson (SC)
      - Detachment 1, 7th Battalion, 108th Regiment (Personnel Services), in Jackson (MS)
      - Detachment 2, 7th Battalion, 108th Regiment (Personnel Services), in West Palm Beach (FL)
  - 5th Brigade (Health Services), at Joint Base San Antonio (TX)
    - 10th Battalion, 95th Regiment (Health Services), in Houston (TX)
      - Detachment 1, 10th Battalion, 95th Regiment (Health Services), at Joint Base San Antonio (TX)
    - 11th Battalion, 98th Regiment (Health Services), at Fort Devens (MA)
      - Detachment 1, 11th Battalion, 98th Regiment (Health Services), at Fort Hamilton (NY)
      - Detachment 2, 11th Battalion, 98th Regiment (Health Services), in Newark (DE)
    - 8th Battalion, 100th Regiment (Health Services), in Millington (TN)
      - Detachment 1, 8th Battalion, 100th Regiment (Health Services), in Milwaukee (WI)
      - Detachment 2, 8th Battalion, 100th Regiment (Health Services), in Columbus (OH)
    - 9th Battalion, 104th Regiment (Health Services), at Camp Parks (CA)
    - 10th Battalion, 108th Regiment (Health Services), in Jacksonville (FL)
      - Detachment 1, 10th Battalion, 108th Regiment (Health Services), in Augusta (GA)

== Insignia ==
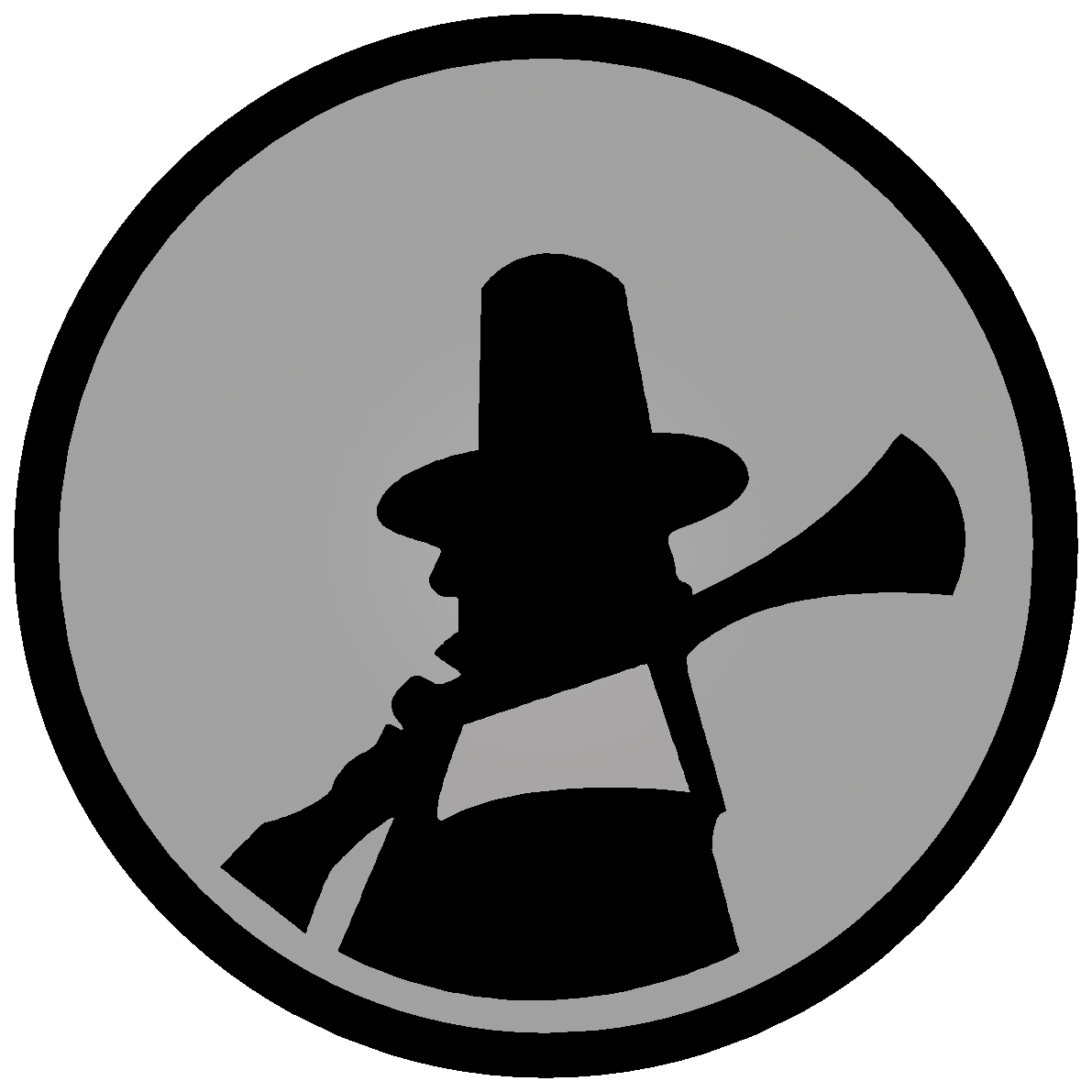

=== Shoulder sleeve insignia (SSI) ===
- Native American design: Featured a Native American with bow and arrow.
- Puritan design:
  - Description: On a disc silver gray, edged with a 0.32 cm (0.13 in) black border, depicting the black silhouette of a Puritan carrying a flintlock blunderbuss on his shoulder. (This insignia was derisively referred to by some as the "Puking Pilgrim".)
  - Symbolism: Being organized in New England, the armed Puritan symbolized colonial era militiamen who were the figurative (and, in some cases, literal) ancestors of the division's soldiers.
- "9/4" design:
  - Description: a black Arabic numeral "9" on the silver gray and a silver gray Arabic numeral "4" on the black. The diameter is 6.35 cm (2.50 in).
  - Symbolism: The insignia represents the numerical designation of the unit.

- Background:
  - A design featuring a Native American with bow and arrow was authorized for the 94th Division on 21 July 1922.
  - The above design was superseded by approval of the design of a Puritan carrying a blunderbuss on his shoulder on 6 September 1923.
  - The above approval was amended to change the wording of the description on 22 December 1923.
  - The Puritan design was superseded by design featuring the Arabic numerals "9" and "4" on 5 September 1942.
  - The "9/4" design was rescinded (canceled) on 14 May 1956. The same letter reinstated the Puritan shoulder sleeve insignia, with a minor change in the design, for the 94th Infantry Division.
  - The Puritan design was redesignated for the 94th Command Headquarters (Divisional) on 16 October 1963.
  - The Puritan design was authorized for the 94th Army Reserve Command on 22 April 1968.
  - The Puritan design was rescinded (canceled) on 27 November 1991. The same letter reinstated the "9/4" design.
  - The insignia was redesignated effective 16 July 2003 for the 94th Regional Readiness Command.

=== Distinctive unit insignia (DUI) ===
- Description: A gold color metal and enamel device, 2.86 cm (1.13 in) high overall, consisting of a nonagon divided diagonally from lower left to upper right, the upper area light gray and the lower area black, bearing overall a blue oblong with long axis vertical, charged with a gold silhouette of the bust of a Puritan with flintlock blunderbuss on his shoulder.
- Symbolism: The diagonally divided gray and black background refers to the shoulder sleeve insignia worn by the 94th Infantry Division during World War II, and by the 94th ARCOM/RSC/RRC in 1991–2009. The geometric four-sided figure commemorates the four European campaign honors. Blue is the color used for infantry. The bust of the Puritan with flintlock blunderbuss is from the shoulder sleeve insignia worn during the period 1923–1942 and 1956–1991. It represents the history and traditions of the area with which past and present organizations have always identified. The nine sides of the device and the four sides of the oblong also allude to the numerical designation of the unit.
- Background: The distinctive unit insignia was originally authorized for the 94th U.S. Army Reserve Command on 4 June 1970. It was reassigned and authorized for 94th U.S. Army Regional Support Command on 16 April 1996. The insignia was redesignated effective 16 July 2003 for the U.S. Army 94th Regional Readiness Command.

== Nicknames ==
- "Pilgrim Division" (pre-World War II)
- "Neuf-Cats" (official, derived from the French "neuf quatre", meaning "nine four")
- "Patton's Golden Nugget" (unofficial while assigned to Third U.S. Army in 1945)
- "Roosevelt's Bloody Butchers" (unofficial German nickname)

== Legacy ==
- Until the re-merger of the division's and division HHC's lineages with those of the reserve command and reserve command HHC, only the Londonderry, New Hampshire-based 94th Military Police Company, retained direct lineage to the 94th Infantry Division's organic structure.
- In 1963, a separate infantry brigade was organized in the US Army Reserve using the lineage of the division's 1st Brigade. As a separate brigade, however, it was granted its own shoulder sleeve insignia. The 187th Infantry Brigade was inactivated in 1994.
- State Highway 94 in Colorado, Connecticut, New Jersey, New York, and Pennsylvania are numbered after the 94th Infantry Division.
- Interstate 94 (I-94) in southwestern Michigan is named the 94th Infantry Division Highway. It runs past Fort Custer where the division was formed and trained during World War II.
- The 94th Infantry Division also has a World War II reenacting unit by the same name. The 94th Infantry Living History Alliance was formed in 2004 and has been working with the veterans and divisional histories to accurately portray the division. They are honored by the 94th Infantry veterans and alliance as being Division's official living historians.

== Popular culture ==
The movie "Everyman's War" (Thad T. Smith, 2009) is about a platoon of the 94th Infantry Division near Saint-Nazaire (France) in September 1944 and during the battle of the Bulge.
