= 167th Combat Sustainment Support Battalion =

167th Support Group (Corps), 1971–2006 167th Support Battalion, 2006–present
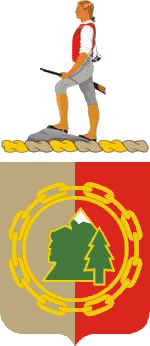
- Coat of Arms
- Active: 1971–2006 (group); 2006–present (battalion)
- Country: United States
- Branch: United States Army Reserve
- Type: Support (logistics)
- Role: command & control of subordinate logistical companies
- Size: group 1971–2006 battalion 2006–present
- Part of: Forces Command
- Garrison/HQ: Londonderry, New Hampshire
- Motto: "Links of Strength"

Insignia
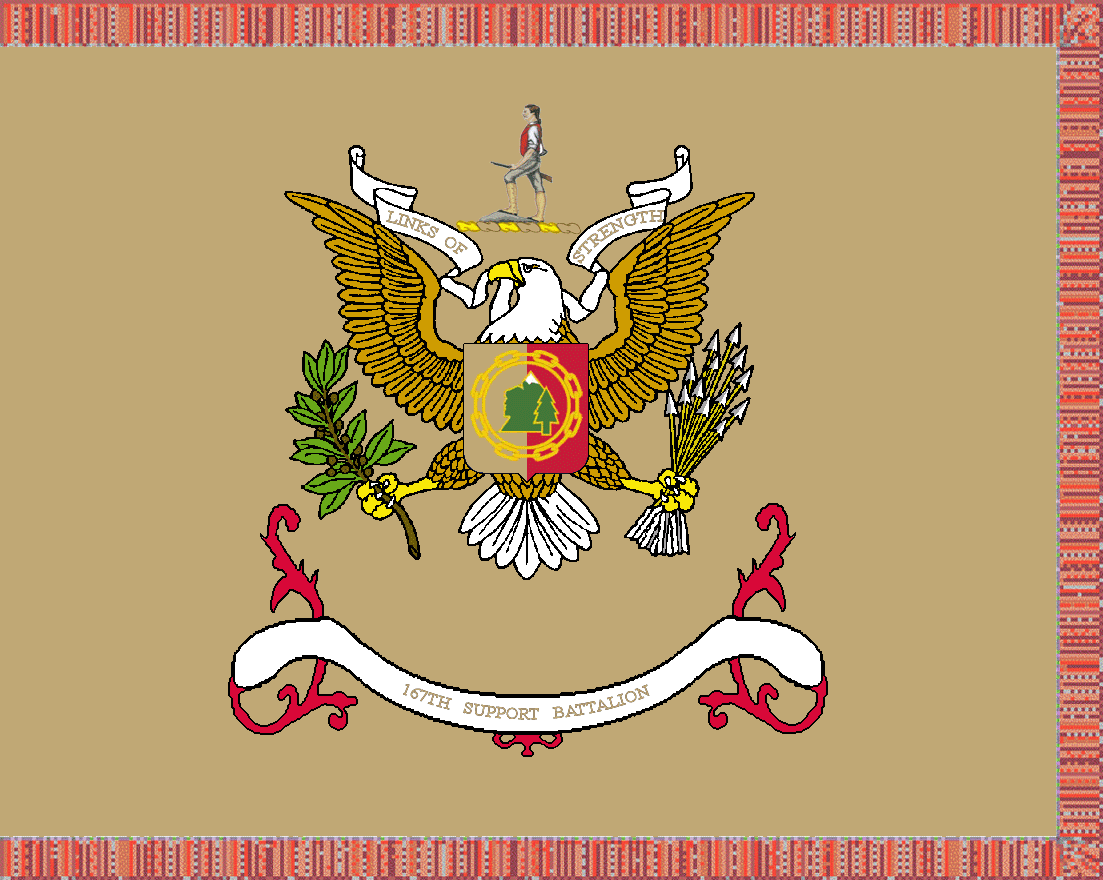
- 167th Support Battalion color

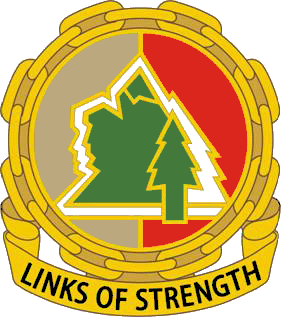
- Distinctive Unit Insignia

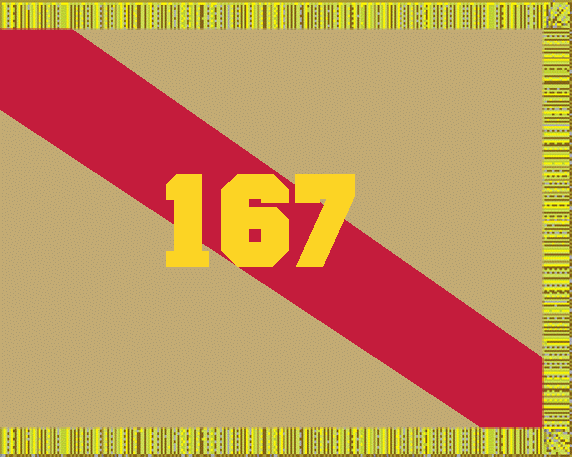
- 167th Support Group color

The 167th Combat Sustainment Support Battalion is a support battalion of the United States Army Reserve based at Londonderry, New Hampshire. The battalion is now subordinate to the 655th Regional Support Group of the 316th Sustainment Command (Expeditionary).

Activated in 1971 as the 167th Support Group (Corps), it was reorganised as a battalion in 2006. The 167th is a logistical support battalion capable of a variety of actions, capable of independent operations and taking on subordinate units to fulfill a larger scale sustainment operation for the United States Army.

== Organization ==
- 167th Combat Sustainment Support Battalion, in Londonderry (NH)
  - Headquarters and Headquarters Company, 167th Combat Sustainment Support Battalion, in Londonderry (NH)
  - 220th Transportation Medium Truck Company (POL, 5K GAL) (EAB Linehaul), in Keene (NH)
  - 308th Quartermaster Company (Petroleum Support), at Fort Devens (MA)
  - 619th Transportation Medium Truck Company (Cargo) (EAB Linehaul), in Auburn (ME)
    - Detachment 1, 619th Transportation Medium Truck Company (Cargo) (EAB Linehaul), in Dexter (ME)

Abbreviations: POL — Petroleum Oil Lubricants; EAB — Echelon Above Brigade

== History ==
Established at Grenier Field U.S. Army Reserve Center, on Galaxy Way, on the grounds of Manchester-Boston Regional Airport (the former Grenier Air Force Base), the 167th Support Group used a nominal Manchester, New Hampshire postal address, although that portion of the airport was on the Londonderry side of the city boundary.

In 1980, the peacetime Army Reserve chain of command was overlaid with a CAPSTONE wartime trace. In an expansion of the roundout and affiliation program begun ten years earlier, CAPSTONE purported to align every Army Reserve unit with the active and reserve component units with which they were anticipated to deploy. Like other Army Reserve units, the 167th Support Group maintained lines of communication with the units – often hundreds or thousands of miles away in peacetime – who would presumably serve above or below them in the event of mobilization. This communication, in some cases, extended to coordinated annual training opportunities.

Many of the 167th's units and individual soldiers rotated through Honduras in the 1980s. Operation Fuertes Caminos ("strong roads") provided villagers with roads on which to move their crops to market, while providing invaluable real-world training and experience to reserve engineers, medical personnel, logisticians and others.

Operation Nordic Shield was held in the summer of 1987. Units of the 94th Army Reserve Command; principally the 167th Support Group, the 187th Infantry Brigade (Separate), and their subordinate battalions and companies; deployed to Canadian Forces Base Gagetown in southern New Brunswick, to simulate the defense of Iceland against Warsaw Pact forces, the CAPSTONE mission of both the 187th and 167th.

Units under the 167th participated in a series of mobilization exercises in the 1980s, including the Selected Reserve Call-Up (23–25 October 1987), Golden Thrust '88 (November 1988), and Proud Eagle 90 (12 October through 2 November 1989). Each of these was designed to evaluate not only the units' ability to prepare to mobilize, but to examine the mobilization processes, systems, and logistical coordination so as to find and correct the unanticipated flaws.

In 1990–1991, many of the soldiers from the 167th Support Group's units were called to active duty and served both domestically and overseas in support of Operation Desert Shield and Desert Storm. Despite the commonly held belief that CAPSTONE traces were set in stone, the process of selecting units to mobilize and deploy largely ignored CAPSTONE.

Operation Nordic Shield II was held in the summer of 1992. As they did five years before, the 167th Support Group, 187th Infantry Brigade and other units of the 94th ARCOM deployed to Canadian Forces Base Gagetown in southern New Brunswick, to simulate the defense of Iceland against Warsaw Pact forces, the CAPSTONE mission of both the 187th and 167th. Part of the 1992 exercise included lanes training as part of the United States Army Forces Command's "Bold Shift" initiative to reinforce unit war-fighting task proficiency.

In the 1990s, the airport's expansion necessitated a land-swap between the airport authority and the federal government, resulting in a new Army Reserve Center being built on the south edge of the airport's periphery. Since relocating, the 167th and its co-located units use a Londonderry postal address.

The 167th Support Group deployed soldiers to Honduras and Guatemala in 1999 in support of Operation New Horizon.

== Global War on Terror ==
In 2003, the 167th Corps Support Group was mobilized in support of the Iraq War and deployed to the Persian Gulf in February 2004. In March 2004, the 167th deployed into Iraq, to FOB Speicher.

In 2006, the group was reorganised as a battalion.
