= 187th Infantry Brigade (United States) =

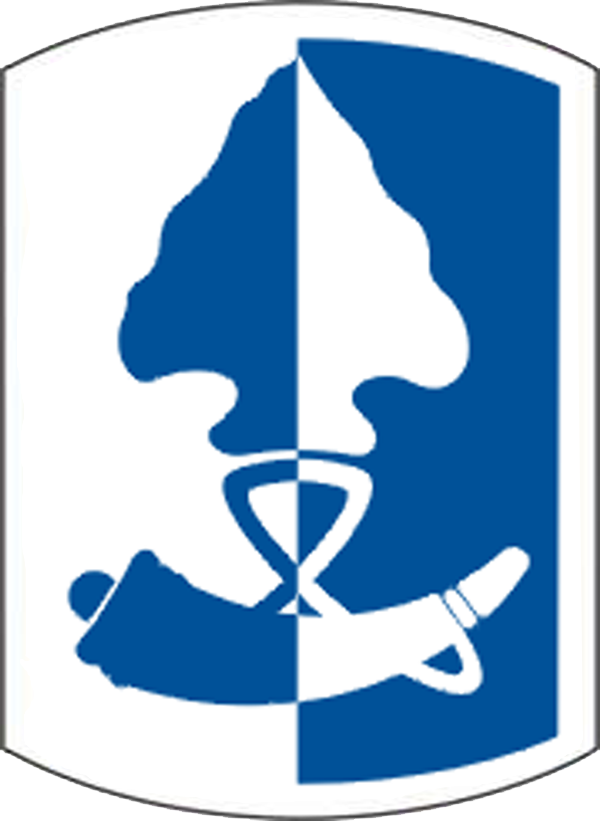
- Shoulder sleeve insignia
- Active: 24 June 1921–7 February 1946 (various designations); 25 March 1948–1 May 1959 (various designations); 5 November 1962–14 April 1994 (187th Infantry Bge.); 23 January 2007–17 May 2007
- Country: United States
- Branch: United States Army
- Type: Infantry
- Size: Brigade
- Part of: TRADOC
- Garrison/HQ: Fort Leonard Wood, Missouri
- Motto: The Ready Brigade
- Engagements: World War II; Northern France; Rhineland; Ardennes-Alsace; Central Europe

Insignia
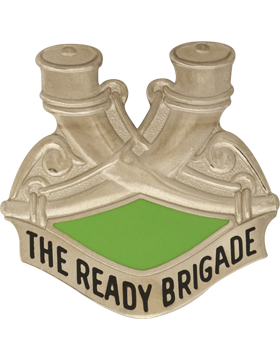
- Distinctive unit insignia

- Insignia of the 94th Infantry Division, worn 1921–1942

The 187th Infantry Brigade was an infantry brigade of the United States Army.

It was first organized in November 1921 as one of the two brigades under the United States Army Reserve's 94th Division (forerunner of the 94th Army Reserve Command).

The brigade was disbanded in February 1942 when the 94th Division was converted from a two brigade, four regiment "square" division to a three regiment "triangular" division.

== Cold War ==
The 94th Division was disbanded in the early 1960s, as part of continuing Army Reserve force reductions.

Thus to add flexibility to the force, and to preserve a general officer billet, the 187th Infantry Brigade was reactivated in the Army Reserve as a separate brigade on 7 January 1963 with headquarters in Boston, Massachusetts. From that year to 1994 it was one of only four (later three) combat Infantry brigades in the Army Reserve. As a separate brigade, the 187th wore its own shoulder patch rather than the 94th Division patch its members had previously worn.

Cold War plans called for the brigade to deploy to Iceland as part of the Iceland Defense Force if a confrontation between NATO and the Soviet Union occurred.

The brigade's headquarters was relocated on 25 October 1971 to Wollaston, Massachusetts and on 13 July 1976 to Fort Devens, Massachusetts.

Costas Caraganis was the commanding general in 1963.

Leo J. Golash was appointed commanding general in 1974.

- Headquarters & Headquarters Company
- 3rd Battalion, 16th Infantry
- 3rd Battalion, 18th Infantry
- 3rd Battalion, 35th Infantry
- 5th Battalion, 5th Artillery
- 9th Battalion, 34th Armor (until 1968)
- 187th Support Battalion (Company A became 987th Personnel Service Company in 1990)
- 756th Engineer Company
- Troop D, 5th Cavalry

On 14 April 1994 the 187th Infantry Brigade was inactivated as part of the Army-wide post-Cold War reductions.

== Reactivation ==
The 187th Infantry Brigade was reactivated as an initial entry training unit at the U.S. Army Maneuver Support Center of Excellence, Fort Leonard Wood, Missouri on 23 January 2007 from the 3rd Training Brigade and inactivated on 17 May 2007. The subordinate units were reassigned to the 3rd Chemical Brigade.

Its subordinate battalions were as follows:

- Headquarters & Headquarters Company
- 2nd Battalion, 10th Infantry Regiment
- 3rd Battalion, 10th Infantry Regiment
- 1st Battalion, 48th Infantry Regiment
- 43rd Adjutant General Battalion
