= 80 =

80 may refer to:

- 80 (number), the natural number following 79 and preceding 81
- one of the years 80 BC, AD 80, 1980, 2080, 2180
- B. B. King & Friends: 80, an album released in 2005
- 80 (Tolis Voskopoulos album), released in 1980
- "80", a song by Green Day from their 1991 album Kerplunk!
- 80 Sappho, a main-belt asteroid
- The Eighty (Vichy France), a group of French parliamentarians who opposed the dissolution of the Third Republic

== Vehicles ==
- Tatra 80, a full-size luxury car
- Audi 80, a compact executive car
- Rover 80, a saloon
- Sunbeam-Talbot 80, a sports saloon and drophead coupé
- Hillman 80, an executive car
- Boeing 80, a late-1920s Boeing aircraft

== See also ==
- 80th (disambiguation)
- List of highways numbered 80
