= Harry J. Malony =

U.S. Army Major general

Harry James Malony
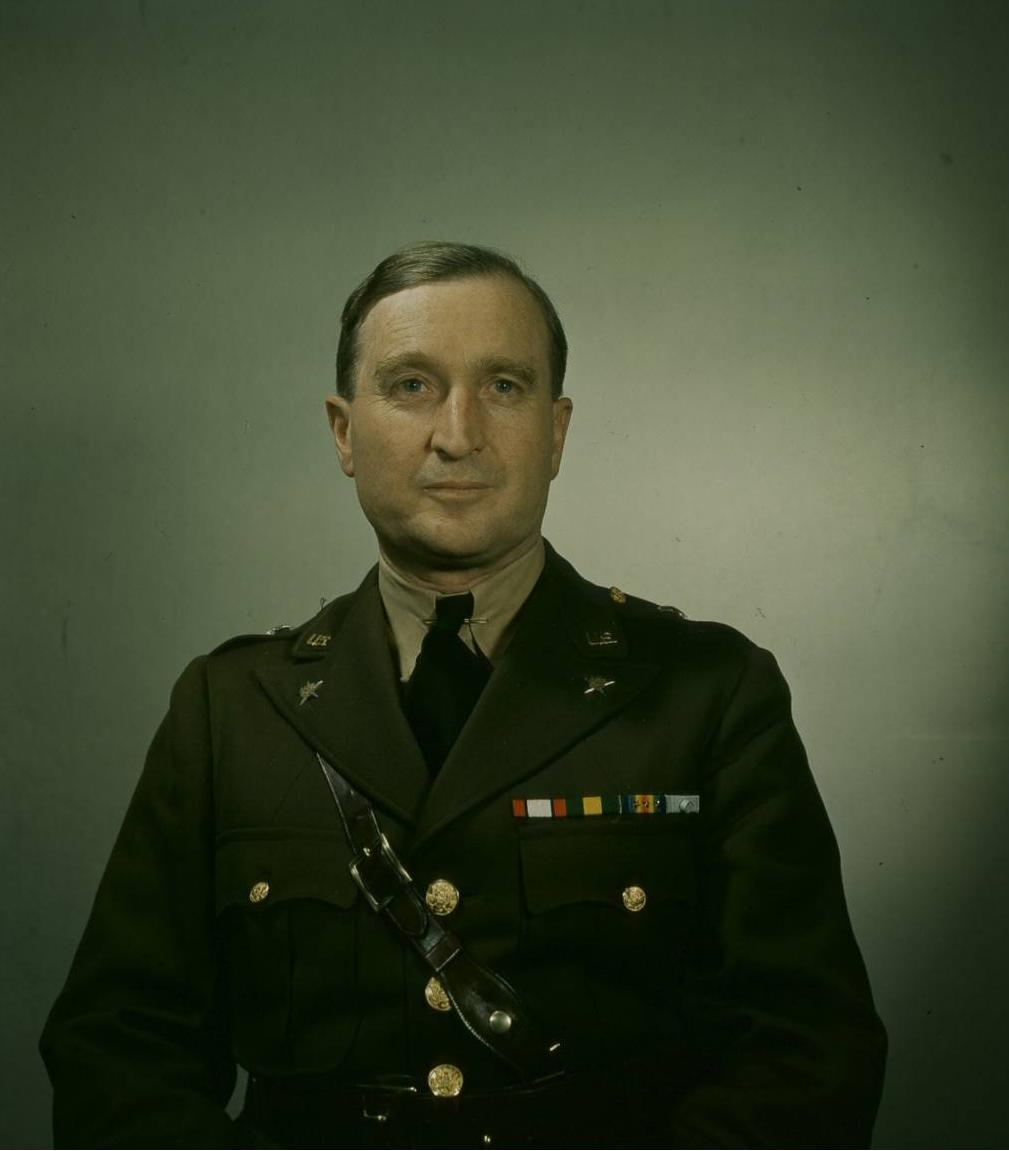
- Official portrait, c. 1941
- Born: August 24, 1889; Lakemont, New York, United States
- Died: March 23, 1971 (aged 81); Washington, D.C., United States
- Burial place: Arlington National Cemetery, Virginia, United States
- Military career
- Allegiance: United States
- Branch: United States Army
- Service years: 1912−1949
- Rank: Major General
- Service number: 0-3385
- Unit: Infantry Branch
- Commands: 94th Infantry Division
- Conflicts: Pancho Villa Expedition; World War I World War II
- Awards: Army Distinguished Service Medal (2); Silver Star; Bronze Star

Major General Harry James Malony (August 24, 1889 – March 23, 1971) was a decorated United States Army officer who, after seeing distinguished service overseas on the Western Front during World War I, commanded the 94th Infantry Division throughout most of World War II.

== Early years ==
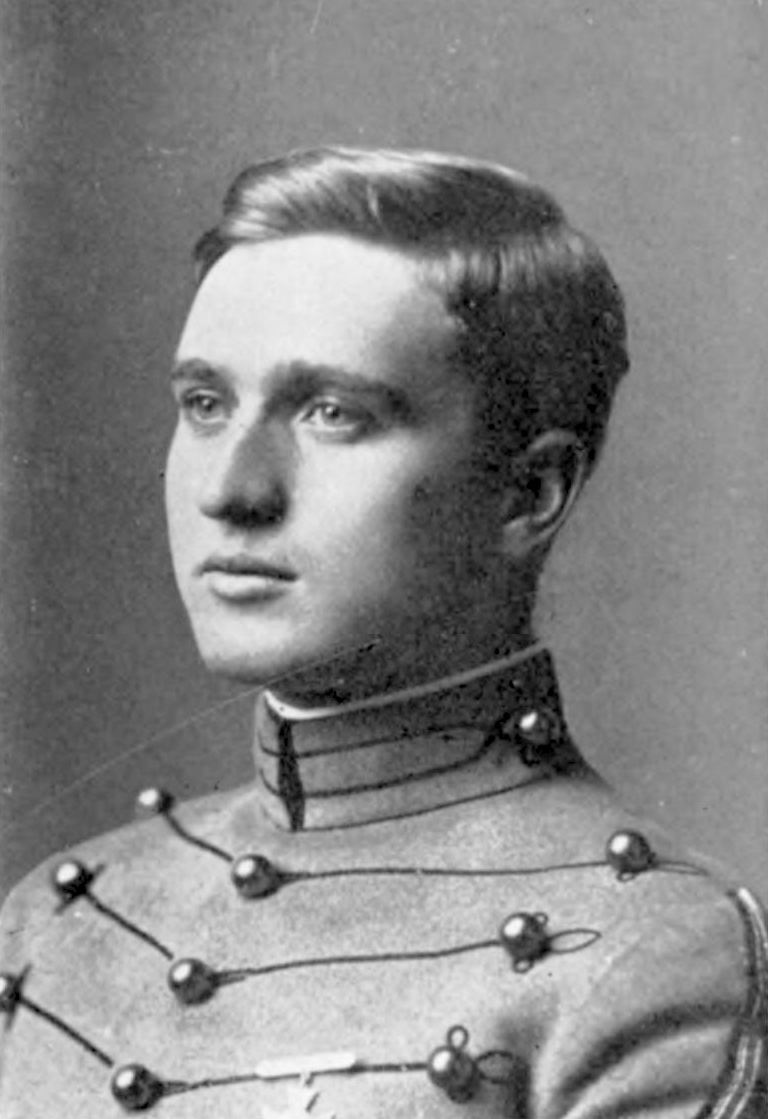
At West Point in 1912

Harry James Malony was born on August 24, 1889, in Lakemont, New York. Malony ttended the United States Military Academy at West Point, New York. He graduated and was commissioned a second lieutenant in the infantry on June 12, 1912.

He was then assigned to the 10th Infantry Regiment, which was stationed near the Mexican Border. With the American entry into World War I in April 1917, Malony was assigned to the 12th Field Artillery Regiment, but after a short time, he was ordered to France as part of the American Expeditionary Forces (AEF), where he was appointed the Head of the Aircraft Armament Section at Air Service Headquarters. For his leadership of this unit, Malony was awarded with his first Army Distinguished Service Medal and also the Order of the Black Star in the Grade of Officer by the Government of France. The citation for his Army DSM reads:

The President of the United States of America, authorized by Act of Congress, July 9, 1918, takes pleasure in presenting the Army Distinguished Service Medal to Lieutenant Colonel (Ordnance Corps) Harry James Malony, United States Army, for exceptionally meritorious and distinguished services to the Government of the United States, in a duty of great responsibility during World War I. Lieutenant Colonel Malony successfully organized and administered the many complex and difficult operations connected with the arming and equipping of airplanes for service at the front, displaying sound judgment and acting with energy and initiative in times of emergency. He worked self-sacrificing and devotedly that there might be no delays, overcoming serious obstacles by the exercise of good judgment and through understanding of conditions in the American Expeditionary Forces.

== Between the wars ==
In the interwar period, Malony served in the various Artillery assignments, including service at Madison Barracks, Fort Sill or Fort McPherson. At the last mentioned installation, Malony served for almost four years as a Staff officer within 4th Coast Artillery Regiment.

Malony also attended the Command and General Staff College at Fort Leavenworth, Kansas from August 1925 to June 1926. In June 1931, Malony was appointed the professor of Military Science & Tactics at University of Oklahoma. In 1935, he attended the Army War College and subsequently became a Member of the Field Artillery Board.

In 1937, Malony was transferred back to the Army War College, where he was appointed an instructor. He subsequently served a brief period attached to the War Plans Division at War Department General Staff.

In September 1940, Malony was assigned to the Greenslade-Denver's board, which solved the Selection of Naval Bases in British Trans-Atlantic possessions. He subsequently became a member of the President's Base Lease Commission, which negotiated acquisition of Atlantic Bases. He was also promoted to the rank of brigadier general on January 29, 1941.

== World War II ==
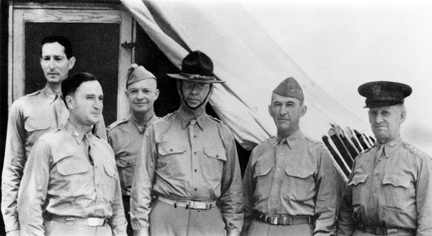
Senior officers during the Louisiana maneuvers. Left to right: Mark W. Clark, Chief of Staff, Army Ground Forces; Harry J. Malony, Chief of Staff, Second Army; Dwight D. Eisenhower, Chief of Staff, Third Army; Ben Lear, Commander Second Army; Walter Krueger, Commander Third Army; Lesley J. McNair, Commander Army Ground Forces.

He completed the tour in the United Kingdom during the negotiation of Atlantic Bases and was attached to the War Department in Washington, D.C., where he was appointed Assistant Chief of Staff for Operations (G-3). He headed the operations sections until the beginning of March 1942, when he was attached to the Munitions Assignment Board for a brief period. Malony was promoted to the rank of major general in July 1942 and appointed commanding general of the newly activated 94th Infantry Division at Fort Custer, Michigan. He directed division's training until the beginning of August 1944, when he sailed for Europe. Throughout this period his assistant division commander (ADC) was Brigadier General Henry B. Cheadle

Following a brief stay in England, the 94th landed on Utah Beach, France on D-Day + 94, September 8, 1944, and moved into Brittany to relieve the 6th Armored Division and assume responsibility for containing some 60,000 German troops besieged in their garrisons at the Channel ports of Lorient and Saint-Nazaire. The 94th inflicted over 2,700 casualties on the enemy and took 566 prisoners before being relieved by the 66th Infantry Division on New Year's Day 1945.

Malony subsequently led the 94th Division during the combats in the Ardennes in Belgium in early 1945. His participated in the combats on the Siegfried Line and secured the area from Orscholz and Saarburg to the confluence of the Saar and Moselle Rivers by February 21, 1945. Malony and 94th Division reached the Rhine on March 21, where it fought in the Battle for Ludwigshafen. Ludwigshafen was taken on March 24, in conjunction with Combat Command A of the 12th Armored Division.

By April 3, Malony commanded his division during the assuming responsibility for containing the western side of the Ruhr Pocket from positions along the Rhine. With the reduction of the pocket in mid-April, the division was assigned military government duties, first in the Krefeld and later in the Düsseldorf areas. From mid-June, the division served the military government in Czechoslovakia and Malony was transferred to the United Kingdom at the end of June 1945 for duty with Munitions Assignment Board.

For his service with 94th Infantry Division during the European campaign, Malony was decorated with his second Army Distinguished Service Medal, Silver Star and Bronze Star Medal. He also received Legion of Honor, rank Officer and Croix de guerre 1939-1945 with Palm by the Government of France and Belgian Croix de guerre 1940-1945 with Palm.

== Postwar life ==
In November 1945, Malony was assigned as a Representative on International Group to observe Greek elections and stayed in this capacity until May of the next year. He was subsequently appointed a Director of the Historical Division within Department of the Army and served in this capacity until March 31, 1949, when he finally retired from the Army. He was succeeded by Major General Orlando Ward.

Major General Harry James Malony died on March 23, 1971, in Washington, D.C., at the age of 81 and is buried together with his wife Dorothy Fitch Thurman Malony (1893–1984) in Arlington National Cemetery, Virginia.

== Decorations ==
Here is the ribbon bar of Major General Harry J. Malony:

| 1st Row | Army Distinguished Service Medal with Oak Leaf Cluster | Silver Star | | Bronze Star Medal |
| 2nd Row | Army Commendation Medal | Mexican Border Service Medal | World War I Victory Medal with three battle clasps | American Defense Service Medal |
| 3rd Row | American Campaign Medal | European-African-Middle Eastern Campaign Medal with four service stars | World War II Victory Medal | Army of Occupation Medal |
| 4th Row | Officer of the Legion of Honor (France) | Officer of the Order of the Black Star | French Croix de guerre 1939-1945 with Palm | Belgian Croix de guerre 1940-1945 with Palm |
Presidential Unit Citation

Military offices
| Preceded by Newly activated organization | Commanding General 94th Infantry Division; 1942–1945 | Succeeded by Louis J. Fortier |
