= Nicholas Oresko =

American soldier awarded Medal of Honor

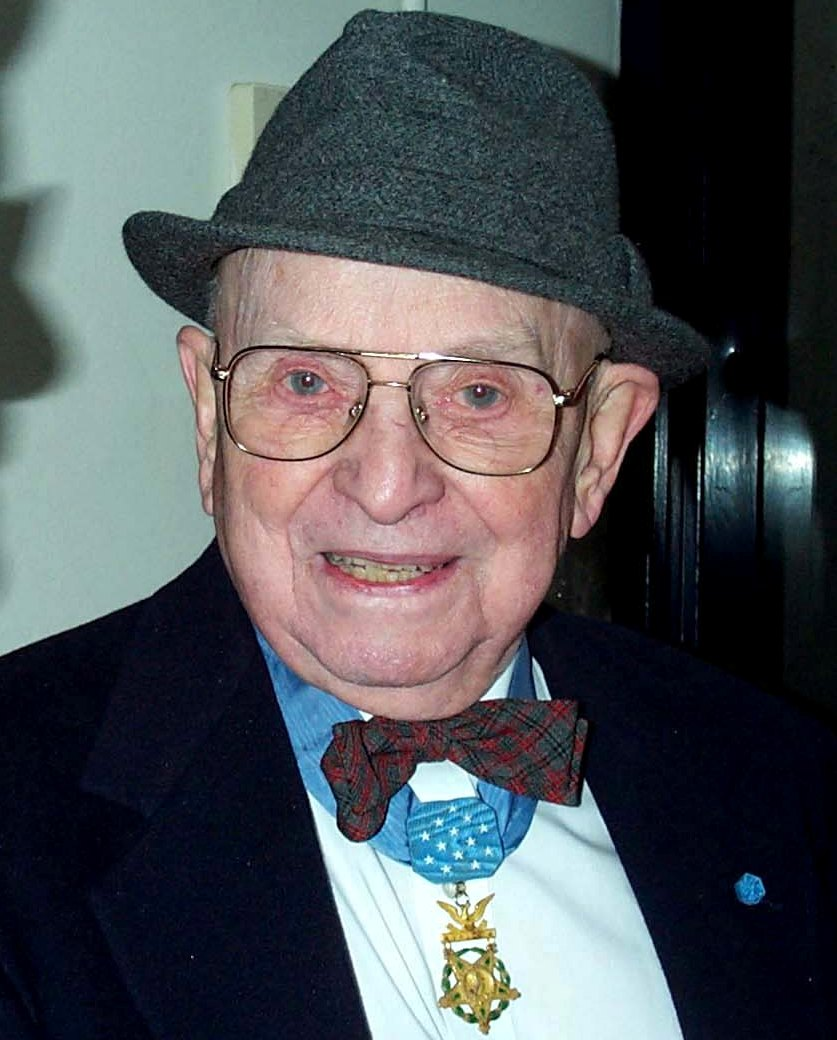
- Nicholas Oresko, Medal of Honor recipient, in 2001
- Born: January 18, 1917; Bayonne, New Jersey, U.S.
- Died: October 4, 2013 (aged 96); Englewood, New Jersey, U.S.
- Burial place: George Washington Memorial Park, Paramus, New Jersey
- Military career
- Allegiance: United States of America
- Branch: United States Army
- Service years: 1942–1945
- Rank: Master Sergeant
- Units: 302nd Infantry Regiment, 94th Infantry Division
- Conflicts: World War II
- Awards: Medal of Honor; Bronze Star Medal; Purple Heart

Nicholas Oresko (January 18, 1917 – October 4, 2013) was an American combat veteran of World War II who received the Medal of Honor for his valorous actions in Germany on January 23, 1945.

== Biography ==
Oresko was born in Bayonne, New Jersey on January 18, 1917. He came from an ethnic Ukrainian family. Oresko graduated from Bayonne High School.

=== World War II ===
He joined the US Army in March 1942. He was sent to Europe and arrived in France in September 1944, three months after the Normandy landings. A platoon sergeant in Company C, 1st Battalion, 302nd Infantry Regiment, 94th Infantry Division, he spent the next several months with his unit mopping up pockets of German soldiers who had been bypassed in the Allies' initial push through the northern part of France. In December 1944, the 94th Division was redeployed to replace the 90th Infantry Division as part of General Patton's Third Army. The 94th Division assumed positions opposite the Westwall and the German's 11th Panzer Division.

On January 23, 1945, near Tettingen, Germany, Master Sergeant Oresko single-handedly and under enemy fire, took out a German bunker position that was armed with a machine gun. Seriously wounded by another enemy machine gun from another bunker, he attacked that bunker under fire and destroyed that enemy position. Nine months later on October 30, 1945, he was awarded the Medal of Honor. President Harry Truman formally presented Oresko the medal during a ceremony at the White House.

=== Death ===
A resident of Cresskill, New Jersey, Oresko died at Englewood Hospital and Medical Center on October 4, 2013, after suffering complications from surgery for a broken femur. He was 96 years old.

== Medal of Honor citation ==
Master Sergeant Oresko's official Medal of Honor citation reads:

M/Sgt. Oresko was a platoon leader with Company C, in an attack against strong enemy positions. Deadly automatic fire from the flanks pinned down his unit. Realizing that a machinegun in a nearby bunker must be eliminated, he swiftly worked ahead alone, braving bullets which struck about him, until close enough to throw a grenade into the German position. He rushed the bunker and, with pointblank rifle fire, killed all the hostile occupants who survived the grenade blast. Another machinegun opened up on him, knocking him down and seriously wounding him in the hip. Refusing to withdraw from the battle, he placed himself at the head of his platoon to continue the assault. As withering machinegun and rifle fire swept the area, he struck out alone in advance of his men to a second bunker. With a grenade, he crippled the dug-in machinegun defending this position and then wiped out the troops manning it with his rifle, completing his second self-imposed, 1-man attack. Although weak from loss of blood, he refused to be evacuated until assured the mission was successfully accomplished. Through quick thinking, indomitable courage, and unswerving devotion to the attack in the face of bitter resistance and while wounded, M/Sgt. Oresko killed 12 Germans, prevented a delay in the assault, and made it possible for Company C to obtain its objective with minimum casualties.

== Awards and decorations ==

Badge	Combat Infantryman Badge		
1st row	Medal of Honor		
2nd row	Bronze Star Medal	Purple Heart	Army Good Conduct Medal
3rd row	American Campaign Medal	European–African–Middle Eastern Campaign Medal with 2 Campaign stars	World War II Victory Medal

== Other honors ==
In 2015, the Ukrainian Institute of National Memory produced posters depicting ten outstanding Ukrainians who fought during World War II. Among them was Nicholas Oresko.

In September 2017, an Army Reserve Army School System Building at Fort Lee, VA was named in his honor.

On May 9, 2020, Oresko was mentioned in a speech by President of Ukraine Volodymyr Zelenskyy commemorating Victory Day over Nazism in World War II.

== See also ==
- List of Medal of Honor recipients for World War II
