= 3rd Chemical Brigade =

- 3rd Chemical Brigade shoulder sleeve insignia
- Active: 1942–present
- Country: United States
- Branch: United States Army
- Type: Chemical
- Role: Training
- Size: Brigade
- Part of: U.S. Army Maneuver Support Center of Excellence
- Garrison/HQ: Fort Leonard Wood, Missouri
- Nickname: "Army's Forge"
- Motto: "Bring The Heat"

Commanders
- Current commander: COL Hector A. Montemayor
- Command Sergeant Major: Ronis J. Gutierrez

Insignia
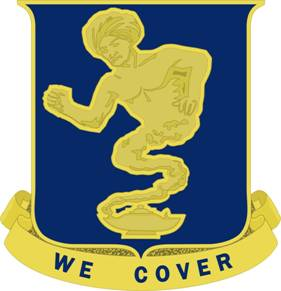
- 3rd Chemical Brigade DUI

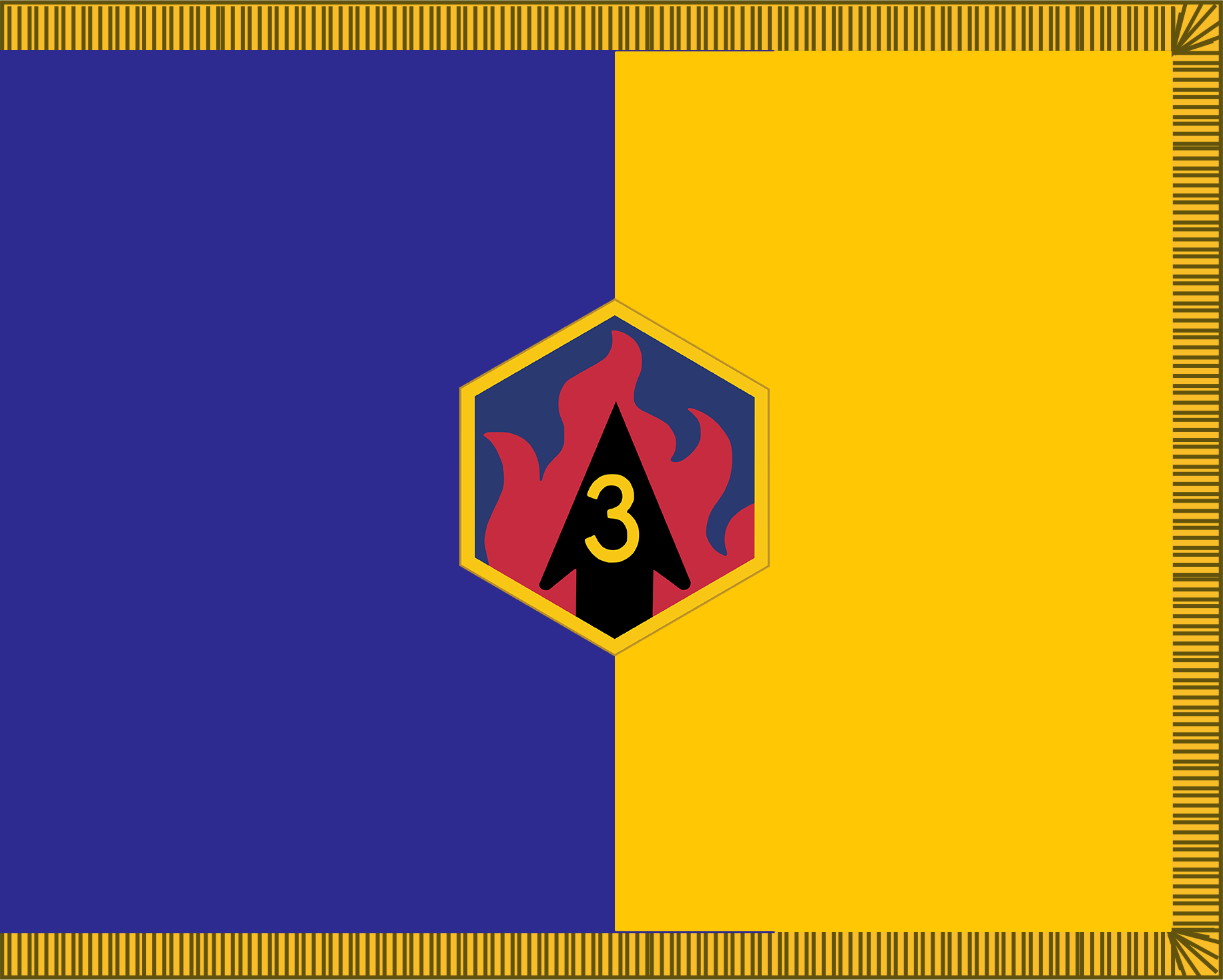
- 3rd Chemical Brigade Flag

The 3rd Chemical Brigade is a training brigade of the United States Army based at Fort Leonard Wood, Missouri, that conducts Initial Entry Training (IET), Chemical, Biological, Radiological and Nuclear (CBRN) advanced officer courses, and live CBRN defense training while retaining for historic reasons its name.

== Organization ==
3rd Chemical Brigade

- Headquarters and Headquarters Battery
- 1st Battalion, 48th Infantry Regiment (Basic Combat Training)
- 2nd Battalion, 10th Infantry Regiment (Basic Combat Training)
- 3rd Battalion, 10th Infantry Regiment (Basic Combat Training)
- 58th Transportation Battalion (Transportation Training)
- 84th Chemical Battalion (CBRN Training)

== History ==
The 3rd Chemical Brigade was first constituted on 1 January 1942 as the 3rd Chemical Battalion. It was activated at Fort Benning, Georgia.

The unit was reorganized and redesignated as the 3rd Chemical Mortar Battalion on 11 March 1945. It was inactivated on 2 January 1946 at Camp Patrick Henry, Virginia.

The unit reactivated at Fort Bragg, North Carolina on 18 September 1950, but again inactivated there on 5 February 1953. On 20 September 1989, the unit was disbanded.

The unit reconstituted on 1 October 1999 in the Regular Army and was redesignated as 3rd Chemical Brigade. Command of the unit was transferred to the United States Army Training and Doctrine Command, and activated at Fort Leonard Wood, Missouri.

== Campaign participation credit ==
World War II

- Sicily (with arrowhead)
- Naples-Foggia
- Rome-Arno
- Southern France (with arrowhead)
- Rhineland
- Ardennes-Alsace
- Central Europe
