= 80th Regiment =

80th Regiment or 80th Infantry Regiment may refer to:

- 80th Regiment of Foot (Royal Edinburgh Volunteers), a unit of the British Army, 1778–1783
- 80th Regiment of Foot (Staffordshire Volunteers), a unit of the British Army
- 80th Airmobile Regiment (Ukraine), a unit of the Ukrainian Army
- 80th Infantry Regiment (Imperial Japanese Army), a unit of the Japanese Army
- 80th Training Regiment (United States) a unit of the United States Army Reserve

American Civil War regiments

- 80th Illinois Volunteer Infantry Regiment, a unit of the Union (North) Army
- 80th Indiana Infantry Regiment, a unit of the Union (North) Army
- 80th New York Volunteer Infantry Regiment, a unit of the Union (North) Army
- 80th Ohio Infantry, a unit of the Union (North) Army
- 80th United States Colored Infantry Regiment, a unit of the Union Army in Louisiana

== See also ==
- 80th Division (disambiguation)
- 80 Squadron (disambiguation)
