= 80th Division =

In military terms, 80th Division or 80th Infantry Division may refer to:

== Infantry divisions ==
- 80th Division (People's Republic of China)
- 80th Reserve Division, German Empire
- 80th Division (Israel)
- 80th Infantry Division "La Spezia", Italy
- 80th Infantry Division (Russian Empire)
- 80th Guards Rifle Division, Soviet Union
- 80th Rifle Division, Soviet Union
- 80th Division (Syria)
- 80th Infantry (Reserve) Division, United Kingdom
- 80th Division (United States) (formerly 80th Airborne Division)

== See also ==
- List of military divisions by number
- 80th Brigade (disambiguation)
- 80th Regiment (disambiguation)
- 80th Squadron (disambiguation)
