= 80th Brigade =

80th Brigade may refer to:

== British India ==
- 80th Indian Infantry Brigade

== China ==
- 80th Motorized Infantry Brigade (People's Republic of China)

== Russia ==
- 80th Arctic Motor Rifle Brigade

== Spain ==
- 80th Mixed Brigade

== Ukraine ==
- 80th Air Assault Brigade (Ukraine)

== United Kingdom ==
- 80th Anti-Aircraft Brigade (United Kingdom), British Army artillery formation during World War II
- 80th Brigade (United Kingdom), British Army infantry formation during World War I
- 80th Brigade, Royal Field Artillery, British Army unit during World War I
- 80th (Lowland) Brigade, Royal Field Artillery, British Army unit after World War I

== See also ==
- 80th Division (disambiguation)
- 80th Regiment (disambiguation)
