= 80th Street =

80th Street may refer to:

- 80th Street (IND Fulton Street Line), a New York City Subway station in Queens, New York
- 80th Street (IRT Second Avenue Line), a former elevated train station in Manhattan, New York
- 80th Street (Manhattan)
- 80th Street-Eastwick station, a SEPTA trolley station in Philadelphia, Pennsylvania
