= Operation New Horizons =

Series of operations in Central and South America and the Caribbean Islands

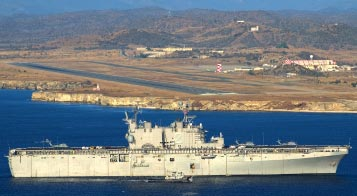
USS Saipan participates in Operation New Horizons in Haiti

Operation New Horizons is a series of recurring U.S.-led operations in Central and South America and the Caribbean Islands. It has had several names over the years, including New Horizons and Beyond the Horizons (as of 2008). U.S. Southern Command sponsors these operations and uses active duty, reserve and National Guard forces from throughout the United States to conduct the missions. The units involved focus on engineering type endeavors to enhance the infrastructure of a region by building schools, medical clinics and roads and similar projects. The units also conduct medical assistance by providing such support to an area. Joint Task Force Bravo coordinates a number of these activities. In addition, these operations often include non-military assistance, such as from the United States Agency for International Development and the United States Department of Agriculture.
