= 80th Training Regiment (United States) =

80th Regiment (Training)
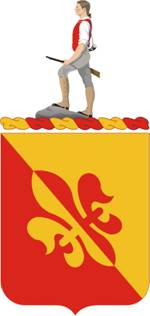
- Coat of arms
- Active: 1917–19; 1921–46; 1947 – present
- Country: United States
- Branch: U.S. Army
- Type: Training
- Part of: 80th Division(Institutional Training)
- Headquarters: Norfolk, Virginia
- Motto: Nunc Ut Olim (Now As Before)
- Branch color: Scarlet

Insignia
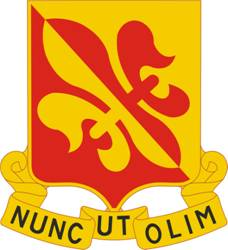
- Distinctive unit insignia

The 80th Training Regiment is a training unit of the 80th Training Command. Its battalions are assigned to several different training divisions of the command.

It was constituted August 5, 1917, in the National Army as Headquarters, 155th Field Artillery Brigade, and assigned to the 80th Division. The unit was organized September 1917 at Camp Lee, Virginia.

== Heraldic items ==
=== Coat of arms ===
==== Blazon ====
- Shield: Per bend Or and Gules a fleur-de-lis in bend counterchanged.
- Crest:
1. That for the regiments and separate battalions of the Army Reserve: On a wreath of the colors Or and Gules the Lexington Minute Man Proper. The statue of the Minute Man, Captain John Parker (H.H. Kitson, sculptor) stands on the Common in Lexington, Massachusetts.
- Motto:NUNC UT OLIM (Now As Before).

==== Symbolism ====
- Shield:
1. Scarlet is the color of Artillery.
2. The fleur-de-lis represents service in France in World War I.
3. The martial aspect of the organization is symbolized by the diagonal division of the shield, representing the heraldic bend, which anciently denoted the scarf of a military commander.
- Crest: The crest is that of the U.S. Army Reserve.
- Motto: The motto translates to “Now As Before” and is appropriate to the expectation of a continuance of the past record.

==== Background ====
1. The coat of arms was originally approved for 905th Field Artillery Battalion, Organized Reserve on February 26, 1943.
2. It was redesignated for the 80th Regiment, Army Reserve on August 16, 1960.
3. It was amended to correct the motto on June 19, 1968.

=== Distinctive unit insignia ===
- Description:
1. A Gold color metal and enamel device 1 1/16 inches (2.70 cm) in height consisting of a shield blazoned: Per bend Or and Gules a fleur-de-lis in bend counterchanged.
2. Attached below the shield a Gold scroll inscribed “NUNC UT OLIM” in Black letters.
- Symbolism:
1. Scarlet is the color of Artillery.
2. The fleur-de-lis represents service in France in World War I.
3. The martial aspect of the organization is symbolized by the diagonal division of the shield, representing the heraldic bend, which anciently denoted the scarf of a military commander.
4. The motto translates to “Now As Before” and is appropriate to the expectation of a continuance of the past record.
- Background:
1. The distinctive unit insignia was originally approved for 905th Field Artillery Battalion, Organized Reserve on February 26, 1943.
2. It was redesignated for the 80th Regiment, Army Reserve on August 16, 1960. It was amended to correct the motto on June 19, 1968.

== Lineage ==
- Constituted August 5, 1917, in the National Army as Headquarters, 155th Field Artillery Brigade, and assigned to the 80th Division.
- Organized September 1917 at Camp Lee, Virginia.
- Demobilized June 2, 1919, at Camp Lee, Virginia
- Reconstituted June 24, 1921, in the Organized Reserves as Headquarters and Headquarters Battery, 155th Field Artillery Brigade, and assigned to the 80th Division
- Organized in December 1922 at Washington, D.C.
- Reorganized and redesignated February 12, 1942, as Headquarters and Headquarters Battery, 80th Division Artillery
- Ordered into active military service July 15, 1942, and reorganized at Camp Forrest, Tennessee.
- Moved to the Tennessee Maneuver Area on June 23, 1943, where they participated in the Second Army #2 Tennessee Maneuvers.
- Arrived at Camp Phillips, Kansas, on September 8, 1943.
- Moved to Desert Training Center on December 9, 1943, for #4 California Maneuvers.
- Moved to Camp Dix, New Jersey, on March 20, 1944.
- Staged at Camp Kilmer, New Jersey, on June 23, 1944, until they departed the New York Port of Embarkation on June 1, 1944
- Arrived in England on July 7, 1944.
- Assigned to XII Corps on August 1, 1944.
- Deployed forward to France on August 3, 1944, and engaged in Northern France Campaign.
- Reassigned to XX Corps on August 7, 1944.
- Reassigned to XV Corps on August 8, 1944.
- Reassigned to XX Corps on August 10, 1944.
- Attached to V Corps on August 17, 1944.
- Reassigned to Third Army on August 23, 1944.
- Reassigned to XII Corps on August 26, 1944.
- Northern France Campaign concluded on September 14, 1944.
- Rhineland Campaign commenced on September 15, 1944
- Unit disengaged from Rhineland Campaign and moved to Ardennes-Alsace Campaign on December 16, 1944.
- Unit reassigned to III Corps on December 19, 1944
- Unit entered Luxembourg on December 20, 1944.
- Unit reassigned to XII Corps on December 26, 1944.
- Ardennes-Alsace Campaign concluded on January 25, 1945. Unit returned to Rhineland Campaign.
- Unit entered Germany on February 18, 1945.
- Reassigned to XX Corps March 10, 1945.
- Rhineland Campaign concluded on March 21, 1945.
- Central Europe Campaign commenced on March 22, 1945.
- Unit entered Austria on May 5, 1945.
- Central Europe Campaign concluded on May 11, 1945.
- Unit was at Pichlwany, Austria on August 14, 1945.
- Unit returned to New York Port of Embarkation on January 3, 1946.
- Inactivated January 5, 1946, at Camp Kilmer, New Jersey.
- Redesignated July 15, 1946, as Headquarters and Headquarters Battery, 80th Airborne Division Artillery
- Activated March 12, 1947, in the Organized Reserves at Richmond, Virginia.
- Organized Reserves redesignated March 25, 1948, as the Organized Reserve Corps.
- Reorganized and redesignated June 10, 1952, as Headquarters and Headquarters Battery, 80th Division Artillery.
- Organized Reserve Corps redesignated July 9, 1952, as the Army Reserve.
- Reorganized and redesignated March 6, 1959, as Headquarters and Headquarters Company, 80th Regiment, an element of the 80th Division (Training), and location changed to Norfolk, Virginia. Organic elements concurrently organized as new units.
- Regiment reorganized January 31, 1968, to consist of the 1st and 2nd Battalions, elements of the 80th Division (Training).
- Reorganized April 1, 1971, to consist of the 1st, 2nd, and 3rd Battalions, elements of the 80th Division (Training).
- Reorganized October 1, 1994, to consist of the 1st, 2nd, and 3d Battalions, elements of the 80th Division (Institutional Training).
- Reorganized January 13, 1995, to consist of the 1st and 2nd Battalions, elements of the 80th Division (Institutional Training).
- Reorganized serially between October 16, 1996, and November 16, 1996, to consist of the 1st, 2nd, 3rd, 4th, 5th, 6th, 7th, 8th, 9th, 10th, and 11th Battalions, elements of the 80th Division (Institutional Training).

== Honors ==
=== Campaign participation credit ===
- World War I:
1. Meuse-Argonne
- World War II:
1. Northern France;
2. Rhineland;
3. Ardennes-Alsace,
4. Central Europe.
