= 80 Squadron =

80 Squadron or 80th Squadron may refer to:

- No. 80 Squadron RAAF, a unit of the Royal Australian Air Force
- No. 80 Squadron RAF, a former unit of the Royal Air Force
- 80th UAV Squadron (Belgium), a unit of the Belgian Air Force
- 80th Aero Squadron, a unit of the Air Service, United States Army
- 80th Fighter Squadron, a unit of the United States Air Force
