= List of Axis operational codenames in the European Theatre =

The list of Axis named operations in the European Theatre represents those military operations that received a codename, predominantly from the Wehrmacht commands. It does not represent all operations that were carried out by the Axis powers, or their allies in the European Theatre during the Second World War. Although named operations, the entries represent activities that spanned the entire theatre or large parts of it, multi-year campaigns, battles, engagements and even combat that resulted in relatively small actions by armed forces.

== Pre-war operations ==
- Fall Blau 1935 - German defence planning on the eastern border, simultaneously with Fall Rot
- Fall Rot 1935 - German defence planning on the western border, simultaneously with Fall Blau
- Operation Feuerzauber 1936–1939 - German transfer of weapons and personnel to Francisco Franco's forces in the Spanish Civil War
- Operation Ursula 1936–1939 - German submarine operation in support of Francisco Franco's naval forces during the Spanish Civil War
- Operation Bodden 1937–1943 - German Abwehr intelligence gathering system in Spain and Morocco
- Fall Richard 1937 - German contingency planning for Soviet takeover of Spain
- Fall Rot 1937 - German planned invasion of France
- Operation Rügen 1937 - German bombing of Guernica, Spain
- Fall Blau 1938 - German air force research; later renamed Planstudie 39
- Fall Grün 1938 - German plan for invasion of Czechoslovakia
- Operation Otto 1938 - German plan for the annexation of Austria

== 1939 ==
- Operation A-Bewegung 1939 - German preparation for the invasion of Poland; part of Fall Weiss
- Operation Blitzableiter 1939–1945 - German bacteriological weapons research
- Operation Dirschau 1939 - German operation to safeguard the rail bridge at Tczew (German: Dirschau), Poland during the invasion
- Fall Rot 1939 - German planned invasion of France
- Fall Weiss 1939 - German invasion of Poland. German bombing of Wieluń, Poland; part of Fall Weiss
- Operation Himmler 1939 - German staged attacks in Poland to justify invasion; part of Fall Weiss
- Operation Nordwest 1939 - German study for a potential invasion of Britain; parts of Operation Nordwest were integrated into Operation Seelöwe
- Operation Ost 1939 - German operation in Southern Poland near the border with Czechoslovakia
- Plan Z 1939 - German plan to expand the Kriegsmarine to match the strength of the British Royal Navy
- Planstudie 39 1939 - German air force research
- Operation Sonderaktion Krakau 1939 - German operation to murder members of the intelligentsia at universities in Kraków, Poland
- Operation Tannenberg 1939 - German plan to exterminate Polish intelligentsia
- Operation Wasserkante 1939 - German aerial bombing of Warsaw, Poland

== 1940 ==
- Operation Adler 1940 - German attacks on the British Royal Air Force, aimed to soften up the defences for a future amphibious invasion; also known as Operation Adlerangriff
- Operation Alfred 1940 - German mining off Dover, England, using surface minelayers
- Operation Altenbeken 1940 - German attack on Åndalsnes, Norway; part of Operation Weserübung
- Operation Altona 1940 - German attack on Arendal, Norway; part of Operation Weserübung
- Operation Attila 1940–1942 - German occupation of Vichy France prior to Italian support in 1942
- Operation Aufbau Ost 1940 - German strategic preparations for Operation Barbarossa
- Operation B 1940 - German attack on the Maginot Line on the German-French border; part of Fall Rot
- Operation Bernhard 1940 - German mining off Dover, England
- Operation Biene 1940 - German attack on Alsten Island and Sandnessjøen, Norway; part of Operation Weserübung
- Operation Bremen 1940 - German attack in Norway; part of Operation Weserübung
- Operation Büffel 1940 - German air operation to relieve troops in Narvik, Norway
- Operation Eisen 1940 - German commando operation to occupy the bridge over the Albert Canal in Belgium
- Fall Braun 1940 - German attacks against the Maginot Line on the French-German border in conjunction with Fall Grün
- Fall Falke 1940 - German attacks against the Maginot Line on the French-German border; part of Fall Grün
- Fall Gelb 1940 - German invasion of the Low Countries of Belgium, the Netherlands, and Luxembourg
- Fall Grün 1940 - German attacks against the Maginot Line on the French-German border in conjunction with Fall Braun
- Fall Rot 1940 - German operation to defeat France after Dunkirk
- Operation Felix 1940 - German planned invasion of Gibraltar via the Iberian Peninsula
- Operation Festung 1940 - German airborne offensive on The Hague, Rotterdam, Dordrecht, and Moerdijk in the Netherlands; part of Fall Gelb
- Operation G 1940 - German airborne offensive on Ghent in the Netherlands; part of Fall Gelb
- Operation Geier 1940 - German attack of the Maginot Line on the French-Germany border north of Kehl, Germany; part of Fall Grün
- Operation Gneisenau 1940 - German diversionary attack on two bridges on the French-German border; part of Fall Grün
- Operation Granit 1940 - German airborne action on Belgian Fort Eben-Emael
- Fall Grün 1940 - German plan for a diversionary invasion of Ireland in support of Operation Seelöwe
- Operation Grüne Bewegung 1940 - German planned landing at Brighton, England; part of Operation Seelöwe
- Operation Grünpfeil 1940 - German occupation of the Channel Islands
- Operation Habicht 1940 - German diversionary attack on Mulhouse, France; part of Fall Grün
- Operation Hartmut 1940 - German submarine operations in Norwegian territorial waters
- Operation Herbstreise 1940 - German planned diversionary invasion of Scotland, Britain; part of Operation Seelöwe
- Operation Hummel 1940 - German intelligence gathering for operation Seelöwe
- Operation Hummer 1940–1945 - German infiltration of Britain
- Operation Ikarus 1940 - German planned invasion of Iceland in response to British Operation Fork; originally planned to launch in conjunction with Operation Seelöwe
- Operation Juno 1940 - German naval operation against British warships off Narvik, Norway
- Operation Karlshafen 1940 - German attack against Kristiansand, Norway; part of Operation Weserübung
- Operation Kathleen 1940 - German planned invasion of Ireland
- Operation Lichtermeer 1940 - German airfield attacks on British bomber airfields
- Operation Loge 1940 - German 65-day air offensive against London, England
- Operation Luchs 1940 - German planned breakthrough between Breisach and Strasbourg, France; part of Fall Grün
- Operation Lucie 1940 - German planned invasion of the Dutch island of Texel in the North Sea
- Operation Luftparade 1940 - German night raid on British air bases
- Operation Löwe 1940 - German planned invasion of Britain; precursor of Operation Seelöwe
- Operation Marianne 1940 - German motorboat action off Dover, England
- Operation Mittelmeer 1940–1941 - German reinforcement of the Italian Regia Aeronautica in the Mediterranean
- Operation Mondscheinsonate 1940 - German night raid on Coventry, England
- Operation Morgenröte 1940 - German attack on Dutch bridges
- Operation N 1940 - German airborne operation at Namur, Belgium
- Operation Naumburg 1940 - German landing at Narvik, Norway
- Operation Nebelübung 1940 - German planned invasion of Liège, Belgium; part of Fall Gelb
- Operation Nienburg 1940 - German action at Narvik, Norway; part of Operation Weserübung
- Operation Niwi 1940 - German troop deployment in Belgium; part of Fall Gelb
- Operation Nord 1940 - German heavy cruiser Admiral Scheer's raid in the North Atlantic Ocean
- Operation Nord 1940 - German planned invasion of Denmark and Norway; later renamed to Operation Weserübung
- Operation Nordmark 1940 - German attacks on Allied North Sea convoys between Britain and Scandinavia
- Operation Nordseetour 1940 - German first Atlantic operation of Admiral Hipper
- Operation Oldenburg 1940 - German aerial reconnaissance of Soviet Union's natural resources
- Operation Oldenburg 1940 - German attack on Oslo, Norway; part of Operation Weserübung
- Operation Oskar 1940 - German motorboat action off Dover, England, Britain
- Operation Otto 1940 - German strategic preparations for Operation Barbarossa
- Operation Panther (1940) 1940 - German attacks on Strasbourg, France; part of Fall Braun
- Operation Paula 1940 - German aerial bombing of French countryside
- Operation Planspiel III 1940 - German breakthrough of the Maginot Line between Teting and Wittring, France
- Operation Raubvogelkäfig 1940 - German attack on the Maginot Line; part of Fall Grün
- Operation Regenschirm 1940 - German aerial bombing of Birmingham, England
- Operation Scharnhorst 1940 - German deceptive attack in the Saarbrücken region; part of Fall Grün
- Operation Seelöwe 1940 - German planned invasion of Britain; anglicised as 'Sealion'
- Operation Seemöwe 1940–1945 - German agents infiltration into Britain and Ireland
- Operation Sonnenblume 1940 - German response to British Operation Compass offensive in North Africa; deployment of the German Afrika Korps in North Africa
- Operation Stadthagen 1940 - German attack on Stavanger, Norway; part of Operation Weserübung
- Operation Stahl 1940 - German commando operation to occupy a bridge near Veldwezelt, Belgium
- Operation Tannenbaum 1940 - German planned invasion of Switzerland
- Operation Taube 1940 - German mission to transport Irish Republican Army Chief of Staff Seán Russell from Germany to Ireland
- Operation Theodora 1940 - German intelligence gathering operation in North Africa
- Operation Tiger 1940 - German offensive on the northern sector of the Maginot Line; part of Fall Rot
- Operation Trojanisches Pferd 1940 - German operation to secure the bridge near Nijmegen in the Netherlands
- Operation Trondheim 1940 - German movement across the Albert Canal against Fort Eben-Emael in Belgium
- Operation Wal 1940 - German aborted plan to coordinate actions with Scottish and Welsh nationalist groups
- Operation Walfisch 1940 - German aborted plan to land an agent in Ireland
- Operation Weserübung 1940 - German invasion of Denmark and Norway
- Operation Weserübung Nord 1940 - German attack on Trondheim and Narvik, Norway; part of Operation Weserübung
- Operation Weserübung Sud 1940 - German attack on Bergen, Kristiansand, and Oslo, Norway; part of Operation Weserübung
- Operation Wespennest I 1940 - German destruction of rail links between Switzerland and France
- Operation Wespennest II 1940 - German destruction of rail links between Switzerland and France
- Operation Wikinger 1940 - German sortie by German destroyers into the North Sea
- Operation Wildente 1940 - German naval and air operation in Trondheim, Norway

== 1941 ==
- Operation 25 1941 - German invasion of Yugoslavia
- Operation Alpenveilchen 1941 - German aborted planned intervention during the Italian invasion of Albania
- Operation Amina 1941 - German failed operation to destroy oil refineries in Abadan, Iran
- Operation Barbarossa 1941 - German invasion of the Soviet Union
- Operation Beethoven 1941–1945 - German program to develop composite aircraft
- Operation Beowulf I 1941 - German planned offensive of the Baltic States
- Operation Beowulf II 1941 - German offensive in the Baltic States
- Operation Berlin 1941 - German commerce raid in the Atlantic Ocean performed by Scharnhorst and Gneisenau
- Operation Bernhard 1941 - German plan to destabilise British economy with counterfeit British banknotes
- Operation Blaufuchs 1 1941 - German deployment of forces from Germany to northern Finland, part of Operation Silberfuchs
- Operation Blaufuchs 2 1941 - German deployment of German forces from Norway to northern Finland, part of Operation Silberfuchs
- Operation Bogdanow 1941 - German construction operation to build rail bridges between Lida and Molodechno in Belorussia
- Operation Brandung 1941 - Axis offensive toward El Alamein, Egypt
- Operation Castigo 1941 - German aerial bombing of Belgrade, Yugoslavia
- Operation Eisstoss 1941 - German air raids against Soviet Baltic Fleet at Kronstadt and Leningrad, USSR
- Operation Fledermaus 1941 - German aerial bombing of British airfields
- Operation Fritz 1941 - German planned invasion of the Soviet Union; later abandoned in favor of Operation Barbarossa
- Operation Froschlaich 1941 - German air raids against Soviet Navy at Leningrad, USSR; part of Operation Eisstoss
- Operation Götz v. Berlichingen 1941 - German air raids against Soviet Navy at Leningrad, USSR; part of Operation Eissto
- Operation Haifisch I 1941 - German deceptive operation to hint a false invasion of Scotland and England, from Norway before the start of Operation Barbarossa
- Operation Haifisch II 1941 - German deceptive operation to hint a false invasion of Scotland and England, from Norway before the start of Operation Barbarossa
- Operation Hannibal 1941 - German invasion of the island of Lemnos, Greece
- Operation Hannibal 1941 - German operation to take the bridge over the Corinth Canal, near Corinth, Greece
- Operation Harpune 1941 - German deceptive operation to hint a false invasion of southern England, from France before the start of Operation Barbarossa
- Operation Ikarus 1941 - Proposed German invasion of the Kingdom of Iceland
- Operation Irak 1941 - German deployment of aircraft to Iraq
- Operation Isabella 1941 - German planned invasion of the Iberian Peninsula
- Operation Karlsbad 1941 - German anti-partisan operation in the Berezina River region of Belorussia
- Operation Lel 1941 - German diversionary plan in support of operation Beowulf II; part of Operation Nordwind
- Operation Marita 1941 - German invasion of Greece
- Operation Merkur 1941 - German invasion of Crete, Greece
- Operation Mitte 1941 - German attack on the island of Hiiumaa, off Estonian coast; part of Operation Siegfried
- Operation Nau 1941 - German diversionary plan in support of Operation Beowulf II; part of Operation Nordwind
- Operation Nordpol 1941 - German counter-intelligence operation in the Netherlands
- Operation Nordwind 1941 - German diversionary invasion of the island of Saaremaa, Estonia in support of Operation Beowulf II
- Operation Ost 1941 - German attack on Hiiumaa, an island off Estonian coast; part of Operation Siegfried
- Operation Ozren 1941–1942 - German anti-partisan operations near Ozren, Yugoslavia
- Operation Platinfuchs 1941 - German attack towards Murmansk, USSR from Finnish Petsamo, part of Operation Silberfuchs
- Operation Polarfuchs 1941 - German attack towards Kandalaksha, USSR from Finnish Lapland, part of Operation Silberfuchs
- Operation Renate 1941 - German motorboat action off Dover, England
- Operation Renntier 1941 - German occupation of Petsamo; part of Operation Silberfuchs
- Operation Rheinübung 1941 - German planned attacks on Allied shipping conducted by Bismarck and Prinz Eugen
- Operation Salaam 1941 - German plan to make contact with Egyptian nationalists
- Operation Schlussjagd 1941 - German offensive towards Tula, USSR during the offensive toward Moscow by the 2nd Panzer
- Operation Siegfried 1941 - German attack on Hiiumaa, an island off Estonia; part of Operation Beowulf II
- Operation Silberfuchs 1941 - German attack on Murmansk, USSR; Anglicized as 'Silver Fox'
- Operation Skorpion 1941 - Axis offensive at the Halfaya Pass on the border of Libya and Egypt
- Operation Sommernachtstraum 1941 - Axis attack on British supply depots at Bir Khirreigat, Egypt
- Operation Spark 1941 - German planned assassination of Adolf Hitler and coup d'état against the Nazi German government
- Operation Stimmung 1941 - German diversionary plan in support of Operation Beowulf II; part of Operation Nordwind
- Operation Strafe 1941 - German bombing of Belgrade, Yugoslavia; part of Operation 25
- Operation Strafe 1941 - German planned invasion of Bulgaria
- Operation Sturmflut 1941 - German offensive at the Kasserine Pass, Tunisia
- Operation Südwind 1941 - German defence plan against a general uprising in occupied France
- Operation Südwind 1941 - German diversionary attack on the island of Saaremaa, Estonia in support of Operation Beowulf II
- Operation Taifun 1941 - German offensive toward Moscow, USSR; part of Operation Barbarossa
- Operation Taube 1941 - German plan to support the Irish Republican Army in Ireland and Northern Ireland
- Operation Tichwin 1941 - German offensive on Leningrad, USSR
- Operation Venezia 1941 - German advance toward the Gazala Line near Bir Hakeim, Libya
- Operation Višegrad 1941 - Axis anti-partisan operation in the Independent State of Croatia
- Operation Weber 1941 - German naval operation off the coast of Southern England
- Operation West 1941 - German attack on Hiiumaa, an island off Estonia; part of Operation Siegfried
- Operation Weststurm 1941 - German naval operation in support of Operation Beowulf II
- Operation Westwind 1941 - German diversionary plan in support of Operation Beowulf II

== 1942 ==
- Operation Adler 1942 - German anti-partisan operation in Chechivichi region of Belorussia
- Operation Aida 1942 - Axis offensive in Libya with Tobruk as the initial objective in Libya, and advance into Egypt as a strategic goal
- Operation Albia 1942 - Axis anti-partisan operation in the Independent State of Croatia; also known as Operation Alba and Operation Albija
- Operation Alfa 1942 - Axis anti-partisan operation in Yugoslavia
- Fall Anton 1942 - German occupation of Vichy France with Italian support in 1942
- Operation Attika 1942 - German attack on Tuapse, in the Caucasus region
- Operation Bamberg 1942 - German anti-partisan operation around Bobruisk, Belorussia in conjunction with Operation München I
- Operation Beta 1942 - Axis anti-partisan operation in Yugoslavia
- Operation Bettelstab 1942 - German planned offensive at Leningrad, USSR
- Fall Blau 1942 - German offensive against Voronezh, USSR
- Operation Blücher 1942 - German attack on the Strait of Kerch in the Caucasus region, and Rzhev, USSR; part of Fall Blau
- Operation Blücher II 1942 - German attack on the Strait of Kerch in the Caucasus region in southern USSR; part of Fall Blau
- Operation Braun 1942 - German defence of Tunis, Tunisia in response to Allied operation Torch
- Operation Braunschweig 1942 - German offensive toward Stalingrad and the general Caucasus region in Southern USSR; part of Fall Blau
- Operation Brückenschlag 1942 - German breakout attempt following the Soviet envelopment of German troops in Demyansk, south of Leningrad, USSR
- Operation Bussard 1942 - German offensive in the Caucasus region of Southern USSR
- Operation Capri 1942 - Axis counterattack at Medenine, Tunisia
- Operation Clausewitz 1942 - German second phase of the German summer offensive in the Caucasus region of Southern USSR
- Operation Cottbus 1942 - German anti-partisan operation in Polotsk, Lepel, and Borisov in Belorussia
- Operation Dampfhamm 1942 - German planned third phase of the German summer offensive in the Caucasus region of Southern USSR
- Operation Derfflinger 1942 - German cancelled pincer operation against Ostashkov, USSR
- Operation Donnerkeil 1942 - German air superiority for Operation Cerberus
- Operation Donnerschlag 1942 - German planned break-out movement from Stalingrad, USSR
- Operation Doppelschlag 1942 - German anti-shipping operation off Novaya Zemlya by Admiral Scheer and Admiral Hipper
- Operation Dora 1942 - German operation to disrupt British supply lines in Southern Libya
- Operation Dreiecke 1942 - German anti-partisan operation in Bryansk, USSR
- Operation Edelweiss 1942 - Axis offensive on Caucasus region in southern USSR; part of Operation Braunschweig
- Operation Feuerzauber 1942 - German planned attack on Leningrad, USSR; renamed to Operation Nordlicht
- Operation Fischreiher 1942 - German attack on Stalingrad and Astrakhan, USSR; part of Fall Blau
- Operation Foca 1942 - Axis anti-partisan operation in the Independent State of Croatia
- Operation Fredericus I 1942 - German attack on Kharkov, USSR
- Operation Fredericus II 1942 - German attack on Odessa, Ukraine as a follow-up operation to Operation Fredericus I
- Operation Frieda 1942 - German anti-partisan operation
- Operation Fruška gora 1942 - Axis anti-partisan operation in the Independent State of Croatia
- Operation Georg 1942 - German planned attack on Leningrad, USSR; renamed to Operation Feuerzauber
- Operation Gertrud 1942 - German planned response in case of Turkey joining the Allies
- Operation Gisella 1942 - German planned invasion of the Iberian Peninsula; revised from Operation Isabella
- Operation Greif 1942 - German anti-partisan operation in Orsha and Vitebsk, Belorussia
- Operation Grünspecht 1942 - German anti-partisan operation in Bryansk, USSR
- Operation Hanover I 1942 - German operation near Vyazma, USSR
- Operation Hanover II 1942 - German anti-partisan operation in the Upper Dnieper River region (Byelorussia and Ukraine)
- Operation Hecht 1942 - German first planned submarine wolfpack raid in the North Atlantic Ocean
- Operation Herbstlaub 1942 - German cancelled planned operation in the Caucasus region of Southern USSR, near Krasnoarmeisk, Ukraine and Beketovka, USSR
- Operation Herbstzeitlose 1942 - German cancelled planned plan to advance to the Don and Volga Rivers in the Caucasus region of Southern USSR
- Operation Herkules 1942 - German planned airborne invasion of Malta
- Operation Holzauge 1942 - German activities in Greenland
- Operation Hornbläser 1942 - German planned attack on Alexandria harbour, Egypt
- Operation Ilona 1942 - German planned invasion of the Iberian Peninsula; revised from Operation Isabella
- Operation Jacob 1942 - German anti-partisan operation in Uzda, Belorussia
- Operation Jajce 1942 - Axis anti-partisan operation in the Independent State of Croatia
- Operation Jajce II 1942 - Axis anti-partisan operation in the Independent State of Croatia
- Operation Jajce III 1942 - Axis anti-partisan operation in the Independent State of Croatia
- Operation K 1942 - Axis anti-partisan operation in the Independent State of Croatia
- Operation Kasten 1942 - Axis anti-partisan operation in the Independent State of Croatia
- Operation Klabautermann 1942 - German operation against Soviet supply lines near Leningrad, USSR
- Operation Klette I 1942 - German anti-partisan operation in Bryansk, USSR
- Operation Kozara 1942 - Axis anti-partisan operation in the Independent State of Croatia
- Operation Kreml 1942 - German deceptive operation in support of Operation Edelwei
- Operation Kreševo 1942 - Axis anti-partisan operation in the Independent State of Croatia
- Operation Lachsfang 1942 - German combined German and Finnish attack against Kandalaksha and Belomorsk, USSR
- Operation Landbrücke 1942 - German attempt to hold a narrow connection near Demyansk, south of Leningrad, USSR to prevent envelopment
- Operation Lichtschlag 1942 - German cancelled planned attack north of Cholm, USSR near the Lovat and Kunya Rivers
- Operation Lila 1942 - German attempt to capture the French fleet at Toulon, France
- Operation Lug 1942 - Axis anti-partisan operation in the Independent State of Croatia
- Operation Maikäfer 1942 - German anti-partisan operation in Babruysk, Belorussia
- Operation Malaria 1942 - German anti-partisan operation in Osipovichi, Belorussia
- Operation Manjaca Mountains 1942 - Axis anti-partisan operation in the Independent State of Croatia
- Operation Maus 1942 - Axis offensive toward the Caucasus region in Southern USSR
- Operation Mitte Juli 1942 - German anti-partisan operation
- Operation Moorbrand 1942 - Cancelled planned attack near Pogostje, USSR
- Operation München I 1942 - German anti-partisan operation in Belorussia
- Operation München II 1942 - German anti-partisan operation in Radoshkovichi, Belorussia
- Operation Märzfieber 1942 - German anti-partisan operation in Belorussia
- Operation Möwe I 1942 - German planned operation to sabotage aluminum factories in southern Scotland, Britain
- Operation Neuland 1942 - German submarine operation in the Caribbean
- Operation Nordlicht 1942 - German planned attack on Leningrad, USSR; formerly planned as Operation Feuerzauber
- Operation Nordpol 1942 - German cancelled planned operation east of Moscow, USSR
- Operation Nordsee 1942 - German anti-partisan operation in Mogilev, Belorussia
- Operation Ochsenkopf 1942 - German counterattacks in attempt to expand the Tunis perimeter
- Operation Olymp 1942 - German anti-partisan operation in Greece
- Operation Orkan 1942 - German cancelled planned attack in the Belov–Yukhnov area towards Kaluga in USSR
- Operation Orkan II 1942 - German anti-partisan operation in Lublin, Poland
- General Plan Ost 1942 - German plan for genocide throughout Europe
- Operation Pastorius 1942 - German plan to sabotage industrial targets at Long Island, New York, United States
- Operation Paukenschlag 1942 - German submarine campaign against shipping off the east coast of the United States; nicknamed 'Second Happy Time'
- Operation Petrova gora I 1942 - Axis anti-partisan operation in the Independent State of Croatia
- Operation Petrova gora II 1942 - Axis anti-partisan operation in the Independent State of Croatia
- Operation Polarnacht 1942 - German deployment of battleship Tirpitz from Wilhelmshaven, Germany, to Trondheim, Norway
- Operation Prijedor 1942 - Axis anti-partisan operation in the Independent State of Croatia
- Provincia di Lubiana 1942 - Axis anti-partisan operation in the Independent State of Croatia
- Operation Raubtier 1942 - German attack toward the Volkhov River near Leningrad, USSR, which encircled the 2nd Shock Army.
- Operation Regatta 1942 - German anti-partisan operation in the Smolensk–Gorky area in USSR
- Operation Regenbogen 1942 - German failed attack on Arctic Convoy JW 51B by Admiral Hipper and Lützow
- Operation Rösselsprung 1942 - German naval operation to attack Arctic Convoy PQ 17
- Operation S 1942 - Axis anti-partisan operation in the Independent State of Croatia
- Operation Sandmann 1942 - Axis anti-partisan operation in the Independent State of Croatia
- Operation Schamil 1942 - German planned operation to secure Caucasus oil fields in Southern USSR using paratroopers
- Operation Schnee 1942 - German supply mission to Norway
- Operation Siegfried 1942 - German attack toward Stalingrad and the general Caucasus region in Southern USSR; part of Fall Blau
- Operation Silberstreife 1942 - German planned operations against Allied convoys to Murmansk, USSR
- Operation Skorpion 1942 - German attack on Halfaya Pass, on the border of Libya and Egypt
- Operation Sportpalast 1942 - German deployment of cruisers Prinz Eugen and Admiral Scheer to Norway
- Operation Spätlese 1942 - German anti-partisan operation north of Smolensk, USSR
- Operation Sportpalast 1942 - Failed planned naval operation to attack Arctic convoys PQ-12 and QP-8
- Operation Storfang 1942 - German attack on Sevastopol, Ukraine
- Operation Süd-Kroatien I 1942 - Axis anti-partisan operation in the Independent State of Croatia
- Operation Süd-Kroatien II 1942 - Axis anti-partisan operation in the Independent State of Croatia
- Operation Sumpf 1942 - German operation near Demyansk, south of Leningrad, USSR
- Operation Sumpffieber 1942 - German anti-partisan operation in Loknja, Ukraine
- Operation Taubenschlag 1942 - German cancelled planned attack on Toropets, USSR
- Operation Theseus 1942 - Axis offensive in Cyrenaica, Libya and Egypt
- Operation Tintenfisch 1942 - German seizure of Swiss exports
- Operation Trappenjagd 1942 - German offensive on the Kerch Peninsula, Ukraine
- Operation Travnik 1942 - Axis anti-partisan operation in the Independent State of Croatia
- Operation Trio 1942 - Axis anti-partisan operation in Bosnia and Croatia, Yugoslavia
- Operation Tuzla II 1942 - Axis anti-partisan operation in the Independent State of Croatia
- Operation Venezie 1942 - German advance against the British Gazala Line toward Tobruk, Libya
- Operation Vierecke 1942 - German anti-partisan operation in Bryansk, USSR
- Operation Vogelsang 1942 - German anti-partisan operation in the Roslavl and Bryansk region of USSR
- Operation Wei 1942 - German anti-partisan operations in Croatia, Yugoslavia
- Operation Wee-Hee - German plan to massacre all the Hispanics living in Germany at the time
- Operation West-Bosnien 1942 - Axis anti-partisan operation in the Independent State of Croatia
- Operation Wiesengrund 1942 - German unrealised plan for occupation of the Rybachy Peninsula on the USSR's Arctic coast
- Operation Wilhelm 1942 - German operation against Volchansk, USSR
- Operation Winkelreid 1942 - German operation within the Demyansk Pocket near Leningrad, USSR
- Operation Wintermärchen 1942 - German attack between the Volga and Don Rivers
- Operation Wolke 1942 - German transfer to troops to Norway
- Operation Wunderland 1942 - German anti-shipping operation in Kara Sea and Barents Sea by cruiser Admiral Scheer
- Operation Zar 1942 - German minelying operation by the minelayer Ulm.
- Operation Zarin 1942 - German mining action off Novaya Zemlya archipelago in the Arctic Ocean by Admiral Hipper and destroyers
- Operation Zauberflöte 1942 - German operation to manoeuvre damaged Prinz Eugen from Trondheim, Norway to Kiel, Germany
- Operation Zenica-Zavidovici 1942 - Axis anti-partisan operation in the Independent State of Croatia
- Operation Zerberus 1942 - German break-out of German capital ships from Brest, France, to Norway; Anglicized as 'Cerberus' and nicknamed by the British as the 'Channel Dash'

== 1943 ==
- Operation 505 1943 - German anti-partisan operation in Tuzla, Bosnia, Yugoslavia
- Fall Achse 1943 - German response to Italian surrender to the Allies
- Operation Adler 1943 - Axis anti-partisan operation on the north Dalmatian coast in Yugoslavia, with focus in the cities of Rijeka, Karlobag, and Zadar
- Operation Arnim 1943 - German anti-partisan operation in the Fruška gora Mountains in Syrmia in the Independent State of Croatia
- Operation Attacke 1943 - German mine laying operation north of Corsica, France
- Operation Ausladung 1943 - German offensive near Tunis, Tunisia in conjunction with Operation Ochsenkopf
- Operation Berta 1943 - Axis anti-partisan operation in the Independent State of Croatia
- Operation Bilo gora 1943 - Axis anti-partisan operation in the Independent State of Croatia
- Operation Bilo gora Ost 1943 - Axis anti-partisan operation in the Bilogora Mountains in the Independent State of Croatia
- Operation Braun 1943 - German anti-partisan operation in Yugoslavia
- Operation Brunhild 1943 - German planned evacuation from the Caucasus region in Southern USSR
- Operation Burdock 1943 - German anti-partisan operation in USSR
- Operation Büffel-Bewegung 1943 - German evacuation of Rzhev, USSR
- Operation Cannae 1943 - German occupation of Zagreb, Sisak, and Bjelovar in Yugoslavia
- Operation Cardaci 1943 - Axis anti-partisan operation near Cardaci in the Independent State of Croatia
- Operation Cyrill 1943 - Axis anti-partisan operation at the Glogovnica Canal on the Česma River in the Independent State of Croatia
- Operation Delphin 1943 - German anti-partisan operation in the Dalmatian islands in Adriatic Sea
- Operation Delphin 1943 - German withdrawal from Saaremaa, Estonia
- Operation Delta 1943 - German anti-partisan operation in Western Greece
- Operation Domino 1943 - German second aborted German Arctic sortie by Scharnhorst, Prinz Eugen, and supporting destroyers
- Operation Donnerkeil 1943 - German anti-partisan operation in Yugoslavia
- Operation Donnerschlag 1943 - German anti-partisan operation along the Obdol River in USSR
- Operation Draufgänger 1943 - German anti-partisan operation in USSR
- Operation Eiche 1943 - German operation to rescue Benito Mussolini from Allied imprisonment
- Operation Eilbote I 1943 - German attacks on Allied positions at the Dorsal Mountains in Tunisia
- Operation Eilbote II 1943 - German cancelled planned attacks on Allied positions at the Dorsal Mountains in Tunisia following Operation Eilbote I
- Operation Eisb 1943 - German anti-partisan operation in Bryansk, USSR
- Operation Eisbär 1943 - German invasion of Kos, Greece
- Operation Eisenhammer 1943 - German planned aerial bombing operation against power generators in Moscow and Gorky, USSR
- Operation Eisfjord 1943 - German naval bombardment of Spitsbergen, Svalbard, Norway
- Operation Erntefest I 1943 - German anti-partisan operation west of Ossipovichi, USSR
- Operation Erntefest II 1943 - German anti-partisan operation near Minsk and Slutsk, Belorussia
- Operation Ferdinand 1943 - German anti-partisan operation in the Fruška gora Mountains in Syrmia in the Independent State of Croatia
- Operation Ferkel 1943 - German anti-partisan operation in Bryansk, USSR
- Operation Ferkel 1943 - Axis anti-partisan operation in the Majevica mountains northeast of Tuzla in the Independent State of Croatia
- Operation Feuerstein 1943 - German defensive build-up of the Italian Alpine passes
- Operation Fliederblüte 1943 - German attack of British units at the "Banana Ridge" in Tunisia
- Operation Franz 1943 - German commando operation against British supply lines in Iran
- Operation Freischütz 1943 - German anti-partisan operation
- Operation Fronttheater 1943 - German first aborted German Arctic sortie by Scharnhorst, Prinz Eugen, and destroyers
- Operation Frühlungswind 1943 - Axis attack on Faid Pass near Sidi Bouzid, Tunisia
- Operation Gamma 1943 - German anti-partisan operation in Yugoslavia
- Operation Geiserich 1943 - Axis anti-partisan operation in Split on the coast of the Independent State of Croatia
- Operation Gesellenprüfung 1943 - German mine laying operation via S-Boats
- Operation Grün 1943 - Axis anti-partisan operation in the Independent State of Croatia
- Operation Grün II 1943 - Axis anti-partisan operation at the Kupa River between the Sava and the Farkašic-Kravarsko line in the Independent State of Croatia
- Operation Günther 1943 - German anti-partisan operation in Smolensk, USSR prior to Operation Zitadelle
- Operation Gustav 1943 - Axis anti-partisan operation in the Independent State of Croatia
- Operation Habicht 1943 - German anti-partisan operation
- Operation Hagen 1943 - German operation in the Caucasus region of Southern USSR
- Operation Hagen Bewegung 1943 - German evacuation operation near Oryol, USSR
- Operation Haifisch 1943 - German anti-partisan operation in Trogir in Croatia, Yugoslavia
- Operation Hamburg 1943 - German anti-partisan operation in Bryansk, USSR
- Operation Hasenjagd 1943 - German anti-partisan operation in Gomel, Belorussia
- Operation Herbstgewitter I 1943 - German anti-partisan operation at Pelješac peninsula, Independent State of Croatia
- Operation Herbstgewitter II 1943 - German anti-partisan operation at Peljesac peninsula, Independent State of Croatia
- Operation Herbstgewitter III 1943 - German anti-partisan operations at the islands of Mljet, Hvar, Brac, and Solta off the coast of Independent State of Croatia
- Operation Herbstgewitter IV 1943 - German anti-partisan operations at the islands of Mljet, Hvar, Brac, and Solta off the coast of Independent State of Croatia
- Operation Hermann 1943 - German anti-partisan operation in Vilnius and Polotsk, Belorussia
- Operation Hermelin 1943 - German cruiser Lützow operation in the Baltic Sea
- Operation Hornung 1943 - German anti-partisan operation
- Operation Hubertus 1943 - German anti-partisan operation in Pindus Mountains region of Greece
- Operation Husar 1943 - German cancelled planned anti-shipping operation in Kara Sea by Lützow
- Operation Insel 1943 - German action at Hydra Island, Greece
- Operation Istrien 1943 - German anti-partisan operation in Northern Italy
- Operation Ivan 1943 - Axis anti-partisan operation in the Moslavacka Mountains in the Independent State of Croatia
- Operation Karin 1943 - German deployment of naval vessels in the English Channel
- Operation Kiebitz 1943 - German POW rescue operation via submarine navigation of the St. Lawrence River in Canada
- Operation Klara 1943 - Axis anti-partisan operation in the Velika Kladuša area in the Independent State of Croatia
- Operation Klašnice 1943 - Axis anti-partisan operation in the Independent State of Croatia
- Operation Konstantin 1943 - German seizure of Italian equipment and territory upon the Italian surrender
- Operation Kopenhagen 1943 - German defensive build-up of the French and Italian Alpine passes
- Operation Kormoran 1943 - German anti-partisan operation in Minsk and Borisov, Belorussia
- Operation Krause I 1943 - Axis anti-partisan operation in the Independent State of Croatia
- Operation Krause II 1943 - Axis anti-partisan operation in the Independent State of Croatia
- Operation Krimhilde Bewegung 1943 - German evacuation of the Caucasus region in Southern USSR
- Operation Kuckucksei 1943 - German cancelled planned attack on British units at the Fondouk Pass, Tunisia
- Operation Kugelblitz 1943 - German anti-partisan operation near Vitebsk, Belarus
- Operation Kugelblitz 1943 - Axis anti-partisan operation in the area between Rogatica and Vlasenica in the Independent State of Croatia
- Operation Landsturm 1943 - German anti-partisan operation in Makarska, Independent State of Croatia
- Operation Leander 1943 - German anti-partisan operation across the Lika Mountains to Zadar on the coast of the Independent State of Croatia after
- Operation Lehrgang 1943 - German evacuation of Sicily, Italy, over the Strait of Messina
- Operation Leopard 1943 - German landings on Leros of the Dodecanese Islands, Greece
- Operation Lika 1943 - German planned anti-partisan operation against Josip Broz Tito in Yugoslavia
- Operation Maigewitter 1943 - German anti-partisan operation
- Operation Merkur 1943 - Axis anti-partisan operation in the Krbavsko Polje plain in the Independent State of Croatia
- Operation Michael 1943 - German cancelled planned evacuation of Crimea
- Operation Mirko 1943 - Axis anti-partisan operation in the Independent State of Croatia
- Operation Morgenluft 1943 - German attack on Gafsa, Tunisia
- Operation Moslavacka gora 1943 - Axis anti-partisan operation in the Independent State of Croatia
- Operation Nachbarhilfe I 1943 - German anti-partisan operation in Bryansk, USSR
- Operation Nachbarhilfe I 1943 - German anti-partisan operation in Mglin, USSR
- Operation Nelly U 1943 - German towing of a 3,000-ton drydock from Mariupol to Odessa, Ukraine
- Operation Neptun 1943 - German counter-offensive at Myschanko-Berg during the Battle of Stalingrad
- Operation Nürnberg 1943 - German planned response in case of an Allied invasion of the Iberian Peninsula, focusing largely around the defence of the Pyrenees passes
- Operation Olivenernte 1943 - German cancelled planned attack on Majaz al Bab, Tunisia
- Operation Orange 1943 - German convoy off Temryuk, Southern USSR in the Sea of Azov
- Operation Ostern 1943 - Axis anti-partisan operation in the Independent State of Croatia
- Operation Ostfront 1943 - German final German operation of Scharnhorst to intercept Convoy JW 55B
- Operation Otto (1943) 1943 - Axis anti-partisan operation in the Grmec Mountains in the Independent State of Croatia
- Operation Ozren 1943 - Axis anti-partisan operation in the Sunja area in the Independent State of Croatia
- Operation Paderborn 1943 - German third and successful German transfer of Scharnhorst and destroyers from the Baltic Sea to Narvik, Norway
- Operation Panther (1943, Yugoslavia) 1943 - German anti-partisan operation at Mesovan Pass in Southeastern Croatia, Yugoslavia
- Operation Panther (1943, Greece) 1943 - German anti-partisan operation in Greece
- Operation Panther (1943, USSR) 1943 - German anti-partisan operation near Kursk, USSR after Operation Zitadelle
- Operation Panzerfaust 1943 - German operation to kidnap Miklós Horthy's son to prevent Horthy from siding with the Allies; codename later changed to Maus
- Operation Parnass 1943 - German anti-partisan operation in Lamia, Greece
- Operation Paula 1943 - German anti-partisan operation north of the Sava River in Serbia
- Operation Petrinja 1943 - Axis anti-partisan operation at the Okučani-Lipik-Banova Jaruga-Novska area in the Independent State of Croatia
- Operation Pfingsten 1943 - Axis anti-partisan operation in the Prnjavor-Kotor Varoš-Teslic area in the Independent State of Croatia
- Operation Poseidon 1943 - German operation against British troops on the Greek island of Samos; part of Operation Zwischenspiel
- Operation Puma 1943 - German anti-partisan operation in Greece
- Operation Rabat 1943 - German plan to kidnap the Pope from the Vatican City
- Operation Raureif 1943 - Axis anti-partisan operation in Turbe (Travnik) in the Independent State of Croatia
- Operation Regatta I 1943 - German artillery bombardment of the Strait of Kerch between the Black Sea and the Sea of Azov
- Operation Reinhard 1943 - German systematic murder of Polish intelligentia; phase I of the German 'Final Solution'
- Operation Richard 1943 - Axis anti-partisan operation near Razboj in the Independent State of Croatia
- Operation Ristow 1943 - Axis anti-partisan operation between Bosanski Novi and Prijedor in the Independent State of Croatia
- Operation Safari 1943 - German SS operation to disband the Danish military
- Operation Schneesturm 1943 - German anti-partisan operation in Bosnia, Independent State of Croatia
- Operation Schnepfe 1943 - German anti-partisan operation north of Vitebsk, Belorussia in conjunction with Operation Wildente
- Operation Schwarz 1943 - German plan in the event of an Italian surrender
- Operation Schwarz 1943 - Axis anti-partisan operation in Montenegro and Herzegovina, Yugoslavia
- Operation Seehund 1943 - German submarine mining operation
- Operation Seeräuber 1943 - German failed landing on the island of Brac off the coast of Independent State of Croatia
- Operation Siegfried 1943 - German plan to deploy Italian units to Southern France after Italian surrender
- Operation Sizilien 1943 - German raid on Allied occupied Spitsbergen, Svalbard, Norway
- Operation Tannenbaum 1943 - Axis anti-partisan operation in the area between Bosanski Novi and Buzim in the Independent State of Croatia
- Operation Teslic I 1943 - Axis anti-partisan operation in the Independent State of Croatia
- Operation Theodor 1943 - German convoy off Temryuk, Southern USSR in the Sea of Azov
- Operation Tiger 1943 - German anti-partisan operation in Greece
- Operation Toni 1943 - German convoy off Temryuk, Southern USSR in the Sea of Azov
- Operation Trave 1943 - German escort operations for blockade runners
- Operation Ulm 1943 - German planned aerial bombing operation against Soviet industries in the Ural Mountains
- Operation Ulrich 1943 - Axis anti-partisan operation in the Kozara Mountains in the Independent State of Croatia
- Operation Una-Sava Bend 1943 - Axis anti-partisan operation in the Independent State of Croatia
- Operation Ursula 1943 - German anti-partisan operation in Rogachev, Belorussia
- Operation Varaždin 1943 - Axis anti-partisan operation in the Kalnik Mountains between Varaždin and Križevci in the Independent State of Croatia
- Operation Virovitica 1943 - Axis anti-partisan operation in the Independent State of Croatia
- Operation Waldwinter 1943 - German anti-partisan operation north of Vitebsk, Belorussia
- Operation Weihnachtsmann 1943 - German anti-partisan operation in the Balkans
- Operation Weiß I 1943 - German anti-partisan operation in Sarajevo, Independent State of Croatia
- Operation Weiß II 1943 - German anti-partisan operation in Sarajevo, Independent State of Croatia; continuation of Operation Weiß I
- Operation Wiking 1943 - German operations in the Caucasus region of Southern USSR
- Operation Wildente 1943 - German anti-partisan operation north of Vitebsk, Belorussia in conjunction with Operation Schnepfe
- Operation Wildsau 1943 - German anti-partisan operation in USSR
- Operation Wildsau 1943 - German anti-partisan operation in Tuzla, Independent State of Croatia
- Operation Windstoss 1943 - Axis anti-partisan operation in the Independent State of Croatia
- Operation Winterzauber 1943 - German anti-partisan operation in Lithuania
- Operation Wolkenbruch 1943 - German failed anti-partisan operation in Northern Yugoslavia
- Operation Wulf 1943 - German anti-partisan operation in Kordun, Bosnia, Banovina and Turopolje, Independent State of Croatia
- Operation Wunderland II 1943 - German planned naval operation involving cruiser Admiral Scheer in the East Siberian Sea
- Operation Yarmouth 1943 - German artillery bombardment of Yeysk, USSR
- Operation Zagorje 1943 - Axis anti-partisan operation in the Kalnik Mountains in the Novi Marof area in the Independent State of Croatia
- Operation Ziethen 1943 - German anti-partisan operation in Livno, Bosnia, Yugoslavia
- Operation Ziethen 1943 - German planned evacuation from the Demyansk Pocket near Leningrad, USSR
- Operation Zigeunerbaron 1943 - German anti-partisan operation in Bryansk, USSR
- Operation Zitadelle 1943 - German offensive at Kursk, USSR
- Operation Zitronella 1943 - German raid against a Norwegian/British station at the Svalbard Islands
- Operation Zwischenspiel 1943 - German attack on the Greek island of Samos; part of Operation Leopard

== 1944 ==
- Operation Antimon 1944 - German operations in Romania
- Operation Arras 1944 - Axis anti-partisan operation in the Lipik–Novska–Okučani region in the Independent State of Croatia
- Operation Aster 1944 - German evacuation of Estonia
- Operation Bergwiese 1944 - Axis anti-partisan operation on the Primošten Peninsula in the Independent State of Croatia
- Operation Bienenhaus 1944 - Axis anti-partisan operation in the Moslavina Mountains in the Independent State of Croatia
- Operation Birke 1944 - German plan to withdraw from northern Finland prior to the Lapland War
- Operation Blei 1944 - German operations in Romania
- Operation Blitz 1944 - Axis anti-partisan operation in the Našice–Đakovo region of Slavonia, Yugoslavia
- Operation Brandfackel 1944 - Axis anti-partisan operation in the Kozara Mountains in the Independent State of Croatia
- Operation Braunschweig 1944 - German anti-partisan operation in the Istria Peninsula, OZAK
- Operation Cannae 1944 - Axis anti-partisan operation in the area between the Sava and Drava Rivers in the Independent State of Croatia
- Operation Casanova 1944 - Axis anti-partisan operation in the Independent State of Croatia utilizing German aircraft to deceive partisan fighters
- Operation Christrose 1944 - German early name for Wacht am Rhein
- Operation Doppelkopf 1944 - German offensive to relieve troops fighting in Latvia
- Operation Doppelsprung 1944 - German planned evacuation of bridgeheads at the river Maas (Meuse) west of Arnhem, the Netherlands
- Operation Draufgänger 1944 - German anti-partisan operation in Montenegro, Yugoslavia and in Northern Albania
- Operation Dreznica 1944 - Axis anti-partisan operation in the Velika Kapela Mountains in the Independent State of Croatia to secure a supply route
- Operation Dubrovnik 1944 - Axis anti-partisan operation along the road between Zagreb and Varaždin in the Independent State of Croatia
- Operation Dubrovnik II 1944 - Axis anti-partisan operation along the road between Zagreb and Varaždin in the Independent State of Croatia; continuation of Operation Dubrovnik
- Operation Dünkirchen I 1944 - Axis anti-partisan operation in the Krašić region in the Independent State of Croatia
- Operation Dünkirchen II 1944 - Axis anti-partisan operation in the Krašić region in the Independent State of Croatia; continuation of Operation Dünkirchen I
- Operation Einhorn 1944 - German anti-partisan operation in Greece
- Operation Elster 1944 - German infiltration of agents into the US to gather intelligence on Manhattan Project
- Operation Emil 1944 - Axis anti-partisan operation west of Knin in the Independent State of Croatia
- Operation Ernteeinbringung 1944 - German anti-partisan operation east of Zagreb, Independent State of Croatia
- Fall Blume I 1944 - German defence plan in case of an Allied invasion of Northern France
- Fall Blume II 1944 - German defence plan in case of an Allied invasion of Southern France
- Fall Falke 1944 - German defence plan in case of an Allied invasion of Norway
- Fall Forelle I 1944 - German defence plan in case of an Allied invasion of the Balkans via the Adriatic Sea
- Fall Forelle II 1944 - German defence plan in case of an Allied invasion of the Balkans via the Aegean Sea
- Operation Falke 1944 - Axis anti-partisan operation in the Papuk Mountain and Bilogora Mountains in the Independent State of Croatia
- Operation Feuerwehr 1944 - German failed planned anti-partisan operation in Macedonia, Yugoslavia
- Operation Feuerzange 1944 - German anti-partisan operation in the Dalmatian islands in Adriatic Sea
- Operation Feuerzauber 1944 - German destruction of bridges near Florence, Italy
- Operation Fischfang 1944 - German counterattack to the Allied invasion at Anzio, Italy
- Operation Fliegenfänger 1944 - German anti-partisan operation in Memici and Osmaci in Bosnia, Yugoslavia
- Operation Föhn 1944 - Axis anti-partisan operation west of Banja Luka to open the road between Bosanski Novi and Prijedor in the Independent State of Croatia
- Operation Forelle 1944 - German operation to disrupt Soviet supply lines on the Danube River near Budapest, Hungary
- Operation Freischütz 1944 - German cancelled planned operation to occupy the island of Vis off Croatia, Yugoslavia
- Operation Freischütz 1944 - German relief operation for troops trapped near Minsk, Belorussia
- Operation Frühling 1944 - German anti-partisan operation in the Jura Mountains in Southern France
- Operation Frühlingsanfang 1944 - German anti-partisan operation at Primorska and Gorenjska in Slovenia, Yugoslavia
- Operation Frühlingsfest 1944 - German anti-partisan operation in Lepel, Belorussia as a follow-up operation of Operation Regenschauer
- Operation Frühlingswetter 1944 - Axis anti-partisan operation in the area between Knin and Kistanje in the Independent State of Croatia to secure a supply route
- Operation Fuchsjagd 1944 - Axis anti-partisan operation in the Ivanščica Mountains in the Independent State of Croatia
- Operation Fuchsjagd III 1944 - Axis anti-partisan operation in the Kalnik Mountains in the Independent State of Croatia
- Operation Gemsbock 1944 - German anti-partisan operation in the region near the Greek-Albanian border before Operation Einhorn
- Operation Greif 1944 - German infiltration of Allied rear areas using Allied uniforms; part of Wacht am Rhein
- Operation Großer Schlag 1944 - German planned mass-deployment of fighters against Allied bombers
- Fall Hanna 1944 - German defence plan in case of an Allied invasion of Denmark
- Operation Haudegen 1944 - German intelligence gathering on Spitsbergen, Norway
- Operation Heide 1944 - German flooding of parts of the Netherlands to hinder Allied advance; later renamed to Operation Storch
- Operation Heinrich 1944 - German deceptive operation in support of Wacht am Rhein
- Operation Herbstnebel 1944 - German rejected plan to withdraw German troops in Italy behind the Po River
- Operation Heu-Aktion 1944 - German enslavement of Eastern European children between the age of 10 and 15 to work in the German armament industry
- Operation Hinein 1944 - German submarine operation against an Allied convoy in the North Atlantic Ocean
- Operation Hohes Venn 1944 - German paratrooper operation as a part of Operation Greif of Wacht am Rhein
- Operation Horrido 1944 - German anti-partisan operation in Thessaloniki, Greece
- Operation Hundesohn 1944 - German occupation of Sofia, Bulgaria
- Operation Ibex 1944 - German air raids on London and other nearby British cities
- Operation Iltis 1944 - German anti-partisan operation in Thessaloniki, Greece
- Operation Ingeborg 1944 - Axis anti-partisan operation east of Karlovac and north of the Kupa River in the Independent State of Croatia
- Operation Jajce 1944 - Axis anti-partisan operation in the Vrbas Valley in the Independent State of Croatia
- Operation Judas 1944 - German anti-partisan operation in Bulgaria
- Kampf um Rom 1944 - German defence plan for the Nettuno area in Italy
- Operation Kastanie 1944 - Axis anti-partisan operation in the Prijedor–Sanski Most–Omarska area in the Independent State of Croatia
- Operation Kaub 1944 - Axis anti-partisan operation at the Sava River in the Independent State of Croatia, destroying all boats and ferries
- Operation Koralle 1944 - German anti-partisan operation in the Sporades Islands, Greece; previously named Operation Neptun
- Operation Kornblume 1944 - Axis anti-partisan operation in the Fruška gora Mountains in the Independent State of Croatia
- Operation Kreuzotter 1944 - German anti-partisan operation in Greece
- Operation Landwirt 1944 - German submarine operation against the Allied fleet off France during the Normandy invasion
- Operation Lauffeuer 1944 - Axis anti-partisan operation in the area south of Šid and near Ilok in Syrmia in the Independent State of Croatia
- Operation Laura 1944 - German proposed planned evacuation of Courland, Latvia
- Operation Ludwig 1944 - German plan against an Allied landing at Livorno, Italy
- Operation Lüttich 1944 - German counter-offensive at Mortain, France, in response to Operation Cobra
- Operation Maibaum 1944 - German anti-partisan operation in Vlasenica in Bosnia, Yugoslavia
- Operation Maigewitter 1944 - German anti-partisan operation in Northern Greece
- Fall Marder 1944 - German defence plan in case of an Allied invasion of Italy; activated after Allies launched Operation Shingle
- Fall Marder I 1944 - German defence plan in case of an Allied invasion of Italy via the Ligurian Sea; part of Fall Marder
- Fall Marder II 1944 - German defence plan in case of an Allied invasion of Italy via the Adriatic Sea; part of Fall Marder
- Operation Margarethe I 1944 - German occupation of Hungary
- Operation Margarethe II 1944 - German occupation of Romania
- Operation Martin 1944 - German planned attack of the Ardennes region as proposed by Gerd von Rundstedt; rejected by Adolf Hitler for being too conservative
- Operation Messer 1944 - German mining of the Ligurian Sea off Northern Italy
- Operation Morgenröte 1944 - German counterattack to the Allied invasion at Anzio and Nettuno, Italy
- Operation Morgenstern 1944 - Axis anti-partisan operation in the Krbavsko Polje plain in the Independent State of Croatia
- Operation Morgenwind I 1944 - German landing on the island of Brač off the coast of Croatia, Yugoslavia
- Operation Morgenwind II 1944 - German landing on the island of Šolta off the coast of Croatia, Yugoslavia
- Operation München 1944 - German fallback to the Arno River in the Tuscany region of Italy
- Operation Möwe V 1944 - German cancelled plan to land agents in Scotland, Britain
- Operation Napfkuchen 1944 - German anti-partisan operation in Yugoslavia
- Operation Neptun 1944 - German anti-partisan operation in the Sporades Islands, Greece; later renamed to Operation Koralle
- Operation Nibelungenfahrt 1944 - Axis anti-partisan operation in the Krbavsko Polje plain in the Independent State of Croatia
- Operation Nordlicht 1944 - German withdrawal from the Kola Peninsula into Norway after Finland changed sides in the war
- Operation Nordlicht-Bewegung 1944 - German troop deployment in Finland
- Operation Nussknacker 1944 - German torpedo boat operation off Corsica, France
- Operation Odysseus 1944 - German naval deployment in the Adriatic Sea and Aegean Sea
- Operation Panzerfaust 1944 - German occupation of Hungary
- Operation Pfingstausflug 1944 - German anti-partisan operation in Polotsk and Lepel, Belorussia
- Operation Prüfstand XII 1944 - German program to develop submarine-launched V-2 rockets
- Operation Regenschauer 1944 - German anti-partisan operation in Lepel and Polotsk in Belorussia
- Operation Reinhard 1944 - Axis occupation of ore mines in and around Ljubija in the Independent State of Croatia
- Operation Renate 1944 - Axis anti-partisan operation on the Murter Peninsula in the Independent State of Croatia
- Operation Rentier 1944 - German anti-partisan operation in Greece
- Operation Richard 1944 - German defence plan in case of an Allied invasion of Italy; activated after Allies launched Operation Shingle
- Operation Rouen 1944 - Axis anti-partisan operation at the Kalnik Mountains south of the Ludbreg–Koprivnica Line in the Independent State of Croatia
- Operation Rumpelkammer 1944 - German start of the V-1 rocket attacks against London
- Operation Rübezahl 1944 - German anti-partisan operation in Montenegro, Yugoslavia
- Operation Röslein 1944 - German anti-partisan operation in Macedonia, Yugoslavia
- Operation Rösselsprung 1944 - German attempt to capture Josip Broz Tito
- Operation Sarajevo 1944 - Axis anti-partisan operation west of the Sesvete–Varaždin road in the Independent State of Croatia
- Operation Schach 1944 - Axis anti-partisan operation in the Kordun and Banija regions in the Independent State of Croatia
- Operation Schlüsselblume 1944 - Axis anti-partisan operation in western Slavonia in the Independent State of Croatia
- Operation Schneegestöber 1944 - German operation to find and capture Josip Broz Tito's headquarters in Yugoslavia
- Operation Schneeschmelze 1944 - Axis anti-partisan operation in the Zaprešić–Krapinske Toplice–Klanjec area in the Independent State of Croatia
- Operation Sonnenaufgang 1944 - German attack on Allied units at Anzio, Italy
- Operation Steinadler 1944 - German anti-partisan operation in Eastern Greece
- Operation Steinbock 1944 - German bombing of London and Southern England, Britain
- Operation Steinschlag 1944 - Axis anti-partisan operation near Otočac and Vrhovine in the Independent State of Croatia
- Operation Storch 1944 - German flooding of parts of the Netherlands to hinder Allied advance; previously named Operation Heide
- Operation Student 1944 - German plan to restore Benito Mussolini's power in Italy
- Operation Stösser 1944 - German airborne drop behind Allied lines; part of Wacht am Rhein
- Operation Süd 1944 - German deceptive operation at Nettuno, Italy
- Operation Tanne Ost 1944 - German attack on the island of Hogland in the Baltic Sea from Finland
- Operation Tanne West 1944 - German planned invasion of Åland in the Baltic Sea from Finland
- Operation Treibjagd 1944 - German anti-partisan operation in Yugoslavia
- Operation Treuebruch 1944 - German occupation of the Bulgarian-held Skopje region of Macedonia, Yugoslavia
- Operation Trojanisches Pferd 1944 - German occupation of Budapest, Hungary; part of Operation Margarethe I
- Operation Trolist 1944 - Axis anti-partisan operation in the Zaistovec–Preseka region in the Independent State of Croatia
- Operation Uljan 1944 - German anti-partisan operation on the island of Ugljan off the coast of the Independent State of Croatia
- Operation Ungewitter 1944 - Axis anti-partisan operation in the Papuk Mountains in the Independent State of Croatia
- Operation Verrat 1944 - German attack on forces of Dragoljub Mihailovic in Yugoslavia
- Operation Verrat 1944 - German attack on forces of Napoleon Zervas in Greece
- Wacht am Rhein 1944 - German offensive in the Ardennes; Anglicized as 'Watch on the Rhine'
- Operation Waldrausch 1944 - German anti-partisan operation in the Balkans
- Operation Walküre 1944 - German attempt to overthrow Adolf Hitler, written under the cover of a plan to foil potential worker rebellions; Anglicized as 'Valkyre'
- Operation Walzertraum 1944 - German landing on the island of Hvar off the coast of Croatia, Yugoslavia; part of Operation Herbstgewitter III and Operation Herbstgewitter IV
- Operation Weststurm 1944 - German naval bombardment of Sworbe, Estonia
- Operation Wikinger 1944 - German offensive on the islands off the Dalmatian coast of Yugoslavia
- Operation Wildsau 1944 - Axis anti-partisan operation west of the railroad connecting Đurmanec and Krapinske Toplice in the Independent State of Croatia
- Operation Wintergewitter 1944 - Axis attack on the US Army in the Apennine Mountains, Italy
- Operation Winterende 1944 - German anti-partisan operation in Slovenia, Yugoslavia; part of Operation Frühlingsanfang
- Operation Wintermärchen 1944 - German offensive on American troops in Italy
- Operation Wulf 1944 - German anti-partisan operation in Thessaloniki, Greece
- Operation Zeppelin 1944 - German failed operation to destroy power plants in Moscow, USSR
- Operation Zumberak IV 1944 - Axis anti-partisan operation in the Plesivica Mountains in the Independent State of Croatia

== 1945 ==
- Operation Aktion 24 1945 - German aborted planned suicide aerial attack on bridges over the Vistula river in attempt to disrupt Soviet supply lines
- Operation Alpenfestung 1945 - German plan for a redoubt in the German Alps
- Operation Bergwind 1945 - Axis anti-partisan operation at the Moslavacka Mountains southeast of Zagreb in the Independent State of Croatia
- Operation Birkhahn 1945 - German evacuation of Norway
- Operation Bodenplatte 1945 - German air raid against Allied airbases in the Netherlands and Belgium in support of Wacht am Rhein
- Operation Caesar 1945 - Failed transfer of technical design plans and strategic materials from Germany to Japan, using submarine U-864
- Operation Clausewitz 1945 - German defense plan for the city of Berlin.
- Operation Freiheit 1945 - German destruction of a bridge on the Oder River
- Operation Frühlingserwachen 1945 - German counter-offensive against Soviet troops near Budapest, Hungary
- Operation Frühlingssturm 1945 - Axis anti-partisan operation along the Danube River in the Independent State of Croatia
- Operation Gertraud 1945 - German planned aerial bombing of hydropower plants east of Moscow, USSR
- Operation Hannibal 1945 - German evacuation of East Prussia, Germany
- Operation Hermann 1945 - German attack on British air units in Belgium and the Netherlands
- Operation Konrad 1945 - Axis attack near Budapest, Hungary to relieve the surrounded city
- Operation Lawine 1945 - Axis anti-partisan operation in the Lašva Valley and Travnik the Independent State of Croatia
- Operation Maigewitter 1945 - German anti-partisan operation in Tuzla in Bosnia, Yugoslavia
- Operation Nordwind 1945 - German offensive in Alsace and Lorraine in north-eastern France in conjunction with Wacht am Rhein
- Operation Regenbogen 1945 - German rescinded planned order to scuttle German ships at the end of the war
- Operation Regenwurm 1945 - German plan to move V-2 rockets to avoid Allied air strikes
- Operation Schneeman 1945 - German offensive in the Netherlands in conjunction with Wacht am Rhein
- Operation Sonnenwende 1945 - German attack of Soviet troops in Choszczno, Pomerania, Germany
- Operation Südwind 1945 - German counter-offensive from Esztergom, Hungary
- Operation Waldteufel 1945 - German anti-partisan operation in Budapest, Hungary
- Operation Werewolf 1945 - German anti-partisan operation in Croatia, Yugoslavia
- Operation Werewolf 1945 - German fighter deployment against Allied bombing
- Operation Zahnarzt 1945 - German operation in the area of Molsheim, France, and Zabern, Germany
