= List of military operations on the Eastern Front of World War II =

This is a list of military operations in Europe on the Eastern Front of World War II. These were operations by Germany and its allies on one side and the Soviet Union and its allies on the other and were a consequence of the German invasion in 1941. The geographic boundaries have blurred edges. Finland, classed elsewhere as a "Nordic" country, participated in Barbarossa but later fought against German troops (see Military operations in Scandinavia and Iceland during World War II). Yugoslavia, for much of the war, was part of operations in southern Europe but it was liberated by the Red Army. In the cases of Finland and Yugoslavia, therefore, operations are likely to be entered in different lists, depending on the protagonists - not geography. Soviet operations in Iran will be listed in the List of World War II military operations.

== Eastern Front ==
=== Axis ===
In alphabetic order

- Aktion 24 (1945) (Germany) — largely unsuccessful attempts to use Mistels and explosive-laden Do 24s to destroy strategic river bridges
- Aster (1944) (Germany) — withdrawal from Estonia.
- Barbarossa ("Red Beard" was the nickname for Emperor Frederick I) (1941) (Germany) (Italy) (Kingdom of Romania) (Kingdom of Hungary (1920–1946)) (Slovak Republic (1939–1945)) (Finland) — invasion of the Soviet Union.
  - Haifisch ("Shark") (1941) (Germany) — deception operation for Barbarossa, feint on Scotland and north-east England from Norway.
  - Harpune ("Harpoon") (1941) (Germany) — deception operation for Barbarossa, feint on southern England from France.
  - München ("Munich") (1941) (Germany) (Romania) — joint German-Romanian offensive of Bessarabia and Northern Bukovina.
  - Taifun ("Typhoon") (1941) (Germany) — offensive to capture Moscow before winter.
- Beowulf I & II (Heroic figure) (1941) (Germany) — two separate plans to assault the Estonian islands of Saaremaa, Hiiumaa and Muhu
  - Nordwind ("Northern wind") (1941) (Germany) (Finland) — Diversionary plan for Beowulf II
    - Lel (1941) (Germany) — sub-plan of Nordwind
    - Nau (1941) (Germany) — sub-plan of Nordwind
    - Stimmung ("Tendency") (1941) (Germany) — sub-plan of Nordwind
  - Siegfried (Heroic figure)(1941) (Germany) — German assault on Hiiumaa
    - Ost ("East") (1941) (Germany) — sub-plan of Siegfried
    - Mitte ("Middle") (1941) (Germany) — sub-plan of Siegfried
    - West (1941) (Germany) — sub-plan of Siegfried
  - Südwind ("Southern wind") (1941) (Germany) — Diversionary plan for Beowulf II
  - Weststurm ("Western Storm") (1941) (Germany) — naval bombardment in support of Beowulf II
  - Westwind (1941) (Germany) — Diversionary plan for Beowulf II
  - Edelweiss (1942) (Germany) — advance through the Caucasus to the Baku oil fields and Black Sea coast
  - Kreml ("Kremlin") (1942) (Germany) — deception operation to conceal southern offensive
- BLAU ("BLUE") (1942) (Germany) — Umbrella name for drive towards southern Soviet Union.
  - Blücher ("after Gebhard Leberecht von Blücher") (1942) (Germany) (Romania) — campaign into the Caucasus
  - Braunschweig ("Brunswick") (1942) (Germany) — drive towards Stalingrad and the Caucasus.
    - Fischreiher ("Heron") (1942) (Germany) — offensive to capture Stalingrad.
    - Hubertus (1942) (Germany) — attack against Stalingrad
      - Wintergewitter ("Winter Storm") (1942) (Germany) (Romania) — attempt to relieve encircled 6th Army at Stalingrad by Army Group Don.
      - Donnerschlag ("Thunderclap") (1942) (Germany) — planned breakout of the Sixth Army.
      - Dietrich (1942) (Germany) — planned counter-attack to relieve Sixth Army using SS panzer divisions Grossdeutschland & Leibstandarte Adolf Hitler. Unimplemented.
- Delphin ("Dolphin") (1943) (Germany) — German withdrawal from Saaremaa, Estonia.
- Eisenhammer ("Iron Hammer") (1943) (Germany) — abandoned plan to attack Soviet power plants power generators near Moscow and Gorky, using Mistel composite aircraft, abandoned in 1945.
- Eisstoss ("Ice Push") (1941) (Germany) — Luftwaffe raids on Soviet warships near Leningrad including;
  - Froschlaich ("FrogSpawn") (1941) - air raids against Soviet Navy yards at Leningrad, USSR; part of Operation Eisstoss
  - Götz v. Berlichingen (a knight in the Swabian War) (1941) - air raids against Soviet Navy at Leningrad, USSR; part of Operation Eisstoss
- Feuerzauber ("Fire Magic") (1942) (Germany) — planned capture of Leningrad
- Flamingo (1942) (Germany) — planting of Mishinskii as German agent in Soviet military hierarchy
- Frühlingserwachen ("Spring Awakening") (1945) (Germany) — counterattack against Soviets in Hungary. Last major offensive on Eastern Front.
- Hannibal (1945) (Germany) — evacuation of East Prussia
- Joseph (1944) (Germany) — proposal to destroy electricity supplies to Moscow
- Konrad (1945) (Germany) (Hungary) — German-Hungarian efforts to relieve the encircled garrison in Budapest
- Laura (1944) (Germany) — proposed evacuation of Courland
- Margarethe (1944) (Germany) — military operation to keep Hungary from defecting
- Narwa I II III (1942/43) (Germany) — sabotage operations behind Soviet lines
- Nordlicht ("Northern Lights") (1942) (Germany) — planned assault on Leningrad —
- Polikov (1942/43) (Germany) — sabotage operations behind Soviet lines
- Rennstrecke (1944) (Germany) — planned air supply of German troops isolated behind Soviet lines (later found out as a Soviet deception)
- Salzsee (1944) (Germany) — sabotage operations in Kalmykia, USSR
- Schamil (1942) (Germany) —
- Sonnenwende ("Winter Solstice") (1945) (Germany) — offensive in Pomerania to stall the advance on Berlin
- Südwind ("South Wind") (1945) (Germany) — offensive in Hungary to eliminate the Soviet bridgehead west of the Garam
- Trappenjagd ("Bustard Hunt") (1942) (Germany) (Romania) — offensive in the Kerch Peninsula
- Wilddieb (1944) (Germany) — RSHA operation to monitor radio traffic from isolated German troops
- Wolf (1942/43) (Germany) — sabotage operations behind Soviet lines
- Wunderland ("Wonderland") (1942) (Germany) —
- Zauberflöte (1943) (Germany) — Joint Wehrmacht / SS Police security operation in Minsk, Belarus
- Zitadelle ("Citadel") (1943) (Germany) — failed major offensive against the Kursk salient

=== Soviet Union ===
Operations listed here are some of the better known strategic operations of the Red Army in World War II, and exclude operations by partisans or "Home Armies". These are included under List of World War II military operations. Names of other operations have not been recorded and these have become known by their regional objective.

In alphabetic order

- Bagration (1944) (Soviet Union) — successful large-scale offensive in Belorussia.
- Belgrade Offensive (1944) (Soviet Union) — successful offensive to disrupt the German occupation of Yugoslavia and seize Belgrade.
- Battle of Berlin (1945) (Soviet Union) — successful offensive to take Berlin.
- Bratislava–Brno Offensive (1945) (Soviet Union) — successful offensive to take Bratislava and Brno.
- Budapest Offensive (1944) & (1945) (Soviet Union) — successful offensive to take Budapest.
- Iskra ("Spark") (1943) (Soviet Union) — successful Soviet counter-offensive around Leningrad
- Jassy–Kishinev Offensive (August 1944) (Soviet Union) — successful offensive causing Romania to switch allegiance to the Allies.
- Kutuzov (1943) (Soviet Union) — attack on 2nd Panzer Army, in Orel region north of the Kursk salient
- Lyuban (1942) (Soviet Union) — failed attempt to relieve Leningrad.
- Mars (1942) (Soviet Union) — failed major offensive against Rzhev salient
  - Jupiter (1942) (Soviet Union) — second phase of failed major offensive against Rzhev salient.
- Polar Star (1943) (Soviet Union) — offensive to destroy Army Group North.
- Polkovodets Rumyantsev (1943) (Soviet Union) — defeat of Army Group South's 4th Panzer Army and Army Detachment Kempf.
- Prague Offensive (1945) (Soviet Union) — Soviet offensive in final stages of World War II
- Ring (1943) (Soviet Union) — Destruction of the encircled army at Stalingrad.
- Samland (1945) (Soviet Union) — capture of Königsberg.
- Saturn (1942) (Soviet Union) — Proposed major attack following the Stalingrad encirclement; revised to Little Saturn.
- Sinyavino (1941) & (1942) (Soviet Union) — separate failed Soviet attempts to relieve Leningrad
- Suvorov (1943) (Soviet Union) — recapture of Spas-Demensk, El’nia, Roslavl’, and Smolensk.
- Uranus (1942) (Soviet Union) — successful Soviet encirclement of German Sixth Army in Stalingrad.
- Vienna Offensive (1945) (Soviet Union) — successful offensive to take Vienna.
- Vistula–Oder Offensive (1945) (Soviet Union) — successful offensive in Poland and Germany from the Vistula to the Oder.

== See also ==
- List of World War II military operations
- Operation Unthinkable
- Strategic operations of the Red Army in World War II
