= Fall Weiss =

Strategic plan for Nazi Germany's invasion of Poland

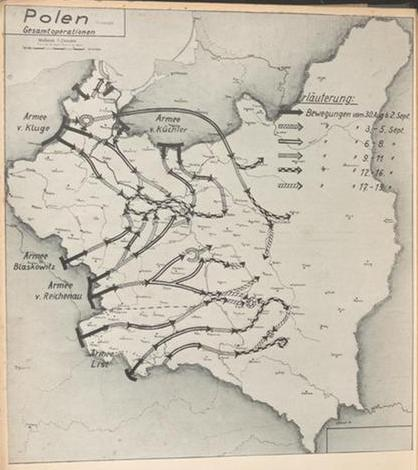
German invasion plan for Poland

Fall Weiss ("Case White", "Plan White"; German spelling Fall Weiß) was the German strategic plan for the invasion of Poland. The German military High Command finalized its operational orders on 15 June 1939 and the invasion commenced on 1 September, precipitating World War II.

== Background ==
The origins of the plan went back to 1928, when Werner von Fritsch started working on it. Fall Weiss was developed primarily by Günther Blumentritt and Erich von Manstein while the two were serving as staff officers under General Gerd von Rundstedt with Army Group South in Silesia.

== Details ==
The plan called for a start of hostilities before the declaration of war. Wehrmacht units were to invade Poland from three directions:

- A primary attack from the German mainland across the western border of Poland.
- A secondary attack from the north, from the exclave of East Prussia.
- A tertiary attack by German and allied Slovak units across the border of Slovakia.

All three assaults were to converge on Warsaw while the main Polish army was to be encircled and destroyed west of the Vistula River.

The plan was initiated on 1 September 1939 and was the first European military operation of World War II.

== See also ==
- Plan Zachód for the Polish defence plan
- German order of battle for Operation Fall Weiss
- List of Axis operational codenames in the European Theatre

Other German plans named for colors:

- Fall Rot ("Case Red") (1940) – planned defense against an incursion by France following a German invasion of Czechoslovakia.
- Fall Grün (Czechoslovakia) ("Case Green") (1938) – planned invasion of Czechoslovakia.
- Fall Gelb ("Case Yellow") (1940) – also known as the "Manstein Plan", the offensive against the BeNeLux States and France.
- Fall Grün (Ireland) ("Case Green") (1940) – planned invasion of Ireland.
- Fall Blau ("Case Blue") (1942) – summer offensive on the Eastern Front in southern Russia.
- Operation Weiss ("Operation White") (1943) – joint Axis operation against Partisans throughout occupied Yugoslavia.
