= Operation Panther =

Operation Panther may refer to:

- Operation Panther (2013), a French military operation in Mali launched in February 2013
- Operation Panther (1940), German attack on Greece
- Operation Panther (1943, Yugoslavia), German anti-partisan operation at Mesovan Pass in Southeastern Croatia, Yugoslavia
- Operation Panther (1943, Greece), German anti-partisan operation in Greece
- Operation Panther (1943, USSR), German anti-partisan operation near Kursk, USSR
