= Case Brown =

1940–1945 WWII German military plans

Case Brown (German: Fall Braun) refer to German military plans in 1940 and 1945 during World War II.

== 1940 ==
In 1940 Fall Braun was the name for the military plan for the German occupation of France (1940). It consisted of German-Italian engagement along the German-French border with the intention of breaking through into France and the advancement along the French-Swiss border of the Rhône. In order to carry out the intended plan, Adolf Hitler met with the Italian dictator Benito Mussolini on 18 May 1940 in Brenner Pass, Tirol to suggest the deployment of around 20 Italian divisions in southern Germany. The relocation of troops was estimated to take between 20 and 25 days.

Fall Braun was not carried out, due to the start of Fall Gelb (English: Case Yellow) on 10 May 1940, which resulted in the occupation of Luxembourg, the Netherlands and Belgium by the German Armed Forces. By the beginning of June 1940, Fall Gelb had run its course and the north of France had also fallen into German hands. From this point, the newly planned Fall Rot (Case Red) was to take place, involving the occupation of central France from the north. From 5 June 1940, Fall Rot was successfully carried out, during which a severely attenuated variation of Fall Braun took place using only German troops. For this campaign, Army Group C was deployed, Fall Rot contrastingly having been completed by Army Groups A and B. Army Group C was successful in breaking through the main French line of defense, the Maginot Line. With the cease fire of 25 June 1940, all fighting was stopped.

== 1945 plan ==
Fall Braun also refers to a German support operation during the Battle of the Bulge (1944/1945).

== See also ==
- Battle of France
- List of Axis operational codenames in the European Theatre
