= Operation Braunschweig =

1942 German offensive on the Eastern Front of World War II

Operation Braunschweig (Brunswick), named after Braunschweig, was the German summer offensive that began on 28 June 1942. The operation was initially named Fall Blau (Case Blue), which is the common name used for the whole offensive. The name was changed from Blau to Braunschweig on 30 June. The plans following the original Case Blue (originally named Blue I and Blue II) were renamed Operation Clausewitz and Operation Dampfhammer. Clausewitz detailed the beginning of the operations of Army Group A in July 1942, Dampfhammer the follow-up operations in July 1942.

In Führer Directive No. 45, dated 23 July 1942, Adolf Hitler outlined new goals for Operation Braunschweig. The German forces were to advance towards the Caucasus (Operation Edelweiss) and Stalingrad (Operation Fischreiher).

Hitler had personally intervened in the plans for this operation, and ordered a split in Army Group South. This division of Army Group South had caused alarm in the General Staff, and Hitler was warned repeatedly about the dangers this division entailed. Complaints from the field caused Hitler to dismiss and replace the Commander of Army Group South, Field Marshal Fedor von Bock on July 15. Later studies confirmed this split to be one of the main causes for the eventual demise of the German 6th Army in Stalingrad. Hitler persisted in this division of Army Group South for strategic reasons: acquiring the oilfields in the Caucasus region and cutting Soviet supply transports along the Volga through Stalingrad.

On July 23, 1942 Hitler met with Chief of staff Lutze and SA Obergruppenführer Jüttner at the Werwolf headquarters. They discussed several events but the key discussion surrounded Directive Number 45, which was a continuance of Operation Braunschweig. In this meeting Hitler stated several directives that, “Army Group A take the Caucasus and Baku (Operation Edelweiss), while Army Group B was supposed to conquer Stalingrad and, if possible, Astrakhan (Operation Heron – Fischreiher because of the fish in the Volga River). Army Group North was instructed to conquer Leningrad (Operation Fireworks because of artillery fire).”

The directive said:

“In a campaign of little more than three weeks, the ultimate goal I had set the south wing of the eastern front have already been accomplished. Only some rather weak enemy forces belonging to the armies of Semyon Timoshenko have managed to escape the envelopment and reach the bank of the Southern Don. These will presumably receive reinforcements from the Caucasus area.
Currently the enemy is massing another army group in the Stalingrad area, where stiff resistance is to be expected.”

The directives went on to explain just what each individual army should do in the upcoming assault.

== Bibliography ==
- Domarus, Max. Speeches and proclamations, 1932–1945. Wauconda, Il: Bolchazy-Carducci Publishers Inc., 2004.
- Schramm, Percy Ernst (1963). Kriegstagebuch des Oberkommandos der Wehrmacht, 1940–1945 Teilband II. Bonn: Bernard & Graefe Verlag für Wehrwesen.
