= Operation Otto =

Nazi plan to invade the Soviet Union

Operation Otto, also known as Plan Otto, was the code name for two independent plans by Nazi Germany. The 1938 plan was to occupy Austria; the second envisaged an attack on the Soviet Union and was developed from late July 1940.

== The Two Plans ==
The original Operation Otto was the plan to occupy Austria during the Anschluss in 1938. It was named after the last crown prince of Austria-Hungary, Otto von Habsburg.

The High Command of the German Army (OKH) also used Operation Otto as the code name in July 1940 for their original plan for the invasion of the Soviet Union. The plan was later renamed Operation Barbarossa in December 1940. The Germans estimated 240 destroyed Soviet divisions, with only 60 remaining intact. With such an overwhelming margin of victory, the plan was not completed, under the assumption that the Soviet Union could never recover. During Operation Barbarossa, the Germans in reality destroyed 248 divisions, but due to the Soviet mobilization, there were an additional 220 divisions remaining, far more than the expected 60. Adolf Hitler, being haunted by the fate of Napoleon (who had taken Moscow but failed to destroy the Imperial Russian Army during the French invasion of Russia), altered the plan by placing less emphasis on the capture of Moscow and more on destroying the Red Army.
