= Operation Adler =

German Luftwaffe campaign against Britain (1940)

Operation Adler was the code name designated by the Luftwaffe for their air offensive against Great Britain in the summer of 1940. The defensive side of this operation was known as the Battle of Britain. This offensive was part of an ambitious campaign, namely the amphibious invasion of England. The Luftwaffe bore the responsibility of neutralizing the Royal Air Force (RAF) and its capability to thwart the planned invasion. Operational planners were tasked with developing a plan to systematically destroy Great Britain's ability to wage war. This strategic air offensive was only one part of the overall campaign for the eventual invasion of England. The first step in this operation would be attaining air superiority for the invading force. Hermann Göring, the Luftwaffe Commander, violated all seven 'principles of war' as stated in U.S. Army Manual FM 100-5, but still came very close to defeating the RAF. The Luftwaffe's targeting of London was seen by the British as a fatal mistake. Adlertag (Eagle Day) was the Goring designated code name for the first day of German offensive air operations aimed at destroying the RAF.

== Adlertag ==
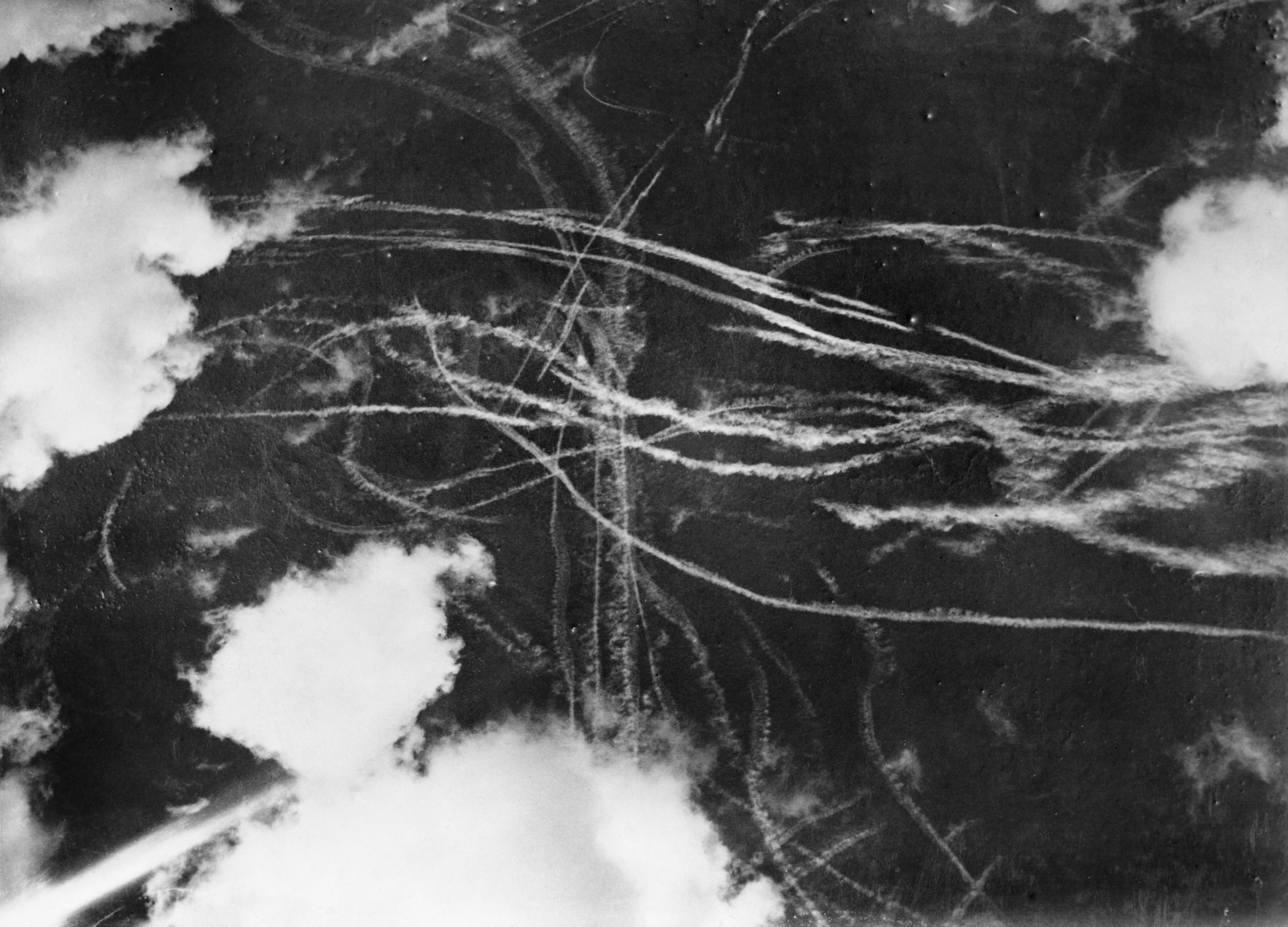
An air battle, 1940

Adlertag ("Eagle Day") was the first day of Unternehmen Adlerangriff ("Operation Eagle Attack"), an operation by Nazi Germany's Luftwaffe (air force) intended to destroy the British Royal Air Force (RAF). The operation came during the Battle of Britain after Britain rejected all overtures for a negotiated peace with Germany. However, Adlertag and subsequent operations failed to destroy the RAF or gain local air superiority.

On 16 July 1940 Hitler gave the German armed forces (Wehrmacht) Directive No. 16 ordering provisional preparations for the invasion of Britain. This operation was codenamed Operation Sea Lion (Unternehmen Seelöwe). Before this could be carried out, air superiority or air supremacy was required. The Luftwaffe was to destroy the RAF in order to prevent it from attacking the invasion fleet or providing protection for the Royal Navy's Home Fleet, which might attempt to prevent a landing by sea. On 1 August Hitler gave the Luftwaffe's commander-in-chief, Reichsmarschall Hermann Göring and the Oberkommando der Luftwaffe Directive No. 17 ("for the conduct of air and sea warfare against England") to launch the air assault.

The essential target was RAF Fighter Command. The service's destruction would deny the British their air superiority asset and feeling vulnerable to air attack might negotiate for peace. Throughout July and early August, the Germans made preparations for Adlertag. The date of the assault was postponed several times because of bad weather. Eventually, it was carried out on 13 August 1940. The German attacks on 13 August inflicted significant damage and casualties on the ground, but, marred by poor intelligence and communication, they did not significantly impair Fighter Command's ability to defend British air space.

Göring had promised Hitler that Adlertag and Adlerangriff would achieve the results required within days, or at worst weeks. It was meant to be the beginning of the end of RAF Fighter Command, but Adlertag and the following operations failed to destroy the RAF, or gain the necessary local air superiority. As a result, Operation Sea Lion was postponed indefinitely.

== Battle of Britain ==
The failure of Adlertag did not deter the Luftwaffe from continuing its campaign. The assault against RAF airfields continued throughout August and into September 1940. The battles involved large numbers of aircraft and heavy losses on both sides. The Luftwaffe failed to develop any focused strategy for defeating RAF Fighter Command. At first, it attempted to destroy RAF bases, then switched to strategic bombing by day and night. It tried to achieve the destruction of several British industries at the same time, switching from bombing aircraft factories, to attacking supporting industries, import or distribution networks such as coastal ports. An attempt was even made against unrelated targets, such as destroying the morale of the British population.

The failure of the Luftwaffe to identify the radar chain and distinguish RAF fighter bases from those of other RAF commands undermined its ability to destroy the British fighter defences. The Luftwaffe underestimated British radar, and they had not realised its importance in the British operational system. To the contrary, OKL believed that the radar stations would benefit the German effort by sending RAF forces into large-scale air battles for the Luftwaffe to decimate. The RAF aircraft industry supported the losses and its pilots were replaced sufficiently to limit the RAF's decline in strength and deny the Germans victory. Conversely, the RAF were able to ensure the serviceability rates and aircrew numbers of the Luftwaffe declined in August–September. (Note: Bungay notes that by between 27 August to 4 September 1940 that German bomber unit strength had shrunk to an average of 20 out of 35–40. Bf 109 units had declined to 18 out of 35–40 and Bf 110 units had shrunk even lower. Bungay also notes that the RAF pilot losses were 125 a week and the force was short by 150 pilots by 31 August 1940. Only 150 pilots could be replaced up to 21 September. Bomber pilots were converted to cope. Overall trend was up from July 1940. Murray focuses on German crew losses. Bf 109 units were running at 67 percent, Bf 110 units 46 percent, and bombers were at 59 percent establishment by 14 September. One week later it was 64, 52 and 52 percent respectively. It seemed that the Germans were "running out of aircraft". Wood and Dempster assert that RAF operational strength hardly declined, from 64.8 percent on 24 August to 64.7 percent on 31 August, and finally 64.25 percent on 7 September 1940.)

Having failed to defeat the RAF, the Luftwaffe adopted a different and clearer strategy of strategic bombing known as the Blitz. However, as with the campaign against the RAF, the types of targets differed radically and no sustained pressure was put under any one type of British target. Disputes among the OKL staff revolved more around tactics than strategy. This method condemned the offensive over Britain to failure before it had even begun. The end result of the air campaign against Britain in 1940 and 1941 was a decisive failure to end the war. As Hitler committed Germany to ever increasing military adventures, the Wehrmacht became increasingly overstretched and was unable to cope with a multi-front war. By 1944, the Allies were ready to launch Operation Overlord, the invasion of Western Europe. The Battle of Britain ensured that the Western Allies had a base from which to launch the campaign and that there would be a Western Allied presence on the battlefield to meet the Soviet Red Army in central Europe at the end of the war in May 1945.

== See also ==
- German Air Fleets in World War II
- List of RAF aircrew in the Battle of Britain

== Bibliography ==
- Addison, Paul; Crang, Jeremy A. (2000). The Burning Blue: A New History of the Battle of Britain. Pimlico. ISBN 978-0-7126-6475-2.
- Bungay, Stephen (2000). The Most Dangerous Enemy: A History of the Battle of Britain. Aurum Press. ISBN 978-1-85410-721-3.
- Clines, John (17 June 1994). "Operation Adler: The First Strategic Air Offensive" (Unclassified Paper). Naval War College: Defense Technical Information Center. pp. 3–35. One or more of the preceding sentences incorporates text from this source, which is in the public domain.
- Hooton, E.R. (1997). Eagle in Flames: The Fall of the Luftwaffe. Arms & Armour. ISBN 978-1-85409-343-1.
- Mackay, Ron (2003). Heinkel HE 111. Crowood Aviation Series. Ramsbury, Marlborough, Wiltshire, UK: Crowood Press UK. ISBN 978-1-86126-576-0.
- Murray, Williamson (1983). Strategy for Defeat: The Luftwaffe, 1933-1945. CADRE books. Air University Press. ISBN 978-0-16-002160-2.
- Overy, Richard J. (1980). The Air War, 1939-1945. Taylor & Francis Group. ISBN 978-0-905118-53-6.
- Parker, Matthew (2000). The Battle of Britain, July-October 1940. London: Headline. ISBN 978-0-7472-3452-4.
- Trevor-Roper, Hugh R. (2004). Hitler's War Directives 1939-1945. Battlefield Britain Series. Birlinn. ISBN 978-1-84341-014-0.
- Wood, Derek; Dempster, Derek D. (2003). The Narrow Margin: The Battle of Britain and the Rise of Air Power, 1930-1940. Pen & Sword Military Classics. ISBN 978-0-85052-915-9.
