= Operation Alpenveilchen =

Planned German military operation in 1941 to support Italy in the Greco-Italian War

During World War II, Operation Alpine Violet (German: Unternehmen Alpenveilchen) was a proposed German operation designed to help the Italians in 1941 break out of their Albanian colony and into Greece. This operation was never executed, primarily because of problems with supply and transportation.

In October 1940, the Italians invaded Greece without German help and were quickly driven back by the Greeks into retreat and into Albania. An Italian "Spring Offensive" in March 1941 made little progress and proved very costly for the few gains made.

In April 1941, the Germans launched Operation Marita (German: Unternehmen Marita) and the Italians in Albania were ultimately able to take advantage of German attacks elsewhere. By mid-April, the Greek forces in Albania were withdrawing. On 22 April, the 4th Bersaglieri Regiment crossed back into Greece.

== See also ==
- Italian invasion of Albania
- Military history of Albania during World War II
- Greco-Italian War
- Battle of Greece
