= Operation Otto (1943) =

Action of WWII

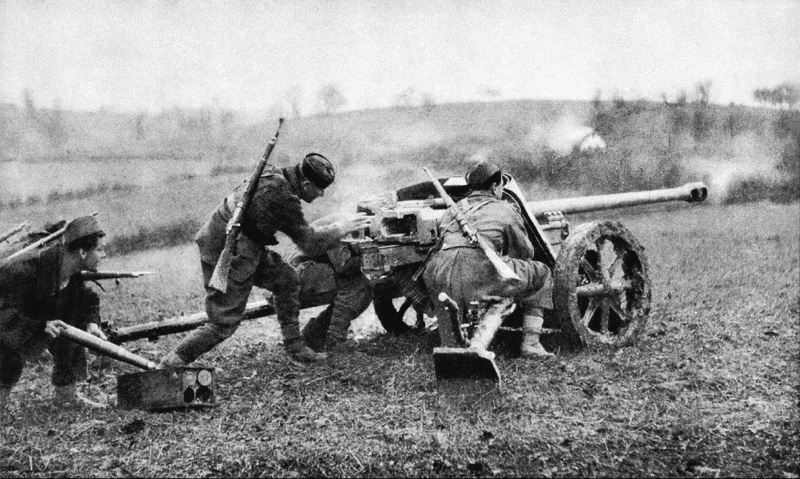
Soldiers operating a cannon.

Operation Otto was a joint operation of the Wehrmacht and NDH forces against partisans in the Grmeč area in Bosnia, Yugoslavia during the Second World War. It ran from April 19 to 21, 1943.

== The Operation ==
Operation Otto was a concentric attack from Bosanski Novi, Bosanska Krupa, Bosanski Petrovac, Ključ and Sanski Most, which began on April 20, 1943. Parts of the 114th Jäger Division (Wehrmacht), reinforced with Croat Regiments tried to destroy the 4th Partisan Infantry Division.
However, by skillfully maneuvering and infiltrating into the back of the invading forces, this division avoided destruction, and after five days the operation was stopped.

Following Operation Otto, a NOVJ force of some 900 men withdrew to the Bihać area and threatened the Bihać - Bosanska Krupa road.

== Sources ==
- This is a translation of the article in the Croatian Wikipedia, Operacija Otto.
