= Operation Clausewitz =

Defence of Berlin from Soviet troops in 1945

Operation Clausewitz (German: Fall Clausewitz) was the code word initiating the defence of Berlin by Nazi Germany during the final stage of the European Theatre of World War II. Clausewitz was established in the 9 March 1945 document, Basic Order for the Preparations for the Defense of the Reich Capital (German: Grundsätzlicher Befehl für die Vorbereitungen zur Verteidigung der Reichshauptstadt), a 33-page document containing 24 separate points. The second point of the document, in full (translated) is: "The Reich capital will be defended to the last man and to the last bullet." It has been referred to as the Nazis' last stand against the Soviets.

The document divided the city of Berlin into nine operational defense zones (A to H, as slices of the outer city of Berlin and Z, its center, corresponding to the government district). It further divided the region into four concentric rings: an outer exclusion zone, extending well past Berlin's city limits; an outer defense zone extending roughly to the city limits; an inner defense zone extending out to the Berlin Ringbahn; and the Citadel (German: Zitadelle), again, zone Z. In addition to the establishment of defense zones, this document also described the overall mechanism by which Berlin would be converted to a front line city. This included:

- The evacuation of all Wehrmacht and SS offices in Berlin
- Evacuation of the central command post of the capital from General Command on Hohenzollern to L-Tower of the Zoo bunker no more than six hours after the issuance of Clausewitz
- The imposition of martial law for the civilian populace, and offences under which the death penalty was authorized

The document also outlined the destruction of thousands of documents that were deemed "essential" to the Nazi war machine, this including documents pertaining to military and civilian logistics and installations, medical research, and other technological research.

Adolf Hitler ordered the execution of Fall Clausewitz on 20 April 1945. This set into motion preparations according to the Basic Order plan, and would have been followed later by the code word Kolberg, meaning full preparations should have been completed and the battle would have started.

== See also ==
- Carl von Clausewitz
