= Fall Grün (Czechoslovakia) =

Pre-WW2 German military plan to invade Czechoslovakia

- Part of German occupation of Czechoslovakia
- Planned: From 1937
- Objective: Destruction of Czechoslovakia
- Date: Planned for no later than 1 October 1938
- Outcome: Never carried out, as objective achieved by other means

Fall Grün (German for 'Case Green') was a pre-World War II plan for the invasion of Czechoslovakia by Nazi Germany. Although some preliminary steps were taken to destabilise Czechoslovakia, the plan was never fully realised since Nazi Germany achieved its objective by diplomatic means at the Munich Conference in September 1938, followed by the unopposed military occupation of Bohemia and Moravia and the creation of a nominally independent Slovakia, in March 1939.

Many in the German high command believed that an invasion of Czechoslovakia might prompt French and British intervention. Some also believed that there were inadequacies in the Wehrmacht, whereas others held that the invasion would succeed despite such inadequacies.

== Background ==
The plan was first drafted in June 1937 and subsequently revised as the military situation and requirements changed, such as after the annexation of Austria by Nazi Germany in March 1938. Following the May Crisis war scare of that year, when Germany was perceived to have backed down in response to warnings from Czechoslovakia’s allies, France and Britain, the plan acquired a target date scheduling the attack for no later than 1 October 1938. The directive, signed by Adolf Hitler on 30 May 1938, indicated it was his "unalterable decision" to destroy Czechoslovakia in the near future.

Czechoslovakia's principal ally, France, in conjunction with Britain, pursued a policy of "Appeasement" towards Nazi Germany, culminating in the Munich Agreement, signed on 30 September 1938. The agreement, between the leaders of Britain, France, Germany and Italy, transferred the mainly German-inhabited regions of the country (known as the "Sudetenland") to Germany. The territory concerned contained Czechoslovakia’s strategically significant border fortifications and, as a result of the loss, the plan for a military attack was no longer relevant. The destruction of Czechoslovakia was completed in March 1939, when Slovakia became a nominally independent state under the influence of Nazi Germany. The remaining western parts of Czechoslovakia were occupied by Germany and became the Protectorate of Bohemia and Moravia.

The name Fall Grün was later assigned to the plans for an invasion of Ireland.

== Plan of attack ==
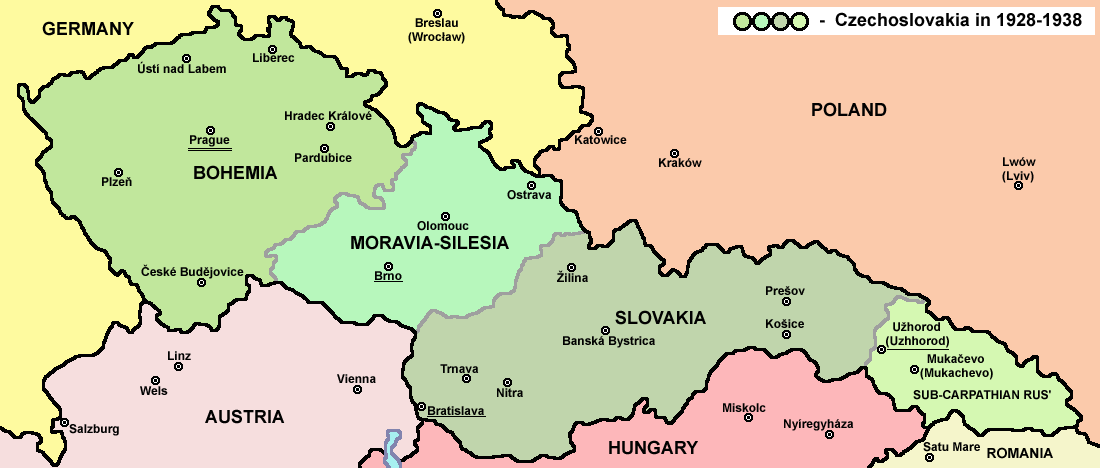
Czechoslovakia, 1918–1938 (In March 1938, Austria was annexed by Germany.)

In addition to specific military assignments, the directive for Fall Grün also focussed on political preparations. The Czechoslovak authorities were to be intimidated by belligerent threats from Nazi Germany and the ethnic German minority population within the country organised to support the military operations. An incident would be staged to provide a pretext for opening hostilities. Attention was also to be given to encouraging Poland and Hungary to pursue their territorial claims against Czechoslovakia.

The military campaign was to emphasise speed of action and an element of surprise. The aim of the army, in coordination with the air force, was to stage a surprise attack, penetrating and outflanking the border defences adjacent to Germany. The attack was to be carried out by five army formations massed along the western borders of Czechoslovakia. The main thrust of the campaign would come from the west, into Bohemia, in the direction of Plzeň and Prague. Simultaneously, a pincer movement in Moravia, from the north towards Olomouc and the south towards Brno, would prevent the withdrawal of the Czechoslovak army eastwards into Slovakia. Even the Danube flotilla would be brought into action in support of the army. With future armed conflict in mind, the directive also required, wherever possible, for Czechoslovakia’s industrial capacity to be preserved.

== Political pressure ==
A significant role in the preparatory stages of the campaign was played by the radicalised section of the ethnic German minority population in Czechoslovakia organised in the Sudeten German Party (SdP), which emulated the characteristics of the Nazi Party in neighbouring Germany. The leader of the party, Konrad Henlein, received instruction from Hitler in Berlin, in March 1938, to create an atmosphere of tension in dealings with the Czechoslovak authorities by making unacceptable demands for major political reforms, but without the intention of reaching a settlement before Germany was ready for military action. As the sense of crisis heightened during the course of the year, Czechoslovakia’s western allies, Britain in particular, applied strong pressure on the president of Czechoslovakia, Edvard Beneš, and his government to reach an accommodation with the SdP by conceding to their demands.

== Undeclared German-Czechoslovak war ==
Following a bellicose speech by Hitler in Nuremberg on 12 September 1938, during which he complained of the “intolerable” oppression of Czechoslovakia’s ethnic German population, unrest broke out in the Sudetenland. When Czechoslovak forces intervened and imposed martial law, the SdP leadership fled across the border into Germany. It was from there that Henlein announced, on 17 September 1938, the formation of a paramilitary force, the Sudetendeutsches Freikorps, which, armed and trained in Germany, began conducting cross-border attacks against targets in Czechoslovakia. Although the Munich Agreement, in effect, ended any prospect of immediate Czechoslovak military resistance, Beneš, as president of the Czechoslovak government-in-exile based in Britain during the Second World War, later officially designated 17 September 1938 as the start date of the undeclared war between Germany and Czechoslovakia.

== See also ==
- List of Axis operational codenames in the European Theatre
