= Razboj Župski =

Župski Razboj
- Village
- Location within Bosnia and Herzegovina
- Coordinates: 44°58′06″N 17°33′12″E
- Country: Bosnia and Herzegovina
- Republic: Republika Srpska
- Municipality: Srbac
- Time zone: UTC+1 (CET)
  - Summer (DST): UTC+2 (CEST)

Župski Razboj (Serbian: Жупски Разбој) is a village in the municipality of Srbac, Republika Srpska, Bosnia and Herzegovina.
