= Operation Donnerschlag =

Plan of the German 6th Army to break out in the Battle of Stalingrad in World War II

During World War II, the German military planned or undertook an operation named Donnerschlag ("Thunderclap" in German).

The December 1942 German Army plan called for a breakout from the besieged city of Stalingrad (now Volgograd) by the German Sixth Army and there meet up with the relief Operation Wintergewitter. Donnerschlag was to be the code word for the commencement of Operation Wintergewitter. The operation was downgraded and converted into a defensive stance after Hermann Göring's boast that the Luftwaffe would resupply the surrounded troops at Stalingrad. This effort eventually failed, and the Sixth Army, encircled by the Red Army as a result of Operation Uranus, surrendered in early February 1943.
