= Operation Delphin =

Military operation of WWII

Operation Delphin was an anti-partisan operation in the Independent State of Croatia that took place in World War II, from 15 November to 1 December 1943. The objective of the mission was to destroy the Partisan elements on the Dalmatian islands off central Dalmatia.

The Axis forces included:

- 114th Jäger Division (main force)
- 264th Infantry Division (elements)
- Küstenjäger-Abteilung (Coastal Raiders Battalion) "Brandenburg"
- DKM Flak cruiser Niobe, 1 destroyer, several gunboats, 2 armed steamers, 3 Siebel ferries, and numerous smaller ships, boats and landing craft.

== Result ==
The operation, which was amphibious, ran relatively according to plan, but most of the Partisans appear to have avoided engaging the German forces. Some of them escaped to the island of Vis further out into the Adriatic. The operation was not thought to be very successful.
