= Operation Haifisch =

German cover operation in WW2

Operation Haifisch (Shark) was a German codename for the cover operation against the United Kingdom in World War II, intended (like Operation Harpune) to conceal preparations for Operation Barbarossa, the invasion of the Soviet Union.

Elaborated by Wilhelm Keitel and designated to begin in April 1941, the aim was to strike at England's southern coast in four places between Folkestone and Worthing. The Kriegsmarine's main task was to ferry the invasion forces after loading them at major ports between Cherbourg and Rotterdam.

== See also ==
- Operation Sea Lion
- Operation Harpune
