= Operation Harpune =

German cover operation in WW2

In World War II, Operation Harpune (Harpoon) was the major German deception plan of 1941. This operation (like Operation Haifisch) portrayed the so-called Operation Seelowe ("Sealion") as inevitable, to conceal preparations for the invasion of the Soviet Union, called Operation Barbarossa. Harpune had two parts, Harpune Süd (Harpoon South) operated from Norway, Denmark, and France, while Harpune Nord (Harpoon North) did the same in Norway.
