= Operation Blücher =

German army operations

Operation Blücher refers to several German army operations named after Prussian Field Marshal Blücher:

- Operation Blücher, a World War I alternative plan to Heilger Michael. It called for an attack on Allied forces near the Aisne River, scheduled for spring 1918. It is also known as Third Battle of the Aisne - see German spring offensive.
- Operation Blücher, a World War II attack from the Crimean Peninsula across the Kerch Straits into the Caucasus, as part of Operation Blau. It was executed in a much smaller-than-planned form on 2 September 1942.
- Operation Blücher, the last German offensive operation in France during World War II, during the Siege of Dunkirk. German forces pushed the front back about 15 km before digging in and holding. Fighting continued until 4 May 1945, and the lines were held until 9 May 1945.

== Sources ==
- Stacey, Colonel C. P.; Bond, Major C. C. J. (1960). The Victory Campaign: The operations in North-West Europe 1944–1945 (PDF). Official History of the Canadian Army in the Second World War. Vol. III. The Queen's Printer and Controller of Stationery Ottawa. OCLC 606015967. Archived from the original (PDF) on 21 December 2020.
