= 6th Army (Wehrmacht) =

German field army (1939–1945)

- 6. Armee
- Active: 10 October 1939 – 2 February 1943; 5 March 1943 – 9 May 1945
- Country: Germany
- Branch: German Army (Heer)
- Type: Field army
- Size: Battle of Stalingrad 1942/43: 360,000 –124,000 (18 December 1942–February 1943 March 11,000 soldiers); 9 October 1943 (Battle of the Dnieper): 217,857; 1 February 1944 (Nikopol-Krivoy Rog Offensive): 260,000; 1 March 1944 (Bereznegovatoye–Snigirevka Offensive): 286,297; 1 April 1944 (Odessa Offensive): 188,551
- Engagements: World War II; Battle of Belgium; Battle of Gembloux (1940); Battle of France; Case Yellow; Case Red; Operation Barbarossa; Battle of Uman; Battle of Kiev (1941); First Battle of Kharkov; Second Battle of Kharkov; Case Blue; Operation Fischreiher; Battle of Voronezh; Battle of Kalach; Battle of Stalingrad; Donbass Offensive (July 1943); Donbass Offensive (August 1943); Battle of the Dnieper; Melitopol Offensive; Dnieper–Carpathian Offensive; Nikopol–Krivoi Rog Offensive; Bereznegovatoye–Snigirevka Offensive; Odessa Offensive; Battle of Romania; Second Jassy-Kishinev Offensive; Budapest Offensive; Siege of Budapest; Operation Konrad; Operation Spring Awakening; Vienna Offensive

Commanders
- Notable commanders: Walther von Reichenau; Friedrich Paulus; Maximilian Fretter-Pico; Hermann Balck

The 6th Army (German: 6. Armee) was a field army of the German Army during World War II. It is widely known for its defeat by and subsequent surrender to the Red Army at the Battle of Stalingrad on 2 February 1943. It committed war crimes at Babi Yar while under the command of Field Marshal Walther von Reichenau during Operation Barbarossa.

The 6th Army was reformed in March 1943, and participated in fighting in Ukraine and later Romania, before being almost completely destroyed in the Second Jassy-Kishinev Offensive in August 1944. Following this it would fight in Hungary, attempting to relieve Budapest, and subsequently retreating into Austria in the Spring of 1945. 6th Army surrendered to US Army forces on 9 May 1945.

== Western campaigns ==
The 6th Army was formed on 10 October 1939 with General Walther von Reichenau in command through the redesignation of the 10th Army that had fought during the Invasion of Poland.

During the invasion of the Low Countries the 6th Army saw active service linking up with paratroopers and destroying fortifications at Eben Emael, Liège, and Namur during the Battle of Belgium. The 6th Army was then involved in the breakthrough of the Paris defences on 12 June 1940, before acting as a northern flank for German forces along the Normandy coast during the closing stages of the Battle of France.

Three Infantry Divisions of the 6th Army, based in the Cherbourg Peninsula, were scheduled to land in the area of Lyme Bay during Operation Sea Lion, the planned German invasion of the UK.

== Eastern Front, 1941–43 ==
The 6th Army took part in Operation Barbarossa as the spearhead of Army Group South. Reichenau died in an aircraft accident while being transported to a hospital after a heart attack in January 1942. He was succeeded by his former chief of staff, General Friedrich Paulus. Paulus led the 6th Army to a major victory at the Second Battle of Kharkov during the spring of 1942.

=== Case Blue ===
The Soviet counter-attack at Stalingrad German front, 19 November German front, 12 December German front, 24 December Soviet advance, 19–28 November

On 28 June 1942, Army Group South launched Case Blue, the German Army's summer offensive into southern Russia. The goals of the operation were to secure both the oil fields at Baku, Azerbaijan, and the city of Stalingrad on the river Volga to protect the forces advancing into the Caucasus.

=== Battle of Stalingrad ===
Two months after the beginning of Case Blue, the 6th Army reached the outskirts of Stalingrad on 23 August. On the same day, over 1,000 aircraft of the Luftflotte 4 bombed the city, killing many civilians.

Stalingrad was defended by the 62nd Army (Soviet Union) under the command of General Vasily Chuikov. Despite German air superiority over Stalingrad, and with more artillery pieces than the Red Army, progress was reduced to no more than several meters a day. Eventually, by mid November, the 62nd Army had been pushed to the banks of the Volga, but the 6th Army was unable to eliminate the remaining Soviet troops.

On 19 November the Stavka launched Operation Uranus, a major offensive by Soviet forces on the flanks of the German army. The first pincer attacked far to the west of the Don, with the second thrust beginning a day later attacking far to the south of Stalingrad. The 6th Army's flanks were protected by Romanian troops, who were quickly routed, and on 23 November, the pincers met at Kalach-na-Donu, thereby encircling the 6th Army. A relief attempt was launched on 12 December by Hermann Hoth's 4th Panzer Army, codenamed Operation Winter Storm. Despite initial progress, capturing the town of Verkhne-Kumsky and reaching the river Myshkova, the 4th Panzer Army was eventually halted and later forced to withdraw due to the threat posed to its rear by Operation Little Saturn. Also contributing to Winter Storm's failure was Adolf Hitler's refusal to approve of Operation Thunderclap, a planned breakout attempt by the 6th Army, to occur simultaneously.

The 6th Army surrendered between 31 January and 2 February 1943. German casualties were 147,200 killed and wounded and over 91,000 captured, the latter including Field Marshal Paulus, 24 generals and 2,500 officers of lesser rank. Only 5,000 would survive Soviet internment and return to Germany after the war.

== Redeployment ==
A new 6th Army was deployed by renaming Armee-Abteilung Hollidt on 5 March 1943 under the command of General Karl-Adolf Hollidt.

This new 6th Army later fought in Ukraine and Romania as part of Army Group South until transferred to Army Group A (later renamed to Army Group South Ukraine). In May 1944, the 6th Army became part of Army Group Dumitrescu, commanded by the Romanian general Petre Dumitrescu. The Army Group also included the Romanian 3rd Army. This instance marked the first time in the war when German commanders came under the actual (instead of nominal) command of their foreign allies. This came one month after Dumitrescu became the 5th non-German recipient of the Knight's Cross of the Iron Cross with Oak Leaves (4 April 1944). The 6th army was encircled and almost entirely destroyed during the Second Jassy–Kishinev Offensive carried out by the Soviets.

In October 1944, under the command of General Maximilian Fretter-Pico, the 6th Army encircled and destroyed three Soviet corps of Mobile Group Pliyev under the command of Issa Pliyev in the Battle of Debrecen. During this time, the 6th Army had the Hungarian Second Army placed under its command, and it was known as "Army Group Fretter-Pico" (Armeegruppe Fretter-Pico).

Command passed to General Hermann Balck on 23 December 1944. In December 1944, one of the 6th Army's subordinate units, the IX SS Mountain Corps, was encircled in Budapest. IV SS Panzer Corps was transferred to the 6th Army's command and a series of relief attempts, codenamed Operation Konrad, was launched during the 46-day-long Siege of Budapest.

After the failure of Konrad III, the 6th Army was made part of "Army Group Balck" (Armeegruppe Balck). This army group fell back to the area near Lake Balaton. Several units, including the III Panzer Corps, took part in Operation Spring Awakening, while the rest of the Sixth Army provided defence for the left flank of the offensive, in the region west of Székesfehérvár. After the failure of the offensive, the army held the line until the Soviet Vienna Offensive on 16 March 1945. This offensive tore a gap in the 6th Army between the IV SS Panzer Corps and the 3rd Hungarian Army (subordinated to Balck's command), shattering the formation. By the end of March 1945, the 6th Army was retreating towards Vienna. It surrendered to the U.S. Army on 9 May 1945.

== War crimes ==
=== Bila Tserkva massacre ===
Soon after the beginning of Operation Barbarossa, the Sixth Army's surgeon, the staff doctor Gerhart Panning, used Jewish POWs to study captured Russian expanding bullets. To determine the effects of this type of ammunition on German soldiers, he decided to test them on other human beings after asking SD member and SS-Standartenführer Paul Blobel for some "guinea pigs" (Jewish POWs).

In July 1941 while conducting operations in Right-bank Ukraine, the Sixth Army bloodlessly captured the Ukrainian town of Bila Tserkva. Immediately after the town's capitulation, Sixth Army police units separated the Jewish population of the town into a ghetto and required that they wear the Star of David as identification. Two weeks after the occupation, members of Einsatzgruppen marched the Jews out of the town, 800 men and women in all, to be shot. The Sixth Army provided logistical support for this massacre, providing drivers, guards, weapons and ammunition. Afterwards ninety children aged twelve and under were left, their parents having been killed the night before. A staff officer with the division that made the town their headquarters wrote of their conditions:

"The rooms were filled with about 90 children. There was an indescribable amount of filth; Rags, diapers, refuse lay everywhere. Countless flies cover the children, some of whom were naked. Almost all of the children were crying or whimpering. The stench was unbearable. In the above mentioned case, measures were taken against women and children which were no different from atrocities committed by the enemy.".

— Lieutenant Colonel Helmuth Groscurth (1941)

Groscurth himself sought out the district commander and insisted that the execution must be stopped. Sixth Army headquarters was faced with a decision on what to do with the children left behind now that their parents had been murdered. The division commander passed the decision up to Walter von Reichenau, then commander of the Sixth Army, who personally authorized the massacre. All the children were murdered by Sixth Army regulars. Groscurth, appalled by the murders, wrote to his wife that "We cannot and should not be allowed to win this war".

=== Severity Order ===
The army's commander, Walther von Reichenau, a committed, fanatical Nazi, had this to say about the expected conduct of soldiers under his command. The order said, in part

"The most important objective of this campaign against the Jewish-Bolshevik system is the complete destruction of its sources of power and the extermination of the Asiatic influence in European civilization.

In this eastern theatre, the soldier is not only a man fighting in accordance with the rules of the art of war, but also the ruthless standard bearer of a national conception and the avenger of bestialities which have been inflicted upon German and racially related nations. For this reason the soldier must learn fully to appreciate the necessity for the severe but just retribution that must be meted out to the subhuman species of Jewry. A further purpose of this retribution is the annihilation of revolts in hinterland which, as experience proves, have always been caused by Jews.

Das wesentlichste Ziel des Feldzuges gegen das jüdisch-bolschewistische System ist die völlige Zerschlagung der Machtmittel und die Ausrottung des asiatischen Einflusses im europäischen Kulturkreis.

Der Soldat ist im Ostraum nicht nur ein Kämpfer nach den Regeln der Kriegskunst, sondern auch Träger einer unerbittlichen völkischen Idee und der Rächer für alle Bestialitäten, die deutschem und artverwandtem Volkstum zugefügt wurden. Deshalb muss der Soldat für die Notwendigkeit der harten aber gerechten Sühne am jüdischen Untermenschentum volles Verständnis haben. Sie hat den weiteren Zweck, Erhebungen im Rücken der Wehrmacht, die erfahrungsgemäß stets von Juden angezettelt wurden, im Keime zu ersticken.

— Conduct of Troops in Eastern Territories

Immediately after this order was issued, Sixth Army records show a dramatic increase in shootings, rapes and massacres committed by Sixth Army constituent units. The BBC upon examining the now released records of the Sixth Army, stated that there were "so many executions, and so many victims that it was impossible to keep them a secret."

The Sixth Army confiscated large quantities of food to be used by its troops, creating acute food shortages in Ukraine. By January 1942, around one-third of the Kharkov's 300,000 remaining inhabitants suffered from starvation. Many would die in the cold winter months. Civilians survived the famine by making stews out of boiled leather and sawdust, and making omelets out of coagulated blood. Survivors bitterly remembered these "meals" for the rest of their lives.

== Commanders ==
Commanding officers

No.	Portrait	Commander	Took office	Left office	Time in office
1	Walter von Reichenau	Generalfeldmarschall; Walter von Reichenau (1884–1942)	10 October 1939	29 December 1941	2 years, 80 days
2	Friedrich Paulus	Generalfeldmarschall; Friedrich Paulus (1890–1957)	30 December 1941	31 January 1943	1 year, 32 days
3	Karl-Adolf Hollidt	Generaloberst; Karl-Adolf Hollidt (1891–1985)	5 March 1943	7 April 1944	1 year, 33 days
4	Maximilian de Angelis	General der Artillerie; Maximilian de Angelis (1889–1974)	8 April 1944	16 July 1944	99 days
5	Maximilian Fretter-Pico	General der Artillerie; Maximilian Fretter-Pico (1892–1984)	17 July 1944	22 December 1944	158 days
6	Hermann Balck	General der Panzertruppe; Hermann Balck (1893–1982)	23 December 1944	8 May 1945	136 days

Chief of staff

No.	Portrait	Chief of staff	Took office	Left office	Time in office
1	Arthur Schmidt	Generalleutnant; Arthur Schmidt (1895–1987)	15 May 1942	3 February 1943	292 days

== Bibliography ==
- Adam, Wilhelm; Ruhle, Otto (2015). With Paulus at Stalingrad. Translated by Tony Le Tissier. United Kingdom: Pen and Sword Books Ltd. ISBN 9781473833869.
- Boll, Bernd; Safrian, Hans (2004). "On the Way to Stalingrad". In Hannes Heer; Klaus Naumann (eds.). War of Extermination: The German Military in World War II. New York: Berghahn Books. pp. 237–271. ISBN 1-57181-232-6.
- Margry, Karel (2001). The Four Battles for Kharkov. London, England: Battle of Britain International.
- Shirer, William L. (1960). The Rise and Fall of the Third Reich (1st ed.). New York: Simon & Schuster. OCLC 1286630.
- Ziemke, Earl F.; Bauer, Magna E. (1987). Moscow to Stalingrad: Decision in the East. Washington D.C.: Center of Military History, US Army. ISBN 9780160019425.
- Ziemke, Earl F. (2002). Stalingrad to Berlin: The German Defeat in the East. Washington D.C.: Center of Military History, US Army. ISBN 9781780392875.
