= Operation Fischreiher =

Axis operational expansion of Case Blue

- Part of the Eastern Front of World War II
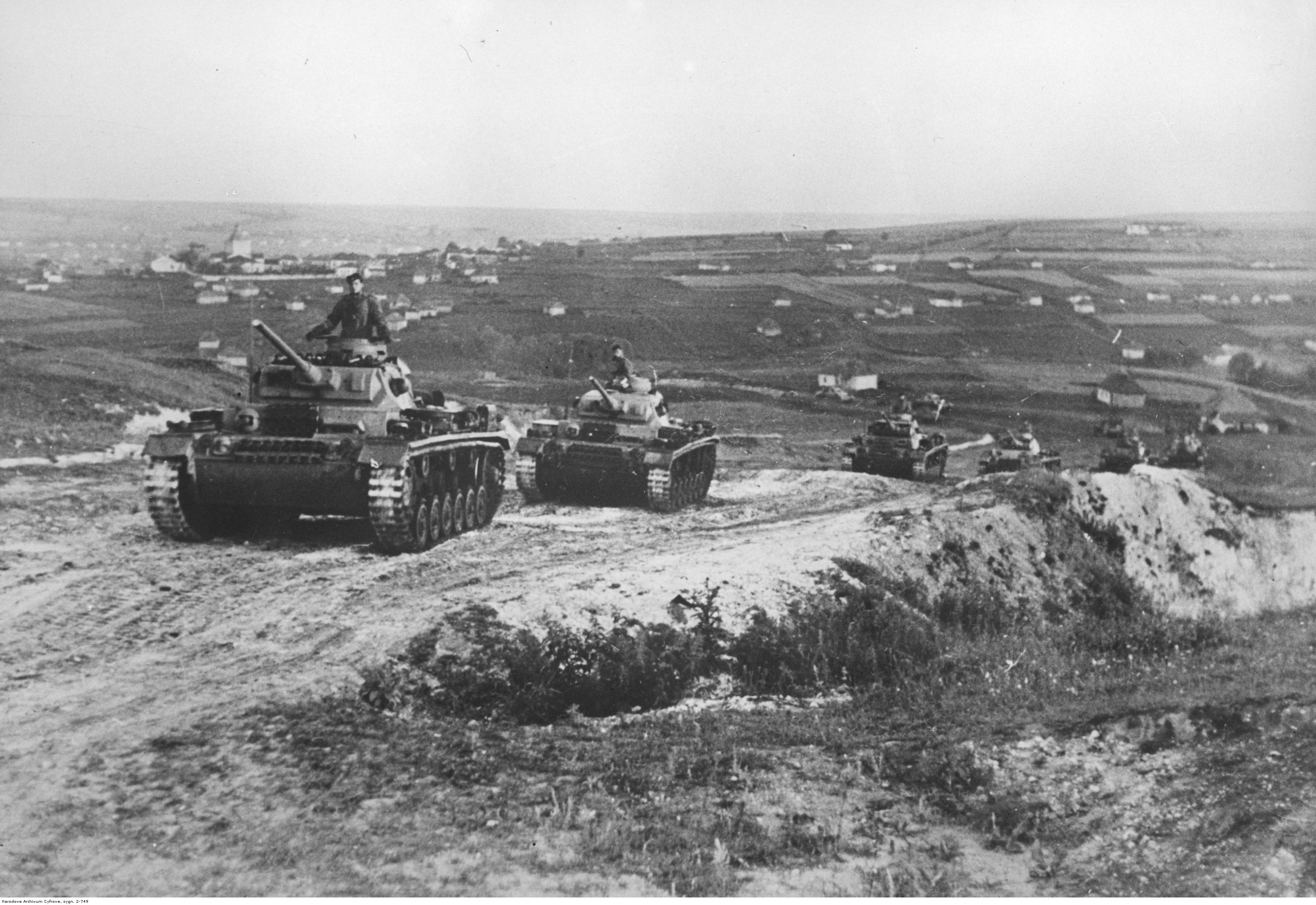
- A column of German Panzer III tanks travelling down an unpaved road near the Don River, July 1942
Date	22 July 1942
Location	Russian SFSR, Soviet Union
Result	Axis operation failure

Belligerents
Germany; Romania; Hungary; Italy	Soviet Union

Commanders and leaders
(Nazi Germany) Friedrich Paulus (6th Army) (Nazi Germany) Hermann Hoth (4th Panzer Army)	(Soviet Union) S. Timoshenko (Stalingrad Front) (Soviet Union) N.F. Vatutin (Southwest Front) (Soviet Union) A. Yeremenko (Southeast Front)

Operation Fischreiher (German for heron) was an extension of Case Blue, part of the German invasion of the Soviet Union in World War II. General Friedrich Paulus' 6th Army, and part of the 4th Panzer Army under General Hermann Hoth, was to advance across the Don river towards the city of Stalingrad on the Western bend of the Volga river.

The original operational plans had called for a defensive line on the Don river by Army Group B, while Army Group A under General List was to advance south towards the oil fields in the Caucasus. The diversion of Operation Fischreiher became an offensive in its own right, to the detriment of the drive south by Army Group A.

The 6th Army came up against the first Soviet defensive lines on August 17, and were then locked in street fighting for the next three months until they reached their offensive limit on November 18. After this date, the 6th Army and the 4th Panzer Army were on the defensive after their lines of communication with Army Group B were cut by a Soviet pincer movement from General Nikolai Vatutin's Southwestern Front and General Andrey Yeryomenko's Stalingrad Front, whose forces met in the German rear between Kalach and Sovetskiy on November 23, 1942.

== Bibliography ==
- Chant, Christopher. (1986) The encyclopedia of codenames of World War II. Routledge. ISBN 0-7102-0718-2
