= Allied occupation of Iceland =

Allied occupation of Iceland in World War II

Occupation of Iceland
- Part of World War II and the Battle of the Atlantic and the Invasion of Iceland
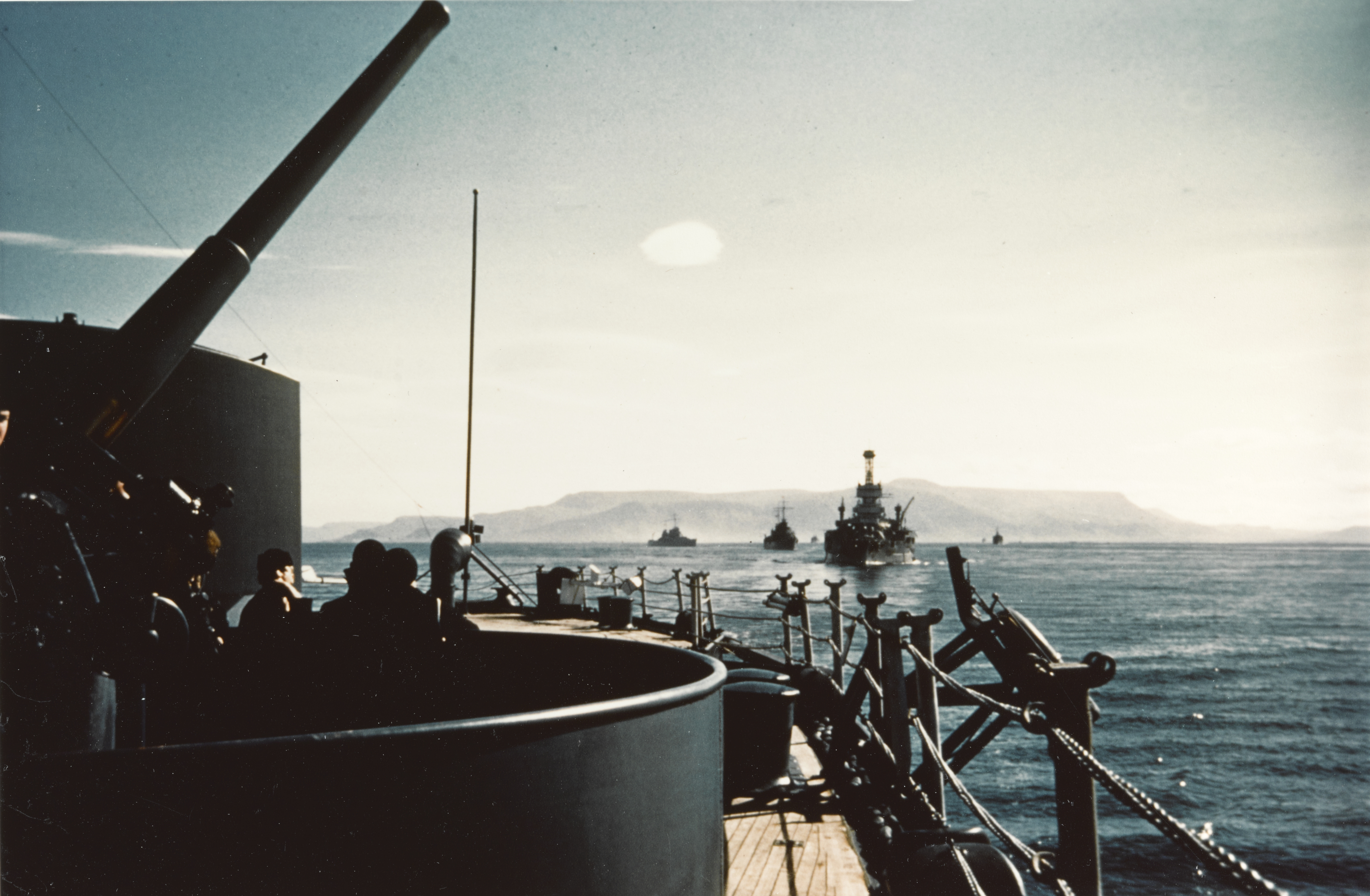
- Seen from the quarterdeck of the U.S. Navy battleship New York, U.S. Atlantic Fleet ships steam out of Reykjavík harbour at the time of the initial U.S. occupation of Iceland in early July 1941.
Date	10 May 1940 – 16 June 1940 (UK); 16 June 1940 – 7/8 July 1941 (Note: The initial Canadian forces left on 28 April 1941.) (Note: The US agreed to occupy Iceland in place of the UK on 16 June 1941. It was made official on 7 July 1941, but with US forces only landing the following day.) (UK & Canada); 7/8 July 1941 – 1945 (US)
Location	Iceland
Result	British, then American occupation for the duration of the war; Icelandic cooperation with Allied war effort

Belligerents
United Kingdom; Canada; United States	Kingdom of Iceland (until 1944); Republic of Iceland (from 1944)

Commanders and leaders
(United Kingdom) George Lammie; (Canada) Lionel Frank Page; (United States) John Marston	(Kingdom of Iceland) Hermann Jónasson; (Kingdom of Iceland) Ólafur Thors; (Kingdom of Iceland) Björn Þórðarson; (Kingdom of Iceland) Einar Arnalds

Strength
22,000 British Army; 2,659 Canadian Army; 3,908 U.S. Marines; 25 U.S. Navy ships; 40,000 U.S. Army	

The Occupation of Iceland during World War II began with a British invasion in order to occupy the island and deny it to Germany. The military operation, codenamed Operation Fork, was conducted by the Royal Navy and Royal Marines. The British forces were later replaced by Canadian and then American forces, even though the United States was not yet in the war.

== Invasion ==
The invasion of Iceland was a British military operation conducted by the Royal Navy and Royal Marines during World War II to occupy Iceland and deny it to Germany. At the start of the war, Britain imposed strict export controls on Icelandic goods, preventing profitable shipments to Germany, as part of its naval blockade. Britain offered assistance to Iceland, seeking cooperation "as a belligerent and an ally", but Reykjavík declined and reaffirmed its neutrality. The German diplomatic presence in Iceland, along with the island's strategic importance, alarmed the British. On 9 April 1940, Germany overran Denmark, Iceland's former mother country, whose king was still the Icelandic head of state. After failing to persuade the Icelandic government to join the Allies, the British invaded on the morning of 10 May. The initial force of 746 British Royal Marines, commanded by Colonel Robert Sturges, disembarked at the capital Reykjavík. Meeting no resistance, the troops moved quickly to disable communication networks, secure strategic locations, and arrest German citizens. Requisitioning local transport, the troops moved to Hvalfjörður, Kaldaðarnes, Sandskeið, and Akranes to secure landing areas against the possibility of a German counterattack.

On the evening of 10 May, the government of Iceland issued a protest, charging that its neutrality had been "flagrantly violated" and "its independence infringed", and noting that compensation would be expected for all damage done. The British promised compensation, favourable business agreements, non-interference in Icelandic affairs, and the withdrawal of all forces at the end of the war. Resigning themselves to the situation, the Icelandic authorities provided the invasion force with de facto cooperation, though formally maintaining a policy of neutrality. In the following days air defence equipment was deployed in Reykjavík and a detachment of troops sent to Akureyri. The initial invasion force was ill-equipped, only partially trained and insufficient for the occupation and defence of the island. On 17 May, 4,000 additional troops of the British Army arrived to relieve the marines. In July, elements of the 2nd Canadian Division and 3rd Canadian Division were landed. Commonwealth occupation forces eventually totalled 25,000 infantry with support elements from the Royal Air Force, Royal Navy and Royal Canadian Navy. One year after the invasion, military forces from the still officially neutral United States were stationed on the island by agreement with the Icelandic government, relieving the bulk of British ground forces. U.S. forces grew considerably after the U.S. entered the war on 11 December 1941, reaching up to 30,000 Army (including Air Force personnel) and Navy personnel at any one time. The RAF and RCAF continued to operate from two Royal Air Force stations through to the end of the war.

== Occupation ==
=== British occupation ===
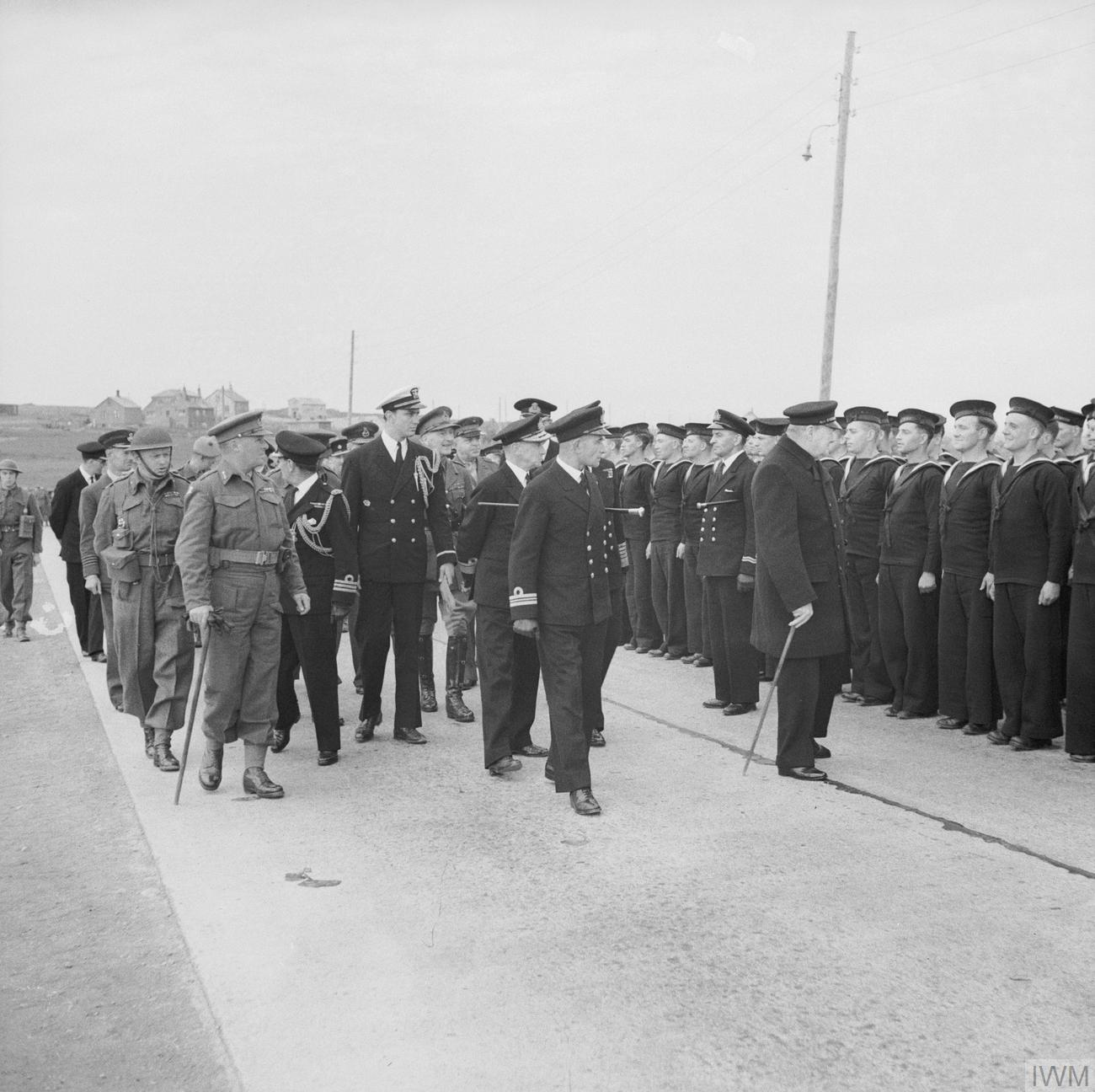
British Prime Minister Winston Churchill inspects a Royal Navy detachment at Reykjavik, August 1941

Under Brigadier George Lammie, Alabaster Force was formed to permanently occupy Iceland and fortify the island's defence. On 17 May 1940, the British 146th Infantry Brigade, arrived to relieve the Royal Marine invasion force, who left 19 May. Stretched thin, Brigadier Lammie requested additional forces of the HQ of the 49th (West Riding) Infantry Division, a Territorial Army (TA) formation under Major General Henry Curtis, and the 147th Brigade arrived on 26 May, followed by numerous convoys of troops and supplies. The Prime Minister, Winston Churchill, on his way home from visiting President Roosevelt, visited British occupation troops in 1940, and suggested the creation of a mountain and snow warfare school. Elements based in Akureyri formed the Tactical School, Winter Warfare Course which trained the 49th into a Mountain/Arctic division. The 49th Division adopted a new divisional insignia, featuring a polar bear standing on an ice floe. Additional reinforcements over the course of the summer included field artillery, anti-aircraft guns, Bren Gun Carriers, engineer and construction units, and support forces. The final British ground reinforcements, an infantry battalion and artillery battery, arrived in June 1941. By July 1941, there were over 25,000 British troops on the island.

Construction of airfields (including what became Reykjavík Airport), harbours, roads and other facilities began immediately. Hvalfjörður became a naval base for merchant escort and anti-submarine forces, with extensive facilities including a mine depot, pier and jetties, accommodation, a fresh water system, ammunition storage, a fleet bakery, bulk naval storage warehouse, recreation facilities, a direction-finding station and a fuel farm. The facility was protected by a minefield, anti-submarine gate and boom across the fjord, coastal guns, AA batteries, and anti-submarine trawlers. The Royal Navy Fleet Air Arm 701 Naval Air Squadron provided initial air support, and the army built two airfields, RAF Kaldadarnes and RAF Reykjavik, home to several RAF and RCAF squadrons until the end of the war. As naval base facilities grew, RAF Coastal Command aircraft were stationed for patrol, reconnaissance, and anti-submarine duties. The cruiser HMS Devonshire and the battleship King George V visited Akureyri harbour in May 1941, just before their sea battle with the German warships Bismarck and Prinz Eugen in the Denmark Strait between Greenland and Iceland. The hospital ship Leinster, based at Akureyri harbour, sailed on 24 May to care for the wounded after the destruction of HMS Hood in the battle. Two hospitals were also built: No. 50 General Hospital was built at Reykjavík and operated from June 1940 to March 1942; No. 30 General Hospital operated from July 1940 to September 1941.

At the end of hostilities most British facilities were turned over to the Icelandic government. 199 Commonwealth soldiers are buried in Iceland in six cemeteries cared for by the Commonwealth War Graves Commission.

British Army

- 49th (West Riding) Infantry Division
  - 70th Infantry Brigade
    - 10th Battalion, Durham Light Infantry
    - 11th Battalion, Durham Light Infantry
    - 1st Battalion, Tyneside Scottish
  - 147th Infantry Brigade
    - 1/6th Battalion, Duke of Wellington's Regiment
    - 1/7th Battalion, Duke of Wellington's Regiment
    - 1/5th Battalion, West Yorkshire Regiment
  - 146th Infantry Brigade
    - 4th Battalion, Lincolnshire Regiment
    - 1/4th Battalion, King's Own Yorkshire Light Infantry
    - Hallamshire Battalion, York and Lancaster Regiment
  - Divisional Troops
    - 2nd Battalion, Princess Louise's Kensington Regiment
    - 69th (West Riding) Field Regiment, Royal Artillery
    - 143rd (Kent Yeomanry) Field Regiment, Royal Artillery
    - 294th Field Company, Royal Engineers
    - 756th Field Company, Royal Engineers
    - 757th Field Company, Royal Engineers
    - 289th Field Park Company, Royal Engineers
    - 23rd Bridging Platoon, Royal Engineers
    - 49th (West Riding) Divisional Signals Regiment, Royal Corps of Signals

Royal Navy

- HMS Punjabi
- HMS Firedrake
- HMS Foxhound
- HMS Devonshire
- HMS King George V
- HMS Cheshire
- HMS Lancaster
- HMS Echo
- HMT Andes
- HMT Kingston Onyx
- HMT Kingston Turquoise
- HMT Franconia
- HMT Lancastria
- HMT Ormonde
- HMT Ulster Prince
- HMHS Leinster

Royal Air Force

- No. 48 Squadron
- No. 53 Squadron
- No. 86 Squadron
- No. 98 Squadron
- No. 120 Squadron
- No. 204 Squadron
- No. 209 Squadron
- No. 210 Squadron
- No. 221 Squadron
- No. 269 Squadron
- No. 279 Squadron
- No. 280 Squadron
- No. 330 Squadron
- No. 612 (County of Aberdeen) Squadron
- No. 1407 (Meteorological) Flight

=== Canadian occupation ===
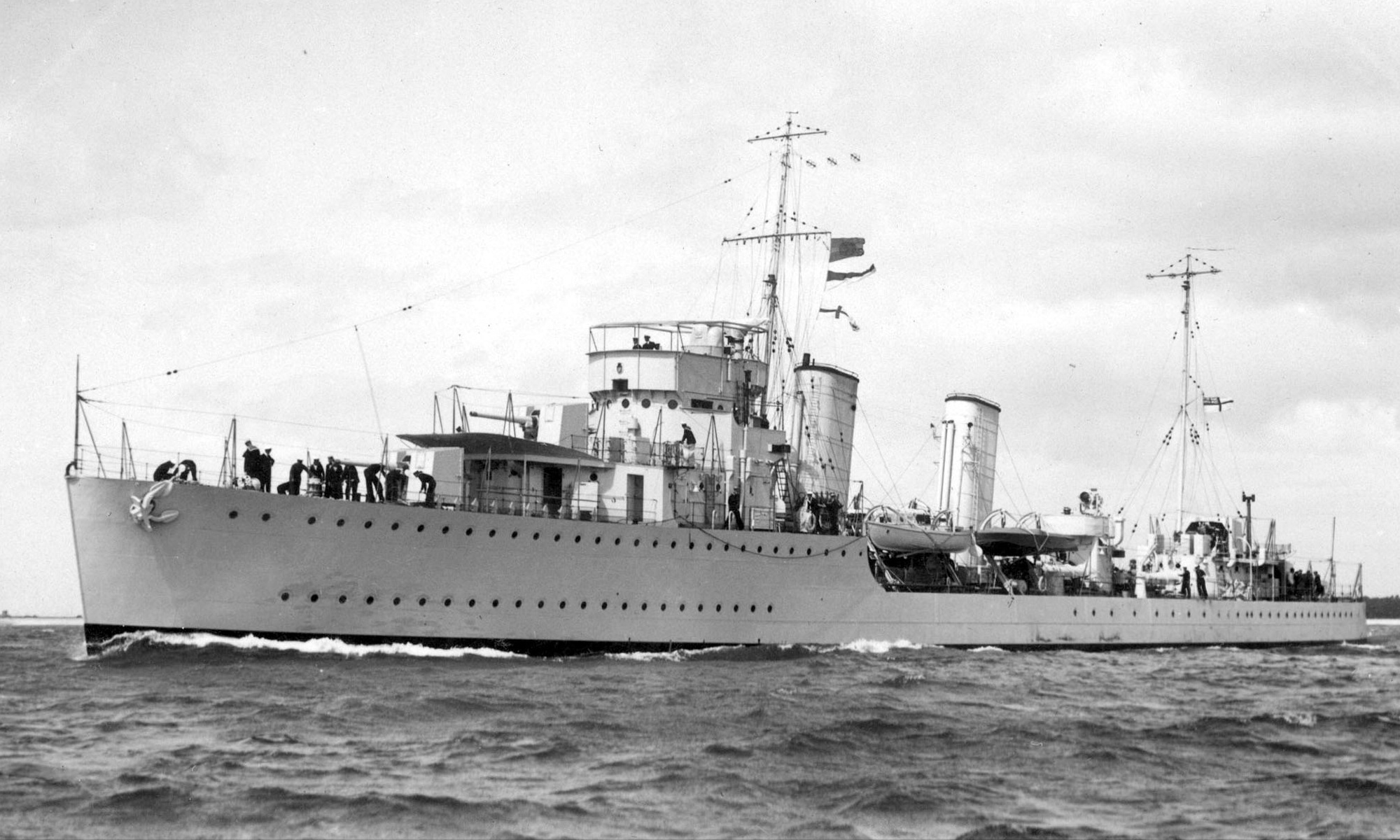
HMCS Skeena c.1941–43

I need hardly point out the strategic importance, not only of the security of the North Atlantic sea lanes, but to the defence of this continent, of maintaining control of Iceland.

— Prime Minister of Canada, Mackenzie King, 18 June 1940

On 18 May 1940, Britain requested Canada to garrison and defend Iceland with the 2nd Canadian Division, along with air force, anti-air, shore battery and coastal defence elements. "Z" Force, led by Brigadier L. F. Page, with part of his brigade headquarters and the Royal Regiment of Canada embarked on the RMS Empress of Australia on 10 June, and landed at Reykjavik on 16 June 1940. The remainder of the 2,659 man "Z" Force, comprising the Fusiliers Mont-Royal, the Cameron Highlanders of Ottawa (M.G.), a brigade signal section and details, arrived on 9 July. Canadian forces dispersed across the island and initiated work on defence positions, and preparations for the building of the aerodrome in Kaldaðarnes, building roads, improving harbours, establishing guard over strategic assets, and setting up coast watch stations. On 9 February 1941, Canadian forces engaged a single German aircraft overflying the island.

Owing to pressing needs elsewhere including Canadian commitments to the defence of Britain, and to providing garrison troops in the West Indies, it was agreed to redeploy Canadian forces. Force headquarters and the Royal Regiment sailed for England on 31 October and rejoined the main body of the 2nd Canadian Division. The Camerons, who had been allotted to the 3rd Division, spent the winter on the island and departed for England on 28 April 1941. They were temporarily replaced by British garrison forces, until 7 July 1941, when the defence of Iceland was transferred from Britain to the (still officially neutral) United States, by agreement with Iceland. Canadian army, navy and air force units were dispatched to and continued to operate in and around Iceland throughout the war. No. 162 Squadron RCAF was seconded to RAF Coastal Command and stationed at RAF Reykjavik from January 1944 to cover the mid-ocean portion of the North Atlantic shipping route. Aircraft from this squadron attacked two U-boats in 1944, sinking U-342 on 17 April 1944.

Canadian Army
- 4th Canadian Infantry Brigade
  - The Royal Regiment of Canada (rifle battalion)
  - Les Fusiliers Mont-Royal (rifle battalion)
  - The Cameron Highlanders of Ottawa (MG) (machine gun battalion)
Royal Canadian Navy
- HMS Royal Scotsman
- HMS Royal Ulsterman
- HMCS Skeena

Merchant Navy
- RMS Empress of Australia
- RMS Antonia
- SS Tregarthen
- SS Stonepool
- SS Dracola
- SS Yearwood
Royal Canadian Air Force
- No. 162 Squadron RCAF
- RCAF Marine Craft Beaver
- RCAF Marine Craft Eskimo

=== United States occupation ===
Footage of Iceland in November 1941 to early spring 1942, during US occupation

Reel 2

Britain needed its troops elsewhere, and requested that US forces occupy the island. The US agreed on 16 June 1941. The 1st Provisional Marine Brigade of 194 officers and 3,714 men from San Diego under the command of Brigadier General John Marston sailed from Charleston, South Carolina on 22 June to assemble as Task Force 19 (TF 19) at Argentia, Newfoundland: TF 19 sailed on 1 July. Britain failed to persuade the Althing to approve an American occupation force, but with TF 19 anchored off Reykjavík that evening Roosevelt gave approval for the invasion. The United States Marine Corps commenced landing on 8 July, and disembarkation was completed on 12 July. On 6 August, the United States Navy established an air base at Reykjavík with the arrival of Patrol Squadron VP-73 PBY Catalinas and VP-74 PBM Mariners. United States Army personnel began arriving in Iceland in August.

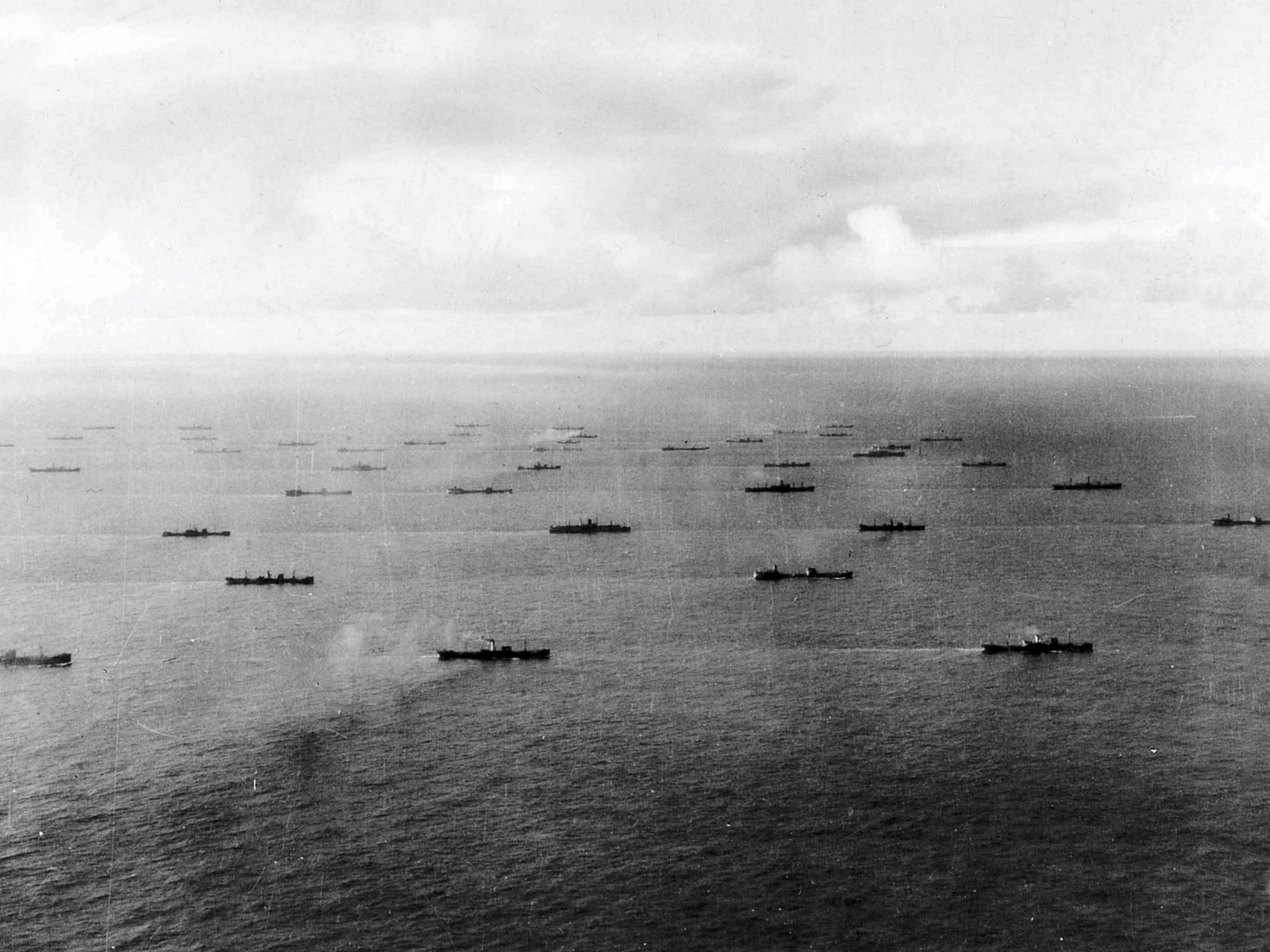
Allied convoy near Iceland, 1942

US Marines

- 1st Provisional Marine Brigade
  - 5th Marine Defense Battalion
  - 6th Marine Regiment (United States)
    - 1st Battalion 6th Marines
    - 2nd Battalion 6th Marines
    - 3rd Battalion 6th Marines
  - 2nd Battalion 10th Marines
  - A Company of the 2nd Tank Battalion
  - A Company of the 2nd Service Battalion

US Army Air Force

- 33rd Pursuit Squadron
- 24th Special Operations Wing

US Army

- 5th Infantry Division
  - Division Headquarters
    - 2nd Infantry Regiment
    - 10th Infantry Regiment
    - 11th Infantry Regiment
  - 5th Division Artillery
    - 19th Field Artillery Battalion, (18x 105mm Howitzers)
    - 46th Field Artillery Battalion, (18x 105mm Howitzers)
    - 50th Field Artillery Battalion, (18x 105mm Howitzers)
    - 21st Field Artillery Battalion, (18x 155mm Howitzers)
  - 7th Combat Engineer Battalion
  - 5th Reconnaissance Troop (Mechanized)
  - 5th Medical Battalion
  - Special Troops
    - 705th Ordnance Light Maintenance Company
    - 5th Quartermaster Company
    - 5th Signal Company
    - Military Police Platoon
    - Band
- 61st Coast Artillery

US Navy

- USS Arcturus
- USS Arkansas
- USS Benson
- USS Bernadou
- USS Brooklyn
- USS Buck
- USS Charles F. Hughes
- USS Cherokee
- USS Ellis
- USS Fuller
- USS Gleaves
- USS Hamul
- USS Heywood
- USS Hilary P. Jones
- USS Lansdale
- USS Lea
- USS Mayo
- USS Nashville
- USS New York
- USS Niblack
- USS Orizaba
- USS Plunkett
- USS Salamonie
- USS Upshur
- USS William P. Biddle
- VP-73 (United States Navy)

== Outcome ==
Britain invaded to forestall a German occupation, to provide a base for naval and air patrols, and to protect merchant shipping lanes from North America to Europe. In this the invasion and occupation was successful. The presence of British, Canadian, and US troops had a lasting impact on the country. Foreign troop numbers over the period of occupation were as follows:

- 1940: 20,000
- 1941: 25,000
- 1942: 30,000
- 1943: 30,000
- 1944: 15,000
- 1945: 7,000

In some years this equaled 25% of the population or almost 50% of the native male population.

Icelanders were and remain sharply divided about the war and occupation which is sometimes referred to as blessað stríðið or "the Lovely War". Some point to the subsequent economic revival, others to loss of sovereignty and social upheaval. The occupation required the building of a network of roads, hospitals, harbours, airfields and bridges across the country, and this did have enormous positive economic impact. On the other hand, Icelanders severely censured the sexual relationships between troops and local women, which were causing considerable controversy and political turmoil. Women were often accused of prostitution and of being traitors. Two hundred and fifty-five children were born from these liaisons, the ástandsbörn ("children of the situation"). In 1941, the Icelandic Minister of the Judiciary investigated "the Situation" (Ástandið), and the police tracked more than 500 women who had been having sex with the soldiers. Many were upset that the foreign troops were "taking away" women, friends, and family. In 1942 two facilities opened to house such women who slept with the soldiers. Both closed within a year, after investigations determined that most liaisons were consensual. About 332 Icelandic women married foreign soldiers.

During the occupation, on 17 June 1944, Iceland declared itself a republic after a constitutional referendum, and while continuing to cooperate with the British, Canadian, and American military they remained officially neutral throughout the war. As the war drew to a close the Keflavík Agreement signed in 1946 between the United States and the Republic of Iceland stipulated that the American army would leave the country within six months, and Iceland would take possession of Naval Air Station Keflavik (now Keflavík International Airport).

Although Germany did not invade, there was German interest in seizing Iceland. After the war, German three-star general Walter Warlimont, deputy chief of Wermacht Operations Staff, stated, "Hitler definitely was interested in occupying Iceland prior to [British] occupation. In the first place, he wanted to prevent 'anyone else' from coming there; and, in the second place, he also wanted to use Iceland as an air base for the protection of our submarines operating in that area". After the British invasion, the Germans drew up a report to examine the feasibility of seizing Iceland, Operation Ikarus. The report found that while an invasion could be successful, maintaining supply lines would be too costly and the benefits of holding Iceland would not outweigh the costs - for instance, there was insufficient infrastructure for aircraft in Iceland.

== See also ==
- Ástandið
- Invasion of Iceland
- Iceland in World War II
- British occupation of the Faroe Islands
- Expansion operations and planning of the Axis Powers
- Battle of the Atlantic
- Greenland in World War II
