= Iceland in World War II =

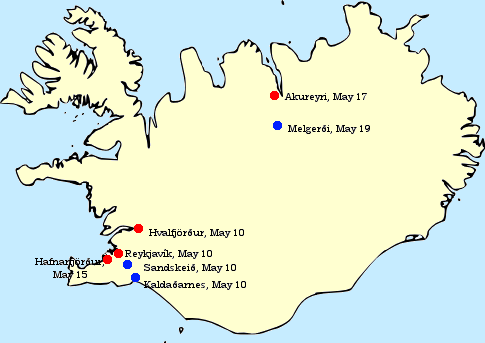
Initial British targets for the 1940 Invasion of Iceland: Reykjavík along with its harbour and seaplane landing site (Vatnagarðar), nearby landing grounds at Sandskeið and Kaldaðarnes to the east, the nearby anchorage at Hvalfjörður to the north, the harbour at Akureyri in the far north, and the nearby landing grounds at Melgerði. The harbour at Hafnarfjörður, near Reykjavík, was also secured early on.

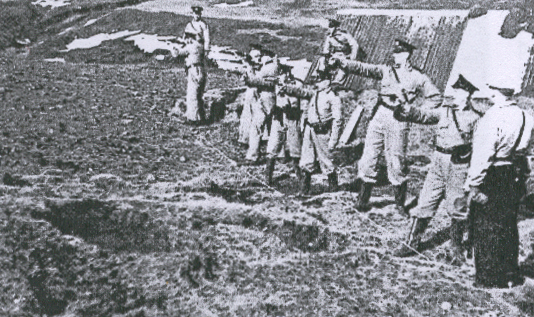
Training of Icelandic soldiers in 1940

At the beginning of World War II, Iceland was a sovereign kingdom in personal union with Denmark, with King Christian X as head of state. Iceland officially remained neutral throughout World War II. However, the British invaded Iceland on 10 May 1940. On 7 July 1941, the defence of Iceland was transferred from Britain to the United States, which was still a neutral country until five months later. On 17 June 1944, Iceland dissolved its union with Denmark and the Danish monarchy and declared itself a republic, which it remains to this day.

== Background ==
The British government was alarmed by Germany's growing interest in Iceland over the course of the 1930s. When war began, Denmark and Iceland declared neutrality and limited visits to the island by military vessels and aircraft of the belligerents.

=== Neutrality ===
During the German occupation of Denmark, contact between the countries was disrupted. Initially, the Kingdom of Iceland declared itself to be neutral, and limited visits of belligerent warships and imposed a ban on belligerent aircraft within Icelandic territory.

Following the invasion of Denmark on 9 April 1940, Iceland opened a legation in New York City. Iceland, however, unlike Norway, did not closely enforce limitations within its territorial waters and even slashed funding for the Icelandic Coast Guard. Many Axis merchant vessels seeking shelter within the neutral waters around Iceland were sunk by Allied warships. The Chief of the Capital Police Forces, Agnar Eldberg Kofoed-Hansen, started to train the National Defence forces in early 1940.

== Invasion ==
Footage of Iceland in November 1941 to early spring 1942

The British imposed strict export controls on Icelandic goods, preventing profitable shipments to Germany, as part of its naval blockade. London offered assistance to Iceland, seeking cooperation "as a belligerent and an ally", but Reykjavík declined and reaffirmed its neutrality. The German diplomatic presence in Iceland, along with the island's strategic importance, alarmed the British. After a few failed attempts at persuading the Icelandic government by diplomatic means to join the Allies and becoming a co-belligerent in the war against the Axis forces, the British invaded Iceland on 10 May 1940, one month after the German invasion of Denmark. The initial force of 746 British Royal Marines commanded by Colonel Robert Sturges was replaced on 17 May by two regular army brigades. In June the first elements of "Z" Force arrived from Canada to relieve the British, who returned to the defence of the UK. Three Canadian battalions — the Royal Regiment of Canada, the Cameron Highlanders and the Fusiliers Mont-Royal — were garrisoned on the island until drawn down for the defence of the UK in the spring of 1941, and replaced by British garrison forces.

On 7 July 1941, President Roosevelt announced to the Congress of the United States that the United States had landed forces in Iceland as a means of preventing German forces from taking control of the country's vital shipping and air ways. Iceland's strategic position along the North Atlantic sea-lanes, perfect for air and naval bases, could bring new importance to the island. The 1st Marine Brigade, consisting of approximately 4,100 troops, was garrisoned on Iceland until early 1942, when they were replaced by U.S. Army troops, so that they could join their fellow Marines fighting in the Pacific.

Iceland cooperated with the British and then the Americans, but officially remained neutral throughout World War II. Some historians have developed "shelter theory" which states that Iceland and other small countries, in addition to ordinary alliances, form relationships or "seek shelter" with larger countries and international institutions to make up for vulnerabilities inherent with small geographic area—vulnerabilities such as susceptibility to invasion.

== Life in occupied Iceland ==
British troops arrived and many stayed in the city of Reykjavík, causing much social disruption among the citizens. Women and young girls were thought to have had sexual relationships with the British soldiers. Reports also showed an increase in prostitution. This interaction also caused some hostility between the soldiers and Icelandic men. The large-scale interaction between young Icelandic women and soldiers came to be known as Ástandið ("the condition" or "situation") in Icelandic. Many Icelandic women married Allied soldiers and subsequently gave birth to children, many of whom bore the patronymic Hansson (hans translates as "his" in Icelandic), which was used because the father was unknown or had left the country. Some children born as a result of the Ástandið have English surnames.

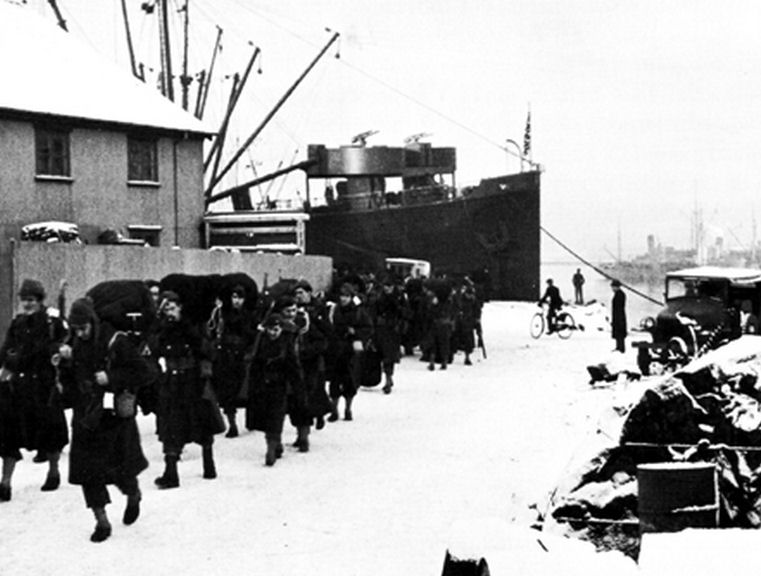
Arrival of US troops in Iceland in January 1942

During the war, drifting mines became a serious problem for Icelanders, as well as the Allied forces. The first Icelandic Explosive Ordnance Disposal (EOD) personnel were trained in 1942 by the British Royal Navy to help deal with the problem. The British forces also supplied the Icelandic Coast Guard with weapons and ammunition, such as depth charges against Axis U-boats. During the war, drifting mines and German U-boats damaged and sank a number of Icelandic vessels. Iceland's reliance on the sea, to provide nourishment and for trade, resulted in significant loss of life. In 1944, British Naval Intelligence built a group of five Marconi wireless direction-finding stations on the coast west of Reykjavík. The stations were part of a ring of similar groups located around the North Atlantic to locate wireless transmissions from U-boats.

On 10 February 1944, German Focke-Wulf Fw 200 Condor from the I./KG 40, stationed in Norway, sank the British tanker SS El Grillo at Seyðisfjörður.

On 17 June 1944, Iceland dissolved its union with Denmark and the Danish monarchy and declared itself a republic.

== Casualties ==
Approximately 230 Icelanders died in World War II hostilities. Most were killed on cargo and fishing vessels sunk by German aircraft, U-boats, and mines.

At least four Icelandic civilians were killed by U.S. forces during World War II, including two children aged 12 and 13. Three of them were shot dead by soldiers while one was attacked by a soldier with a knife.

== Aftermath and legacy ==
The presence of British and American troops in Iceland had a lasting impact on the country. Engineering projects, initiated by the occupying forces – especially the building of Reykjavík Airport – brought employment to many Icelanders. This was the so-called Bretavinna or “Brit labour”. Also, the Icelanders had a source of revenue by exporting fish to the United Kingdom.

A number of British Pathe newsreels of the period featured news from Iceland, including visits by Lord Gort in 1940 and Winston Churchill in 1941 following the Atlantic Charter.

Atlantic Convoy was a 1942 American film about naval patrols set during the Battle of the Atlantic.

The only other film made in this time period, and about the war, was a musical called Iceland. Iceland was not filmed in nor particularly about Iceland. Many years later, a two-part documentary was released called the Occupation Years 1940-1945. This documentary examines how World War II affected Iceland and its population, using stock footage and interviews to assess the impact. The filmmakers had concern that World War II would not be a part of the memory of the country, and the conflict and its impacts on Iceland would soon be forgotten. The goal of the film then was to preserve the history of the war and the invasion and occupation of the British and Americans.

== See also ==
- Iceland in World War II
  - Operation Ikarus
  - Invasion of Iceland
  - Occupation of Iceland
  - Ástandið
  - 1944 Icelandic constitutional referendum
- Greenland in World War II
- British occupation of the Faroe Islands
- Expansion operations and planning of the Axis Powers
- Battle of the Atlantic
