= Air transport in Iceland =

Air transport in Iceland is the transportation of cargo and passengers within Iceland, and internationally between Iceland and the rest of the world.

== History ==
=== Early years of domestic flight ===
The sparse nature of the Icelandic terrain, geographic isolation, harsh weather conditions, and the relative lack of other infrastructure such as rail transport, make air transportation important within Iceland. The first domestically operated aircraft in Iceland was operated by the Flugfélag Íslands (Aeronautical Society of Iceland) company, established on 22 March 1919. The company operated a single British-built Avro 504K biplane aircraft that the airline purchased from Denmark and flew from a field that was later the site of Reykjavík Airport. The Avro 504K was piloted initially by a Danish pilot though by summer 1920 a Canadian-Icelandic pilot by the name of Frank Fredrickson (also an Olympic medallist) was flying it. The company organised air-shows and carried passengers on sight-seeing tours, but ceased operation in 1920.

The first domestically operated airline operating scheduled flights within Iceland, also called Flugfélag Íslands, was founded in 1928. It flew regular flights from Reykjavík to different cities along the Icelandic coast, carrying 500 passengers and travelling 26,000 km in its first summer of operation, using a four-seater Junkers F 13 hired from Luft-Hansa. The following spring, using two four-seater aircraft, also hired from overseas, the airline flew 56,000 km with 1,110 passengers aboard. Passenger numbers decline in following years, and the airline was only able to sustain itself by flying as spotters for the Icelandic herring fishing fleet. The Icelandic Althing (parliament) passed legislation requiring fishermen to pay a tax on their takings in order to fund these flights, however after a series of poor seasons the tax was withdrawn in 1932 leading to the collapse of the airline.

In 1932-3 the Icelandic government sponsored two expeditions to Iceland as part of the International Polar Year. Two Fokker aeroplanes made 330 flights on 261 days to observe flying conditions over Iceland gathering useful information for the further development of air-transport on the island. Gliding also became popular during this time, with the Gliding Association of Iceland (Svifflugfélag Íslands) being founded on 10 August 1936, and the Gliding Association of Akureyri (Svifflugfélag Akureyrar) being founded on 9 April 1937 and operating Grunau IX-type gliders. The Aeronautical Association of Iceland (Flugmálafélag Íslands) also began operation around this time, being founded on 25 August 1936.

A further attempt at providing a domestic air service began in 1937 when a new company was founded, Flugfélag Akureyrar (Aeronautical Society of Akureyri), which in 1938 began flights along the route Reykjavík-Siglufjörður-Akureyri. The airline operated a five-seater Waco YKS-7 and, unlike previous companies, continued its service during the winter time. In March 1940 the company decided to rename itself as Flugfélag Íslands and moved its headquarters from Akureyri to Reykjavík. This company eventually developed into the Icelandic flag-carrier line Icelandair.

The development of infrastructure to handle aviation fuel also began around this time, with Iceland importing about 36 metric tonnes of aviation spirit on average for each of the years 1938-1940, and by 1942, storage tanks for around 1,000 metric tonnes being established by the Shell company at Skerjafjörður.

=== Early international flights ===
The 1920s and early 1930s also saw the beginning of international flights to Iceland. Given Iceland's position part way across the Atlantic between Europe and North America, initially these focused on using Iceland as a stopping-place on trans-Atlantic journeys. The US Army Air Service's 1924 attempt at flying around the world using flying boats landed at Hornafjörður after leaving the United Kingdom, and continued on to Reykjavík before continuing on to Greenland. The British Arctic Air Route Expedition of 1930-31 also used the island as a stopping-place on its journey to Greenland. Air travellers staging at Iceland included Wolfgang von Gronau in 1930, 1931 and 1932, Charles Lindbergh in an expedition for Pan-American Airways in 1933, and John Grierson and Italo Balbo's fleet of seaboats in 1934.

Foreign companies were interested in establishing operations in Iceland. The German Luft-Hansa company, the national carrier of Nazi Germany, for a time gave assistance to support domestic air travel within Iceland and secured an agreement with the Icelandic government in 1931 that they would enjoy the same rights to fly to and from Iceland that would be granted to any other company. Pan-American secured an agreement to establish air transport links within Iceland and to and from it in 1936, however since they made no progress in developing them in the subsequent two years the agreement was cancelled. The Luft-Hansa agreement was due to lapse in January 1940, and Luft-Hansa sent a commission to Iceland to negotiate with the Icelandic authorities about potential further developments of it, but they discovered that the Pan-American agreement had been cancelled meaning their own rights were also cancelled. The Icelandic authorities stated that they did not plan to give any further flying rights to foreign companies for the time being.

=== The Second World War ===
In May 1940, after the German attack on Denmark (which then controlled Iceland's foreign affairs and was responsible for its defence), Iceland was occupied by the British in order to forestall a feared German invasion. Subsequent to this, Iceland was used as a stopping-point for flights across the Atlantic from North America to the United Kingdom. Whilst the Germans cancelled their planned invasion in June 1940 due, in part, to the perceived difficulty of establishing bases for aircraft to operate from on the island, the British moved to develop air bases there.

Construction began of RAF Reykjavik at the site of Reykjavík airport in 1940, with a paved runway being constructed as the existing grass airfield was considered too boggy for the operation of heavy aircraft. These paved runways were still in use in 2016. An RAF airbase was also constructed at Kaldadarnes though this had to be abandoned in 1943 due to flooding. In July 1941 the United States took over the occupation of Iceland. An airbase was subsequently constructed by the Americans at Keflavík which subsequently became an international airport.

During the allied occupation of Iceland, domestic air transportation continued to develop. Flugfélag Íslands purchased an additional Waco YTS, and, in 1942, obtained its first two-engine aircraft, a Beechcraft 18D. Two further two-engined de Havilland Rapides were obtained from the UK in 1944. Due to the lack of suitable airfields in the country, the decision was taken to supplement these aircraft with flying boats, with Flugfélag Íslands buying a Consolidated PBY Catalina flying boat in 1944. On 11 July 1945 the first international flight by an Icelandic airline was made between Iceland and the UK, with the Flugfélag Íslands Catalina making the journey from Reykjavík and Largs Bay in Scotland carrying four passengers.

A competitor company to Flugfélag Íslands called Loftleiðir hf (later known internationally as Icelandic Airlines) began in 1943 with the purchase of a four-seater Stinson Reliant, with the company being officially founded the following year, on 10 March. The company had been started by three pilots who had attempted to fly aircraft to Iceland to sell to Flugfélag Íslands in return to jobs, but who had been unable to conclude a deal with them. Loftleiðir purchased a further Stinson Reliant in 1944 as well as a Grumman Goose. aircraft operated by the airline in its early years also included Noorduyn Norseman and Avro Anson, aircraft. Loftleiðir also took on the job of spotting for the herring fleet. The Icelandic Civil Aviation Administration was also founded in 1945.

=== Post-war ===
With the end of world war, and both Reykjavík and Keflavík airports being made available for civilian traffic, both of the Icelandic airlines expanded their fleet and services. Loftleiðir obtained seven more aircraft during 1945-46, mostly from the US Air Force. Flugfélag Íslands obtained two further aircraft and made flights to Copenhagen. Aircraft obtained by Flugfélag Íslands after the war included DC-3 Dakotas that served domestic routes until 1973. Flugfélag Íslands opened services to and from Greenland as well as obtaining more modern aircraft, such as Fokker Friendship aircraft, to serve domestic routes.

In contrast to Flugfélag Íslands with its mix of short-range international and domestic services, Loftleiðir focused more on the international services, entered the US market during this period using two DC-4 Skymaster aircraft it had obtained. In 1952 Loftleiðir abandoned the Icelandic domestic market entirely to focus solely on international services, adopting the slogan "We are slower, but we are lower" to advertise their cut-price trans-Atlantic flights between the US and Luxembourg. Introducing high-capacity CL-44 cargo aircraft which were converted for passenger service, Loftleiðir for a time operated the highest-capacity civil aircraft operating on the trans-Atlantic route, seating 189 passengers. By the 1960's Loftleiðir 's low-cost services had made it popular with young travellers, giving it the reputation of being the "Hippie's Airline". However, these low prices also drew it into conflict with the IATA grouping of airlines for under-cutting them.

Jet aircraft were introduced to Iceland in 1966 with the purchase by Flugfélag Íslands of a Boeing 727. This operated originally from Reykjavík airport but, as the airport was too small to handle large jet aircraft, services were moved to Keflavík international.

=== Industry consolidation in the 1970's ===
During the early 1970's the global air transport industry saw declining revenues. Loftleiðir particularly lost money on Scandinavian and UK-bound services, and was impacted by price-cutting by competitors that saw Loftleiðir 's already-cheap offers under-cut. Flugfélag Íslands and Loftleiðir also entered into price competition on a number of routes. To forestall potential negative outcomes from this situation, the Icelandic government pressured the two companies to enter into merger negotiations, and in 1973 they merged to form Icelandair Group (Flugleiða hf.). Under the new group structure, Icelandic (formerly Loftleiðir) operated trans-Atlantic services whilst Icelandair (formerly Flugfélag Íslands) was responsible for European and domestic routes. Icelandair Group was initially just a holding company for the two operations, but in 1979 also assumed responsibility for managing them.
