= Royal Marines Division =

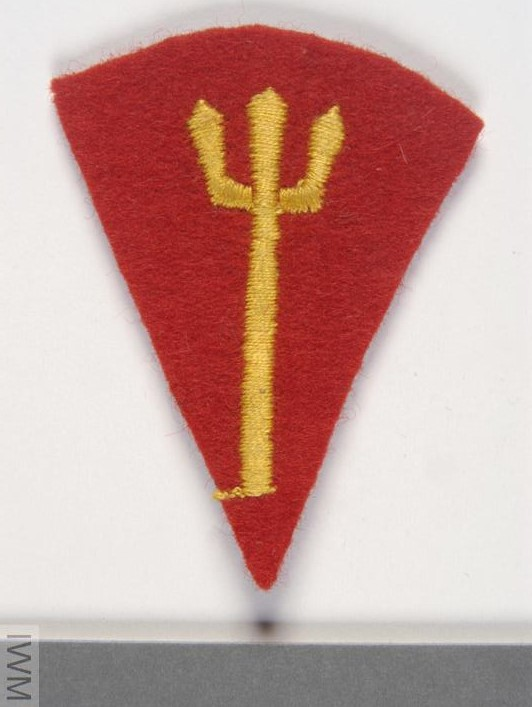
- The Royal Marines Division's shoulder badge
- Active: 1940–1943
- Country: United Kingdom
- Branch: Royal Marines
- Role: Amphibious warfare
- Engagements: Operation Menace

Commanders
- Notable commanders: Robert Sturges

The Royal Marine Brigade and subsequent Royal Marine Division were amphibious warfare formations created by the British Royal Marines at the start of the Second World War.

The composition of both formations was almost constantly in flux, with neither ever achieving their full establishment. Though neither saw action, they both played important roles in the development of amphibious warfare techniques and their constituent units went on to play important roles in the largest amphibious operation in history, Operation Neptune.

== Recruitment and Training ==
As regular entry for a minimum of 12 years service as a professional Marine was continued throughout the war, and the Admiralty decided that only regulars and regular reservists could serve at sea, Hostilities Only conscripts found themselves almost exclusively manning the new land based Royal Marine units, including the Royal Marine Brigade and Division. Notwithstanding that these men were conscripts, most had expressed a preference for service in the Royal Marines on selection, sometimes as a second choice to serving in more highly qualified roles in the Royal Navy.

A new training camp, the Royal Marine Special Reserve Depot, Exton, was commissioned for basic training of these Special Reservists but was not ready to receive recruits till 22 February 1940. Basic training included kitting up, lectures, physical training, drill, basic small arms handling and the administration of many injections. Infantry skills were taught on posting to battalions, until the dedicated Royal Marine Infantry Training Centre (ITC) was opened at the neighbouring Dalditch Camp from 1 May 1941. This training included an assault course, advanced weapon training, range work and night firing. The final stage of the 17 week training course involved field-craft including cooking and survival, the last week of this being under canvas near the village of Ottery St Mary. On 5 September 1941 the Exton Camp was renamed the Royal Marine Depot, Lympstone.

== The Royal Marine Brigade ==
The Admiralty appointed Madden Committee of 1924 proposed that a brigade of 3,000 Marines should be based ashore to "provide a striking force ... immediately available for use under the direction of the Naval Commander-in-Chief for amphibious operations, such as raids on the enemy coastline and bases ..." Peace-time finances had prevented the formation of such a force, but in September 1939 it was decided to raise a brigade of three light infantry battalions with around 2,000 men to fulfill this role. At that time the expectation was that the 1st Royal Marine Brigade would be deployed in the Mediterranean Theatre should Italy enter the war.

By January it had been decided to expand the brigade to four battalions, but the first recruits did not reach them from the Royal Marine Special Reserve Depot until April 1940. By May 1940 it had already been decided to reform the outfit as two brigades, named the 101st RM Brigade and 102nd RM Brigade to avoid confusion with the 1st & 2nd Army Brigades then on service with the BEF. The 2nd & 3rd RM Battalions were to form the 102nd Brigade, whilst the 1st RM Battalion was to be joined by the new 5th RM Battalion to form the 101st RM Brigade (the 4th RM Battalion having been permanently disbanded as a mark of honour for their sacrifice at Zeebruge in 1918).

Each brigade raised a medium machine gun company, a mobile (reconnaissance) company carrying anti-tank rifles in motorcycle side-car combinations, and a light howitzer battery of 6 mountain guns as support troops. All of this materiel was capable of being man-handled, thus avoiding the delay of hoisting heavier equipment into MLCs and thus losing the element of surprise. Nevertheless, discussions were held with the ISTDC to improve vehicle landing times.

=== Royal Marine Brigade Operations ===
Forces from the Royal Marine Brigade including 2nd RM Battalion formed the core of Force Sturges for the occupation of Iceland in May 1940. By June that force had been relieved and in the wake of the Dunkirk evacuation, and the RM Brigade was placed on standby in Pembrokeshire to counter any threat of German occupation of neutral Ireland. By July the concern shifted to a potential German occupation of the neutral Portuguese islands of the Azores and Cape Verdes, with the RM Brigade relocating around Plymouth as a departure port, and undertaking coastal defence duties while they waited. The brigade had not expected to complete training until the end of July, so all of these tasks were accomplished whilst under-strength.

== The Royal Marine Division ==
In August 1940 the decision was made to group the Royal Marine Brigades under a full Royal Marine Division. A key element of this plan was the raising of a third brigade, the 103rd RM Brigade consisting of the 7th & 8th RM Battalions (the 6th RM Battalion having been permanently disbanded as a mark of disgrace following the mutiny in Murmansk in 1919). However, the deteriorating situation in the Eastern Mediterranean resulted in the 103rd RM Brigade functioning as a holding unit for recruits for the RM Mobile Naval Base Defence Organisation in Alexandria, with both the 7th & 8th RM Battalions eventually being transferred to that theatre.

The battalion machine gun companies and brigade mobile companies were gathered together as the 15th RM Machine Gun and 18th RM Mobile (Reconnaissance) Battalions respectively in December 1940, but the divisional HQ was not formed until February 1941 under Major-General Robert Sturges. Under his direction the Division reformed back into two functional brigade groups, with the 101st & 102nd RM Brigades both forming their own brigade artillery regiments, each with the addition of an anti-tank and anti-aircraft battery to their existing light howitzer batteries. In May 1941 the 103rd RM Brigade was officially re-designated a training brigade with responsibility for the 15th & 18th support battalions, and the newly raised 9th & 10th RM Battalions.

In July 1942 the Division underwent its final re-organisation. The 103rd RM Brigade was disbanded and replaced by the 104th RM (Training) Brigade, with the 9th & 10th RM Battalions being re-assigned to the 101st & 102nd Brigades respectively to form a division of two brigades of three battalions each. At the same time Divisional Artillery HQ was raised, absorbing the former brigade artillery regiments to form a Field Regiment, Anti-Tank Regiment and Light Anti-Aircraft Regiment. The machine gun and reconnaissance support battalions were to have been supplemented by an engineer battalion, but this never exceeded Field Company strength.

=== Royal Marine Division Operations ===
In August 1940 the RM Division, though still only at the strength of 2 light brigades, undertook formal embarkation, on-ship, and debarkation exercises on transports before departing for Freetown, Sierra Leone for Operation Manacle:

- 101st RM Brigade
  - 1st RM Battalion from the Clyde on the SS Ettrick
  - 5th RM Battalion on the SS Karanja
- 102nd RM Brigade
  - 2nd RM Battalion on the SS Kenya
  - 3rd RM Battalion on the MS Sobieski (though A Company were on the Ettrick)

Though deployed off Dakar, the Free French coup failed and the RM Division troops returned to Freetown.

101st Brigade were withdrawn back to the Clyde in October 1940, but 102nd Brigade remained on standby in Freetown, not rejoining the 101st in West Scotland until February 1941. By this time the Commandos had become established under Combined Operations HQ as the British amphibious raiding force, and operational opportunities for the RM Division proved elusive. Despite extensive training in beach assault landings, proposals for use of the RM Division in the Lofoten Islands Raid in December 1941 were rebuffed in favour of the Commandos.

The temporary attachment of the 8th Argylls over the winter of 1940-1 enabled the RM Division to develop new techniques in landing heavy weapons and training regular army troops in amphibious operations, and this was extended under Major-General Sturges by the attachment of the 29th Independent Infantry Brigade in May 1941. This expanded Division was originally assembled to provide a force to invade the Canary Isles, should Spain enter the war on the side of the Axis powers, and was then held on standby by General Harold Alexander for a range of potential amphibious operations. The last of these was Operation Ironclad, with Major-General Sturges taking part of the RM Division HQ to head up Force 121 for the amphibious assault on Diego-Suarez in may 1942. However, despite supporting representations from Admiral Mountbatten who was then Chief of Combined Operations, the War Office considered the light infantry units of the Royal Marine Division to be unsuitable for the task. The Admiralty refused to approve the RM Division being brought up to a standard establishment, and so their place was taken by two brigades of 5th Division.

The two Brigade Groups of the RM Division were offered to General Eisenhower for Operation Torch in the autumn of 1942, but the offer was rejected with the role being taken instead by two brigades of the 78th Division that had been formed in May 1942 specifically for that purpose. It was in response to this rejection that the division started to develop its own divisional artillery capability in 1943. The division was attached to Naval Force J (the retained Combined Operations landing flotillas from Operation Jubilee) for training on the south coast of England over the first half of that year.

== Dissolution of the Royal Marine Division ==
Vice-Admiral Louis Mountbatten, Chief of Combined Operations, having "made friends with the division in Wales" lobbied hard for its deployment in its intended role, as an amphibious assault force. However, this had been repeatedly blocked by the Army on the basis that it lacked the heavy weapons and logistical support needed to maintain itself in the field after an initial assault. In General Eisenhower's terms, the RM Division "hadn't got a tail".

General Alan Bourne, the Adjutant General of the Royal Marines from October 1939 to January 1943, had personally resisted suggestions from the War Office that the RM Division should be made up to a standard divisional establishment. He was concerned that if equipped as any other division it would lose its intended purpose, be removed from the Admiralty and deployed by the Army, as had been his personal experience when serving as a Major with the Royal Naval Division in the Great War. But agreements secured from the War Office to provide those supporting elements on attachment were never realised in practice.

The impasse was broken by Mountbatten, who engineered the dissolution of the division and the redeployment of its constituent units to Combined Operations as one of his last acts as Chief of Combined Operations. The RM Division was disbanded in August 1943:

- RM Division HQ became Special Service Group HQ
  - 101st RM Brigade HQ became 4th Special Service Brigade HQ
    - 1st RM Battalion became No. 42 RM Commando
    - 5th RM Battalion became No. 45 RM Commando
    - 9th RM Battalion became No. 46 RM Commando
  - 102nd RM Brigade became 3rd Special Service Brigade HQ
    - 2nd RM Battalion became No. 43 RM Commando
    - 3rd RM Battalion became No. 44 RM Commando
    - 10th RM Battalion became No. 47 RM Commando
  - RM Divisional Artillery
    - RM Field Artillery Regiment became Royal Marine Armoured Support Group
    - RM Light Anti-Aircraft Regiment became Landing Craft Flack gun crews
  - RM Support Battalions
    - RM Engineer Field Company became six RM Landing Craft Obstacle Clearance Units and two Special Service Brigade Engineer Troops.

Other units, including the 30% of the personnel of the RM Battalions who didn't pass the Commando training course at Achnacarry, were deployed as crews for minor land craft flotillas (LCAs, LCMs & LCP(L)s).

== Organization ==
Evolution of Operational Units of RM Brigade / Division
	Summer 1940	Summer 1941	Summer 1943
Division HQ	-	Division HQ & Signals	Division HQ & Signals
Brigades	101st Brigade: 1st RM Battalion; 5th RM Battalion; Machine-Gun Cpy.; Mobile Company; 31st Howitzer Battery; 102nd Brigade: 2nd RM Battalion; 3rd RM Battalion; Machine-Gun Cpy.; Mobile Company; 32nd Howitzer Brigade	101st Brigade: 1st RM Battalion; 5th RM Battalion; 101st RM Artillery; 31st Howitzer Battery; 1st Anti-Tank Battery; 1st Light Anti-Aircraft Battery; 102nd Brigade: 2nd RM Battalion; 3rd RM Battalion; 102nd RM Artillery; 32nd Howitzer Battery; 2nd Anti-Tank Battery; 2nd Light Anti-Aircraft Battery	101st Brigade: 1st RM Battalion; 5th RM Battalion; 9th RM Battalion; 102nd Brigade: 2nd RM Battalion; 3rd RM Battalion; 10th RM Battalion
Support Troops		15th Machine-Gun Battalion; 18th (Mobile) Battalion	15th Machine-Gun Battalion; 18th (Mobile) Battalion; RM Engineer Field Company
Divisional Artillery			RM Division Artillery HQ: 1st RM Field Artillery Regiment; 31st RM Light Battery; 32nd RM Light Battery; 1st RM Field Battery; 2nd RM Field Battery; 1st RM Anti-Tank Regiment; 1st RM Anti-Tank Battery; 2nd RM Anti-Tank Battery; 1st RM Light Anti-Aircraft Regiment; 1st RM LAA Battery; 2nd RM LAA Battery; 1st RM AA/A-T Battery; 2nd RM AA/A-T Battery
Training Formations		103rd (Training) Brigade: 7th RM Battalion; 8th RM Battalion	104th (Training) Brigade

== See also ==
- List of British divisions in World War II
