= Invasion of Iceland =

1940 British operation during World War II

- Part of The Scandinavian theatre of World War II
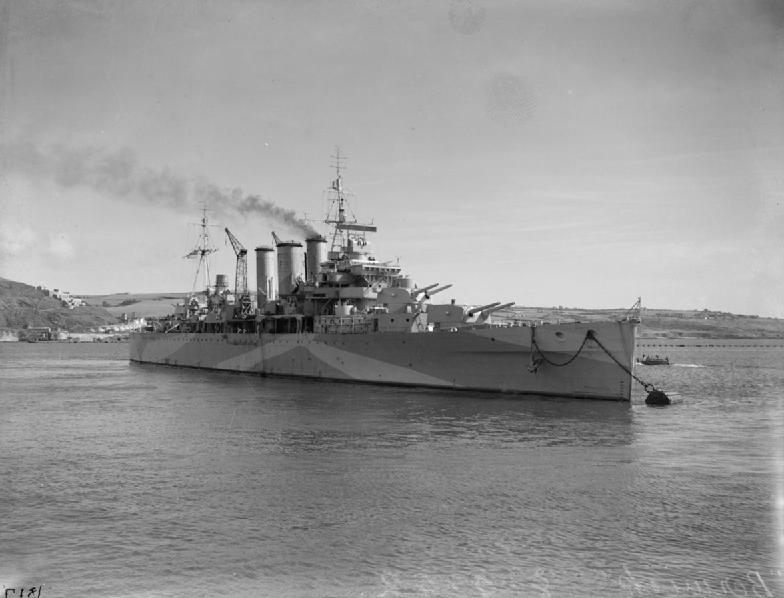
- The British heavy cruiser HMS Berwick
Date	10 May 1940
Location	Reykjavík, Iceland
Result	British victory
Territorial changes	British occupation of Iceland begins

Belligerents
United Kingdom	Kingdom of Denmark: Kingdom of Iceland

Commanders and leaders
(United Kingdom) Neville Chamberlain; (United Kingdom) Winston Churchill; (United Kingdom) Robert Sturges	(Danish Realm) Kristján X; (Kingdom of Iceland) Hermann Jónasson; (Kingdom of Iceland) Einar Arnalds

Units involved
(United Kingdom) 2nd Battalion	(Kingdom of Iceland) Iceland Police; (Kingdom of Iceland) Icelandic Coast Guard

Strength
746 Royal Marines; 4 warships	60 police; 300 reservists

Casualties and losses
1 suicide	None

On 10 May 1940, during World War II, the United Kingdom landed Royal Navy and Royal Marines forces at Reykjavík and occupied Iceland without resistance. The operation, codenamed Operation Fork, was launched after Germany's rapid conquest of Denmark, to which Iceland was linked by a personal union, and amid British fears that Germany might establish bases on the strategically important island. Iceland had declared neutrality at the start of the war and rejected British requests for cooperation, but the UK proceeded with an unannounced landing to pre-empt any German move.

British troops quickly secured Reykjavík, detained German nationals, and occupied key communication and transport sites before spreading out to potential landing grounds and harbours. Iceland issued a formal protest against the violation of its neutrality, while Britain promised compensation, non-interference, and eventual withdrawal. Over the following months the initial marine detachment was replaced by British, Canadian, and later American forces, whose presence—eventually numbering tens of thousands—had lasting military, economic, and social effects on the country.

Although Germany examined but never executed plans to seize Iceland, the Allied occupation helped secure North Atlantic shipping routes and enabled the establishment of major naval and air bases. Iceland became a republic in 1944, and foreign forces remained until the final withdrawal of US troops in 1947. A treaty signed in 1951 allowed US troops to maintain a presence, which lasted until 2006.

== Background ==
During 1918, after a long period of Danish rule, Iceland had become an independent state in personal union with the Danish king and with common foreign affairs. The new Kingdom of Iceland declared itself a neutral country without a defence force. The treaty of union allowed for a revision to begin during 1941 and for unilateral termination three years after that, if no agreement was made. By 1928, all Icelandic political parties were in agreement that the union treaty would be terminated as soon as possible.

Following the experience of the First World War, some German naval strategists, in particular Vice-Admiral Wolfgang Wegener, felt a defensive naval strategy was wrong and the best use of German naval strength would be to go on the offensive in naval warfare against the United Kingdom. Wegener and his disciples argued, Germany could have unrestricted access to the open seas only following conquest of Norway, Shetland, the Faroe Islands and Iceland, so to circumvent Britain's naval stranglehold, Scandinavian neutrality was an irrelevance. By 1925, Wegener had developed his ideas, which were published in a book, Die Seestrategie des Weltkrieges, in 1929. Wegener's ideas came to permeate German naval planning, even though it was not directed explicitly towards Britain until the spring of 1938. Apparently the British Admiralty was unaware of such German interest in Scandinavia until April 1939 when the "Chief Diplomatic Adviser to His Majesty's Government", Robert Vansittart drew the First Sea Lord, Admiral Backhouse's attention to Wegener's book.

On 9 April 1940, German forces began Operation Weserübung, invading both Norway and Denmark. Denmark was subdued within a day and occupied. That same afternoon, Prime Ministers, Neville Chamberlain and Paul Reynaud held an Anglo-French Supreme War Council meeting in London. The SWC agreed that "Suitable measures were to be taken to occupy the Faroe Islands, and assurances of protection would be given to Iceland." Accordingly, the Chamberlain government sent a message to Iceland's Jónasson government, stating that the UK was willing to assist Iceland in maintaining its independence but would require facilities in Iceland to do so. Iceland was invited to join the UK in the war "as a belligerent and an ally." The Icelandic government rejected the offer. On the next day, 10 April, the Icelandic parliament, the Alþingi (or Althing), declared Danish King Christian X unable to perform his constitutional duties and assigned them to the government of Iceland, along with all other responsibilities previously performed by Denmark on behalf of Iceland.

With Operation Valentine the British occupied the Faroe Islands, on 12 April 1940. After the German invasion of Denmark and Norway, the British government became increasingly concerned that Germany would soon try to establish a military presence in Iceland. They felt that this would constitute an intolerable threat to British control of the North Atlantic. Just as strategically important, the British were eager to obtain bases in Iceland to strengthen their Northern Patrol.

== Planning ==
As the military situation in Norway deteriorated, the Admiralty came to the conclusion that Britain could no longer do without bases in Iceland. Positionally Iceland commands the North Atlantic, so had to be occupied to prevent a German victory in the Battle of the Atlantic. On 6 May, the First Lord of the Admiralty, Winston Churchill presented the case to the War Cabinet. Churchill maintained that if further negotiations with the Icelandic government were attempted, the Germans might learn of them and act first. A surer and more effective solution was to land troops unannounced and present the Icelandic government with a fait accompli. The War Cabinet approved the plan but the expedition was mounted in a rush. Much of the planning was conducted en route; the force was supplied with few maps, most of poor quality, with one of them having been drawn from memory. No one in the expedition was fully fluent in Icelandic.

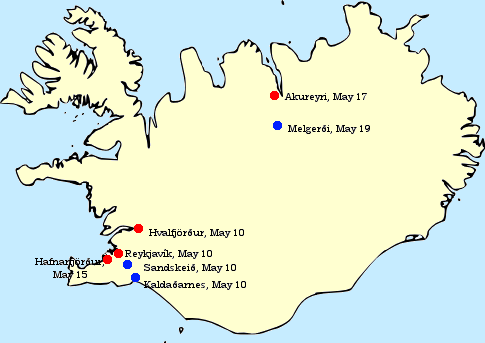
Map of initial British targets for the invasion of Iceland in May 1940.

The British planned to land all of their forces at Reykjavík. There, they would overcome any resistance and defeat local Germans. To guard against a German counter-attack by sea, they would secure the harbour and send troops by land to nearby Hvalfjörður. The British were also worried that the Germans might airlift troops, as they had done with great success in their Norwegian campaign. To guard against this, troops would drive east to the landing grounds at Sandskeið and Kaldaðarnes. Troops would also be sent by land to the harbour at Akureyri and the landing ground at Melgerði in the north of the country.

The UK Naval Intelligence Division (NID) expected resistance from three possible sources. Local Germans, who were thought to have some arms, might resist or even attempt some sort of coup. A German invasion force might already be prepared or begun immediately after the British landings. The NID also expected resistance from the Reykjavík police, consisting of some 60 armed men. If by chance a Danish patrol vessel were present in Reykjavík, the Danish sailors might assist the defenders. The only Danish naval vessels abroad were in Greenland.

== Operation Fork ==
=== Force Sturges ===
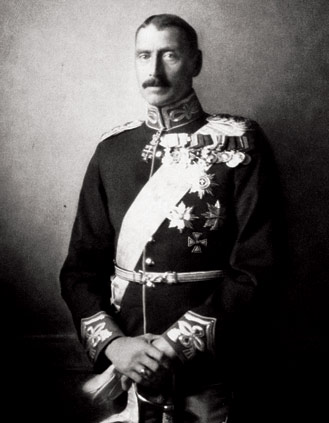
King Christian X was said by Time to be "less unpopular in Iceland than any other Danish sovereign has ever been".

On 3 May 1940, the 2nd Royal Marine Battalion in Bisley, Surrey received orders from London to be ready to move at two hours' notice for an unknown destination. The battalion had been activated only the month before. Though there was a nucleus of active service officers, the troops were new recruits and only partially trained. There was a shortage of weapons, which consisted only of rifles, pistols, and bayonets, while 50 of the marines had only just received their rifles and had not had a chance to fire them. On 4 May, the battalion received some modest additional equipment in the form of Bren light machine guns, anti-tank rifles, and 2-inch mortars (51 mm). With no time to spare, zeroing of the weapons and initial familiarisation shooting would have to be conducted at sea.

Assisting arms provided to the force consisted of two 3.7-inch mountain howitzers, four QF 2-pounder anti-aircraft guns, and two QF 4-inch coastal defence guns. The guns were manned by troops from the artillery divisions of the Navy and the marines, none of whom had ever fired them. They lacked searchlights, communication equipment, and gun directors.

Colonel Robert Sturges was assigned to command the force. Aged 49, he was a highly regarded veteran of World War I, having fought in the battle of Gallipoli and the battle of Jutland. He was accompanied by a small intelligence detachment commanded by Major Humphrey Quill and a diplomatic mission managed by Charles Howard Smith. Excluding those, the invasion force consisted of 746 troops.

=== Journey to Iceland ===
On 6 May, Force Sturges boarded trains for Greenock on the Firth of Clyde. To avoid drawing attention to itself, the force was divided into two trains for the journey, but due to delays in rail travel, the troops arrived at the railway station in Greenock about the same time, losing the small degree of anonymity desired. Additionally, security had been compromised by a dispatch uncoded and by the time the troops arrived in Greenock, many people knew that the destination was Iceland.

On the morning of 7 May, the force headed to the harbour in Greenock, where they met the cruisers Berwick and Glasgow, which would take them to Iceland. Boarding commenced but was fraught with problems and delays. Departure was delayed until 8 May, and even then a large amount of equipment and supplies had to be left on the piers.

At 04:00 on 8 May, the cruisers departed for Iceland. They were accompanied by an anti-submarine escort consisting of the destroyers Fearless and Fortune. The cruisers were not designed to transport a force of the size assigned to them, and conditions were cramped. Many of the marines developed severe seasickness. The voyage was used as planned for calibration and familiarisation with the newly acquired weapons. One of the newly recruited marines died by suicide en route. The voyage was uneventful otherwise.

In May 1940 we transported Royal Marines to Iceland and the island was occupied on the 10th May to prevent the occupation by a German force. A number of German civilians and technicians were made prisoners and transported back to the United Kingdom. Very rough seas were encountered on passage to Iceland and the majority of the marines cluttered gangways and mess-decks throughout the ship, prostrate with seasickness. One unfortunate marine committed suicide.

— Stan Foreman, petty officer of HMS Berwick

=== Surprise is lost ===
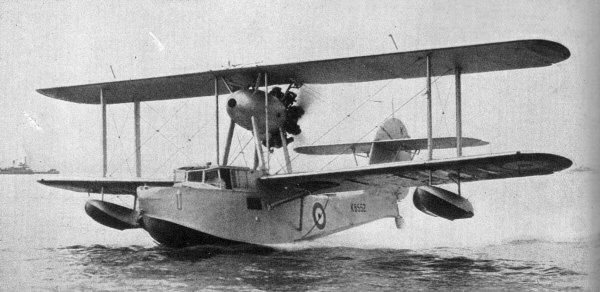
Supermarine Walrus aircraft – though it proved ultimately unsuitable for operations in Iceland, it had the advantage that it could land almost anywhere.

At 01:47, Icelandic time, on 10 May, HMS Berwick launched one of its Supermarine Walrus reconnaissance aircraft from its aircraft catapult. The principal aim of the flight was to scout the vicinity of Reykjavík for enemy submarines, which the Naval Intelligence Division had convinced itself were operating out of Icelandic harbours.

The Walrus was given orders not to fly over Reykjavík but – either accidentally or as the result of a miscommunication – it flew several circles over the town, making considerable noise. At this time, Iceland possessed only passenger aircraft, which did not fly at night, so this unusual event awoke and alerted a number of people. The Prime Minister of Iceland Hermann Jónasson was alerted about the aircraft, as were the Icelandic Police. The acting chief of police, Einar Arnalds, surmised that it most likely originated from a British warship bringing the expected new ambassador. This was correct, though it was not the whole story.

Werner Gerlach, the German consul, was also alerted to the aircraft. Suspecting what was about to happen, he drove down to the harbour with a German associate. With the use of binoculars, he confirmed his fears and then hurried back. At home, he arranged for the burning of his documents and tried unsuccessfully to reach the Icelandic foreign minister by telephone.

=== Down at the harbour ===
At 03:40, an Icelandic policeman saw a small fleet of warships approaching the harbour, but could not discern their nationality. He notified his superior, who notified Einar Arnalds, the acting chief of police. The laws of neutrality to which Iceland had committed forbade more than three warships from a belligerent nation from making use of a neutral harbour at the same time. Any aeroplanes from such ships were forbidden from flying over neutral territorial waters. Seeing that the approaching fleet was about to violate Icelandic neutrality in two ways, Arnalds began to investigate. Down at the harbour, he viewed the ships for himself and decided they were probably British. He contacted the foreign ministry, which confirmed that he should go out to the fleet and announce to its commander that he was in violation of Icelandic neutrality. Customs officers were ordered to prepare a boat.

Meanwhile, marines on Berwick were being ordered aboard Fearless, which would take them to the harbour. The seasickness and inexperience of the troops were causing delays and the officers were becoming frustrated. Just before 05:00, Fearless, loaded with about 400 marines, began moving toward the harbour. A small crowd had assembled, including several policemen still waiting for the customs boat. The British consul had received advance notice of the invasion and was waiting with his associates to assist the troops when they arrived. Uncomfortable with the crowd, Consul Shepherd turned to the Icelandic police. "Would you mind ... getting the crowd to stand back a bit, so that the soldiers can get off the destroyer?" he asked. "Certainly," came the reply.

Fearless started disembarking immediately once it docked. Arnalds asked to speak with the captain of the destroyer, but was refused. He then hastened to report to the Prime Minister, who ordered him not to interfere with the British troops and to try to prevent conflicts between them and Icelanders. Down at the harbour, some of the locals protested against the arrival of the British. One Icelander snatched a rifle from a marine and stuffed a cigarette in it. He then threw it back to the marine and told him to be careful with it. An officer arrived to scold the marine.

=== Operations in Reykjavík ===
The British forces began their operations in Reykjavík by posting a guard at the post office and attaching a flyer to the door. The flyer explained in broken Icelandic that British forces were occupying the city and asked for co-operation in dealing with local Germans. The offices of Landssími Íslands (state telecommunication service), RÚV (broadcasting service), and the Meteorological Office were quickly occupied by the British to prevent news of the invasion from reaching Berlin.

Meanwhile, high priority was assigned to the capture of the German consulate. Arriving at the consulate, the British troops were relieved to find no sign of resistance and simply knocked on the door. Consul Gerlach opened, protested against the invasion, and reminded the British that Iceland was a neutral country. He was reminded, in turn, that Denmark had also been a neutral country. The British discovered a fire upstairs in the building and found a pile of documents burning in the consul's bathtub. They extinguished the fire and salvaged a substantial number of records.

The British had also expected resistance from the crew of Bahia Blanca, a German freighter which had hit an iceberg in the Denmark Strait and whose 62-man crew had been rescued by an Icelandic trawler. The Naval Intelligence Division believed the Germans were actually reserve crews for the German submarines they thought were operating out of Iceland. The unarmed Germans were captured without incident.

Within an hour of landing, Force Sturges had established an advanced guard across a 14 km (8.7 mi) wide front around Reykjavík. By requisitioning local transport, the marines managed to deploy across 75 km (47 mi) by 6pm, investigating a seaplane base (Hvalfjörður) and two potential airstrips (Kaldaðarnes and Sandskeið). In respect to the Kaldaðarnes landing ground, this deployment consisted of a platoon of 2nd Battalion Royal Marines armed with most of the battalion's Bren guns with orders to open fire on any German troops disembarking from aircraft. They had been briefed to expect landings by up to 2,000 German paratroops, but there were none. By this time, the four Royal Navy ships had departed.

== Aftermath ==
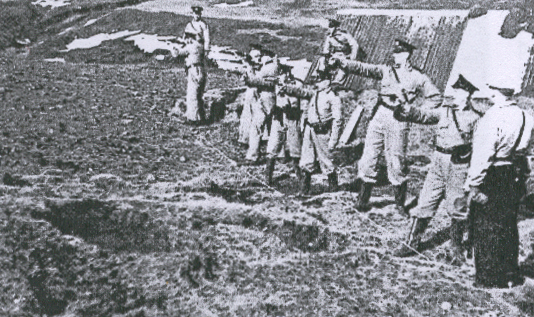
Icelandic police officers undergoing firearms instruction in 1940

At six o’clock on the evening of 10 May, Chamberlain offered his resignation to George VI, who summoned Churchill and asked him to form a government. At about that time, the government of Iceland issued a protest, charging that its neutrality had been "flagrantly violated" and "its independence infringed", noting that compensation would be expected for all damage done. The British promised compensation, favourable business agreements, non-interference in Icelandic affairs, and the withdrawal of all forces at the end of the war. In the following days, air defence equipment was deployed in Reykjavík and a detachment of troops sent to Akureyri. The initial invasion force was ill-equipped, only partially trained and insufficient for the task of occupation and defence of the island. Over the next two weeks, Force Sturges noted a cooling of relations with the local population as concerns grew that the British presence would attract German naval shelling or aerial bombing. However, no incidents were recorded. There was also apprehension over the potential for relationships between the marines and local women.

On 17 May, troops of the 147th Infantry Brigade, part of the 49th (West Riding) Infantry Division, began arriving on the troop ships Franconia and Lancastria, to relieve the marines and by 21 May all but the coastal artillery elements of Force Sturges had been withdrawn. On 26 May the 147th Infantry Brigade was reinforced by the 146th Infantry Brigade, accompanied by the HQ of the 49th Division. On 16 June 1940, the 4th Infantry Brigade from the 2nd Canadian Infantry Division brought the occupying force up to the strength of a full division. Commonwealth occupation forces eventually totalled 25,000 infantry with elements from the Royal Air Force, Royal Navy and Royal Canadian Navy. One year after the invasion, forces from the still officially neutral United States were stationed on the island without the agreement of the Icelandic government, relieving the bulk of British ground forces. US forces grew considerably after the US entered the war on 7 December 1941, reaching as many as 30,000 army, naval and air force personnel at any one time. The RAF and RCAF continued to operate from two Royal Air Force stations through to the end of the war.

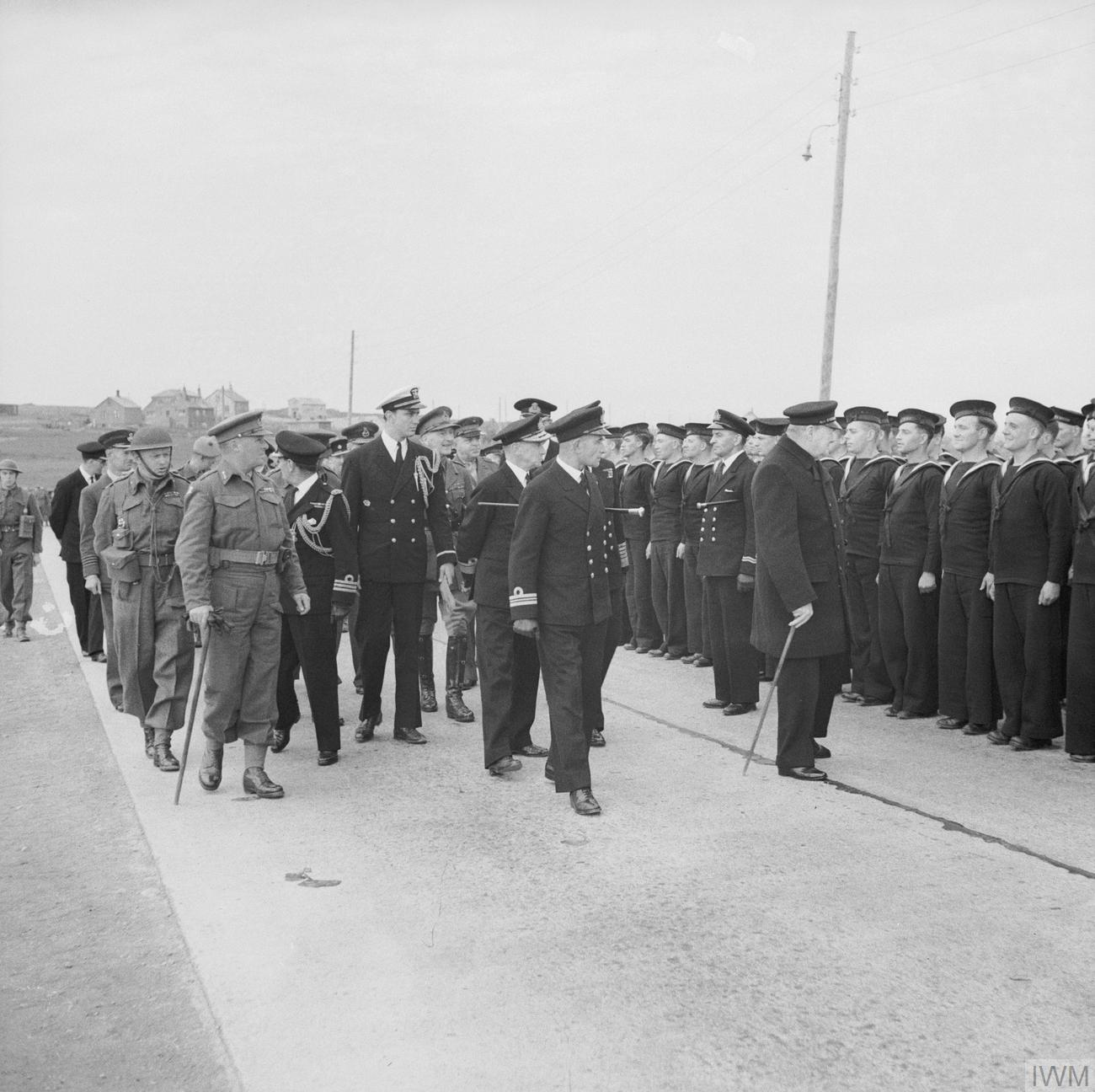
The new British Prime Minister Winston Churchill, who stopped off in Iceland on the return journey from the Atlantic conference, inspecting a Royal Navy detachment at Reykjavik, August 1941

The UK invaded to forestall a German occupation, to provide a base for naval and air patrols, and to protect merchant shipping lanes from North America to Europe. In this, the invasion was successful. However, the presence of British, Canadian, and US troops had a lasting impact on the country. Foreign troop numbers in some years equalled 25 per cent of the population or almost 50 per cent of the native male population. Icelanders were and remain divided about the war and occupation – what is sometimes referred to as the "blessað stríðið" ("Blessed War"). Some point to the subsequent economic revival, others to loss of sovereignty and social upheaval. The occupation required the building of a network of roads, hospitals, harbours, airfields and bridges that had an enormous positive economic impact. The Icelanders severely censured the sexual relationships between troops and local women, which were causing considerable controversy and political turmoil. Women were often accused of prostitution and of being traitors; 255 children were born from these liaisons, the ástandsbörn, 'children of the situation'.

In 1941, the Icelandic Minister of the Judiciary investigated "The Situation", and the police tracked 500+ women who had been having sex with the soldiers. Many were upset that the foreign troops were "taking away" women, friends, and family. During 1942 two facilities opened to house such women who had relations with the soldiers. Both closed within a year, after investigations determined that most liaisons were consensual. About 332 Icelandic women married foreign soldiers.

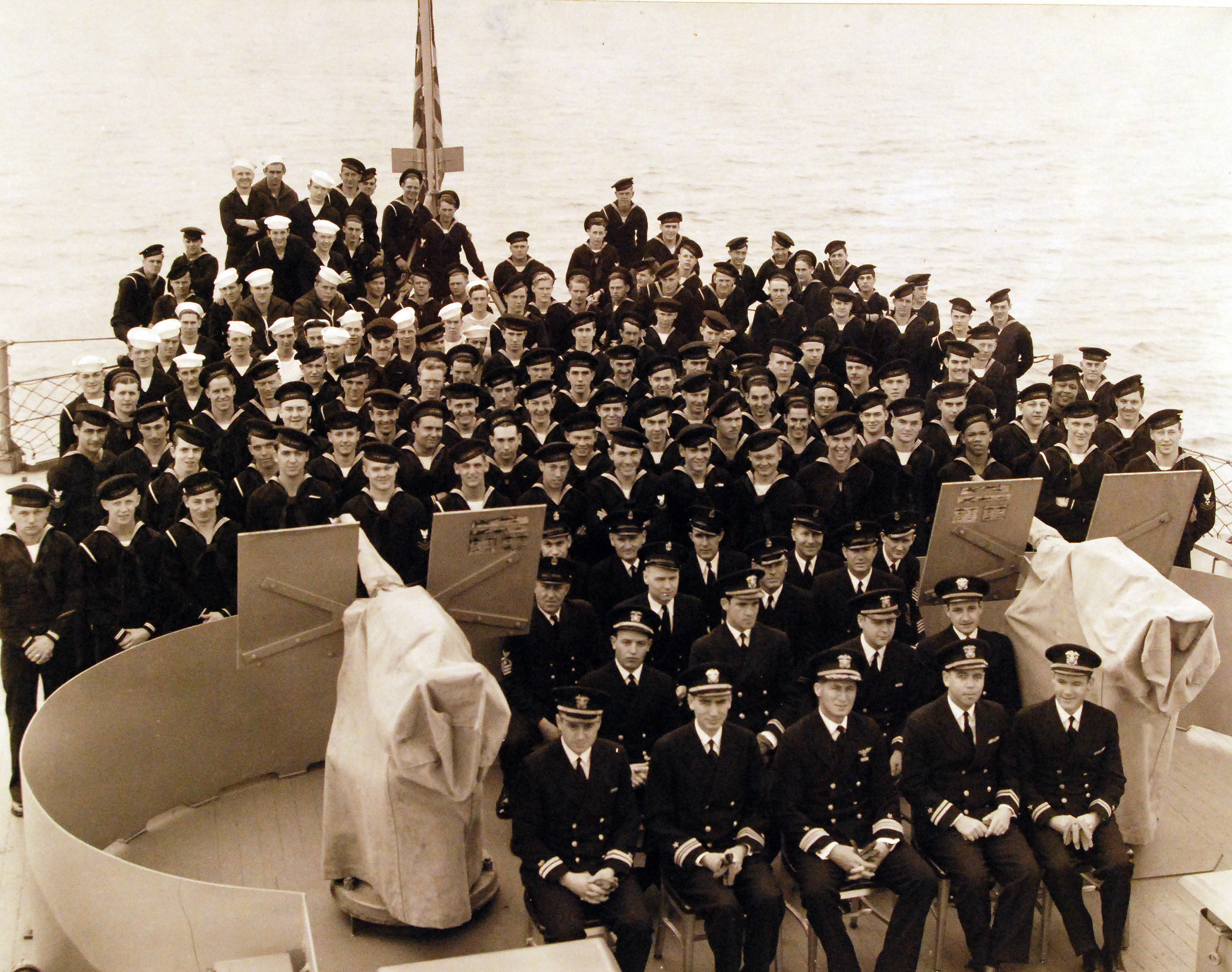
Officers and crew of USS Barnegat (AVP-10) at Hvalfjörður, Iceland, August 1942

On 17 June 1944, Iceland declared itself a republic. The Keflavík Agreement signed during 1946 between the US and the Republic of Iceland stipulated that the American army would leave the country within six months, and Iceland would take possession of Keflavík Airport. This did not happen for decades, and a substantial US military presence remained in Iceland until 30 September 2006. At the end of hostilities most British facilities were given to the Icelandic government.

Although the British action was to forestall any risk of a German invasion, there is no evidence that the Germans had an invasion planned. There was German interest in seizing Iceland. In a postwar interview, Walter Warlimont claimed that

"Hitler definitely was interested in occupying Iceland prior to [British] occupation. In the first place, he wanted to prevent "anyone else" from coming there; and, in the second place, he also wanted to use Iceland as an air base for the protection of our submarines operating in that area".

After the British invasion, the Germans composed Operation Ikarus, a report to examine the feasibility of seizing Iceland. The report found that while an invasion could be successful, maintaining supply lines would be too costly and the benefits of holding Iceland would not outweigh the costs (there was, for instance, insufficient infrastructure for aircraft in Iceland).

== See also ==
- Ástandið, a term about the influence of British and U.S. soldiers on Icelandic women
- British occupation of the Faroe Islands
- List of expansion operations and planning of the Axis powers

== Sources ==
- Bittner, D. F. (1983). The Lion and the White Falcon: Britain and Iceland in the World War II Era. Hamden: Archon Books. ISBN 0-208-01956-1.
- Fairchild, B. (2000). "Decision to Land United States Forces in Iceland, 1941". Command Decisions. CMH. Pub 70-7. Archived from the original on 7 October 2017.
- Karlsson, G. (2000). Iceland's 1100 Years: History of a Marginal Society. London: Hurst. ISBN 1-85065-420-4.
- Miller, J. (2003). The North Atlantic Front: Orkney, Shetland, Faroe and Iceland at War. Edinburgh: Birlinn. ISBN 1-84341-011-7.
- Whitehead, Þ. (1995). Milli vonar og ótta: Ísland í síðari heimsstyrjöld [Between Hope and Fear: Iceland in World War II]. Reykjavík: Vaka-Helgafell. ISBN 9979-2-0317-X.
- Whitehead, Þ. (1999). Bretarnir koma: Ísland í síðari heimsstyrjöld [The British are Coming: Iceland in World War II]. Reykjavík: Vaka-Helgafell. ISBN 9979-2-1435-X.
