= Ástandið =

Influence of Allied soldiers on Icelandic women during World War II

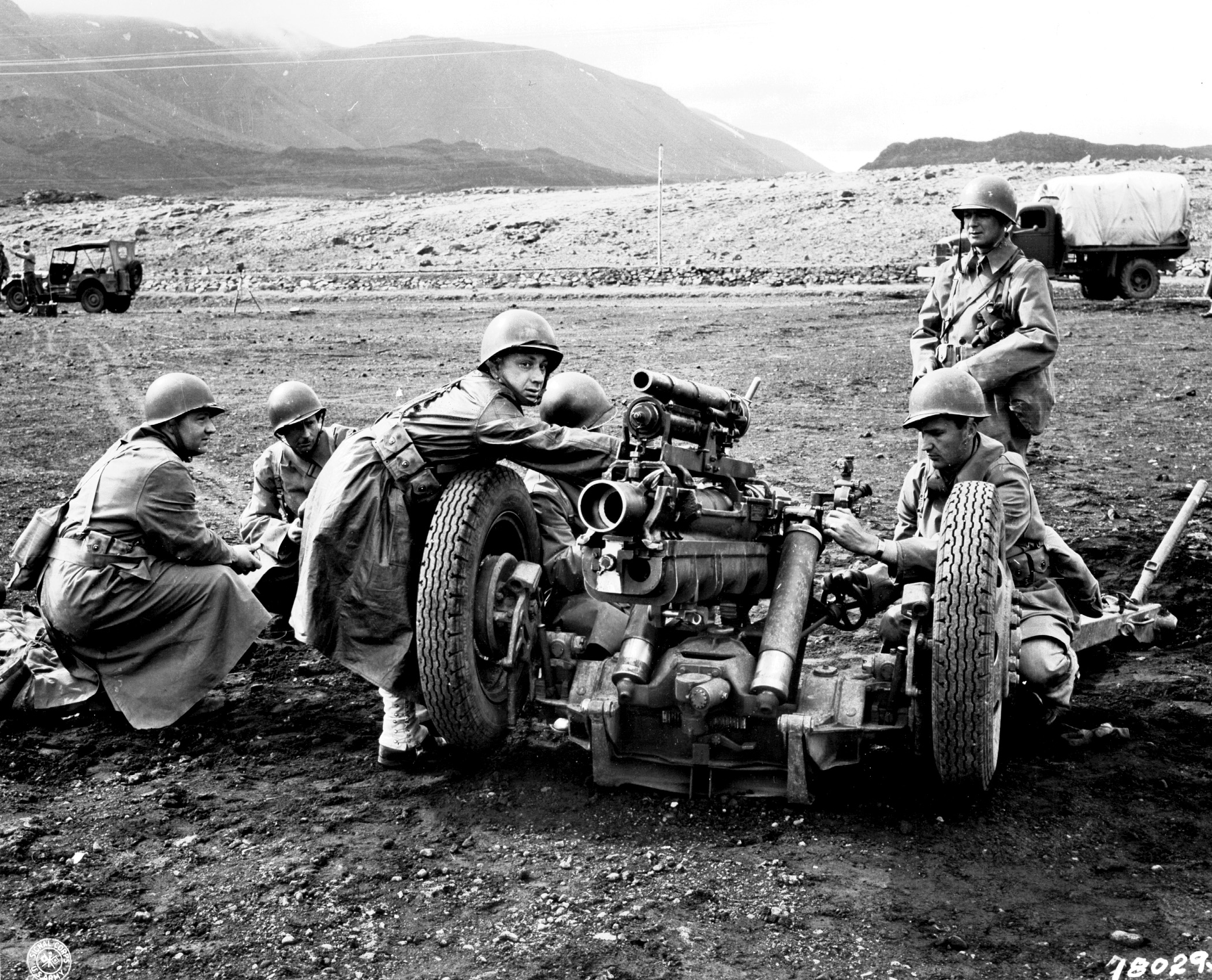
American soldiers training in Allied-occupied Iceland in June 1943

Ástandið (Icelandic: lit. 'the condition' or 'the situation') is a term used in Iceland to refer to the influence Allied troops had on Icelandic women during the Second World War. At its peak the number of Allied soldiers equaled almost 50% of the native male population. Many of the foreign soldiers would court Icelandic women, and estimates of the number of local women who married foreign soldiers go into the hundreds. Such interaction between Icelandic women and foreign troops was not always well received, and the women involved were often accused of prostitution and betraying their home country. Children born from such unions are known in Icelandic as ástandsbörn (lit. 'children of the condition/situation').

During the British invasion of Iceland in 1940, crowds of Icelanders gathered on the streets to watch the British servicemen, and it did not go unnoticed that many Icelandic women were attracted to them. Immediately discussions began over what effect this would have, and minimal interaction with the occupational forces was encouraged; but this proved to be difficult, as many Icelanders had jobs which in some way led them to have interactions with British and later American servicemen. A committee was formed at the behest of the Icelandic government, which published a report noting the prevalence of engaging with Icelandic prostitutes among Allied troops. The Icelandic government tried unsuccessfully to reduce the Allied soldiers' encounters with Icelandic women, but with time the issue lapsed, as all Allied forces evacuated the island upon the conclusion of the war in 1945.

American forces returned to Iceland in 1951 as part of the Iceland Defense Force during the Cold War. In order to reassure the Icelandic government, all American troops were now restricted to the Keflavík Air Base, which remained operational until 2006, when the US briefly left, only to return in 2016.

== See also ==
- Iceland in World War II
- British occupation of the Faroe Islands
- Battle of the Atlantic
