= Operation Ikarus =

Proposed German plan to invade Iceland

- Part of the Western Front of the Second World War
- Operational scope: Kingdom of Iceland and the North Atlantic; Navy proposals of June 1940 envisaging landings at Reykjavík and Akureyri
- Type: Amphibious invasion
- Planned: June–September 1940
- Planned by: Kriegsmarine
- Objective: Occupation of Iceland and removal of the British, establishment of a base to support submarine warfare against the United Kingdom
- Outcome: Eventual cancellation

Operation Ikarus (Unternehmen Ikarus or Fall Ikarus in German) was a Second World War German plan to invade Iceland, which had been occupied by British forces during Operation Fork in 1940. The plan was never realized.

The purpose of the British move was to prevent a German invasion of the island. The German plan was not realized due to the perceived risk of the operation, as even though an invasion of Iceland was considered possible, defence and resupply was not, given British naval supremacy.

== Background ==
During the First World War Denmark had remained neutral, and Iceland, governed directly from Copenhagen at the time, had not played a significant role in the conflict. The British blockade of Germany during this war had been maintained across a line from Shetland to Norway and thus had not directly involved Iceland. In their 1929 tract on German strategy during the First World War, Die Seestrategie Des Weltkrieges the German naval warfare theorist Wolfgang Wegener had foreseen that in the event of a German invasion and occupation of Norway the British could have fallen back to a Greenland-Iceland-Shetland line of blockade, but stated that they would have had difficulty maintaining an effective blockade along this line given the distances involved. Despite this, Wegener, whose analysis was influential amongst German naval officers before the Second World War, considered that the only way to totally eliminate the threat of a British blockade along the Shetland-Faroes-Iceland line was to capture either the Faroes or Shetland, though Wegener assessment was that this was beyond the capabilities of Germany. Adolf Hitler had also been gifted a copy of Wegener's book, and had been impressed by his arguments.

In pre-war war games in early 1939, an invasion of Iceland had been proposed. However, the chance of success given Franco-British control of the entrances to the North Sea was assessed as low. Soon after the beginning of the Second World War in 1939, thought was given again in Germany to an attack on Iceland. According to post-war testimony given by Walter Warlimont, head of the Oberkommando der Wehrmacht's Operations Division, Hitler wished to pre-empt any occupation of Iceland by the Allies and to provide a base to support submarine operations in the Atlantic through an occupation of the island. Karl-Jesko von Puttkamer, a naval representative on the Supreme Military Council also recalled Hitler suggesting an invasion of the island in meetings in the spring of 1940.

On 9 April 1940 German forces launched Operation Weserübung, a simultaneous invasion of both Denmark and Norway. Metropolitan Denmark was quickly occupied and surrendered on the same day after six hours of fighting, whilst resistance by Norwegian and Allied forces in southern and central Norway had largely ceased by early May, with Allied forces evacuating Åndalsnes on 1–2 May and Namsos on 2–3 May 1940. This left the Faroes and Iceland (by then a self-governing territory under the Danish king) undefended. In order to pre-empt any German invasion, British forces occupied the Faroes on 13 April, and, following a refusal by the government of Iceland to join the Allies, Iceland was occupied on 10 May.

Hitler was angered by the news of the British occupation of Iceland and, when forces became no longer needed for relieving Narvik after the withdrawal of the Allied forces there in early June 1940, ordered the preparation of an invasion to capture Iceland. German naval officer Hans-Jürgen Reinicke then began preparing the plan, dubbed Operation Ikarus (Fall Ikarus).

== German plan ==
=== Naval and air forces ===
The German plan for invasion involved the German passenger ships Europa and Bremen. These ships were included as they were particularly fast, could make the transit from Tromsø in German-occupied Norway to Iceland in less than three days, and were already being prepared as troop-transports for the relief of German forces at Narvik. Bremen was to be equipped with two ferries to carry troops ashore whilst a suitable docking location was secured, and four weeks' supplies were to be brought to sustain the invasion force. However, these ships had cranes only capable of lifting 5 tons, and the invasion plan called for heavier equipment than this and more materiel than could be carried aboard these two passenger ships. The invasion force would therefore have required other steamships, with the fastest ones available, the motor vessels Potsdam and Gneisenau (not to be confused with the German battle-cruiser of the same name, also potentially earmarked for the invasion) being capable slower, meaning that an invasion force would require another day and a half to cross from Norway to Iceland. The plan also called for the motor vessels Neidenfels and Moltkefels to be used, each capable of around 15 knots.

The invasion fleet was planned to be escorted by a battlegroup including the battlecruisers Gneisenau and Scharnhorst. However, by the time the plan was presented to Hitler on 20 June, the Scharnhorst had already been torpedoed in Operation Juno on 8 June and was out of commission for months. Gneisenau was torpedoed on the same day as the presentation of the plan, leaving the only forces that would have been available to escort the force as a single heavy cruiser and four destroyers.

Once the invasion fleet sailed beyond the reach of German bomber and fighter aircraft based in Norway, the only German aircraft available to support the fleet would have been a limited number of long-range Focke-Wulf 200 Condor maritime patrol aircraft based at Bordeaux in German-occupied France. These aircraft could only have carried out a limited number of sorties each day at the long ranges involved in the invasion. The German Luftwaffe assessed, based on outdated intelligence, that no airfields could be constructed on Iceland for fighters and bombers to support the invasion.

=== Ground forces ===
The Kriegsmarine feasibility study for the invasion called for approximately 5,000 troops built around a battlegroup from the 2nd Mountain Division. This battlegroup was already in Norway at Tromsø and earmarked for the relief of Narvik, having been issued with German and Norwegian vehicles for additional mobility, and reinforced with tank, engineer, motor, and motor-cycle reconnaissance detachments. Under the plan for Fall Ikarus, an amphibious engineer battalion, two construction companies, a 10.5 cm coastal artillery battery, and an anti-aircraft battalion would have been added. The invasion force was to be commanded by Lt. Gen. Erwin Engelbrecht, commander of the 163rd Infantry Division.

=== Invasion plan ===
Ground troops would have landed at Akureyri in the north and Reykjavík in the west. Potential other landing sites could have included Seyðisfjörður in the east of the island and in the region of Hrútafjörður in the north west. The forces would have been motorised, such that the island could be rapidly occupied along the island's road network. The plan predicted the complete conquest of the island, and the overwhelming of its British garrison (at the time a single brigade reinforced by a docking operations company), within four days of the invasion. The assessment of the German naval staff was that the best time to launch the invasion was after September 1940, when the nights became longer giving more cover for operations.

== Iceland garrison ==
The initial British invasion of Iceland on 11 May 1940 had been carried out by a single battalion of Royal Marines light infantry without a heavy weapons company, and supported only by a single battery of mountain howitzers. However, by the time that Operation Icarus was being planned in June that force had been replaced by Alabaster Force of three brigades (two British, one Canadian), though spread thinly across the Reykjavík, Akureyri and Seyðisfjörður areas. Coastal anti-ship and anti-aircraft guns had been emplaced at Reykjavík under operation of a company strength Naval Party of the Royal Navy, and the Royal Navy Fleet Air Arm was operating a pair of Walrus flying boats from Reykjavík harbour.

== Cancellation and subsequent history ==
Neither the German navy planners nor the Luftwaffe were enthusiastic about the plan for Fall Ikarus. Admiral Raeder, commander of the German navy, whilst recognising the strategic necessity of eventually occupying Iceland in order to break the British blockade that in his view presented a "continuous and unbearable threat to German safety", considered the plan highly risky given the "impossibility of continuous supply" of the invasion force and that it would "require the full employment of the navy". Hermann Göring, commander of the Luftwaffe, stated that the invasion could be supported only if it were possible to "create landing and taking off facilities for the fighters and bombers on the island" that in the view of the Luftwaffe did not yet exist in Iceland.

In a meeting with Hitler on 20 June 1940, Raeder's pessimistic assessment of the plan led to its cancellation. However, Hitler revisited the idea of invading Iceland in 1942, reacting angrily when it was discovered that the Allies had constructed air bases on the island after he had been assured that this was not possible. Hitler proposed deploying special forces to raid the island, though this idea was not developed further.

== Assessment ==
Raeder, after the meeting in which Ikarus was cancelled, cast doubt on the ability of Germany to carry out the plan, stating that "the task consists of transferring large numbers of men and quantities of materiel to waters for the most part controlled by the enemy". After the end of Operation Weserubung, German naval theorist Wolfgang Wegener assessed it as an incomplete victory due to Germany's failure to conquer Iceland and the Faroes.

In a 1993 article, former naval officer and historian Carl O. Schuster assessed the chance of success of the plan as slim, stating that "[g]iven Germany's inadequate naval strength, Operation Icarus had no real prospect of success". Schuster went on to say that "The basic strategic concept for a German seizure of Iceland was sound" and that "Despite the long odds, then, had Icarus been successfully executed by Germany, the island's loss would have had a disastrous effect on the Allied war effort." Schuster also highlighted the lack of air support that might have, in Schuster's view, been partially ameliorated had the cancelled German carrier Graf Zeppelin been available.

== See also ==
- Expansion operations and planning of the Axis Powers
- Iceland during World War II
- Operation Fork - British invasion of Iceland
- Operation Weserübung - German invasion of Denmark and Norway
- History of Iceland
