= Layforce II =

Layforce II was the name given to an ad hoc formation of British Commandos during the Second World War. The force was under command of Major Peter Laycock the second in commando of No. 10 (Inter-Allied) Commando. Layforce II included the French Troop from No. 10 (Inter-Allied) Commando and three Troops from No. 4 Commando. The force carried out deception raids against the coastline of German-occupied Europe. The raids, codenamed Operation Menacle and Hardtack, were finally abandoned because they encouraged the Germans to reinforce their positions, which, in the longer term, could be disadvantageous to the Allies.
