= DEN/ICE Agreements =

Series of multilateral treaties

The DEN/ICE Agreements are a series of multilateral treaties that provide for the joint financing of air traffic control, communications, and meteorological services in Greenland, Iceland, and the Faroe Islands for civil aircraft crossing the North Atlantic Ocean above the 45th parallel north. The agreements were negotiated and are implemented within the International Civil Aviation Organization (ICAO), a specialized agency of the United Nations.

== History ==
The first joint financing agreement for North Atlantic travel—the Agreement on Joint Financing of Weather Ships on the North Atlantic—was concluded in September 1946. The next year, in April 1947, Canada, France, Iceland, the Netherlands, the United Kingdom, and the United States agreed to jointly finance the continued operation of a LORAN station in Vík, Iceland, that had been established by the British during the Second World War. At Denmark's request, similar agreements were struck in 1949 to allow for joint funding of stations in Greenland and the Faroe Islands.

In 1956, the Agreement on the Joint Financing of Certain Air Navigation Services In Iceland and the Agreement on the Joint Financing of Certain Air Navigation Services In Greenland and the Faroe Islands were concluded in Geneva and were opened to any state that wishes to participate in the funding of aviation services for the North Atlantic. Both agreement entered into force in June 1958. The agreements were updated and amended in 1982 and 2008. The ICAO is the depositary for the agreements.

== Financing arrangements ==
Under the agreements, Iceland and Denmark contribute five per cent of the operating costs of the aviation services. Since 1974, the operators of aircraft crossing the North Atlantic have been assessed user charges. Any amount that remains to be funded is paid by the states parties to the agreements. Each state party is allocated a percentage of the remaining total which is based on a percentage of North Atlantic crossings that are performed by commercial airlines located in the state.

In 2003, the cost of the arrangements was US$26.7 million; close to 80 per cent of the total funded the services in Iceland, with the remainder going to Greenland and the Faroe Islands.

== Provided services ==
=== Greenland ===
1. Air traffic control and communications centre in Søndre Strømfjord
2. Meteorological stations in Danmarkshavn, Narsarsuaq, and Egedesminde
3. VHF telecommunications stations in Prince Christian Sound, Frederiksdal, Qaqatoqaq, and Kulusuk
4. Satellite earth station in Frederiksdal
5. Non-directional beacons in Prince Christian Sound, Kulusuk, Søndre Strømfjord, Holsteinsborg, Simiutaq Island

=== Iceland ===
1. Air traffic control and communications centre in Reykjavík operated by the Icelandic Civil Aviation Administration
2. Meteorological stations in Bolungarvík, Höfn, and Keflavík
3. Extensive system of telecommunications stations and links, including VHF, radar, microwave, telephone, and data links connecting Reykjavík and Greenland, the Faroe Islands, Canada, Scotland, and England.

=== Faroe Islands ===
1. Voice and data connection between the Faroe Islands and Iceland
2. Non-directional beacon in Mykines
3. Secondary Surveillance Radar at Sornfelli
4. ADS-B at Spáafelli and Klubbin

== States parties ==
As of 2016, the following states are party to the agreements:

- Belgium
- Canada
- Cuba
- Denmark
- Egypt
- Finland
- France
- Germany
- Greece
- Iceland
- Ireland
- Italy
- Japan
- Kuwait
- Netherlands
- Norway
- Pakistan
- Qatar
- Russia
- Singapore
- Spain
- Sweden
- Switzerland
- United Kingdom
- United States

Prior to its dissolution, Czechoslovakia was a party to the agreements. The Czech Republic withdrew from the agreements in 1995 and Slovakia withdrew in 1996.
