= RAF Kaldadarnes =

Former Royal Air Force station in Iceland

RAF Kaldadarnes
- Near Selfoss, Iceland
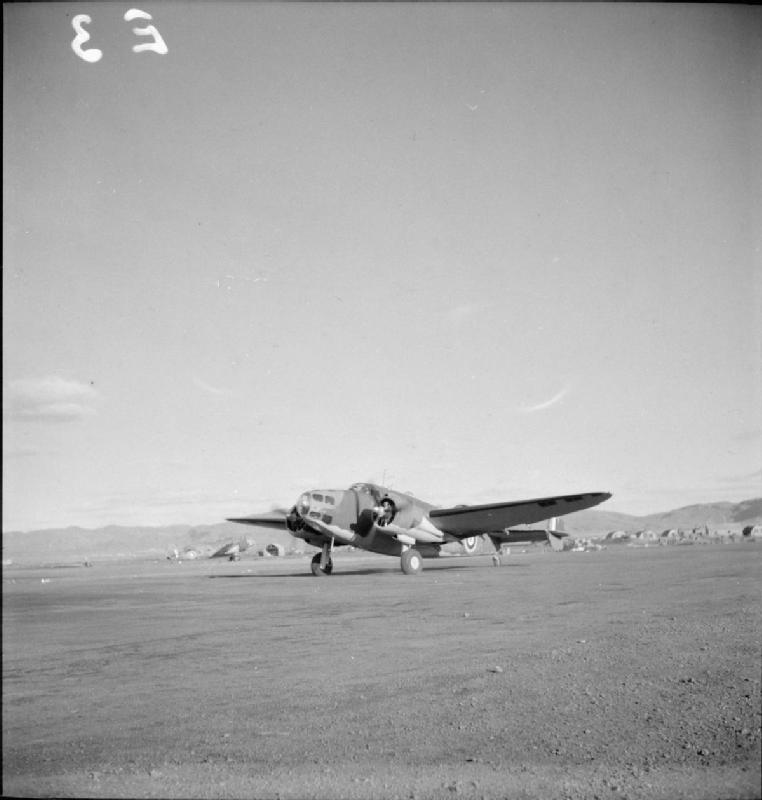
- A Lockheed Hudson of No. 269 Squadron prepares to take off on a patrol over the North Atlantic from RAF Kaldadarnes.

Site information
- Type: Royal Air Force Station
- Owner: Icelandic Government
- Operator: Royal Air Force

Location
- Location within Iceland
- Coordinates: 63°55′52.33″N 021°10′14.78″W

Site history
- Built: 1940
- In use: 1941-1945
- Battles/wars: Second World War

Airfield information
Runways
Direction	Length and surface
10/29	990 metres (3,248 ft) concrete
17/35	927 metres (3,014 ft) concrete
05/23	1295 metres (4,249 ft) concrete

Royal Air Force Kaldadarnes or more simply RAF Kaldadarnes is a former Royal Air Force station at Kaldaðarnes, near the town of Selfoss, Iceland.

== Beginnings ==
The station was built in 1940 by the British Army and used by the Royal Air Force from March 1941 and throughout the remainder of the Second World War.

On 2 September 1942 the war artist Eric Ravilious was lost after he flew from Kaldadarnes.

=== Royal Navy ===
During 1943 lodger facilities for an RN Air Section were granted from RAF Coastal Command to provide and maintain, in storage, Fairey Swordfish biplane torpedo bomber aircraft for escort carriers on North Atlantic convoy duties and for MAC-Ships.

The Air Section opened on 1 May 1943 with its accounts 'on books of HMS Baldur II' It was commanded by Lieutenant Commander(A)(P) A.G. Mayhew, RNVR, under the administrative control of Admiral Commanding Iceland. RAF Coastal Command maintained the airbase and it could accommodate around 100 ratings and six officers.

The Fairey Swordfish for storage were flown in from the Long Island-class escort carrier HMS Archer (D78) on 5 May and its embarked squadrons 819 and 892 spent the night at the airbase.

RAF Coastal Command intended to reduce RAF station to Care & Maintenance status offering the Admiralty control of the site, but as little use had been made of the airbase this was rejected and the Air Section was withdrawn on 2 November.

== Squadrons ==
Sqn	Aircraft	Joined	Departed	From → To	Notes
48	Lockheed Hudson V & III	6 January 1942	23 September 1942	RAF Wick → RAF Sumburgh	Detachment only.
98	Fairey Battle V Hawker Hurricane I	31 July 1940	15 July 1941	RAF Gatwick → DB	Last Squadron move prior to being disbanded.
269	Avro Anson I Lockheed Hudson I & III	April 1940	6 March 1943	RAF Wick → RAF Reykjavik	Detachment initially prior to Squadron move.

After the end of the Second World War the British Government handed the airfield over to the Icelandic Civil Aviation Authority and it was used for a short while until it was closed. It is now in ruins with the decaying runways, perimeter track, dispersals and site of some of the buildings still visible on satellite images in 2024.

There is a memorial to No. 269 Squadron RAF at the closest public access point, situated in the modern airfield of Selfoss.

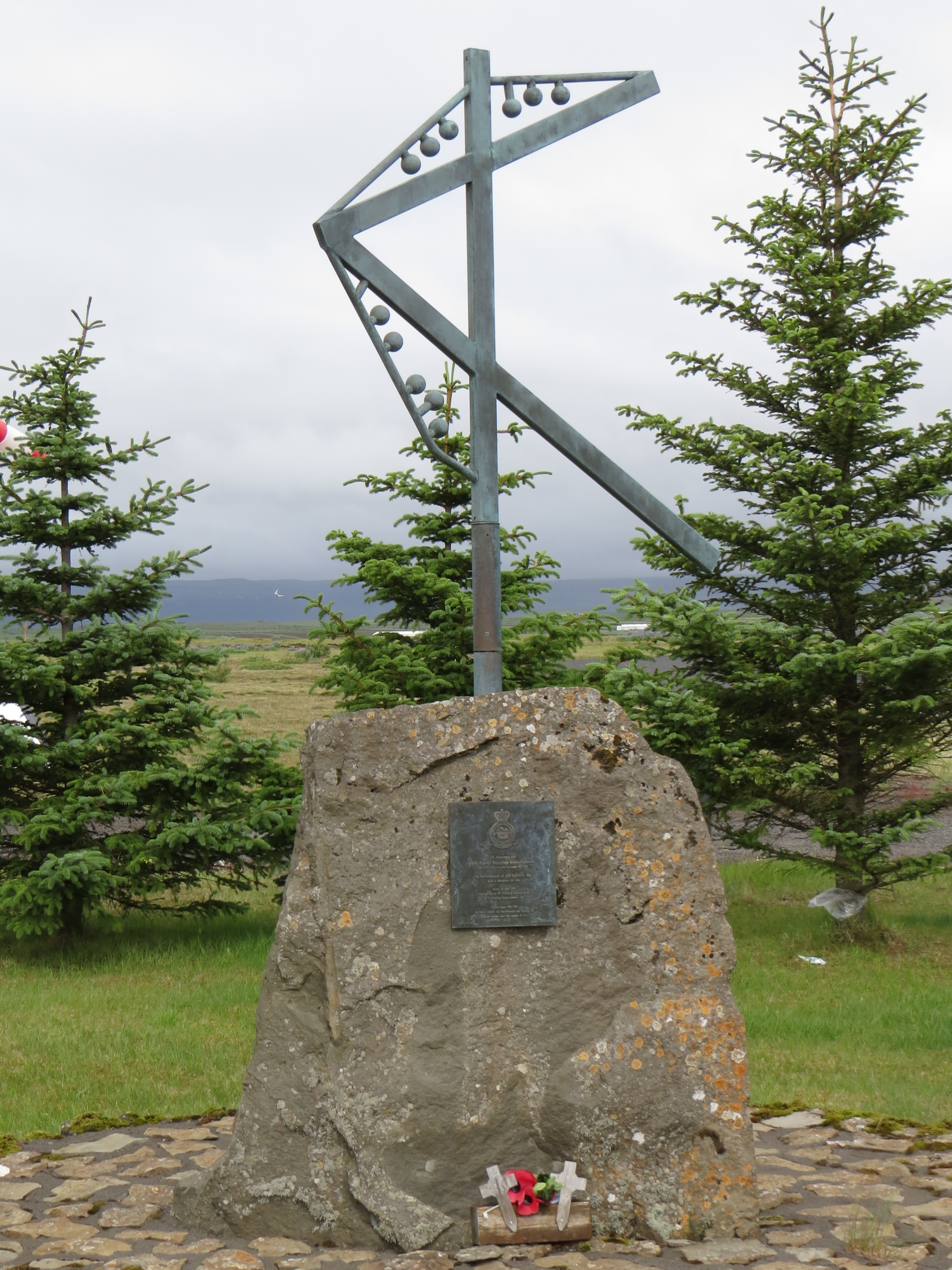
The 269 Squadron Memorial at RAF Kaldadarnes, near Selfoss in Iceland
