= Operation Manacle =

Operation Manacle was the name given to a series of British Commando raids during the Second World War.

The raids were conducted by Layforce II and ad hoc formation formed by three troops from No. 4 Commando Their objectives were to take out German strong-points and to conduct reconnaissance, on the coastline of France. They were unofficially known as the Menday Force named after the commander of Layforce II. No.4 Commando participated in Manacle 5 at Qnival and Manacle 8 at Quend Plage operating from Dover. The Manacle, and associated Hardtack raids, were finally abandoned on orders from Combined Operations Headquarters because they encouraged the Germans to reinforce their positions which, in the longer term, could be disadvantageous to the Allies.
