= Icelandic Civil Aviation Administration =

The Icelandic Civil Aviation Administration (Icelandic: Flugmálastjórn Íslands) is the aviation authority of Iceland. The authority has its headquarters in Reykjavík. Icelandic Civil Aviation Administration has changed its name to Icelandic Transport Authority (2013) ICETRA.

== See also ==
- DEN/ICE Agreements
