= Wolfgang Wegener =

Officer in the Imperial German Navy (1875–1956)

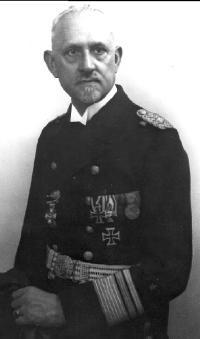
Wolfgang Wegener around 1925

Wolfgang Wegener (September 16, 1875 in Stettin – October 29, 1956 in Berlin-Zehlendorf) was an officer in the Imperial German Navy, retiring in 1926 with the rank of Vizeadmiral (vice-admiral).

He is noted as the originator of a series of influential works, published between 1915 and 1929, outlining the so-called Wegener Thesis. This thesis criticized the naval strategy adopted by Germany in the First World War, and proposed an alternative strategy based on threatening the sea lines of communication of the United Kingdom with both surface and sub-surface forces. The Wegener thesis is often regarded as a significant contribution to German naval strategy in the Second World War, although the extent to which this was actually the case is disputed.

== Personal life ==
Wolfgang Wegener was the son of Dr Eduard Wegener, (5 August 1837, Luckow – 20 February 1909, Stettin), a medical consultant, and Martha Zitelmann (13 May 1847, Jasenitz – 13 April 1923, Wilhelmshaven). He married Therese Gierke, in Berlin on 22 June 1901; they had three sons and a daughter. One of his sons, Edward Wegener (1904–1981), also reached the rank of Vice Admiral.

== Career ==
Wegener was educated at the König-Wilhelms-Gymnasium (King Wilhelm high school). Through the influence of his uncle by marriage, the future Grand-admiral Henning von Holtzendorff, he entered the service of the Imperial German navy in 1894. He served on the cruiser Deutschland from 1897 to 1899, reaching the rank of Leutnant zur See. He became a gunnery specialist, serving as First Gunnery Officer on the armored cruiser SMS Blücher from 1909 to 1910. From 1912 to 1917, he served as chief of staff to the Admiral commanding the First Battle Squadron, reaching the rank of Fregattenkapitän in 1917. From 1917 to 1918, he commanded firstly the light cruiser Regensburg and then another light cruiser, Nürnberg. Following the Armistice, he continued to serve in the new Reichsmarine, being appointed Kapitän zur See on 21 January 1920, and Konteradmiral in 1923. His final appointment was as Inspector of Gunnery, based at Wilhelmshaven. He achieved the rank of Vizeadmiral in 1926. Not long after, he was forced into retirement by the "uniformity" policies (which included stifling of different opinions in the naval ranks) of Adm. Erich Raeder.
