= Keflavik Agreement =

1946 United States agreement with Iceland

The Keflavík Agreement (Icelandic: Keflavíkursamningurinn [ˈcʰɛplaˌviːkʏrˌsamniŋkʏrɪn]) was an agreement made in 1946 between the government of the United States and the newly established Republic of Iceland, following the conclusion of World War II. This agreement stipulated that the American army would leave the country within six months and that the Icelanders would take possession of Keflavík Airport. With this agreement, all former agreements would be annulled.

The conditions of the agreement did not last long, however. In 1951, a new agreement was made through NATO. According to this defense treaty, the United States accepted responsibility for the defence of Iceland for an unspecified period of time. This new agreement annulled the Keflavík Agreement.
