= Robert Sturges =

British Army general (1891-1970)

Lieutenant-General Sir Robert Sturges KBE CB DSO
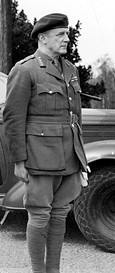
- Sir Robert Sturges in April 1944.
- Born: 14 July 1891; Borough of Wokingham, England
- Died: 12 September 1970 (aged 79); Exeter, England
- Military career
- Allegiance: United Kingdom
- Branch: Royal Navy (1908–1912); Royal Marines (1912–1946)
- Service years: 1908–1946
- Rank: Lieutenant-General
- Commands: Special Service Group (1943–1945); Royal Marines Division (1940)
- Conflicts: First World War: Gallipoli campaign; Battle of Jutland; Second World War: Invasion of Iceland; Battle of Madagascar
- Awards: Knight Commander of the Order of the British Empire; Companion of the Order of the Bath; Distinguished Service Order; Mentioned in Despatches (2)

Lieutenant-General Sir Robert Grice Sturges, KBE, CB, DSO (14 July 1891 – 12 September 1970) was a senior Royal Marines officer who fought in both the First World War and Second World War.

== Military career ==
Sturges joined the Royal Navy in 1908. Commissioned a sub-lieutenant on 15 May 1912, he transferred to the Royal Marines as a lieutenant from the same date (confirmed on 19 December 1914).

He served in the First World War, seeing action in the Gallipoli campaign and the Battle of Jutland, and receiving promotion to captain on 30 January 1917. He was officially transferred to the Royal Marine Light Infantry on 30 January 1917.

Between the wars, he was promoted to major on 17 June 1929, and to lieutenant colonel on 1 April 1936. He was brevetted colonel and promoted to colonel on 3 April 1939 (seniority 31 December 1938).

During the Second World War he was the commander of the British occupation of Iceland in May 1940. He was promoted to acting colonel commandant and temporary brigadier on 4 June, and was mentioned in despatches in July. He was Commander of the British occupation of Madagascar in 1942. He went on to be Commander of the Special Service Group (Commandos) in 1943. He was described as "intrepid in action, ruddy in countenance, and forcefully bucolic in language". He retired in 1946.
