= Kaldaðarnes =

Coordinates: 63°55′52.33″N 21°10′14.78″W

Kaldaðarnes, Iceland

Kaldaðarnes is an ancient farm estate in Iceland on the banks of the Ölfus river, around 8 km (5.0 mi) west of Selfoss. Records of a farm at this location exist back to year 1200 AD where it is stated that Kaldaðarnes was one of few farms with rights to offer ferry service across the Ölfus river.

At Kaldaðarnes there was a church during Middle Ages and in the church there was a wooden cross that was believed to have healing powers, drawing pilgrims to the church. The cross was cut down and burned during the Lutheran reform.

Kaldaðarnes was an estate with 10 to 12 tenements. Between 1754 and 1846 there was a leprosy hospital at Kaldaðarnes and during 1945 to 1948 it was the location of a rehabilitation centre for alcoholics.

During World War II, the British forces built a large military camp at Kaldaðarnes as well as an airfield which was called RAF Station Kaldadarnes. Following a flood in Ölfus river, the military camp was closed down but the airfield remained in operation. After the war, the buildings were torn down and moved to the Keflavík airport. The airstrip continued to be used during the early years of Icelandic aviation but is now in ruins.
