= Sandskeið =

Gliding center in Iceland

Coordinates: 64.060°N 21.574°W

Sandskeið (Icelandic pronunciation: [ˈsan(t)ˌsceiːθ]; ICAO: BISS) is the main gliding center in Iceland and home of the Icelandic gliding club (Icelandic: Svifflugfélag Íslands) since 1936. It is situated 20 km to the east of Reykjavík, the Icelandic capital, by Route 1. It is a big grass airfield, the main runway is running 150/330 and is 200 x 1.300 meters with the new extension to the east which is 50 x 300 m to allow for greater height when winch launching. There is also a north/south runway 60 x 800 m. On the north side there is an 18 x 800 m paved runway running 150/330. Height above sea level is 180 m (600 ft). The radio frequency used is 119,90 MHz and there is an ATZ open when gliding activity is present which goes from gnd to 3000 ft msl and covers the airfield and a 12 km to the south, and 5 km to the east.

There is a 10 km long mountain ridge only a few hundred meters from the airfield rising 400 – 550 meters above the landscape, that makes ridge soaring possible in winds between east and through north to westerly winds. Mountains and glaciers to the north and east give rise to lee waves, and sea breeze often comes in from the west coast, rarely from the south coast. Thermals are present from April until the end of August. Daily gliding activity from 1 June until 1 September. Weekends in May and September.

The club's fleet consists of the following: ASK 21, LS 4, Duo Discus Turbo, Super Dimona 115 Hp turbo and an LS 8 18m. Privately owned gliders are 3 Lak 12's, 1 Club Astir, 1 ASH 25 and 1 LS 4b.
