= List of expansion operations and planning of the Axis powers =

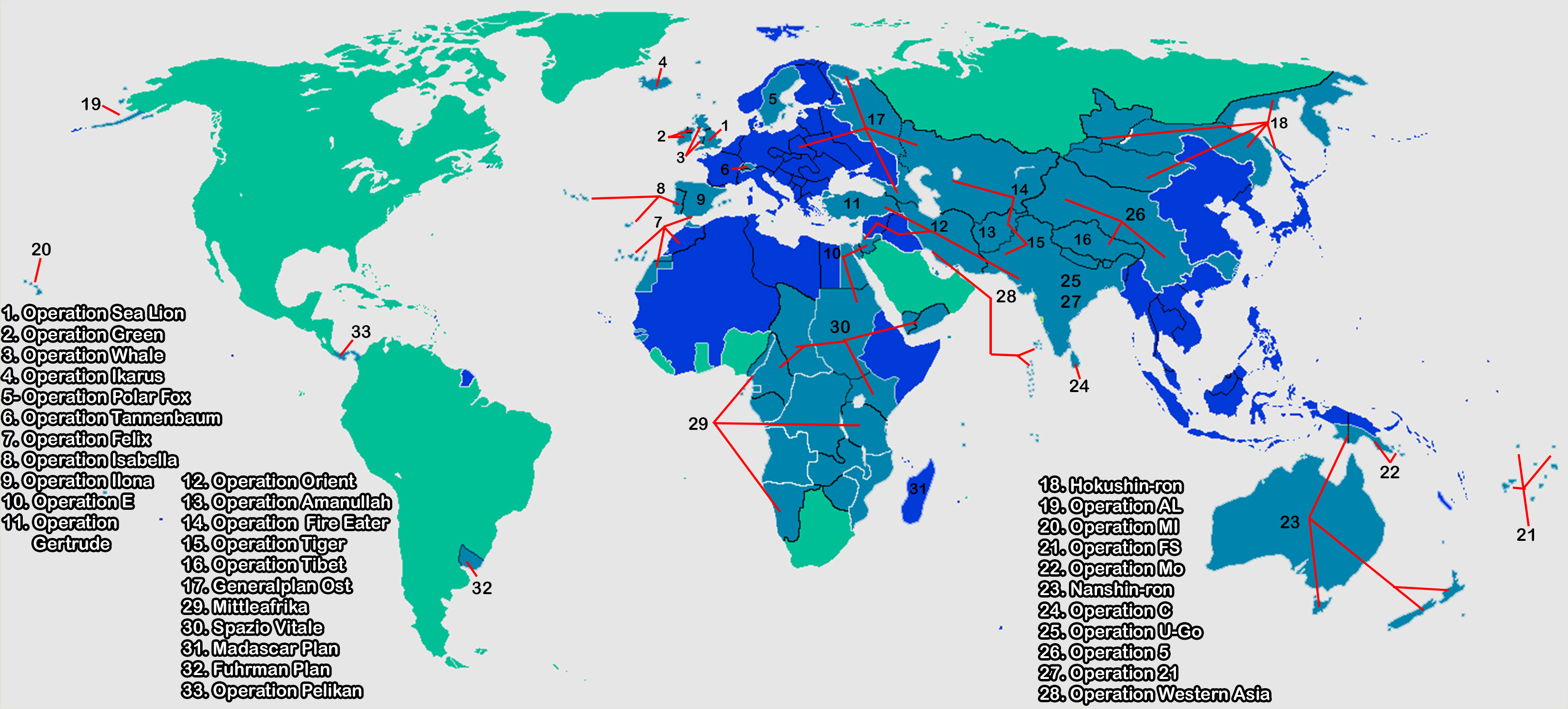
A map showing most of the projected Axis Powers operational plans for expansion that did not reach its objectives, or were not possible to execute during World War II, with the main goal to establish a global New Order.

Planning for global territorial expansion of the Axis powers; Germany, Italy and Japan, progressed before and during the Second World War. This included some special strike plans against the Allied nations (with similar intentions to the James Doolittle raid special Allied Strike). The Kingdom of Romania, a de facto major member of the Axis with a contribution on par with Italy's, is also included.

== Operational plans of Germany, Italy and European allies ==
=== 1935–1939 [before WWII] ===
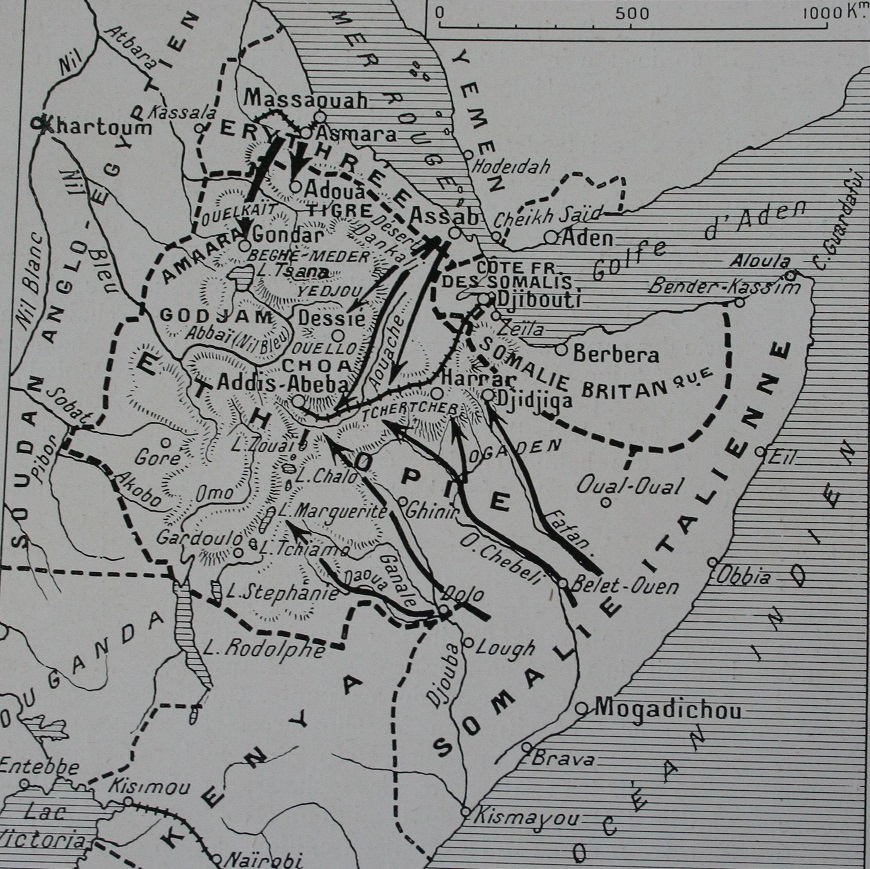
Map of the Italian operations during the conquest of Ethiopia

- Mussolini's plans to conquer Egypt and Sudan since 1935 (postponed in favour to avoid British entrancy in the Italo-Ethiopian Conflict).
- The Guayana-Projekt, a German plan to take over and colonize French Guiana as a bridgehead into the South American continent.
- De Bono's invasion of Ethiopia (Italian military operation to annex Ethiopian Empire)
  - Italian conquest of Absinia after the Second Italo-Ethiopian War in 1936
- Axis operations and territorial ambitions during Spanish Civil War (1936–1939)
  - Italian military intervention in Spain
    - Italian occupation of Mallorca (included the intention of annexing the Balearic Islands, Ceuta and Spanish Morocco, and then creating a client state in Spain)
    - Operation Schulmeister (proposed cession of the Balearic Islands by the Spanish Republic to Italy in exchange of neutrality in the Spanish Civil War).
  - German involvement in the Spanish Civil War
    - Proposed cession of the Balearic or Canary Islands by the Spanish Republic to Nazi Germany in exchange of neutrality in the Spanish Civil War.
- German plans to colonize Argentine Patagonia.
- German march into Austria (annexation of Austria into Nazi Germany as Ostmark on 12 March 1938)
  - Operation Otto (cancelled planned invasion of Austria, never carried out due to pacifical Anschluss)
- German Occupation of Czechoslovakia (German annexation of the Sudetenland and establishment of the Protectorate of Bohemia and Moravia in 1938, and of the puppet Slovak Republic in 1939)
  - Fall Grün (planned invasion of Czechoslovakia, to be carried out in September 1938. Averted by the signing of the Munich Agreement. Not to be confused with the military plan to invade Ireland by the same name, see below)
  - First Vienna Award, Slovak–Hungarian War and Hungarian invasion of Carpatho-Ukraine (annexation of southern Czechoslovak territories and Transcarpathia to Hungary in March 1939)
- 1939 German ultimatum to Lithuania (German plans to invade and conquer Lithuania if they don't give Memelland to Nazi Germany, which happened in March 1939)
  - Nazi proposals of a German-Lithuanian military alliance to invade Poland during Danzig crisis, returning the Vilnius Region to Lithuania in exchange of being turned into a German Puppet State.
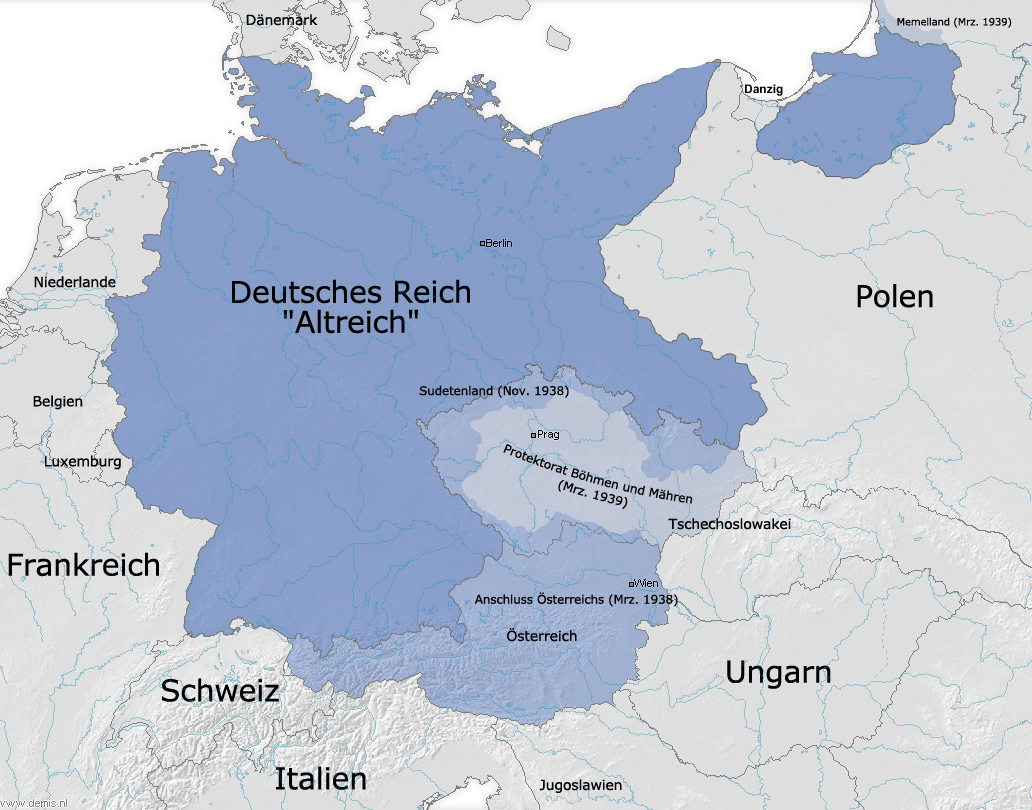
    Nazi Germany expansionism before WW2
- Danzig crisis (German plans from January to August 1939 concerning Poland before the start of Polish-German War)
  - "little solution" proposed by Albert Forster (German invasion and annexation of Free City of Danzig to the Reich as a "Korperschaft", while also forcing Poland to join to Anti-Comintern Pact, making them a client state with the rest of its borders intact and renovation of German–Polish declaration of non-aggression).
  - "big solution" supported by Nazi Party (German conquest of Danzig and Polish Corridor to the Reich, then compensating Poland, turned into a landlocked and German Puppet state, with German support to annex parts of Soviet Ukraine in a future Nazi-Soviet War, giving Poland an exit to the Black Sea).
- Italian occupation of Albania after the Italian invasion of Albania in April 1939
- Nazi–Soviet Union relations and Nazi–Soviet economic relations [1934–1941] (Russo-German plans to develop a partition of the Eastern Hemisphere, or at least Eastern Europe, since 1 September 1939 to 1941).
  - Partition of Eastern Europe between USSR and the Third Reich
    Molotov–Ribbentrop Pact (First partition of Eastern Europe: Finland, Estonia, Latvia, Eastern Poland and Bessarabia to USSR's Sphere of influence. Lithuania, Western Poland, Czechoslovakia, Hungary and Romania to Nazi Germany's one)
    - German–Soviet Boundary and Friendship Treaty (Second Partition of Eastern Europe: Exchange of Lithuania to USSR, and Central Poland to Nazi Germany)
    - German–Soviet Border and Commercial Agreement (Final Partition of Eastern Europe: Baltic states, Eastern Poland, Bessarabia and Bukovina annexed to USSR. Western Poland and Bohemia annexed to Nazi Germany while Hungary, Romania and Bulgaria are puppet states. Finland stays independent)
  - German–Soviet Axis talks (considered plans to join the Soviet Union to the Axis powers and its New World Order)
    - First Offer from Axis to the Soviets in Partitioning the world (Soviet Baltic states, Eastern Poland, Moldovian SSR, Eastern Turkey, Iran, Afghanistan, British India and Mongolia in Soviet Sphere of Influence. Finland and Sakhalin being a neutral zone between German and Japanese Empires)
    - Second Offer from Soviet to Axis in Partitioning the world (the same, but Bulgaria, Finland, Western Turkey and Sakhalin included in Soviet Sphere of Influence)

=== 1939–1941 [before Eastern Front] ===
==== German operations ====
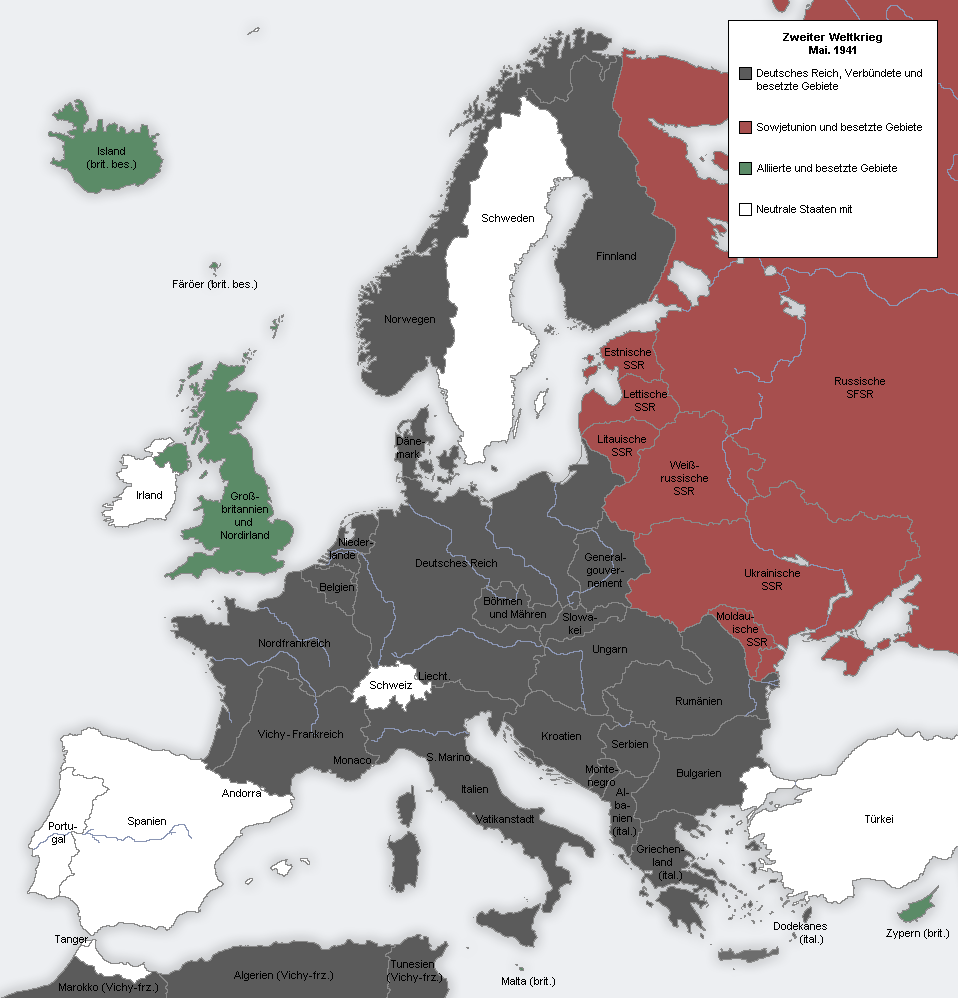
Axis powers expansion over Europe before Invasion of Russia.

- Fall Weiss (German invasion of Poland. Carried out 1 September 1939)
  - Operation Himmler (false flag operation to provide a casus belli for the invasion of Poland, including the Gleiwitz incident)
  - German invitations to Slovakia, Lithuania, Hungary and the Ukrainian Nationalists to be part of the Fourth Partition of Poland on 4–10 September 1939. Consisting of Lithuania receiving the Vilnius Region, Hungary the Turka and Sambir citys, and Ukraine the southern Kresy (cancelled due to Soviet approachments).
    - Slovak invasion of Poland (Slovakian invasion and annexation of Polish disputed territories)
    - Canaris Memorandum of September 12, 1939 (German outlines to support the Ukrainian national uprising in Western Ukraine, before Soviet occupation of Eastern Poland, to create a pro-Nazi Ukraine puppet state against southern USSR's sphere of influence).
    - German proposals to Kazys Škirpa to transform Lithuania into a German Protectorate in the north, and the rest of Central Poland as another German Protectorate (never carried out due to 2nd Molotov-Ribbentrop Pact).
- Operation Weserübung (invasion of Denmark and Norway. Carried out 9 April 1940)
- Operation Gelb (invasion of the Netherlands, Belgium and Luxembourg. Carried out 10 May 1940)
- Operation Rot (invasion of France and principal western attack. Carried out 5 June 1940)
  - Case Brown (projected German-Italian invasion of Southern France through the Rhône and possibly Switzerland to avoid Maginot Line. Modified in lesser extensions after the great success of Gelb and Rot Operations)
- Projekt Burgundy (projected creation of a "Model Aryan Pan-European State" by the SS in 1940, initially from the Franche-Comté to Burgundy, then a restoration of Lotharingia. Never carried out due to German Occupation of France not including Vichy France territories, and Himmler moving to the Eastern Front.)

Planned Axis invasion of England

- Unnamed Abwehr-Ossewabrandwag operation (projected pro-Nazi Afrikaner nationalist revolt against the Union of South Africa and British Empire after August 1940, not carried out)
- Operation Sea Lion (invasion of Great Britain after September 1940, not carried out)
  - Operation Herbstreise (a planned series of deception operations to support Sea Lion)
  - Operation Green (invasion of Ireland in support of Sea Lion, also known as Fall Grün. Not to be confused with the military plan to invade Czechoslovakia by the same name, see above)
  - Operation Whale (German Operations to instigate nationalist uprisings and support Scottish independence and Welsh independence movements)
- Mediterranean Plan (Projected invasion of Gibraltar, Malta, North Africa, Suez, and the Middle East by German, Italian, Spanish and Vichy French forces to cut off British naval supremacy in the Indo-Mediterranean and menace Soviet Caucasian Front in the Black Sea, plus the capture of the Canary Islands, the Azores and the Cape Verde islands to destroy British and American commerce in the Atlantic as also Free France control of French Africa. Planned to be carried out after September 1940. Never carried out due to not achieving Plan Z and Hitler's preference over Operation Barbarossa)
- Madagascar Plan (projected German occupation of French Madagascar by the SS to forcibly deport Jews of Europe to there. Planned to be carried out after September 1940. Never carried out due to British victory in Battle of Britain, cancelled in 1942)
- German military mission in Romania (Deployment of German forces to protect the oil refineries at Ploiești and to turn the remnants of Romania in the German Sphere of influence against Soviets in Bessarabia, carried out in September and October 1940).
- Operation Ikarus (invasion of Iceland, not carried out)
- Operation Felix (Spanish/German joint plan for control of Gibraltar, Canary Islands, Cape Verde, and Azores, it included the potential invasion of Portugal, Morocco and Spanish Sahara).
  Planned Axis invasion of Spain
  - Unnamed operation (subsequent occupation of Madeira)
- Unnamed operation (first attempt at reinforcing Italian Libya with German forces)
- Operation Tannenbaum (German-Italian invasion plan for Switzerland and Liechtenstein)
- The Fuhrmann Plan (attempted German occupation of Uruguay in 1940. Never carried out due being discovered by Uruguayan government)
- Operation Strafe (German planned invasion of Bulgaria in case they reject to join Tripartite Pact. Developed on 30 November 1940, cancelled after get Bulgarian support)
- Operation Marita (invasion of Greece via Bulgaria, Germany supporting the Italian efforts. Carried out 6 April 1941.)
- Operation Alpenveilchen (planned German invasion of Italian Albania to cross into Greece. Cancelled in favour of Yugoslav route.)
- Operation 25 (Axis invasion of Yugoslavia. Carried out 6 April 1941)
- Operation Merkur (invasion of Crete. Carried out 20 May 1941.)
- Operation Sonnenblume (Erwin Rommel and the Afrika Korps reinforcing the Axis defenses of Cyrenaica in 1941)
  - Erwin Rommel mandate of 10 April 1941 (German attempted invasion of Egypt to conquer Egypt and occupy the Suez Canal)
- Führer Directive No. 30 (Projected German intervention in Anglo-Iraqi War in support of Arab nationalists in the Kingdom of Iraq after the 1941 Iraqi coup d'état)
  - Paris Protocols (Vichy France-German cooperation in the Middle East with the goal of a projected invasion of British Iraq through French Syria and maybe German occupied Caucasus. Never carried out due to British offensive on Syria–Lebanon)
  - Unnamed German operation involving Iran (Attempted German pressure over Iran to force them join the Axis and invade Iraq in support of Rashid Ali al-Gaylani. Rejected by Iranian authorities that were skeptical due to Axis-Soviet partnership)
- Operation Isabella (invasion of Portugal and Spain to counter any possible landing of Anglo-American troops in the Iberian Peninsula. Prepared in May 1941 and never carried out.)
- Operation Fire Eater (German-Italian plans to instigate a Pasthun rebellion against British India on the Pakistani Side and form a pro-Axis Pashtunistan state, planned to be carried out on June–July 1941. Cancelled due to being discovered by the Afghan Government with British help)
- Lossberg study (projected invasion of USSR, carried out later)
- Projected German administrative divisions of occupied European territories:
  - Greater Germanic Reich (theoretical planning mostly)
    - German annexations
      - Czechoslovak areas annexed
        - Reichsgau Sudetenland
      - Polish areas annexed
        - Reichsgau Danzig-West Prussia
        - Reichsgau Wartheland
        - Bialystok District and Zichenau annexation to Gau East Prussia
      - Belgian areas annexed
        - Eupen and Malmedy to Gau Cologne-Aachen
      - French areas annexed
        - Civil Administration Area of Alsace to Gau Baden
        - Civil Administration Area of Lorraine to Gau Westmark
      - Civil Administration Area of Luxembourg to Gau Moselland
      - Yugoslav [Slovenian] areas annexed
        - Upper Carniola annexation to Reichsgau Kärnten
        - Lower Styria annexation to Reichsgau Steiermark
    - German planned annexations
      - Civilian occupation regime of western and northern territories
        - Reichskommissariat Niederlande (implemented in 1940 as planned annexation of Greater Netherlands in the Westland Gau)
        - Reichskommissariat Belgien-Nordfrankreich (implemented in 1944)
        - Reichskommissariat Norwegen (implemented in 1940)
      - Military Administration of eastern, western and southern territories
        - German Zone of Protection in Slovakia
        - Military Administration in Poland (implemented in 1939, then turned into General Government)
        - German military administration in occupied France
        - Territory of the Military Commander in Serbia
        - German Zone in Greece
      - Generalplan Ost (planned annexation of European Soviet Union)
    - Puppet States
      - Protectorate of Bohemia and Moravia
      - Slovak Republic
      - Protectorate over Denmark
      - Quisling Norway
      - Vichy France
      - Independent State of Croatia
      - Hellenic State

==== Italian operations ====
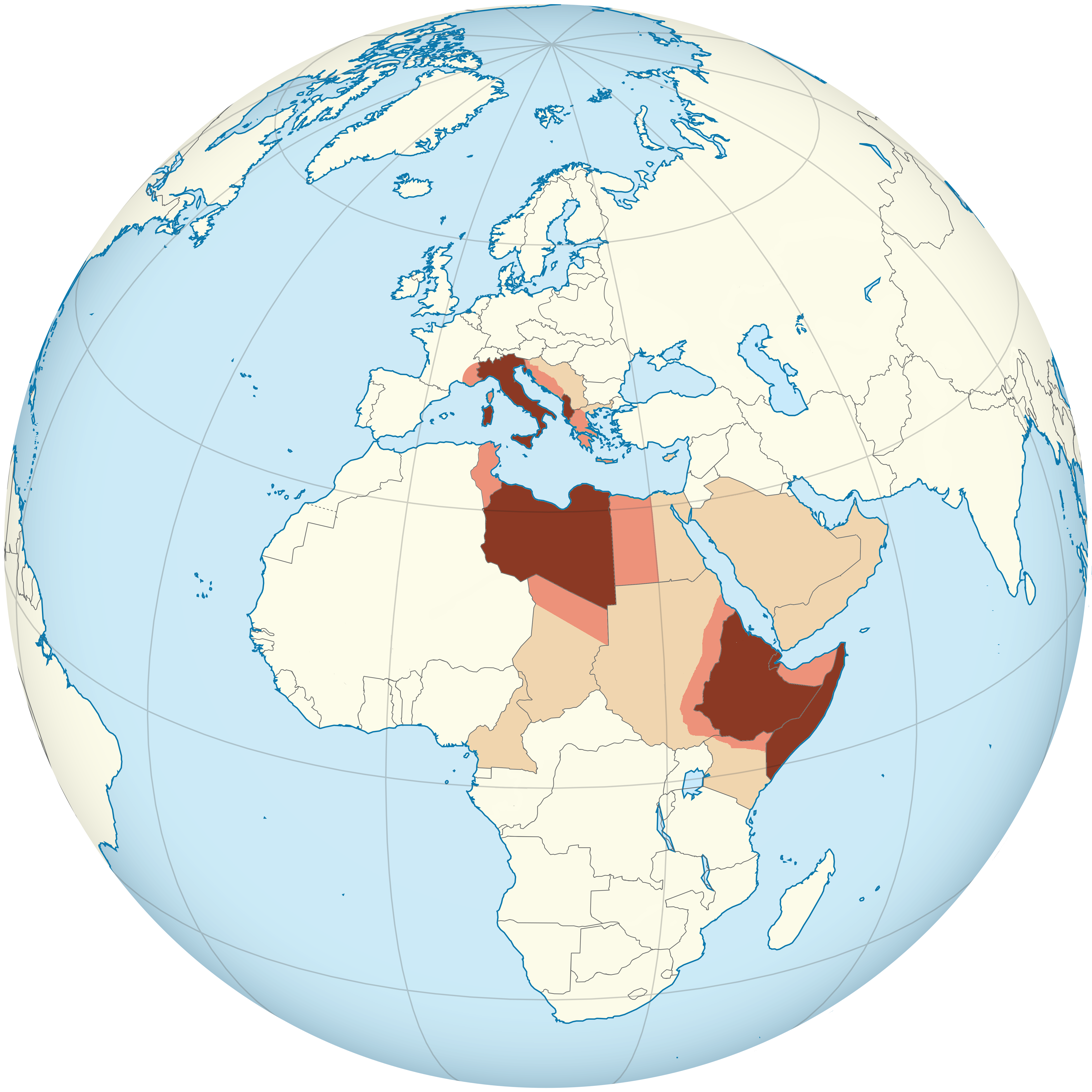
Italian imperialist ambitions under fascism during the 2nd World War

- Unnamed Italian plans to invade Yugoslavia in April 1940 (intended to be an outside conflict of the War between Germany and the Allies, never carried out due to joining Italy to the German war against Britain and France)
- Staging Plan 12 (Italian invasion of France, carried out in June 1940, there was no planning for an offensive against France beyond mobilisation)
- East African campaign (Italian Operations on the Horn of Africa that were carried out since 10 June 1940)
  - Italian invasion of Sudan (Italian uncoordinated operations to conquer Anglo-Egyptian Sudan and to help Operation E from the south, limitately carried out on 10 June 1940)
  - Italian planned invasion of Djbouit (Italian uncoordinated operations to conquer French Somaliland in June 1940, planned on January to 31 March 1940, never carried out due to Fall of France)
  - Italian incursions over Kenya (Italian uncoordinated operations to seizure strategical defensive positions inner Kenya's border, carried out on 4 July 1940)
  - Italian invasion of British Somaliland (Italian uncoordinated operations to conquer British Somaliland, carried out on 3 August 1940)
- Italian bombing of Mandatory Palestine in World War II (Italian attack on British Palestine, carried out in July 1940)
- Operation E (Italian invasion of British Egypt from Italian Libya, carried out 9 September 1940)
  - Unnamed Italian plan, proposed by Italo Balbo in April 1940, of a 2nd Italian invasion of Egypt from Italian East Africa (never carried out due to Ethiopian resistance).
- Italian bombing of Bahrain (Italian attack on British Empire's routes on Bahrain, carried out 19 October 1940)
- Plan Contingency G[reece] (First Italian attempt of invasion of Greece to conquer the Ionian Islands, the Sporades and the Cyclades islands to restore the old Venetian Empire, annexing the Epirus and Acarnania regions to Italian Albania, while also establishing a pro-Axis Greek puppet state. Carried out on 28 October 1940 and start of Greco-Italian War)
  - Unnamed Italian plans for a future Italo-Greek invasion of British Cyprus after the war (never carried out due to Italian defeat).
  - Italian militar proposals to Bulgaria on 18 October 1940 (Mussolini's invitation to Tsar Boris III of Bulgaria to be part of the Operation G and re-conquer former Bulgarian Thrace in a joint-invasion, never carried out due to economical problems).
- Projected Italian administrative divisions of occupied territories
  - Spazio vitale
    - Greater Italy
      - Governorate of Dalmatia
      - Italian occupation of Corsica
    - Italian occupation of France
    - Italian protectorate of Albania
    - Italian governorate of Montenegro
    - Independent protectorate of Croatia
    - Independent protectorate of Greece
  - Impero italiano
    - Italian North Africa (Italian Libya, Italian Tunisia, Italian Egypt)
    - Italian East Africa (Italian Eritrea, Italian Somaliland, Italian Ethiopia)

=== 1941–1944 [after Eastern Front] ===
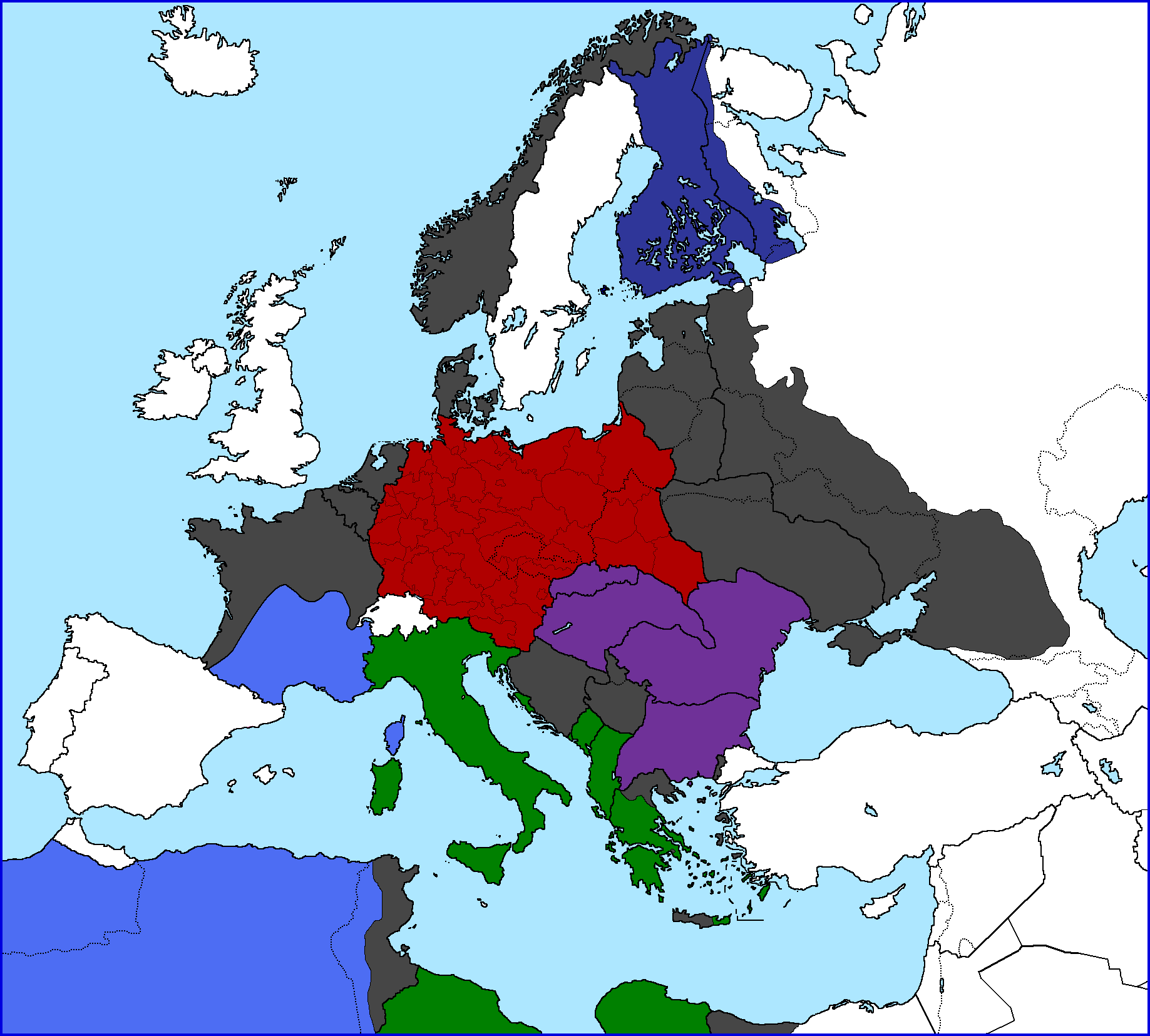
Axis powers maximum extension of European occupied territory in 1942.

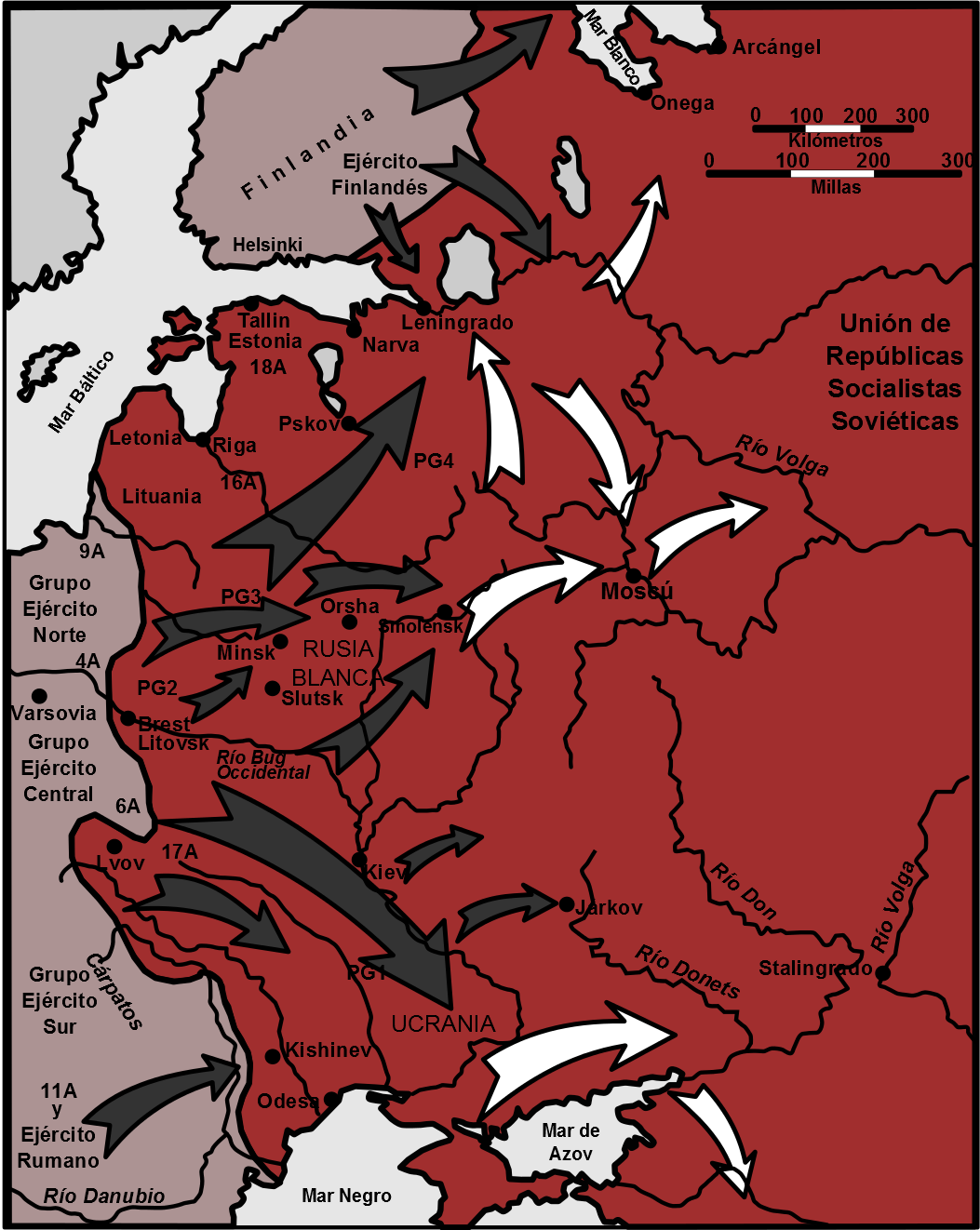
Original German Barbarossa plan, which contemplated to occupy eastern territory (far away Leningrad, Moscow, and Stalingrad) until the Arkhangelsk–Astrakhan line.

- Operation Südsee (German-Japanese naval plans to seizure the Northeast Passage and prepare further invasion of Siberia. Prepared in 1941 and cancelled due to the priorities of German war effort in the USSR)
- Operation Barbarossa (invasion of USSR, carried out 22 June 1941.)
  - Baltic offensive operation (German Army Group North invasion of Baltic states, Belarus and North Russia to Siege Leningrad. Carried out 22 June 1941)
    - Operation Beowulf (German invasion of the Estonian islands of Saaremaa, Hiiumaa and Muhu on 9 September 1941)
  - Operation München (joint Romanian-German invasion of Bessarabia and Northern Bukovina. Carried out 2 July 1941.)
  - Operation Silver Fox (plan to capture the Soviet nickel mines of Pechengsky (Finnish: Petsamo) and the port city of Murmansk. Carried out 29 June 1941.)
    - Operation Reindeer (plan to occupy the mines of Pechengsky)
    - Operation Platinum Fox (plan to capture Murmansk)
  - Sea of Azov Offensive Operation (joint German-Romanian offensive to capture the Azov coast. Carried out 12 September 1941.)
  - Operation Typhoon (strategic pincer offensive against the Moscow region. Carried out 2 October 1941.)
    - Operation Wotan (tank operation with the goal of capturing Moscow)
  - Siege of Odessa (German-assisted Romanian offensive to capture the port city of Odessa and complete the Romanian conquest of Transnistria. Carried out 8 August 1941.)
- Unnamed Operation concerning Indo-Iranian region (German plans to invade India via Persia through the projected conquered Soviet Union. Planned since June 1941, never carried out due to the strategical failure of Barbarossa Operation)
  - Rumored German instigation for a pro-Axis coup d'état in Iran before the Anglo-Soviet invasion of Iran.
- Operation Tiger (German plans to instigate a pro-Axis Pashtun insurrection on Waziristan to menace North India through Border conflicts with Afghanistan. Carried out since August 1942, but cancelled in 1944 due to economical problems)
- Operation Uzice (counter-insurgency operation by the German Wehrmacht on the occupied Yugoslavian territory)
- Operation Amanullah (German plans to instigate a pro-Axis Pashtun and Turkic insurrection in Central Asia by the Abwher in Afghanistan against Soviet and British sphere of influence, then German invasion of Afghanistan, through Soviet occupied territory, to form an Afghan puppet state headed by Amanullah Khan with a main goal to invade British India in the future. Planned to be carried out on late 1942, cancelled after defeat on Battle of Stalingrad)
- Operation Tibet (German plans to instigate a pro-Axis insurrection in Tibet to menace British Raj in 1942. Cancelled due to economical problems)
- Operation Bajadere (disputed German-Indian special forces operation for a planned strike through the Caucasus into Iran, Afghanistan and India in January 1942.)
- German unnamed plans to invade Sweden with the 25th Panzer Division in Norway (and failed attempts to have Finnish co-operation) during March 1942 after the Februarikrisen.
- Operation Wiesengrund (German plans to conquer Rybachy Peninsula by the Kriegsmarine to end the connection between Soviets and Allies. Planned to be carried out in March 1942, but cancelled in 1944)
- Amerikabomber Project (German plans to attack East Coast and Eastern United States through long-range strategic bomber from a potential occupied Azores. Developed since April 1942, never carried out due to economical problems)
- Operation Salam (German plans to instigate a pro-Axis insurrection by Egyptian nationalists in May 1942. Ended in failure)
- Operation Störfang (combined German-Romanian assault supported by Italian naval units to capture the Crimean port city of Sevastopol. Carried out 2 June 1942.)
- Operation Pastorius (failed sabotage mission to destroy military, manufacturing and transportation targets throughout the United States. Carried out 12 June 1942, but foiled during the summer.)
- Operation Herkules (attempted German-Italian air invasion of British Malta on mid-July 1942. Cancelled due to priorize Afrika Korps land-force operations in North-Africa than air Force operation in the Mediterranean after near-disaster of paratroops on Battle of Crete).
- Unnamed Operations concerning Iran and Afghanistan (German invitation for Iran and Afghanistan to join the Axis Powers and invade Soviet Union and British Raj in exchange of support for Pan-Iranist aspirations)
  - Planned establishment of pro-Axis regimes on Iran, Afghanistan, and Turkey, turning them in a "northern tier" of buffer states against Asian Russia and Soviet Central Asia, being in equal condition with Germany in exchange.
- Unnamed Operations concerning Turkey (German invitation for Turkey to join the Axis Powers and invade Soviet Union, French Syria and British Iraq in exchange of Turkish territorial expansion over Greece islands, Western Thrace, Adjara, Aleppo and the Mosul region)
  - Planned establishment of pro-Turkish and Axis puppet states on the Caucasus and Black Sea (Armenia and Georgia), with Crimea Peninsula as a frontier of German and Turkish sphere of influence.
  - Projected German-Armenian military intervention against a possible Pan-Turkism unifications, specially against a "Büyük Turan" union between hypothetical pro-Axis Turkey and Azerbaijan (as the last would be under German-Iranian sphere of influence).
- Operation Gertrud (projected German-Bulgarian-Armenian invasion of Turkey in case it joined the Allies in the beginning of the summer of 1942)
  - Planned Axis partition of Turkey (according to Treaty of Sèvres borders, in order to seizure Axis control of Anatolia) between Bulgaria (East Thrace), Greece (Turkish aegean islands and maybe former Hellenic Asia Minor), Vichy France-Syria (Alexandretta, Syrian Northern Sanjaks, Cilicia and east-central Anatolia), Iraq (Turkish Kurdistan), Italy (Lycia and portions of southern and west-central Anatolia) while also an establishment of Great Armenia and Greater Georgia. The rest of Turkey would be a joint German-Italian puppet state.
- Operation Ilona (a plan aiming to counter an Anglo-American invasion of Iberia by holding north Spanish and Portuguese ports to protect German positions in France. Prepared in 1942, never carried out.)
- Operation Blau (strategic summer offensive in southern USSR. Carried out 28 June 1942.)
  - Operation Fischreiher (plan to advance to the Volga river and capture the city of Stalingrad. Carried out 22 July 1942.)
  - Operation Edelweiss (plan to capture the oil fields of Baku and gain control over the Caucasus. Carried out 23 July 1942.)
  - German plans to develop a Caspian Sea Navy (projected expansion of Axis Naval operations into the Caspian Sea, in a coastal zone through Astrakhan to Azerbaijan, with Makhachkala as principal port for the Kriegsmarine and Regia Marina to develop further attacks against Kazakh SSR at Atyrau and the Ural river, while also possible intervention in Anglo-Soviet occupied Iran. Never carried due to defeat at Battle of Stalingrad.)
- Operation Nordlicht (scheduled operation to capture Leningrad, planned to begin on 23 August 1942. Not carried out due to the Soviet Sinyavino Offensive on 19 August.)
- Unnamed operation concerning the Levant (OKW studies to invade the Suez Canal through Turkey, and an offensive towards Mesopotamia from the Caucasus, to conquer the Levant and extent Holocaust to the Holy Land)
  - Planned invasion of Egypt by the Einsatzkommando Egypt from a 2nd front in a German Occupied Jerusalen
  - Planned Axis alliance with Arab Nationalists to expel the British and establish a Greater Arabia under Italian influence
- Unnamed operation concerning South Asia (OKW studies to invade the Hindustan from Iran and Afghanistan through occupied Soviet Central Asia)
  - Planned Axis alliance with Iranian nationalist to establish a Greater Iran under German influence, based on Pan-aryanism.
- Operation S (proposed Italian attack against the US during November 1942 or any moment during 1943. Cancelled due to Italian campaign)
- Operation Polar Fox (attempted invasion of Sweden from German occupied Norway during June–July 1943)
- Operation Citadel (pincer offensives with the goal of encircling of Red Army forces after the Battle of Stalingrad. Carried out 4 July 1943.)
- Operation Eisenhammer (planned strategic bombing operation against power generators near Moscow and Gorky)
- Operation Theseus/Aida (planned invasion of Egypt and Suez Canal from Libya to prepare a German invasion of Middle East. Ended in failure after Battle of Gazala)
  - 20 July 1942 instructions to Walter Rauff (orders from Nazi Party to extent the Final Solution in a hypothetic German occupation of British Palestine)
- Plan Orient (projected German invasion of Middle East and linking with Japanese forces to conquest India. Mostly by Afrika Corps in Libya and Egypt, but also troops from Bulgaria and the Balkans, and troops from Caucasus and Southern Russia)
- Operation Attila/Anton (occupation of un-occupied zone of France, including French Tunis, after allied landings in French North Africa to prevent an Allied invasion of Southern France)
- Operation Herkules (revision of previous plans to invade Malta)
- Operation François (attempt made by the German Army's Abwehr to use the dissident Qashqai people in Iran to make a nationalist rebellion against the British and Soviets and establish a pro-Axis regime, or at least cut the Persian Corridor).
- Operation Pelikan (German plan for crippling the Panama Canal)
- Operation Achse (German invasion of Italy after its resignation from the Axis alliance to install a puppet government under Mussolini. Carried out 8 September 1943.)
  - Establishment of Operational Zone of the Adriatic Littoral and Operational Zone of the Alpine Foothills, also development of German future plans to annex former Habsburg monarchy's Italian territories into the Reich
- Operation Rabat (alleged German plan of invasion to the Vatican City to kidnap or kill Pope Pius XII. Planned to begin on late 1943/January 1944. Not carried out because the worldwide disapprobation and possible reaction of catholic population against Italian Social Republic.)
- Operation Long Jump (alleged German plan to kill Joseph Stalin, Winston Churchill, and Franklin D. Roosevelt at the 1943 Tehran Conference)
- Operation Margarethe I (German invasion of Hungary. Carried out 19 March 1944.)
- Operation Margarethe II (scheduled German invasion of Romania)
- Operation Tanne Ost (German invasion with the goal of capturing the Finnish island of Suursaari (Russian: Gogland) in the Gulf of Finland after that country signed the Moscow Armistice on Lapland War).
- Operation Tanne West (scheduled German invasion of the Finnish-controlled Åland. Cancelled on 3 October 1944 to avoid bad relations with Sweden)
- Operation Panzerfaust (second German invasion of Hungary to depose Miklós Horthy and install a puppet government. Carried out 15 October 1944.)
- German military operations in the Slovak National Uprising to retain control of Slovakia.
- Operation Atlas (German-Arab plans to instigate an anti-British insurrection by Arab nationalists in Palestine that were loyals to the mufti of Jerusalem, Amin al-Husseini)
- Operation Maquis blanc (German-French collaborators plans to restore Vichy France authority by Guerrilla warfare and Sabotage to instigate French people, sypmathizers to the Révolution nationale, to insurrect against Free France and the Anglo-American occupation. Partially carried out from December 15, 1944, but incomplete due to economical problems).
- Operation Herbstnebel (German plans to attack in eastern Belgium and Luxembourg, east of the Meuse River. Cancelled due to election of Case Martin "big solution" plan, which formed the basis for the Battle of the Bulge.).
- Operation Wacht am Rhein (also known as the Battle of the Bulge. German panzer attack through the Ardennes with the goal of recapturing Antwerp and encircling of British Allied forces in Belgium and the Netherlands)
  - Operation North Wind (plan to encircle and destroy the U.S. 7th Army and French 1st Army and recapture Strasbourg. Carried out 1 January 1945)
    - Operation Dentist (a planned follow-up encirclement of the U.S. 3rd Army. Never carried out due to the failure of North Wind.)
- Operation Spring Awakening (offensive operation on the Hungarian part of the Eastern front with the goal of recapturing Budapest, while simultaneously defending the Nagykanizsa oil fields south of Lake Balaton)
- Projected German administrative divisions in occupied eastern territories:
  - Lebensraum (Contempled annexation of territories until the Ural Mountains in Nazi planning)
    - Lokot Republic (implemented in 1942)
    - Zuyev Republic (implemented in 1941)
    - Belarusian Central Rada (implemented in 1943)
    - Reichskommissariat Ostland (implemented in 1941)
    - Reichskommissariat Ukraine (implemented in 1941)
    - Reichskommissariat Moskowien (theorical planning only)
    - Reichskommissariat Kaukasien (theorical planning only)
    - Reichskommissariat Don-Wolga (theorical planning only)
    - Reichskommissariat Ural (theorical planning only)
    - Reichskommissariat Turkestan (theorical planning only)
- Projected Romanian administrative divisions in occupied eastern territories:
  - Transnistria Governorate (implemented in 1941, never fully annexed)
- Projected Italian administrative divisions in occupied eastern territories:
  - Italian Protectorate of Georgia.

== Operational plans of Japan and Thailand ==
the largest expansion of the Japanese Empire in the summer of 1942.

Listed below are operations and invasion plans of the Japanese Empire from 1929 to 1942:

=== 1929–1940 ===
- Hokushin-ron (plans for a potential attack on the Soviet Union and the occupation of territories from Manchuria to Central Siberia, making a territorial expansion to the north).
- Nanshin-ron (plans for a potential attack in the Pacific Islands and then in Southeast Asia, making a territorial expansion to the south).
- Attempts to take the China Far East Railway
- Manchurian Invasion to conquer Northeast China, Mukden Incident
- Attempts to attack in Shanghai, January 28 Incident
- Attempts to invade the Chinese in Hebei province, Operation Nekka
- Attempts to invade Mongolia, Actions in Inner Mongolia (1933–1936)
- Attempts to invade the Chinese in Chahar province, Suiyuan Campaign (1936)
- Invasion into China (the "Marco Polo Bridge incident"), Second Sino-Japanese War
- Occupation of some Chinese East coastal provinces, Amoy Operation, Canton Operation, Hainan Island Operation, Swatow Operation, South Guangxi Operation
- Battles with Soviets in the Changkufeng/Khasan area, Battle of Lake Khasan
- Battles with Soviets and Mongols in Nomonhan Soviet-Japanese Border War (1939)
- Occupation of North Indochina, Indochina Expedition
- Franco-Thai War
  - Thailand invasion of Laos and Cambodia

=== 1941–1943 ===
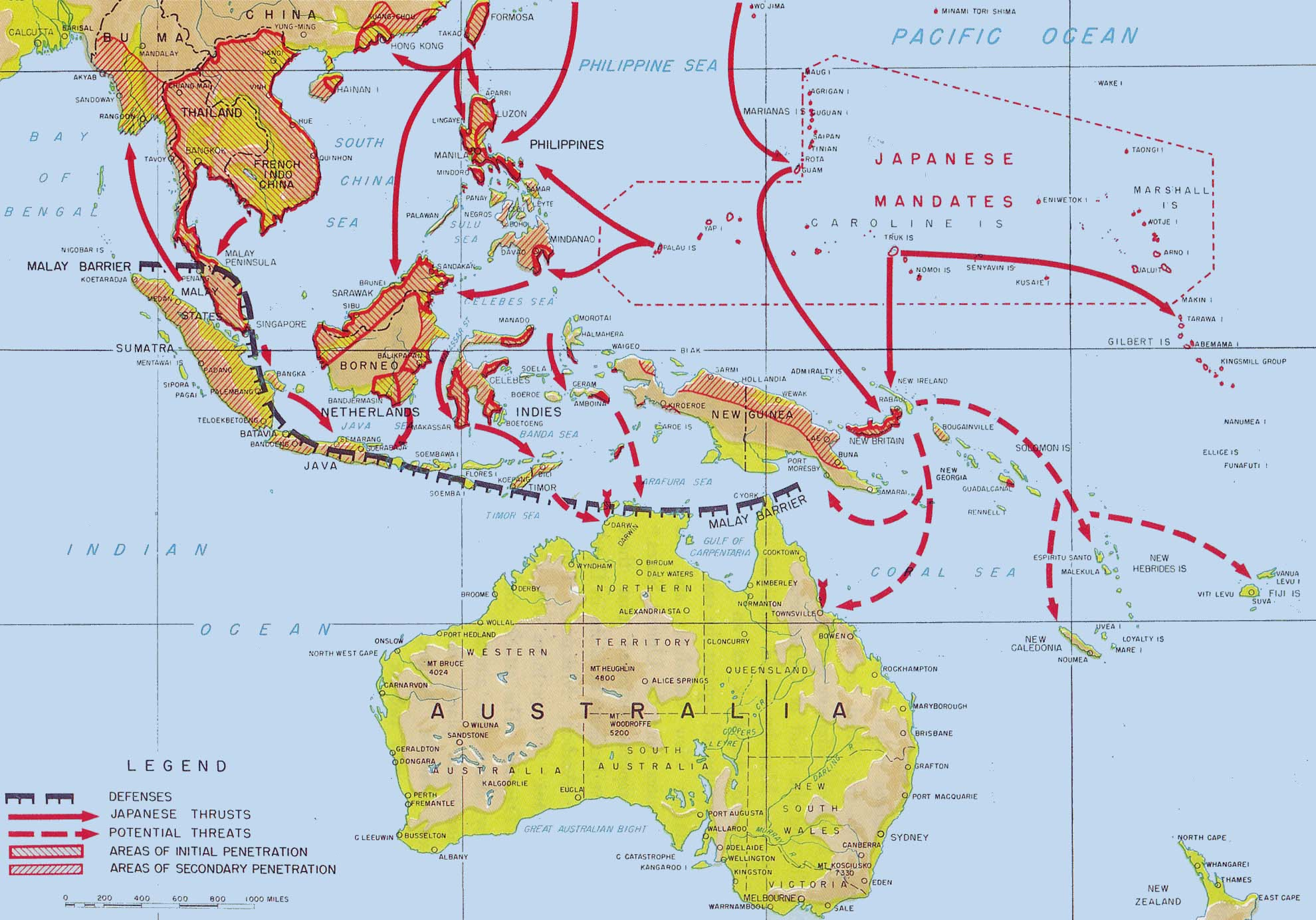
Planned Japanese invasions to the South

Planned Japanese invasions to the North

- Advances in the China Mainland, Second Sino-Japanese War
- Operation AI (Pearl Harbor strike)
  - Operation K
- Operation A (Japanese Invasion of South-East Asia in 1941)
  - Operation E "Malayan" (Invasion of British Malaya)
  - Operation B (Invasion of Borneo)
  - Operation C (Invasion of Hong Kong)
  - Operation M (Invasion of the Philippines)
  - Operation H (Invasion of the Dutch Indies ([now Indonesia])
  - Operation G (Invasion of Guam and Wake Island)
  - Operation R "Bismarck" (Invasion of New Guinea/Solomons)
- Control of all of Indochina
  - Invasion of Thailand
  - Operation B (Japanese Invasion of Burma)
- Christmas Island invasion
- Projected Invasion to Cocos (Keeling) Islands
- Japanese Invasion of the Gilbert Islands
- Japanese Invasion of Nauru and Ocean island
- Operation AL (Invasion of Aleutian Islands on Alaska)
- Operation C Planned occupation of Ceylon ("Invasion of Ceylon")
- Operation D (Invasion of Andaman and Nicobar Islands)
- Operation Western Asia "Kuroshima Strategy": (Attempted Japanese major offensive in the Indian Ocean to made an Axis link-up in the Middle East coast (Persian Gulf and Red Sea) with German Operation Orient. Cancelled due to logistical problems and preference over an invasion to Polynesia.)
- Japanese raid on Madagascar
  - Planned invasion of the island of Madagascar
- Operation H (Invasion of Celebes, Ambon and Timor in Indonesia and East Timor)
  - Battle of Timor
- Operation J (Invasion of Java in Indonesia)
- Operation Ka (Invasion of Guadalcanal on Solomon Islands)
- Operation L, Operation T (Invasion of Sumatra in Indonesia)
- Capture of the Attu/Kiska islands (alternative operation together with the Midway operation)
- Operation MI (Intent for Hawaii Invasion (Battle of Midway))
- Operation FS (Planned conquest of Fiji, American Samoa, Samoa, and New Caledonia on July–August 1942 to cut communications between Australia and the US Cancelled due to defeat at the Battle of Midway)
- Operation Mo, Operation R, Operation SR (Invasion of New Guinea)
- Operation RY (Invasion of Nauru)
- Kantokuen (Renewed plans for an expansion to Siberia and Central Asia. Attempts to invade the Russian Far East, Eastern Siberia and Outer Mongolia)
- Western China invasion (Szechwan invasion or "Operation 5")
- Eastern China invasion (Operation Ichi-Go)
- Operation Fu-Go (Planned bombing of the US)
- Operation Fu-Go (Attack on Burma to precede an Indian Invasion on Operation U-Go)
- Strikes at Imphal and Kohima strikes ("Operation U-Go") (attempts to India Invasion,"21 Operation")
- Planned total conquest of all New Guinea and Solomon Islands
- Operation Bright Moon (Japanese invasion of French Indochina)
- Extension of south square of defensive perimeter: (Melanesia/Polynesia Areas)
  - Santa Cruz Island
  - New Hebrides
  - New Caledonia/Loyalty archipelago
  - Fiji
  - Samoa
  - Tuvalu
  - Tokelau
  - Tonga
- Rejected proposal to invade Australia
- Planned invasion of New Zealand
- Planned invasion of Panama.
- Projected Japanese administrative divisions in occupied Asian and Pacific territories:
  - Greater East Asia Co-Prosperity Sphere
    - Thailand Protectorate (annexed Saharat Thai Doem from Burma, Sirat Malai from Malaysia, Saiburi from Kedah State, Lan Chang Province from Laos, Nakhon Champassak Province from Laos and Cambodia, Phra Tabong Province from Cambodia and Phibunsongkhram Province from Cambodia)

== See also ==
- Erich Raeder during World War II
- Attacks on United States territory in North America during World War II
- List of World War II military operations
- Plan Kathleen
- Septemberprogramm
