= Operation Orient =

World War II operation plan

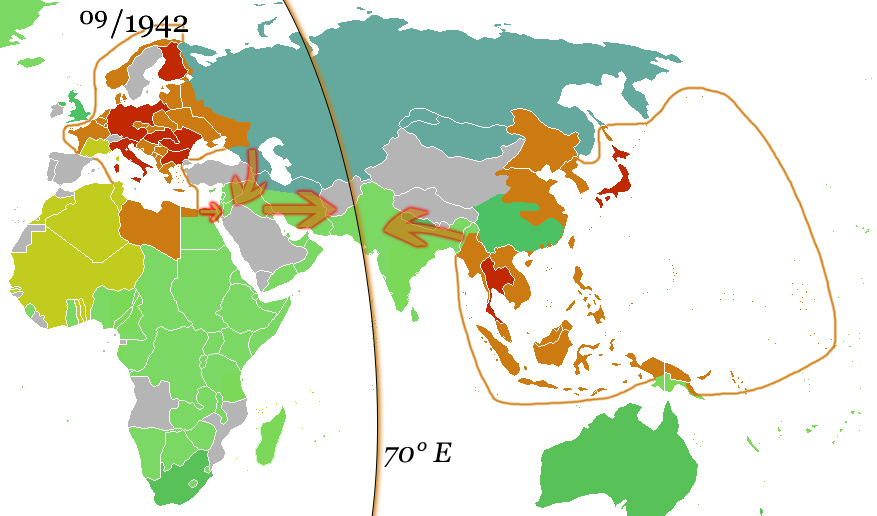
German troops were to advance through southern Russia and Africa, and Japanese troops would advance through India and ultimately link up near the proposed demarcation line at 70° E although it was never specified.

Operation Orient (German: Fall Orient) was the code name given to the operation that envisioned Nazi Germany linking up with the Empire of Japan mainly through the Middle East. Not to be confused with the North African campaign, which was highlighted in Führer-Directive Nr. 32 and gave large priority to capturing Tobruk and ultimately securing North Africa.

Operation Orient focused on securing the Middle East and its oil fields and linking up with Japanese forces after the defeat of the Soviet Union, while also was projected an invasion and possible conquest of British India, collapsing the British Empire.

The operation was planned since February 17 of 1941 by order of Hitler to the Oberkommando der Wehrmacht, having the official codename of "OKW/WEStb/L No. 44180/41 gk".

The operation was to be initiated after Germany had captured the Caucasus, secured the territories in North Africa, and finally overcome resistance by the Soviets. German armies would launch attacks from Libya through Egypt and from Bulgaria through Turkey, conquering British Palestine and occupying French Syria-Lebanon. These armies would then link up in Middle East and then march through Iran and Iraq as an assembled force finally convening in India on the 70th meridian east, where they would seal their final victory over Britain.

Due to Operation Barbarossa, all the Axis planned offensives against British Empire were suspended. Furthermore, the defeats at the Stalingrad and the El Alamein in late 1942 and early 1943 cancelled the planned operation.

== See also ==
- Axis powers negotiations on the division of Asia
- Case Blue
- Erich Raeder's "Mediterranean plan"
- Greater East Asia Co-Prosperity Sphere
