= Erich Raeder during World War II =

Erich Raeder's career during the Second World War

Erich Johann Albert Raeder (24 April 1876 – 6 November 1960) was a naval leader in Germany who played a major role in the naval history of World War II. Raeder attained the highest possible naval rank, Großadmiral (Grand Admiral), in 1939 and thus became the first person to hold that rank since Henning von Holtzendorff. Raeder led the Kriegsmarine (German: War Navy) for the first half of the war. He resigned in 1943 and was replaced by Karl Dönitz. Raeder was sentenced to life in prison at the Nuremberg Trials but was released early because of failing health.

Raeder is also well known for dismissing Reinhard Heydrich from the Reichsmarine in April 1931 for "conduct unbecoming to an officer and a gentleman".

This article covers Raeder's activities during World War II.

== Beginning of the war: Raeder's political-naval plan ==
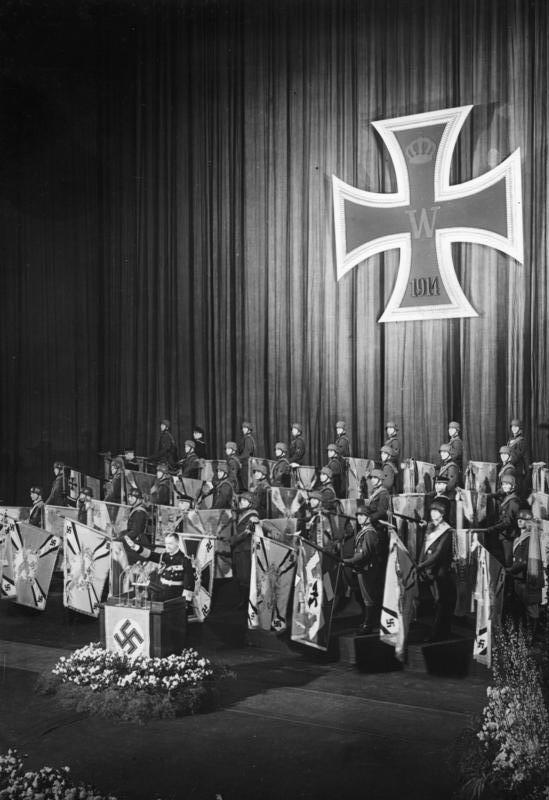
Erich Raeder offers a National Socialist salute in 1939 in Berlin.

When Britain and France declared war on Germany on 3 September 1939, Raeder was shocked and shattered by the outbreak of a general war that for the Kriegsmarine was at least five years too early. He wrote in the Seekriegsleitung war diary on 3 September 1939:

"Today the war against England and France, which the Führer had previously assured us we would not have to confront until 1944 and which he believed he could avoid up until the very last minute, began ...

As far as the Kriegsmarine is concerned, it is obvious that it is not remotely ready for the titanic struggle against England. To be sure, the brief period of time that has elapsed since the Agreement of 1935 has witnessed the creation of a well-trained and well-conceived force of U-boats, of which approximately twenty-six are currently ready for Atlantic operations, but these boats are still far too few to exert a decisive influence upon the war. The surface forces, moreover, are so weak and so few in numbers vis-à-vis the British fleet that the only course open to them-presupposing their active employment-is to show that they know how to die gallantly and thereby to create the basis for an eventual rebirth in the future".

Because the great fleet envisioned in Plan Z existed only in blueprints or had just begun to be built, Raeder, as had Tirpitz in 1914, was forced to abandon his pre-war plans for a great naval battle in the North Sea but instead embraced the guerre de course strategy that he had previously opposed. The disparity in size between the Royal Navy and the Kriegsmarine meant the great Entscheidungsschlacht in the Mahan-Tirpitz mold, which Raeder planned before the war, would end only in the destruction of the German force. Raeder's strategy, which was a modified version of the "double pole strategy" that he had devised before the war, called for the Panzerschiffe, auxiliary cruisers and submarines to attack British merchantmen all over the world to force the Royal Navy to divert its strength; meanwhile, the main surface ships would make frequent raids into the North Sea and so would gradually reduce the Royal Navy's strength. Raeder had great hopes for the auxiliary cruisers, which he sent to the Pacific, Indian and South Atlantic Oceans to tie down British warships all over the globe. To get around the problem of the lack of bases outside Germany and the shortage of Dithmarschen-class ships, Raeder had the Foreign Office in late 1939 negotiate secret agreements with Japan, Spain and the Soviet Union to allow German ships and submarines to use the ports of those nations to resupply, refuel and rearm. The shortage of surface vessels made Raeder's strategy very much a guerre de course strategy. He reluctantly followed it because the U-boats were the only offensive weapons at his disposal. Raeder's strategy was as much political as it was naval. Having spent the last six years by championing to Hitler sea power as the only way in which Germany could become a world power, Raeder was anxious that the Kriegsmarine be seen as doing more than its share of the fighting to ensure that Hitler would reward it by not cutting its budget after the war. Raeder was obsessed with the fear that "the war would end before the heavy units had been engaged" and that the sailors would "fail" in their duty to the fatherland "due to inactivity", the last being a veiled reference to the mutiny of 1918. In a message sent to all officers in June 1940, Raeder exclaimed:

"The great aim of the Führer has set forth for the German nation requires the utmost exertion in all places ... A navy which undertakes daring actions against the enemy and suffers losses through this will be reborn on an even larger scale. If it has not fought this action, then its existence will be threatened after the war".

As part of the "double pole strategy", mines were laid off the coast of Britain, and submarines and merchant raiders were sent out to the Atlantic. In the first days of the war, submarines were ordered not to practice unrestricted submarine warfare, as Hitler hoped that Britain and France would make peace after the conquest of Poland, and he feared that too many "incidents" at sea involving neutral shipping might bring the United States to the war, as had occurred in 1917. In support of Hitler's diplomatic strategy, Raeder ordered the skipper of the submarine that sank Athenia to falsify the logbook to support the German claim that the sinking of Athenia on 3 September 1939 had been a British provocation intended to fool the United States into declaring war on Germany. A major factor that assisted the war of the Kriegsmarine on British commerence was that the B-Dienst, as the German naval intelligence was known, had broken many of the British codes before the war.

In September 1939, Raeder further concentrated power in his hands by creating two Naval Group Commands, (Naval Command West and Naval Command East) to operate between the fleet commands and the naval headquarters in Berlin. The Canadian historian Holger Herwig argued that Raeder wanted a splinted command structure to increase his power, and adding an extra layer of bureaucracy was unhelpful to efficiency. In the same way, Raeder always refused to appoint a flag officer with command experience to act as the liaison with the OKW for fear that such an officer might be a threat to his power. As much as possible, Raeder tried to avoid co-operation with the army and the Luftwaffe and so Germany never had a joint chiefs of staff or anything like it during the war to prepare a coordinated strategy.

Like Hitler, Raeder viewed Britain, rather than France, as the main opponent, and accordingly wanted to focus on defeating the former first. A major problem for the Kriegsmarine was that as in World War I, it was difficult to attack the shipping in the Western Approaches to the British Isles from the North Sea from which it was likewise difficult to break out because of the British blockade. Raeder at first wanted an offensive to defeat France to use the ports on the French Atlantic coast and attack shipping in the Western Approaches, but he was informed by General Franz Halder of the Army General Staff that the army's current plans for a western offensive called for the army to seize northern France and the Low Countries, which would be used as a basis for a final offensive to defeat France sometime in 1942. In the interim, the areas seized would be used as the basis for launching air attacks on Britain. The Manstein Plan for a swift victory over France was not adopted until February 1940.

Learning of the Army's western offensive plans in September 1939 led Raeder to turn his thoughts towards Norway. At a meeting on 10 October 1939, Raeder pressed Hitler for an invasion of Norway, unrestricted submarine warfare and a declaration of war on the United States if too many "incidents" involving the sinking of neutral ships led to American support of the Allies.

The American historian Gerhard Weinberg wrote that Raeder was repeating "... the German navy leadership's argument of 1916 unaffected by the experience of 1917-18". Hitler gave his approval for unrestricted submarine warfare but also stressed to Raeder that he did not yet want the United States in the war.

Reflecting his concern with the political aspects of his plan. He wanted to gain enough glory at sea to win post-war budget battles and was furious with the outcome of the Battle of the River Plate. The captain of Admiral Graf Spee, Hans Langsdorff, believing that his damaged ship was faced with a superior British force, chose to scuttle his ship to spare the lives of his men. Both Hitler and Raeder believed that Langsdorff should have fought the British and gone down fighting, even if it meant the deaths of most or all of his crew. Raeder, knowing that Hitler was very displeased with the Kriegsmarine as a result of the River Plate, issued orders that naval commanders were no longer to concern themselves with the lives of their crews but were to go down fighting. Raeder's order of 22 December 1939 was intended to avoid a repeat of the scuttling of Admiral Graf Spee and read:

"The German warship and her crew are to fight with their strength to the last shell, until they win or they go down with their flag flying. Once engaged, the battle is to be fought to the finish."

After the Battle of the River Plate, the Flottenchef Admiral Hermann Boehm was made the scapegoat for the scuttling of Admiral Graf Spee and was sacked by Raeder.

Raeder's deputy, Admiral Rolf Carls, wrote with pride in his diary in October 1941 that "all our forces have been deployed so often and so recklessly that never can the charge of tepidity be levelled against us". Admiral Wilhelm Marschall after the war would call Raeder's strategy "wishful and prestige thinking, fateful overestimation of Germany's political and military possibilities, unfounded underestimation of the enemy England, and nonsensical insistence upon operational thoughts tied to the Z Plan" and a naval strategy based upon "phantasy, prestige-seeking and playing vabanque".

== Operation Weserübung: invasion of Scandinavia ==
Raeder was promoted to Großadmiral (Grand Admiral) in 1939, the first to hold that rank since Alfred von Tirpitz. In September 1939, Admiral Rolf Carls started sending Raeder memos about the need to seize Norway as the best way of breaking the British blockade. On 3 October 1939, Raeder at a meeting of the Naval War Staff decided to ask Foreign Minister Joachim von Ribbentrop if it would possible to gain "bases in Norway under the combined pressure of Russia and Germany". In October 1939, Raeder started strongly pushing for an invasion of Norway. Raeder was interested primarily in using Norway as a base to allow the Kriegsmarine to attack the North Atlantic sea lanes to Britain. Raeder first raised the subject of invading Norway during a meeting with Hitler on 10 October 1939 and argued that naval bases in Norway would allow the Kriegsmarine to avoid the North Sea and thus strangle Britain better. The desire to use Norway as a base for naval attacks on Britain was the primary reason that motivated Raeder to advocate attacking Norway, and it was only in early 1940 that Raeder first mentioned protecting the sea lanes that allowed Swedish iron ore to reach Germany as a secondary reason to occupy Norway. During the same meeting on 10 October 1939, Raeder stated his belief that the more ruthless the war was at sea, the sooner victory would come. The American historian Gerhard Weinberg wrote about Raeder's role in invading Norway:

"Inside the German government during the war, Raeder always called attention to his own role in pushing the invasion of Norway; after the war, he invariably blamed it on the British."

Impressed by Raeder's arguments, Hitler ordered the naval general staff to start planning for an invasion of Norway in October 1939. During the planning stages in the winter of 1939–1940, Raeder stressed that he did not want to see a temporary wartime occupation of Norway, but he rather wanted to see Norway annexed to Germany. The two men who pushed most strongly for an invasion of Scandinavia in 1939 and 1940 were Alfred Rosenberg, the Nazi Party's "official philosopher", and Raeder, both of whom had difficulty at first in convincing Hitler of the value of such a move. The British historian Sir John Wheeler-Bennett wrote Weserübung was an "adventure that did not originate with Hitler. It was the brain-child of the joint genius of Grand-Admiral Raeder and Alfred Rosenberg". William L. Shirer called Weserübung the work of "an ambitious admiral and a muddled Nazi party hack". In December 1939, Raeder befriended Vidkun Quisling, whose claims that most Norwegians were National Socialists and would welcome a German invasion were used by Reader to support the planned attack. Raeder had been introduced to Quisling by Rosenberg. On 11 December 1939, Raeder reported to Hitler that Quisling had told him during a meeting earlier that day:

"... a British landing is planned in the vicinity of Stavanger and Christiansand is proposed as a possible British base. The present Norwegian government as well as the Parliament and the whole foreign policy are controlled by the well-known Jew, Hambro [ Carl Hambro, the leader of the Norwegian Conservatives and president of the Stortling], a great friend of Hore-Belisha ... The dangers to Germany arising from a British occupation were depicted in great detail ..."

Quisling wanted to stage a coup d'état to establish a fascist regime in Norway that would be headed by himself, and despite his claims that most Norwegians supported his Nasjonal Samling, he claimed that his own people could not carry out the coup themselves without German military support. On 12 December 1939, Raeder told Hitler, Wilhelm Keitel and Alfred Jodl of the OKW that Quisling had made "a reliable impression" on him, and he repeated Quisling's arguments of the previous day to explain why Norway needed to be invaded. At the same time in early 1940, as plans for invading Norway were being discussed, Hitler had finally decided upon a plan for the invasion of France. The prospect of seizing bases in France, which were regarded as offering better access to the North Atlantic than Norway, caused many Naval Staff officers to abandon their support for Weserübung. On 13 January 1940, the Operations Division of the Kriegsmarine told Raeder that it did not believe that Britain was planning on seizing Norway, and any German move into Norway would be "... a dangerous undertaking" best avoided if possible". The American historians Williamson Murray and Alan Millet wrote about Raeder's thinking about Norway:

"... since fall 1939, Admiral Raeder had advocated an aggressive policy toward Scandinavia to protect ore shipments and to establish naval bases in the area. However, Raeder was, as usual, not taking the long view. The western campaign, if successful, would provide Germany with the ore fields of north-eastern France, as well as a more favorable geographic position, without putting Germany's surface fleet at risk. Moreover, Raeder failed to take into account the possibility that in the long run Norway's occupation might represent a burden to Germany out of all proportion to its strategic advantages".

For a short period of time in early January 1940, the German Naval Staff managed to convince Raeder that the "'best' solution was preservation of the status quo". In late January 1940, Hitler ordered planning to be resumed for an invasion of Norway. The Chief of the Army General Staff, General Franz Halder, took the view that Weserübung was far too risky an operation and excluded the army from the planning of the operation. Halder believed that Weserübung would fail, did not want to associate himself with failure and preferred Raeder to take the entire blame when his "lunatic" plans to invade Scandinavia failed. Furthermore, Halder argued that Raeder had exaggerated the threat by posed by the Allies mining the Norwegian Leads by arguing that the Baltic ice would melt in late April, and because of the 1939 non-aggression pact of 1939, Germany could always import iron from the Soviet Union to make up for any shortfall in Swedish iron imports. As a result of Halder's opposition to Weserübung, the operation was planned by the OKM and the OKW without no input from the OKH.

On 1 March 1940, Hitler approved Operation Weserübung, the plan to invade Norway and Denmark. It was only on 2 March 1940 that Hermann Göring first learned of Weserübung, and he expressed considerable fury about being excluded from the planning by Raeder and that the (Luftwaffe units that were assigned to the operation were to serve under the command of Army General Nikolaus von Falkenhorst. Because of Göring's objections to Weserübung, Hitler had to call a conference on 5 March 1940 to sort out the jurisdictional dispute, which ended with essentially reaffirming the operation with some minor concessions for Göring's bruised ego.

Norway was vital to Germany as a transport route for iron ore from Sweden, a supply that Britain was determined to stop. The British adopted a plan to go through Norway and occupy cities in Sweden. An Allied invasion was ordered on 12 March, and the Germans intercepted radio traffic setting 14 March as the deadline for preparation. Peace in Finland interrupted the Allied plans, but Hitler became convinced that the Allies would try again and became more convinced of the value of Weserübung. On 13 March 1940, Jodl wrote in his diary that Hitler was "still looking for some justification" for Weserübung after it became clear that the Allies would not move into Scandinavia. At a meeting with Hitler on 26 March, Raeder stated he still believed in Weserübung and wished for it to be started as soon as possible. Weinberg wrote that in late Marc to -early April 1940, "Raeder been especially insistent that the Germans invade Norway after it became certain that the British were not going to do so".

At a conference on 2 April 1940 attended by Hitler, Raeder, Göring and Falkenhorst it was decided that Weserübung should begin at 5: 15 a.m. on 9 April 1940. The new Allied plans were Wilfred and Plan R 4 to mine the Norwegian Leads to stop Swedish iron shipments from Narvik to Germany. The mines were laid on 8 April, and the German ships were already advancing up the Norwegian coast.

The British historian Sir John Wheeler-Bennett wrote, "Lunatic in conception, the Scandinavian expedition may have been from a rigidly military professional point of view, but it did not fail. It succeeded beyond even the hopes of its progenitors". Weserübung was successful but proved to be a costly operation for the Kriegsmarine with almost the entire German surface fleet either sunk or badly damaged. After Weserübung, the Kriegsmarine had only one heavy cruiser, two light cruisers and four destroyers available for operations. Since the victory over France provided the Kriegsmarine with the better placed French ports on the Atlantic and the iron fields of Lorraine, Weserübung proved to be unnecessary.

Hitler told Raeder that he was impressed with how the Kriegsmarine had fought in Norway, and Raeder called it "the operation which will remain the feat of arms by the Kriegsmarine in this war". Raeder admitted in the Seekriegsleitung war diary, "The operation really breaks all the rules of naval warfare theory", which the Canadian historian Holger Herwig wrote strongly suggests that Raeder's real reason for Weserübung was his desire to win the Kriegsmarine glory in the war as part of an effort to compete with the army and air force for funding. In his report to Hitler about Weserübung, Raeder claimed that the success of the operation was "undoubtedly largely" the work of the capital ships and argued that the campaign in Norway had "amply confirmed the soundness" (emphasis in the original) of the construction policies of the 1930s, which had favoured capital ships over U-boats and carriers. Admiral Wilhelm Marschall reported Raeder as saying during the campaign in Norway:

"It doesn't matter if a battleship is lost. It is necessary that the battleship fight, even if it should be destroyed ... If there is no battle, it will be said that the battleships are useless and superfluous".

The destruction of much of the Kriegsmarine surface forces in the Norwegian campaign forced Raeder to rely even more on the U-boats to wage a guerre de course against British shipping. In late May 1940, Raeder ordered Scharnhorst and Gneisenau into action off Norway's North Cape. Weinberg wrote about the North Cape raid:

"There were, furthermore, increased by the extraordinary reaction of the German naval command to the signs of victory in the West as well as in Norway. The evidence suggests that Raeder completely lost his head over what he, like so many Germans, saw as the prospect of imminent victory in the whole war. Forgetting his and the navy's own prior emphasis on the French ports as the best base for Atlantic operations, and fearful that the war might end before he could demonstrate to Hitler's satisfaction the great value of a battleship navy, he ordered the two available battleships into operations off the Norwegian coasts in late May and June 1940. Both the Scharnhorst (which had only recently repaired from earlier damage in the Norwegian operation) and Gneisenau were torpedoed by British submarines in these prestige manoeuvres. They would not be ready for operations in the Atlantic again until late December. In the process another German admiral was canned by Raeder, and his successor was covered with reproaches".

An even harsher assessment of Raeder's decision to send Scharnhorst and Gneisenau off the North Cape came from Murray and Millet, who wrote:

"The Seekriegsleitung... had lost none of its ability to confuse strategy with bureaucratic interest. In late May, worried that German successes in France and Norway might bring the war to an end before his battle cruisers saw action, Raeder committed the battle cruisers Scharnhorst and Gneisenau to a raid off Norway's North Cape. The naval staff hoped to gain a success to influence postwar budget debates ... Since Raeder had already discussed with Hitler on 20 May the possibility of invading Britain, such a waste of German naval strength off the North Cape counts as one of the most egregious naval misjudgements of the war."

Before sending Admiral Wilhelm Marschall out in Operation Juno, Raeder had told him: "We must engage the enemy in battle, even if this should cost us one of the battleships. If they are not deployed, we will receive no more in the future". Marschall was enraged that Raeder sent him out on the North Cape raid without air cover or a screening force of U-boats, without informing him of the orders that had been given to U-boats operating in the area, and without plans for resupply.

April to June 1940 was one of the most stressful periods of the war for Raeder with operations involving the entire fleet in Norway, the French campaign and Raeder's obsessive fear that the army and the Luftwaffe might win the war without the Kriegsmarine. That led to act in a manner that has been described as "irrational".

Admiral Conrad Patzig commented about Raeder in early 1940:

"Raeder is strongly influenced by his surroundings and exceptional circumstances and under stress is impulsive and unpredictable if his pride and vanity are involved".

Raeder's great fear was that after France was defeated, then Britain might sue for peace, in which case the Army and the Luftwaffe would have won the war without the Navy. During the North Cape raid, Scharnhorst and Gneisenau sank the British carrier HMS Glorious and two destroyers, but the damage that put those ships out of action for six months when they were needed for a possible invasion of Britain easily outweighed the loss of Glorious. After the North Cape raid, Raeder blamed Marschall for the damage that Scharnorst and Gneisenau had endured, claimed that Marschall had failed to understand his orders for Operation Juno properly, and sacked him.

Juno ended Marschall's career as Flottenchef, which suggests that it was privately seen as a failure, despite public claims of it being a victory.

== "World Power Status": Dreams of empire ==
On 20 June 1940, Raeder sent a memo to Hitler that called for Germany to take over the entire French fleet and the French bases on the Atlantic coast and in Dakar. Hitler overruled him by arguing that such harsh terms were bound to be rejected by the French and that the French fleet would sail over to Britain to continue the struggle if it was confronted by such a demand. As a result of the armistice of 21 June 1940, the Kriegsmarine was allowed to take over only the French Navy's bases on the Atlantic coast. The use of the French Atlantic ports, especially Lorient, gave U-boats direct access to the Western approaches to the British Isles and were a great advantage to the U-boats. Raeder would claim after the war that the armistice was a great "lost opportunity" for the Kriegsmarine. Because it took several years to build warships, taking over the French fleet would be Raeder's only hope to make good the heavy losses of the Kriegsmarine off Norway in 1940.

On 11 July 1940, Raeder met with Hitler and agreed that work on the H-class "super-battleships" envisioned in Plan Z of January 1939, which had been stopped at the outbreak of war in September 1939, should resume at once. Since in early July 1940, it was believed by both Hitler and Raeder that Britain would soon surrender, the decision to resume the Z Plan, which meant spending hundreds of millions of Reichsmarks building warships that would take at least five years to finish, reflected plans for an ultimate war with the United States. Along the same lines, Raeder wanted major new bases for the Kriegsmarine at Trondheim, Saint-Nazaire and Lorient and for bases at undetermined locations in the Canary Islands and in Morocco. Construction of the base at Trondheim was started and continued until March 1943. Hitler and Raeder planned to build a huge base at Trondheim, Nordstern, which was intended to be the future home of the fleet envisioned in the Z Plan, but also to turn Trondheim into a German city of a quarter-million people, which would be connected to Germany by a four-lane highway and gigantic bridges linking Scandinavia to the European mainland. In a series of reports that Raeder submitted to Hitler and had been written by himself and other senior officers starting in June 1940, he called for Germany to turn France and South Africa into protectorates and to annex Norway, Denmark, the Netherlands, Belgium, Luxembourg and all of the British, French and Belgian colonies in Sub-Saharan Africa so that Germany would become the dominant naval power in both the Atlantic and the Indian Oceans. The Reich Protectorate of Bohemia and Moravia was to be the model for the French and the South African protectorates. In addition, Raeder and other senior officers submitted memos calling for Germany to annex Shetland, Iceland, the Channel Islands, the Faeroe Islands, Greenland, the Azores, the Canary Islands, São Tomé and Príncipe, the Cape Verde Islands, Saint Helena, Ascension Island, Iran, Fernando Po, the Cocos Islands, Aden, Socotra, the Comoros, Madagascar, the Mauritius, the Seychelles, North Borneo, Ceylon (now Sri Lanka), Kuwait, the British mandates in the Near East, the Trucial States and if at all possible Egypt and the Dutch East Indies (now Indonesia). However, Raeder and other admirals such as Rolf Carls and Otto Schniewind conceded the Dutch East Indies would probably have to go to Japan and Egypt to Italy in the interests of Axis solidarity. Iran, the British Persian Gulf protectorates and North Borneo were considered important as they were rich in oil, which was to power the Weltmachtflotte (World Power Fleet) that was envisioned in the Z Plan. Reflecting his belief that Germany would soon attain the long-desired "world power status", Raeder ordered the Naval General Staff in mid-1940 to prepare for a war against Japan in the Far East. Raeder believed that once Britain was defeated, Germany would have to take on and destroy Japan to properly achieve its "world power status" because as a great sea power, Japan was bound to become an enemy of the Reich sooner or later.

Raeder's major fear in mid-1940 was that Hitler might not cripple Britain enough when the expected British surrender came but make a "compromise peace" which would allow it to keep its "great sea power". Raeder believed that if Hitler made such a mistake, a vengeful Britain would ally itself with the United States, which Raeder saw as a rival for "world mastery", and the English-speaking powers "will become that opponent with whom we will have to reckon with in the near future". Also, Raeder submitted a memo to Hitler that complained that Plan Z fleet was not large enough, and it called for an expanded Plan Z fleet of 80 battleships, 15-20 carriers, 100 heavy cruisers, 115 light cruisers, 500 U-boats and 250 destroyers. General Franz Halder, after reading some of Raeder's memos, wrote in his diary of "navalism run amuck" and commented about Raeder and other admirals: "These people dream in continents". The German historian Michael Salewski called those world power plans of the naval leadership in 1940 "the colourful dreams of a prisoner in solitary confinement".

According to one view, Raeder's insistence on Germany needing bases in or annexing the Canary Islands cost Germany the chance of bringing Spain into the war. In June 1940, the Spanish dictator, General Francisco Franco, decided to take advantage of France's defeat and Britain's widely expected defeat by entering the war for the Axis. The Germans made it clear that if Spain entered the war, Franco would have to promise at a minimum extraterritorial naval bases in Morocco and the Canary Islands to the Reich in exchange for which the Germans would reward Spain with various British and French colonies in Africa. Franco rejected the German preconditions, which he saw as interfering with Spanish sovereignty, and did not officially join the war. The importance of naval bases in the Canary Islands and Morocco to Germany is shown by the fact that the Germans passed up their best chance of bringing Spain into the war rather than give up their demands for bases in and off north-western Africa, which were intended to support the Kriegsmarine in a future war against the United States.

Raeder's self-proclaimed status as the "father" of Operation Weserübung meant that he took a special interest in Norway. Raeder had wanted Hitler to appoint Admiral Hermann Boehm to rule Norway, and he was disappointed when Hitler instead chose Josef Terboven to be the Reichkommissar for Norway in April 1940. Despite that setback, Raeder backed Boehm's efforts to give the Kriegsmarine as great as role in running Norway as possible. Raeder, Boehm and Terboven all shared the same goal of incorporating Norway into Germany. Still, Boehm, backed by Raeder, often clashed with Terboven over the correct way of ruling Norway. Raeder and Boehm believed that Terboven was too brutal, callous and tactless and that if only a more gentle policy towards the Norwegians were followed, the Norwegians could be won over and be willingly incorporated into a Greater German Reich. Raeder did not share Quisling's goal of ruling a fascist Norway by himself as a German ally as the equal of the Reich, but he chose to back Quisling in his battles against Terboven as the best way of winning the Norwegians over to the "New Order". Raeder called his friend Quisling "a very upright, trustworthy man, typical of the somewhat dour Norwegian, but intelligent", whose only flaw was his substandard German. Raeder believed that for the duration of the war, giving Quisling as much power as possible was the best way to persuade Norwegians to accept the "New Order", which in time would lead them to accept that their fate was to become part of Germany. Raeder would find that Terboven had no interest in sharing power with Quisling or anyone else.

== Operation Sea Lion and "Mediterranean plan" ==
Raeder argued strongly against Operation Sea Lion, the planned German invasion of Britain, as Weserübung had almost destroyed the German surface fleet. He felt that the war at sea could be conducted far more successfully via an indirect strategic approach by increasing the numbers of U-boats and small surface vessels in service to wage a Handelskrieg, as guerre de course is known in Germany against British shipping, which would have had the additional benefit from Raeder's viewpoint of bolstering his case for making the Kriegsmarine into the first service at the expense of the army and the Luftwaffe. By mid-1940, Raeder had come to appreciate that submarines were both cheaper and faster to build than warships. He also had doubts about Germany's ability to gain air superiority over the English Channel and the lack of regional German naval superiority. Air supremacy was a prerequisite to successfully preventing destruction of the German invasion fleet by the Royal Navy. The invasion of Britain was postponed indefinitely in September 1940 because the Luftwaffe had failed to obtain air supremacy during the Battle of Britain, and the Royal Navy had significantly greater power over the German naval forces. On 21 July 1940, Raeder first learned that Hitler was contemplating invading the Soviet Union. At the time, Raeder had no objections to the proposed invasion, other than to complain that it was likely to strengthen the budgets of the army and the Luftwaffe at the expense of the navy. The idea of a "peripheral strategy" for defeating Britain was first suggested in a memo to Raeder by Admiral Gerhard Wagner on 29 August 1940; who stated that Germany could not defeat Britain in the air or the sea, and it could instead seek victory only in the Mediterranean as a weak spot of the British Empire.

In September 1940, Raeder first presented his "Mediterranean plan" to Hitler. Raeder favoured a strategic focus on the Mediterranean Theatre, including a strong German presence in North Africa, plus an invasion of Malta and the Middle East by German, Italian, Spanish and if necessary Vichy French forces. A variation of Raeder's plan had been proposed by Hitler's top general Alfred Jodl in the June 30th memorandum "Basic Considerations for the Continuation of the War Against England" where he briefly discussed "Enlarging the war on the British periphery." Raeder believed that capturing Gibraltar and the Suez Canal would be a great blow to Britain. Afterwards, Axis forces would use the Spanish Canary Islands, the Portuguese Azores and the Cape Verde islands to launch naval and air attacks, which would destroy British commerce and knock Britain out of the war. On 6 September 1940 and again on 26 September, Raeder met with Hitler to advise the acceptance of his "Mediterranean plan". According to Raeder:

"The British have always considered the Mediterranean the pivot of their world empire ... Germany, however, must wage war against Great Britain with all the means at her disposal and without delay before the United States is able to intervene effectively.

Gibraltar must be taken. The Canary Islands must be secured by the Air Force.

The Suez Canal must be taken.

An advance from Suez through Palestine and Syria as far as Turkey is necessary. If we reach that point, Turkey will be in our power. The Russian problem will then appear in a different light ... It is doubtful whether an advance against Russia from the north will be necessary".

On 30 May 1941, Raeder strongly advocated for a major offensive against Egypt with the goal of taking the Suez. He believed that if the Suez fell, it would deal a blow that "would be more deadly to the British Empire than the capture of London!" On several occasions, he suggested that Hitler send the vaunted tank commander Erwin Rommel to Egypt. Hitler agreed with Raeder's idea of sending German forces to North Africa at their meeting of 26 September 1940, but noted that he would need Italian permission to do so, and it was only when Benito Mussolini requested German help in early 1941, the necessary Italian permission was obtained. Murray and Millet wrote that Raeder's "Mediterranean strategy" had "... more to do with inter-service rivalry than with any strategic conception".

When Raeder first raised the "Mediterranean plan" on 6 September 1940, Hitler mentioned that he was also considering an attack on the Soviet Union, and Raeder did not object, and it was only at the second meeting, on 26 September 1940, that Raeder first argued for giving primacy to the "Mediterranean plan" over an invasion of Russia. Raeder's change of mind about the operation that should be given primacy was mostly because of signs of increased American support for Britain such as the Destroyers for Bases Agreement of 2 September 1940, the Anglo-Free French attack on Dakar and the defection of several French colonies in Africa from Vichy to the Gaullists. Raeder argued that it was quite possible that the United States might intervene in the near future, which led him to argue that Britain must be defeated in the winter of 1940–1941 before America could enter the war, and the signs that Vichy was losing its control over the French colonial empire meant that the Allied cause was growing stronger in resource-rich Africa. Raeder argued that it was now time to sign a peace treaty that would make Vichy France into a full ally and claimed that Vichy French forces could take the important British naval base at Freetown and that by ceasing to treat France as a conquered country, Germany would be allowed to gain all of the resources of the French colonial empire and its fleet.

A major historiographical debate concerns the question of whether Hitler tried to implement the "Mediterranean strategy" in late 1940. Globalist historians, who believe Hitler had a master plan for conquering the world, such as Andreas Hillgruber, Klaus Hildebrand and Gerhard Weinberg have argued that Hitler was never seriously interested in the "Mediterranean plan", his main priority was always the invasion of the Soviet Union for which he ordered planning to start in July 1940 and Hitler's interest in the "Mediterranean plan" in late 1940 was only half-hearted at best. Other historians, such as the German historian Wolfgang Michalka, the Anglo-German historian H.W Koch and the Israeli historian Martin van Creveld, have contended that Hitler's efforts to form an anti-British Eurasian "continental bloc" that was to include the Soviet Union in late 1940 as a diplomatic prelude to the "Mediterranean plan" were sincere, Hitler's first priority until December 1940 was defeating Britain and it was only when Hitler gave his approval to Operation Barbarossa that he finally lost interest in the "Mediterranean strategy". The British historian Aristotle Kallis wrote that the best evidence suggests that in late 1940, Hitler was serious about carrying out Raeder's "Mediterranean plan", but only within certain strict limits and conditions, and he saw it as part of the preparations for Barbarossa by defeating Britain first. Kallis argued that diplomatic issues prevented Hitler from executing the "Mediterranean plan" in late 1940, as he had wanted. In June 1940, an agreement had assigned the Mediterranean as Italy's sphere of influence, and until Mussolini requested German help in January 1941, German troops could not be sent to North Africa. Operation Felix, the plan for taking Gibraltar, became stillborn, as Spain remained neutral, a situation that was in large part caused by the German demand for Spain to provide Germany with naval bases in Canary Islands as the price for Gibraltar. As proof that Hitler was serious about Raeder's "Mediterranean plan" in late 1940, Kallis noted that Hitler made a major push to bring Spain into the war between September and December 1940, and on 12 November, he ordered the Army General Staff to treat planning for Operation Felix as its first priority. Franco was keen to enter the war, but the Spanish wanted major infusions of food aid to counter the anticipated effects of a British blockade, a German commitment to help modernise the Spanish military, and no German bases on their soil, conditions that Hitler refused to meet. After it became clear that Spain would not enter the war, Hitler on 18 December 1940 approved Operation Barbarossa and declared that the Wehrmacht's top priority would now be the defeat of the Soviet Union "even before the conclusion of the war against England". The German historian Gerhard Schreiber wrote that Raeder's "Mediterranean plan" was a chimera because it would have required German diplomacy to make compromises with Vichy France, Spain and Italy that Hitler had no interest in making, and without the necessary diplomatic prelude, the plan had no hope of ever being carried out. Along the same lines, the British historian Ian Kershaw wrote that Raeder's "Mediterranean plan" was impossible for two reasons. The first was that Hitler did not wish to treat Vichy France as an ally, as Raeder had advised, and the only way that he could have had the French fleet deployed against Britain was to stop treating Alsace-Lorraine as if it had been annexed to Germany, a sacrifice that Hitler was not prepared to make. Also, Vichy France did not wish to give up its empire, and both Spain and Italy desired to annex the same British and French possessions. Finally, many of the British and French possessions that both Italy and Spain wanted were coveted by the Germans. The rival imperialist agendas of Vichy, Madrid, Rome and Berlin would have required a diplomatic "grandiose fraud", which Kershaw stated was beyond even Hitler. Finally, when Mussolini finally requested German help after he had been driven out of Egypt and lost much of Libya in January 1941, Hitler had already decided upon Barbarossa, and the German forces who were sent to North Africa had the mission only to rescue the Italians, not to take Egypt, as Raeder had wanted.

Instead of the "Mediterranean plan", the German war machine was diverted to Operation Barbarossa, the German invasion of the Soviet Union, which Raeder vigorously opposed. He thought that Hitler was too fixated on wiping out the Soviet regime to realise that a larger global strategy could easily have tipped the balance in Germany's favour. Raeder always saw Britain as the main enemy and argued that by destroying the British Empire would create the basis for a Weltreich (World Reich), which would take on the United States sometime later in the 1940s. Raeder shared Hitler's anti-communism but not to the same virulent degree, and he saw the Soviet Union as an ally, albeit a difficult one, that was and would continue to be of great assistance to the anti-British struggle. It was only after Britain and the United States were defeated that Germany should turn east against the Soviet Union. Kershaw wrote that there were two strands of German imperialism. One strand, associated with Tirpitz, Raeder and others, was focused on navalism and colonialism overseas and was very anti-British. Another stand, associated with the Nazi Party and the army, was very anti-Slavic and focused on obtaining lebensraum in Eastern Europe. The two stands of maritime and continental imperialism were not necessarily antagonistic and could co-exist. Kershaw wrote that Hitler and Raeder had the same goals but differed only about how best to achieve them. Hitler, in ordering Barbarossa, was not rejecting Raeder's "Mediterranean strategy", but was only postponing it. Hitler expected and was told by all of his generals that the Red Army was hopelessly inferior to the Wehrmacht and that it would take the German Army at most six months, more probably two to three months, to destroy the Soviets. Once Barbarossa had been completed with the destruction of the Soviet Union later in 1941, Raeder's "Mediterranean plan" would be executed in 1942, and German industry would focus on building the fleet envisioned in the Z Plan, which would, when it was complete, carry out Raeder's programme of trans-oceanic expansionism. Hitler was so confident of the success of Barbarossa that on 20 June 1941, two days before Barbarossa was to begin, he ordered that from 1 January 1942, the army was to go from first to third in regards to spending and allocation of raw materials to build up the Kriegsmarine and the Luftwaffe. The American historian Keith Bird summed up the strategic differences between Hitler and Raeder:

"Raeder's continual pressure for an intensified war with Britain and his willingness to risk war with the United States, however, conflicted with Hitler's short-term continental goals. Raeder persistently tried to influence Hitler's every decision in favour of preparing the foundations for the next step of the navy's ambitions. Above all, he wanted to ensure that the navy would have a pre-eminent role in Hitler's Weltreich and armament priorities far beyond what it could hope to achieve in this war".

Hitler saw the conquest of the Soviet Union, which was intended to give Germany Lebensraum and then control of enough of Eurasia to provide sufficient autarky to challenge the sea powers and to carry out Raeder's plans for trans-oceanic expansionism. Raeder, in contrast, preferred to focus on defeating Britain before turning east.

Raeder often disagreed with Hitler on strategy, but he was the beneficiary of huge bribes. In April 1941, Raeder accepted a bribe of 250,000 Reichsmark from Hitler as a reward for loyalty to the Nazi regime. Another bribe that Raeder accepted was a gift of a painting worth 38,000 Reichsmark. In general, officers who were in some way critical of Hitler's military, if not necessarily political leadership, such as Field Marshal Wilhelm Ritter von Leeb, Field Marshal Gerd von Rundstedt and Admiral Raeder, received and accepted larger bribes than officers who were well known to be convinced National Socialists, such as General Walter Model, Admiral Karl Dönitz and Field Marshal Ferdinand Schörner. The success of Hitler's bribery system backfired when some officers, who had proven themselves especially greedy, such as Guderian and Raeder, came to be regarded by Hitler as a serious annoyance because of their endless demands for more money and more free land for their estates. Raeder's demanded in 1942 that on top of his lifetime exemption from paying income taxes, Hitler should also cancel out taxes on the interest he earned from his 4,000-Reichsmark-per-month payment from Konto 5, which was viewed as outrageous greed.

== 1941: Going to war against America ==
In January 1941, Raeder launched the successful Operation Berlin in which Gneisenau and Scharnhorst were sent out on a raid into the North Atlantic that lasted until March 1941. On 4 February 1941, Raeder sent Hitler a memo suggesting that the continual neutrality of the United States was not in the best interests of the Reich and suggested that having it as an enemy might even be "advantageous for the German war effort" if it brought Japan into the war against Britain and the United States. Hitler rejected that advice by saying that it was better at present to keep America neutral to keep it limited in how far it could support Britain. On 18 March 1941, Raeder asked Hitler to end the rules that U-boats could not fire on American warships unless they were fired upon first. He instead demanded a policy that would allow the Kriegsmarine to sink all American warships on sight. Raeder also warned Hitler that Germany needed to take over the French colonies in West Africa and that it would be "most dangerous" if the United States gained influence in French Africa. Hitler said that he needed more time to think about what Raeder had suggested.

During the same meeting, Raeder said that he wanted Japan to enter the war as soon as possible since a Japanese attack on the British base at Singapore would force the Royal Navy to deploy most of its strength to the Far East and thereby allow the Kriegsmarine to win the Battle of the Atlantic. Raeder further added that now was the best time for Japan to enter the war because with "the whole English fleet contained, the unpreparedness of the USA for war with Japan and the inferiority of the U.S. fleet compared to the Japanese". Raeder added that the fall of Singapore would "solve all the other Asiatic questions regarding the USA and England". The only problem with bringing about that scenario that Raeder mentioned was that the Japanese had informed him that they would attack Singapore only "if Germany proceeds to land in England". The British historian Ian Kershaw described Raeder as having a "trigger-happy" attitude to the United States in 1941 by always pressing Hitler to take the most extreme measures with the Americans, whom Raeder hated almost as much as he detested the British. On 22 May 1941, Hitler asked if it was possible if the Kriegsmarine could take the Azores, which Hitler wanted to use as a base for launching long-distance bombers, which would destroy the cities of the Eastern United States. Raeder was forced to report with regret that Kriegsmarine "must reject the idea of occupying the Azores" under the account of the heavy losses that had been endured in Weserübung the previous year since ships that were needed to undertake that operation were not there.

In April 1941, Raeder planned to follow up the success of Operation Berlin with Operation Rheinübung in which Gneisenau, Bismarck, Admiral Hipper and Prinz Eugen would be sent out on an extended raid into the North Atlantic under the command of Admiral Günther Lütjens. On the night of 10/11 April 1941, Gneisenau was badly damaged by a British bombing attack, which put her out of commission for months. Admiral Lütjens then advised cancelling the operation, as having one battleship with only one heavy cruiser in support operating alone in the Atlantic was too risky, but he was overruled by Raeder, who insisted on going ahead. Raeder's principal reason for going ahead with Rheinübung was his knowledge of the upcoming Operation Barbarossa in which the Kriegsmarine could only play a very small part and his desire to score a major success before Barbarossa, which might impress upon Hitler the need not to cut the budget for capital ships. Lütjens wanted Rheinübung put off until Scharnhorst had finished refitting in July 1941, but since Barbarossa was due to start on 22 June 1941, Raeder insisted for the operation to go ahead in May 1941. Rheinübung saw Bismarck sink the battlecruiser HMS Hood but ended with the sinking of Bismarck.

The loss of a modern battleship more than outweighed the loss of an old battlecruiser, and the debacle almost put an end to Raeder's strategy of using capital ships to destroy the British Merchant Marine. Murray and Millet wrote that after the loss of Bismarck "Raeder's strategy of surface raiders had largely failed". After Bismarck had been disabled by a British torpedo hit on the rudder on 26 May 1941, Raeder sent a series of radio messages to Lütjens to remind him of his "fight to the last round" order of December 1939, which Lütjens faithfully obeyed. The German historian Werner Rahn argued in Germany and the Second World War that the official history of the Wehrmacht stated that Raeder's orders to "fight to the finish" doomed most of the crew of the Bismarck to a watery grave. If Lütjens had been given the option of scuttling or surrendering the Bismarck, rather engaging in a hopeless battle, the lives of 2,200 German officers and sailors could have been saved, instead of the 110 who were saved. Raeder himself was personally pleased by the sinking of Bismarck. He felt it had won the Kriegsmarine some much needed glory on the high seas and was consistent with his goal of "full engagement" in which the Kriegsmarine capital ships were sent into action until they all were sunk to win his service glory. However, Hitler was more than annoyed at the loss of Bismarck.

The deaths of most of the crew of Bismarck did not trouble Hitler, but he complained to Raeder that building Bismarck had cost millions of Reichsmark, and it seemed like a poor investment since the ship was lost on its first voyage. Moreover, Hitler told Raeder that he believed that once the Soviet Union had been defeated later in the summer of 1941, it was quite possible that Britain would simply "collapse" as a result of that German triumph. He wanted the German fleet to be ready to take advantage of the expected "collapse", not at the bottom of the Atlantic. After the loss of Bismarck, Hitler started to curtail Raeder's freedom to plan and to launch operations on the high seas involving capital ships. Raeder's last attempt at using a capital ship as a raider occurred in June 1941, when he ordered the pocket battleship Lützow into the North Atlantic. She was badly damaged by an attack from British torpedo planes on 13 June 1941, which put her out of commission for six months.

Some naval officers then expressed the concern that the British were reading at least some of the naval codes, as the Royal Navy seemed to have a suspicious ability to know where German ships were, but Raeder dismissed those concerns. That was especially the case because in early 1941, the Royal Navy used intelligence from Ultra to sink all of the Dithmarschen ships and other supply ships that were used by the Kriegsmarine to supply U-boats and surface raiders on the high seas. The British had intended to leave two supply ships at sea to disguise the fact that they had broken the naval codes, but the remaining two supply ships were captured after chance encounters in the Atlantic. In response to protests from other senior officers that something was amiss, as had been proven by the loss of the entire supply ship network in early 1941, in mid-1941 and in mid-1942, Raeder ordered investigations into the security of German codes, but in both cases, it was concluded that the British were not reading German codes because the Enigma machine was considered to be unbreakable.

Raeder, despite Rheinübung and the damaging attack on Lützow, in July 1941 began planning for what he called "the battle of the Atlantic", a plan to send every single warship in the Kriegsmarine into the Atlantic to take on the Royal Navy in one colossal battle, which would almost certainly result in the destruction of the German force but would hopefully make the British victory a Pyrrhic one. The planning for this operation stopped in late 1941, when Hitler heard of it and vetoed the operation under the grounds that even a British Pyrrhic victory was not worth losing every single German warship.

On 20 June 1941, Raeder used an incident in which an U-boat had almost fired on an American battleship USS Texas the day before to argue that the Kriegsmarine should be given the right to fire on sight whenever American warships were encountered. Raeder told Hitler that "where the United States is concerned firm measures are always more effective than apparent yielding". Hitler gave Raeder strict orders for no "incidents" with the United States until the war against the Soviet Union was over. In July 1941, when the US Marines took over the occupation of Iceland, Raeder advised Hitler that Germany should declare war on the United States as a reply. On 9 July 1941, during a meeting with Hitler, Raeder said he had enough of the Americans, and after the latest act of American "aggression", as he called the occupation of Iceland, he demanded for Germany to declare war on the United States. Hitler rejected Raeder's advice, but Raeder spent the entire second half of 1941 persistently pressing for Germany to go to war against the United States. Hitler was sympathetic to Raeder's anti-American fulminations but said that the war against the Soviet Union had to be finished before Germany took on the United States. In September 1941, Raeder and U-boat Commander Karl Dönitz presented Hitler with plans for an all-out U-boat offensive, which was intended to destroy both the US Navy and the US Merchant Marine. Raeder took the view that because of the increasing number of naval "incidents" in the second half of 1941 between U-boats and US ships that were guarding convoys to Britain, the best thing to do was to declare war on America to end all of the restrictions on fighting the US Navy. Murray and Millet wrote that Raeder's views on the desirability of starting a war with the United States were "astonishing" because neither he nor anybody else in the Seekriegsleitung saw fit from July to December 1941 to commission studies on what would be the strategic consequences of war against America.

On 17 September 1941, Raeder told Hitler that he believed that American support was all that allowed Britain to continue the war and that the Kriegsmarine could defeat the US Navy if only Hitler gave the necessary shoot-on-sight orders. Once the Kriegsmarine had control over the Atlantic, Britain would collapse. Hitler replied that he wanted no "incidents" with the Americans, but he expected the war with the Soviet Union would be over by late September, and in mid-October,.he would decide whether to give permission to the Kriegsmarine to sink American warships, a step equivalent to declaring war on the country.

Until the war against the Soviet Union was finished, Hitler was reluctant to have a war with the United States, and insisted upon avoiding "incidents" with the US Navy as much as possible, but Raeder was all for a war against the United States. Hitler had cancelled the Z Plan again in late 1940 but ordered it restarted in mid-1941 when it seemed that the war against the Soviet Union would soon be over. He again cancelled Z Plan for the final time in late 1941. Raeder forgot to cancel a contact that he had placed with engineering firms for the engines of the first four of the planned H-class super battleships. As a result of that oversight, the Kriegsmarine had to accept and pay for in June 1944 four gigantic engines that were meant to power battleships that did not exist. From Hitler's viewpoint, it was better to wait until the Z Plan was complete before going to war on the United States. Raeder, in contrast, thought only of the "immediate operational advantages" that would accrue to Germany if the Reich went to war against the United States. On 11 December 1941, Germany declared war on the United States, which was at least in part from the pressure of Raeder, who was now very pleased. Even before the declaration of war on 11 December, Hitler had given orders to Raeder on 8 December 1941 that the Kriegsmarine could now sink on sight American warships and also those of all republics in Latin America except Argentina as well. Raeder gave orders that the Kriegsmarine was now to begin Operation Drumbeat, the plan to defeat the United States by sending "wolf-packs" of submarines off the Atlantic coast of the United States to destroy all American shipping. On 12 December, Raeder told Hitler that prospects for victory over the United States were good. He also said, "The situation in the Atlantic will be eased by Japan's successful intervention".

Continuing his analysis of the naval situation, Raeder told Hitler:

"Reports have already been received of the transfer of some [American] battleships from the Atlantic to the Pacific. It is certain that light forces, especially destroyers will be required in increased numbers in the Pacific. The need for transport ships will be very great, so that a withdrawal of American merchant ships from the Atlantic can be expected. The strain on British merchant shipping will increase ... The U.S will have to concentrate all her strength in the Pacific during the next few months. Britain will not to run any risks after her severe losses of big ships [Raeder is referring to sinkings of HMS Prince of Wales and HMS Repulse]. It is hardly likely that transport tonnage is available for such occupation tasks or bringing up supplies ... It is improbable that the enemy will give up East Asia even temporarily; by so doing Britain will endanger India very seriously, and the U.S. cannot withdraw her fleet from the Pacific as long as the Japanese fleet has the upper hand".

Much to Raeder's annoyance, Hitler followed up declaring war on the US by sending 23 U-boats to the Mediterranean to attack British shipping and another 16 to Norway to guard against a phantom British invasion, rather than focus the U-boat fleet off the Eastern United States. Because the US Navy, under the leadership of Admiral Ernest King was not ready for anti-submarine warfare, U-boat operations off the East Coast in the first half of 1942 were very successful, and only the diversion of the U-boat fleet to the Mediterranean and Norway kept them from being even more so.

The entry of the United States to the war meant the ultimate defeat of the Kriegsmarine, as the tremendous productive capacity of American industry meant that the Allies could replace every ship that was sunk by U-boats and then build some more. In 1943, American shipyards turned out enough ships to almost equal the number of all the ships that had been sunk by U-boats between 1939 and 1942.

Murray and Millet accuse Raeder and the rest of the Seekriegsleitung of wanting war on America because the United States was an "easy target" and of "taking the easiest tactical and operational path without the slightest thought to the strategic or long-range consequences".

== 1942: "Great Plan" ==
In early 1942, Raeder become involved in a scandal when it was discovered that he had been a part of group of high-ranking officials who had abused their positions to buy more groceries than the rationing permitted, but Hitler ordered the matter to be covered up. Propaganda Minister Joseph Goebbels wanted Raeder and the other high officials of the "grocery ring" like Wilhelm Keitel, Hermann Göring and Hans Lammers who had used their positions to ignore rationing when grocery shopping to be punished to let the German people know that the elite suffered like everyone else, but Hitler claimed if the German people learned of the luxurious lifestyles of the elite in the middle of a war, the effect would be fatal to morale. The men of the "grocery ring" were only warned to be more discreet in the future when they bought their groceries. Also, in January 1942, Raeder's long-running battle with Terboven over whatever Quisling should be allowed to form a government in Norway ended with Raeder seemingly gaining the upper hand. Largely by pressure from Quisling's friends Raeder, Boehm and Rosenberg, Hitler overruled Terboven and in January 1942 and allowed Quisling to form a government in Oslo. Despite the apparent triumph, Quisling in practice had little power and anyway proved himself manifestly out of his depth in attempting to run a government. Terboven continued to rule Norway and to lash out at the Kriegsmarine efforts to back Quisling.

In late 1941, Hitler ordered all capital ships of the Kriegsmarine to Norway because of his fears of a British invasion and because the sinking of the Bismarck caused it to be judged too risky to send out capital ships as raiders. Accordingly, Raeder planned the Channel Dash of February 1942, which saw Scharnhorst, Gneisenau and Prinz Eugen make the run from Brest to Wilhelmshaven and then to Norway. The concentration of the German fleet in Norway served three purposes: a threat to Anglo-American convoys carrying supplies around the North Cape to the Soviet Union, detering an Allied invasion of Norway and having a fleet in being to tie down British warships at Scapa Flow that might otherwise be deployed in the Battle of the Atlantic. The role of a fleet in being contradicted the role of using the fleet in Norway against convoys, which made the Murmansk run. Attacking Arctic convoys allowed the risk that the ships of the fleet might be sunk or damaged in the ensuring engagements, but the role of a fleet in being required the continual existence of these ships. Neither Raeder or Hitler could quite make up his minds about what the primary purpose of the German fleet in Norway, which led to much command confusion and in turn led to the ultimate defeat in the Battle of the Barents Sea.

In February 1942, Raeder presented Hitler with the "Great Plan", a grand strategic design to win the war by a series of combined operations with Japan and Italy. Essentially a rehash of the "Mediterranean plan" of 1940 with the main German blows to be focused against the British in the Middle East, the "Great Plan" of 1942 was, however, worked out in considerably more detail and called for a series of mutually-supporting attacks between Germany in the Middle East and Japan in the Indian subcontinent, which were intended to knock Britain out of the war. On the German side of things, Raeder called for Axis forces to take Malta and to drive on across the North African desert to the Suez Canal. Once that had occurred, the German and Italian forces in the Mediterranean could link up with Japanese forces in the Indian Ocean via the Red Sea, a situation that Raeder claimed would cause the collapse of the British Empire and create the preconditions for the defeat of the United States. Raeder called Erwin Rommel's Afrika Korps in effect "an organ of the Seekriegsleitung" because it would have the function of taking Egypt. Finally, for Raeder's "Great Plan" required the Kriegsmarine to take over the French fleet at Toulon to create the necessary battle fleet, which would allow the Germans to be equal partner to the Japanese and to the Italians. Operation Drumbeat, the "Second Happy Time" of the U-boats, had inflicted heavy losses on shipping off the Eastern Coast of the US in early 1942 and had followed up by another U-boat offensive in the Gulf of Mexico and the Caribbean starting in May 1942 and another one in Canadian waters in the summer of 1942. In May 1942, the Kriegsmarine sunk more tonnage in the Gulf of Mexico and the Caribbean than it had during any of the months of the "First Happy Time" of 1940. Between January and August 1942, U-boats had sunk 485 ships totalling 2, 600, 000 tons in the waters from Canada to the Caribbean and inflicted what the American historian Gerhard Weinberg called "... the most disastrous defeat ever suffered by American naval power". In addition, April 1942 saw the introduction of "milch cow" submarines, which served to supply other U-boats and thus extend the cruise time of boats in the New World. They had been ordered by Raeder in 1941 to make up for the destruction of the supply ship network by the Royal Navy in the spring of 1941. Operation Drumbeat seemed to confirm Raeder's repeated statements in 1941 that the United States was a paper tiger that the Kriegsmarine could easily defeat and so Raeder's prestige with Hitler in early 1942 was quite high. Because the Kriegsmarine had operations in the New World that were so successful, Hitler had some interest in Raeder's "Great Plan". However, objections from General Franz Halder of the Army General Staff, who accused Raeder of having no understanding of logistics, together with the fact that the Army was fully engaged on the Eastern Front, meant that Raeder's "Great Plan" in the end was ignored.

As the U-boats continued to be the arm of the Kriegsmarine to do most of the fighting, Reader was becoming increasingly overshadowed by Admiral Karl Dönitz, who made little secret of his contempt for the "battleship admiral" and started to act more and more independently, such as by dealing directly with Albert Speer in settling construction targets for the U-boats. Dönitz had little respect for "old navy" admirals like Raeder, whom he accused of being more interested in a building a great fleet after the war than in actually winning the war. By early 1942, Raeder and Dönitz were openly feuding with each other, with Dönitz mocking Raeder's obsession with "dinosaurs", as Dönitz called battleships, and Raeder complaining of Dönitz's massive ego and tendency to run the U-boat arm as it were his own private navy. Dönitz harboured enormous resentment against Raeder for starving the U-boat arm of funds before the war to concentrate on building battleships. Raeder and Dönitz constantly fought over the proper use of the U-boats: whether to win the "tonnage war" by sinking as much as tonnage as possible, as Dönitz wanted, or to win the "commerce war" by denying the Allies use of certain waterways like the North Cape route to the Soviet Union, as Raeder favoured. The dispute about the "tonnage war" and the "commerce war" reflected the differing concepts of the guerre de course and the teachings of Mahan. Dönitz, as a follower of the guerre de course theories of Théophile Aube, was interested in doing as much damage to the enemy merchant fleets as possible, but Raeder, as a follower of Mahan. was concerned about seizing and maintaining control of key waterways.

In late 1942, in an attempt to limit Dönitz's power and cut down his "vanity", Raeder took away responsibility for training U-boat crews from Dönitz but saw him ignore his orders. Dönitz informed Raeder that he would disregard that order and continue to train crews for "my" U-boats, as Dönitz rather possessively described the U-boat fleet. The authoritarian Raeder, who was not used to having his orders disobeyed, never forgave Dönitz. Raeder longed to sack Dönitz but was unwilling to do so as he felt that was nobody to replace the aggressive and fanatically-Nazi Dönitz, who knew more about submarine warfare than any other admiral in the Kriegsmarine and seemed to be on the verge of winning the Battle of the Atlantic. Despite his strong dislike of Dönitz, Raeder recognized the success of the U-boats and lobbied Hitler for more funding of submarine construction. Raeder appreciated that by 1942, the U-boats were the only means for the Kriegsmarine to play a "decisive" role in the war and defeat the nation that Raeder saw as the real enemy, Britain. By 1942, Dönitz had emerged as Hitler's favourite admiral, who would even be named by Hitler as his successor, and sacking Dönitz would probably lead Hitler to sack him in turn. Recognising Hitler's fondness for Dönitz, Raeder always took Dönitz with him, despite their mutual dislike, when he went to lobby Hitler for more naval funding since he correctly thought that Hitler was more likely to agree to a request for more money for U-boat construction from Dönitz than from himself. Hitler was won over and ordered German industry to make manufacturing submarines the second-highest priority, and it was exceeded in importance only by the need to manufacture weapons for the troops on the Eastern Front. On 28 September 1942, at a conference attended by Hitler, Raeder, Dönitz and Admiral Werner Fuchs (who was in charge of naval construction) the advantages of a new type of submarine, known as the Walter boat, which would go 20 knots underwater (three times than what current U-boats could manage), were reviewed. It was decided to build a small number of Walter boat submarines, but Dönitz successfully argued that it was better to increase production of the existing U-boat types than to switch over to using Walter boats. Only in 1943 would Dönitz change his mind about the Walter boat.

In December 1942, Raeder enforced the Commando Order by having British Royal Marines, captured after the Operation Frankton raid on a German naval base in Bordeaux, shot. In the Seekriegsleitung war diary, Raeder wrote that the executions of the Royal Marines were "an innovation in international law since the soldiers were wearing uniforms". The American historian Keith Bird wrote that Raeder seemed "uncomfortable" with the Commando Order but nonetheless enforced it. The American historian Charles Thomas wrote that Raeder's remarks about the executions in the Seekriegsleitung war diary could have been meant as some sort of ironic comment in protest of the executions, which might have reflected a guilty conscience on his part in enforcing a policy that he knew was illegal and one which might lead him to being prosecuted for war crimes if Germany lost the war.

== Building the Nazi navy: terror and propaganda ==
A harsh disciplinarian, Raeder was obsessed with the fear that the Kriegsmarine might "disgrace" itself like in the last war with the 1918 Kiel mutiny. To prevent a repetition, Raeder imposed a "ruthless discipline", which was designed to terrorise his sailors into obedience. Under the leadership of Raeder and even more so under his successor, Karl Dönitz, it was official policy for naval courts-martial to impose the death penalty as often as possible, no matter how slight the offence, so that the sailors would fear their officers more than the enemy. Historians have described Raeder as someone who "supported the Nazi regime unflinchingly and proved merciless against malingerers, deserters and those who questioned the authority of the Führer".

As a counterpart to his policy of terror, Raeder placed great emphasis on "spiritual leadership" as a war-winning factor in the Kriegsmarine, which in practice meant an intense program of propaganda. Always obsessed by the fear of another mutiny like that of 1918, Raeder believed that the correct "spiritual leadership" on the part of the officers would prevent such an occurrence. They were ordered to conduct indoctrination sessions with their sailors to remind them that they were fighting not only for Germany but also for National Socialism and Hitler. A large role was allocated to the so-called Sonderführer, reporters from the Propaganda Ministry who were commissioned into the Kriegsmarine as lieutenants or NCOs and had duties that included not only reporting for the public but also promoting National Socialist propaganda. Even more important were the Wehrbetreuungsoffizer, which from 1940 served in every vessel and with land units from the company level on up and were tasked with preventing a repeat of the 1918 mutiny by boosting morale and promoting National Socialist thinking.

In November 1941, Raeder would complain that the Kriegsmarine would fight better if only the sailors were more indoctrinated into National Socialism, which ordered his officers to do. In a speech in early January 1943, Raeder called World War II an ideological war, praised National Socialism for its "moral strength" and claimed National Socialist indoctrination was the only way for the war to be won.

Raeder went on to call for indifference to National Socialism in the Kriegsmarine to be destroyed "root and branch" and stated: "We cannot win the war against a fanatical enemy with the old principle of 'live and let live'". Raeder finally ended his speech with this statement:

"Do not think only of the present day or the present war; think instead of the millennia in which the German nation has already struggled and of the centuries that lie before us and require a wise use of all our resources from this day on ... Remember, therefore, the most important axiom in the thoughts of our Führer and Supreme Commander; it is not the individual, the family or the clan that count, but the Volk and Volk alone. That which serves it is good; that which harms it is bad. The Volk incorporates our highest goals. Its thousand-year tasks and struggles extend onto the heights from which divine providence directs all life."

With Raeder's religious feelings, in no other branch of the Wehrmacht would chaplains play such a prominent role as in the Kriegsmarine. The Navy's chief chaplain was the Lutheran Pastor Friedrich Ronneberger, an ardent Nazi Party member and a leading member of the 'German Christian' movement. It was official policy of the Wehrmacht to favour the recruitment of German Christian pastors, and those belonging to the Confessing Church were banned from becoming Wehrmacht chaplains. German Christian pastors serving as Wehrmacht chaplains preached a "manly Christianity" to Wehrmacht members that unabashedly glorified war as the only fit and proper activity for "real men".

One result of Raeder's efforts to indoctrinate the Kriegsmarine was to make a great many of his officers and men into Nazi fanatics. Royal Navy reports of captured Kriegsmarine officers and sailors often commented as one report from October 1940 noted the prisoners-of-war "were all fanatical Nazis and hated the British intensely, which had not been so evident in previous cases". The Royal Navy went on to note that based on its interrogations of Kriegsmarine prisoners-of-war that Raeder's indoctrination policy had borne fruit since the morale of the Kriegsmarine was extremely high, and most officers and sailors were very proud to fight for Führer and fatherland.
