= Case Blue =

1942 German military operation

- Part of the Eastern Front of World War II
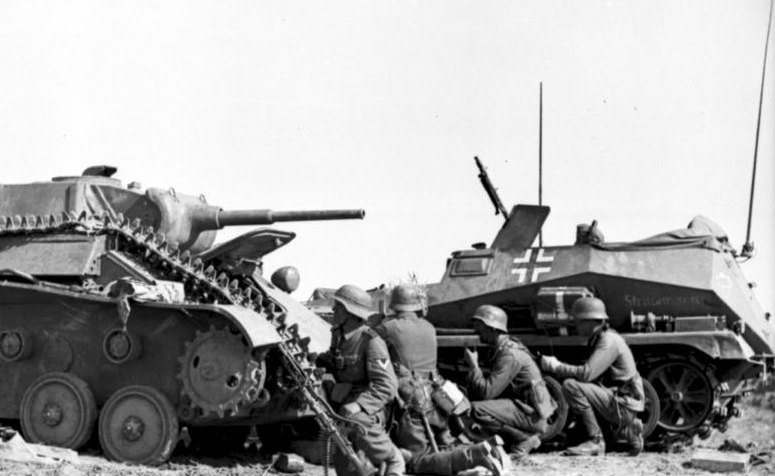
- German troops take cover behind a knocked out T-70 light tank and beside a Sd.Kfz. 250 halftrack, summer 1942
| Date | 28 June – 24 November 1942 (4 months, 3 weeks and 6 days) |
| Location | Voronezh, Rostov to Stalingrad, Kuban, Caucasus, and Southern Russia, Soviet Union |
| Result | Soviet victory |

Belligerents
| Germany; Romania; Hungary; Italy; Slovakia; Croatia (Note: Around 6,000 men of the Croatian Home Guard served in the German 6th Army as the 369th Infantry Regiment and in the Italian 8th Army as the Light Transport Brigade) | Soviet Union |

Commanders and leaders
| Adolf Hitler; Franz Halder; Kurt Zeitzler (Note: Replaced Halder as OKH Chief of Staff on 24 September 1942); Fedor von Bock; Maximilian von Weichs; Wilhelm List; Friedrich Paulus; Hermann Hoth; Hans von Salmuth; Ewald von Kleist; Richard Ruoff; Erich von Manstein; Alexander Löhr; Wolfram von Richthofen; C. Constantinescu-Claps; Gusztáv Jány; Italo Gariboldi; Petre Dumitrescu | Joseph Stalin; Georgy Zhukov; Aleksandr Vasilevsky; Filipp Golikov; Konstantin Rokossovsky; Semyon Timoshenko; Vasily Gordov; Andrey Yeryomenko; Nikolai Vatutin; Vasily Chuikov; Nikolai Pukhov; Alexander Lizyukov †; Mikhail Parsegov; Dmitry Ryabyshev; Kirill Moskalenko; Feofan Parkhomenko; Timofei Khriukin; Stepan Krasovsky |

Strength
| Initially: 1,570,287–1,805,000 (incl. Italian Eighth Army from early August): (Nazi Germany) : 1,210,861; (Fascist Italy) : 235,000 Italian Eighth Army; (Kingdom of Hungary (1920–1946)) : 209,000 Hungarian Second Army; (Kingdom of Romania) : 159,426; 1,934 tanks/assault guns (Note: Not all of those tanks were serviceable at the beginning of the offensive, as tanks were in repair, already engaged in combat, refitting, or not present at the frontline.); 1,593–2,035 aircraft | Initially: 1,715,000; 1,000,000 (in reserve); 2,959–3,720 tanks 1,671 aircraft 16,500 artillery pieces Total: 2,715,000 |

Casualties and losses
| (Nazi Germany) : 200,000; 700 tanks destroyed (Kingdom of Romania) (Kingdom of Hungary (1920–1946)) (Fascist Italy) (Slovak Republic (1939–1945)) : ~150,000; Total: 350,000 (excluding 150,000 casualties in the first phase of the Battle of the Caucasus) | 1,200,000; 4,862 tanks and SPG destroyed or damaged (including casualties in the first phase of the Battle of the Caucasus) |

Case Blue (German: Fall Blau) was the Wehrmacht's plan for the 1942 summer offensive in southern Russia between 28 June and 24 November 1942, during World War II. The objective was to capture the oil fields of Baku (Azerbaijan SSR), Grozny and Maikop, to enable the Germans to obtain fuel and also to deny it to the Soviet Union, bringing about the complete collapse of the Soviet war effort.

After Operation Barbarossa failed to destroy the Soviet Union as a political and military threat the previous year, Adolf Hitler recognized that Germany was now locked in a war of attrition and he was also aware that Germany had a chronic fuel shortage and would not be able to continue attacking deeper into Soviet territory without more. Hitler ordered the preparation of offensive plans for summer 1942 to secure the Soviet oil fields in the Caucasus. The operation involved a two-pronged attack: one from the Axis right flank against the oil fields of Baku, known as Operation Edelweiss, and one from the left flank to protect the flank of the first attack, moving in the direction of Stalingrad along the Don River, known as Operation Fischreiher.

Army Group South (Heeresgruppe Süd) was divided into Army Group A and Army Group B (Heeresgruppe A and Heeresgruppe B). Army Group A was to fulfil Operation Edelweiss by crossing the Caucasus Mountains to reach the Baku oil fields, while Army Group B protected its flanks along the Volga by fulfilling Operation Fischreiher. Supported by 2,035 Luftwaffe aircraft and 1,934 tanks and assault guns, the 1,570,287-man Army Group South began the offensive on 28 June, advancing 48 kilometers on the first day and easily brushing aside the 1,715,000 Red Army troops opposite, who wrongly expected a German offensive on Moscow even after Blau commenced. The Soviet collapse in the south allowed the Germans to capture the western part of Voronezh on 6 July and reach and cross the Don River near Stalingrad on 26 July. Army Group B's approach toward Stalingrad slowed in late July and early August owing to constant counterattacks by new Red Army reserves and overstretched German supply lines. The Germans defeated the Soviets in the Battle of Kalach and the Battle of Stalingrad began in late August. Non-stop Luftwaffe bombing, artillery-fire and street fighting destroyed the city and inflicted many casualties on the Red Army. After three months of battle, the Germans controlled 90 percent of Stalingrad on 19 November.

In the south, Army Group A captured Rostov-on-Don on 23 July and swept south from the Don to the Caucasus, capturing the demolished oilfields at Maikop on 9 August and Elista on 13 August near the Caspian Sea coast. Determined Soviet resistance and the long distances from Axis sources of supply reduced the Axis offensive to local advances only and prevented the Germans from completing their strategic objective of capturing the main Caucasian oilfield at Baku. Luftwaffe bombers destroyed the oilfields at Grozny but attacks on Baku were prevented by the short range of the German fighters.

The Red Army defeated the Germans at Stalingrad, following Operation Uranus and Operation Little Saturn. This defeat forced the Axis to retreat from the Caucasus during the Battle of Caucasus to avoid being cut off by the Red Army, that was now advancing from Stalingrad towards Rostov. Only the Kuban region remained tentatively occupied by Axis troops.

== Axis strategy ==
=== Background ===
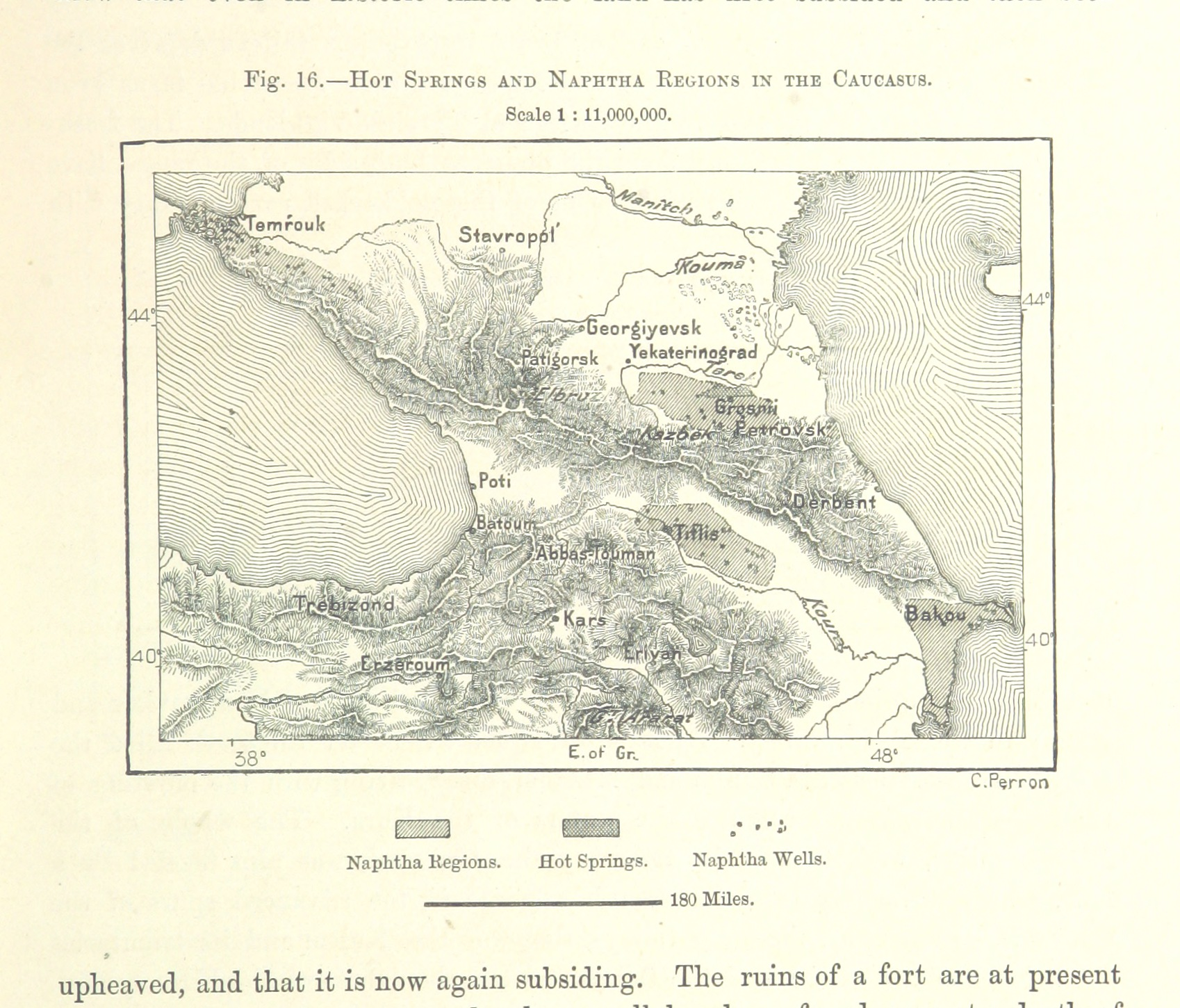
19th-century map of the Caucasus; the oilfields (marked here as "naphtha regions") were the main target of Case Blue.

On 22 June 1941, Germany launched Operation Barbarossa to defeat the Soviet Union in a Blitzkrieg which was expected to last only three months. The Axis offensive had met with initial success and the Red Army had suffered some of the greatest defeats in military history, before halting the Axis units just short of Moscow (November–December 1941). The Germans had captured vast areas of land and important industrial centers but the Soviet Union remained in the war. In the winter of 1941–1942, the Soviets struck back in several successful counter-offensives, pushing back the Germans from Moscow. Despite these setbacks, Hitler wanted the complete destruction of Russia, for which he required the oil resources of the Caucasus.

By February 1942 the German Army High Command (OKH) had begun to plan for a follow-up campaign to Barbarossa – with the Caucasus as its principal objective. On 5 April 1942, Hitler laid out the elements of the plan, now "Case Blue" (Fall Blau) in Führer Directive No. 41. The directive outlined the main goals of the 1942 summer campaign on the Eastern Front, holding attacks for Army Group Centre, the capture of Leningrad and the link-up with Finland for Army Group North and the capture of the Caucasus for Army Group South. The schwerpunkt (main effort) was to be in the south.

=== The oilfields ===
The Caucasus, a large, culturally diverse region traversed by its eponymous mountains, is bounded by the Black Sea to the west and the Caspian Sea to the east. The region north of the mountains was a production center for grain, cotton and heavy farm machinery, while its two largest oilfields, at Maikop, near the Black Sea, and Grozny, about halfway between the Black and the Caspian Seas, produced about 10 percent of all Soviet oil. South of the mountains lay Transcaucasia, comprising Georgia, Azerbaijan and Armenia. This industrialized and densely populated area contained some of the largest oilfields in the world. Baku, the capital of Azerbaijan, was one of the richest, producing 80 percent of the Soviet oil—about 24 million tons in 1942.

The Caucasus also possessed plentiful coal, peat, nonferrous and rare metals. Manganese deposits at Chiatura, in Transcaucasia, formed the richest single source in the world, yielding 1.5 million tons of manganese ore annually, half of the Soviet Union's total production. The Kuban region of the Caucasus also produced large amounts of wheat, corn, sunflower seeds, and sugar beets, all essential in the production of food.

These resources were of immense importance to the German war effort. Of the three million tons of oil Germany consumed per year, 85 percent was imported, mainly from the United States, Venezuela, and Iran. When war broke out in September 1939, the British naval blockade cut Germany off from the Americas and the Middle East, leaving the country reliant on oil-rich European countries such as Romania to supply the resource. An indication of German reliance on Romania is evident from its oil consumption; in 1938, just one-third of the 7,500,000 tons consumed by Germany came from domestic stocks. Oil had always been Germany's Achilles heel, and by the end of 1941, Hitler had nearly exhausted Germany's reserves, which left him with only two significant sources of oil, the country's own synthetic production and the Romanian oilfields, with the latter supplying 75% of Germany's oil imports in 1941. Aware of his declining oil resources, and fearful of enemy air attacks on Romania (Germany's main source of crude oil), Hitler's strategy was increasingly driven by the need to protect Romania and acquire new resources, essential if he wanted to continue waging a prolonged war against a growing list of enemies. In late 1941, the Romanians warned Hitler that their stocks were exhausted and they were unable to meet German demands. For these reasons, the Soviet oilfields were extremely important to Germany's industry and armed forces as the war became global, the power of the Allies grew, and shortages started to occur in Axis resources.

== Planning ==
=== Axis forces ===
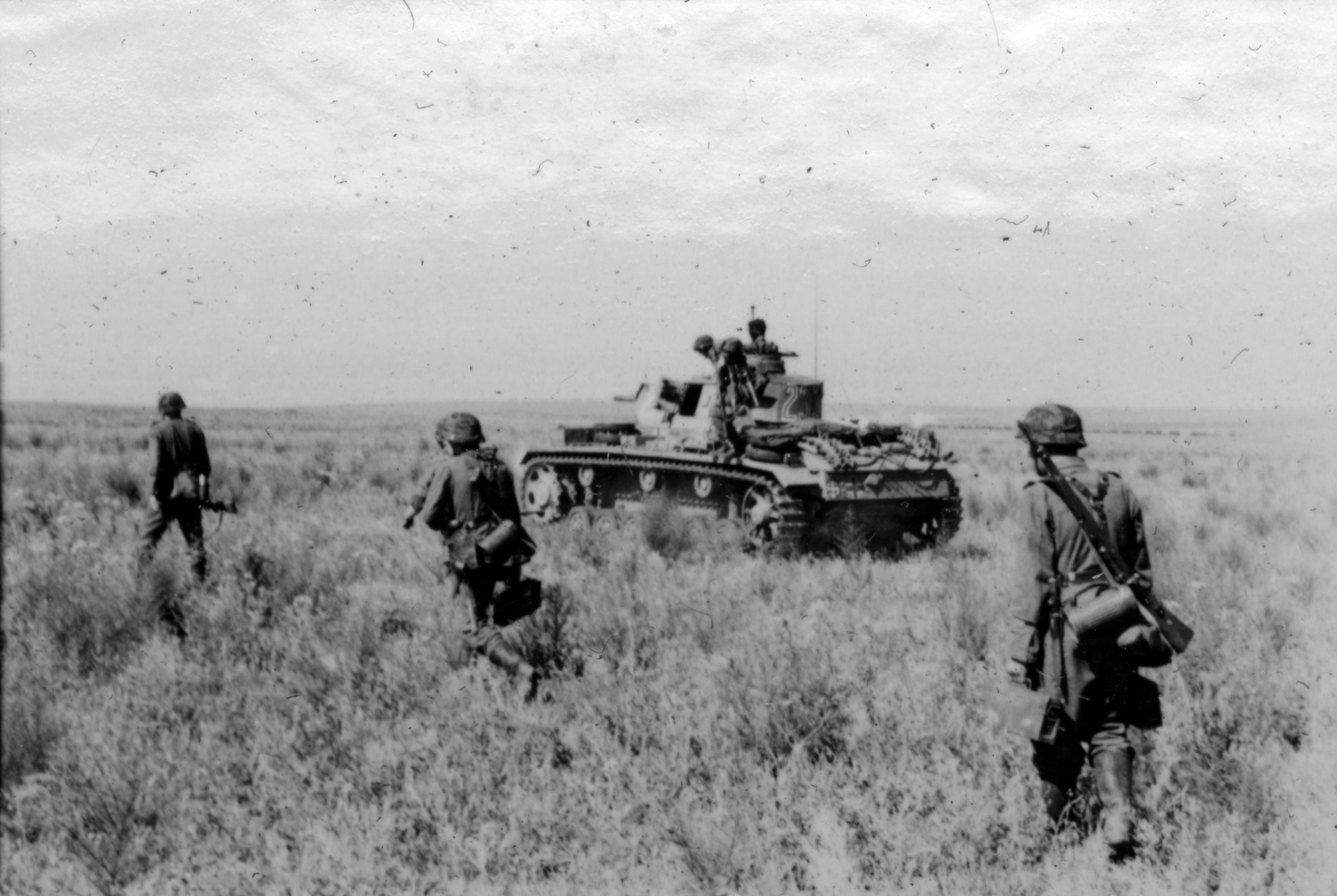
Waffen-SS infantry and armor advancing, Summer 1942

The German plan involved a three-staged attack:

- Blau I: Fourth Panzer Army, commanded by Hermann Hoth (transferred from Army Group Centre) and the Second Army, supported by the Second Hungarian Army, would attack from Kursk to Voronezh and continue the advance, anchoring the northern flank of the offensive towards the Volga.
- Blau II: Sixth Army, commanded by Friedrich Paulus, would attack from Kharkov and move in parallel with Fourth Panzer Army, to reach the Volga at Stalingrad (whose capture was not deemed necessary).
- Blau III: First Panzer Army would then strike south towards the lower Don River, with Seventeenth Army on the western flank and Fourth Romanian Army on the eastern flank.

The strategic objectives of the operation were the oilfields at Maykop, Grozny and Baku. As in Barbarossa, these movements were expected to result in a series of grand encirclements of Soviet troops.

The offensive was to be conducted across the southern Russian (Kuban) steppe utilizing the following Army Group units:

Army Group B
commander

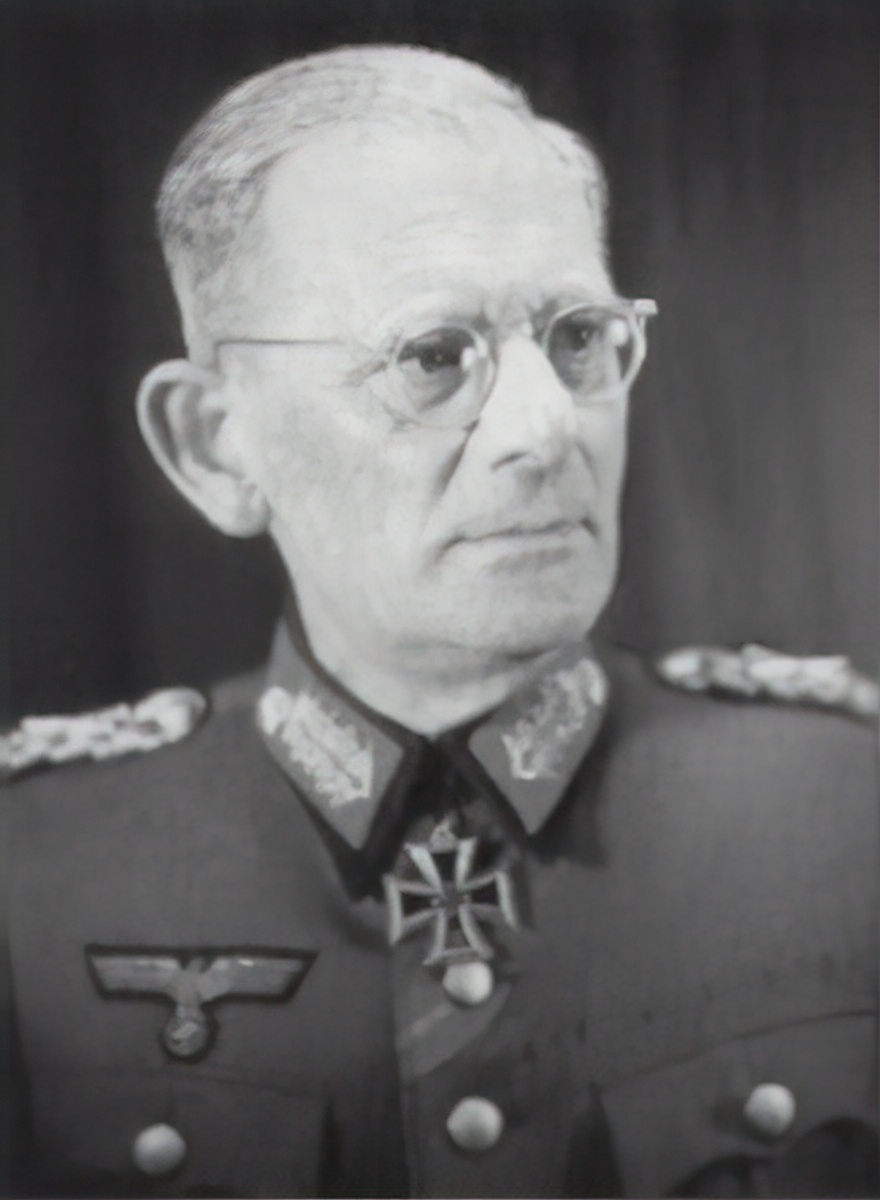
Maximillian von Weichs

Luftwaffe commanders

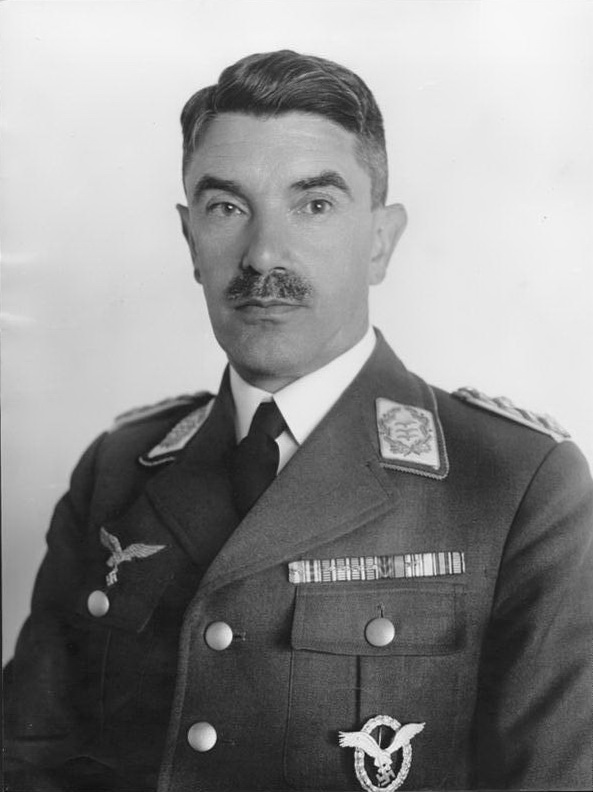
Alexander Löhr

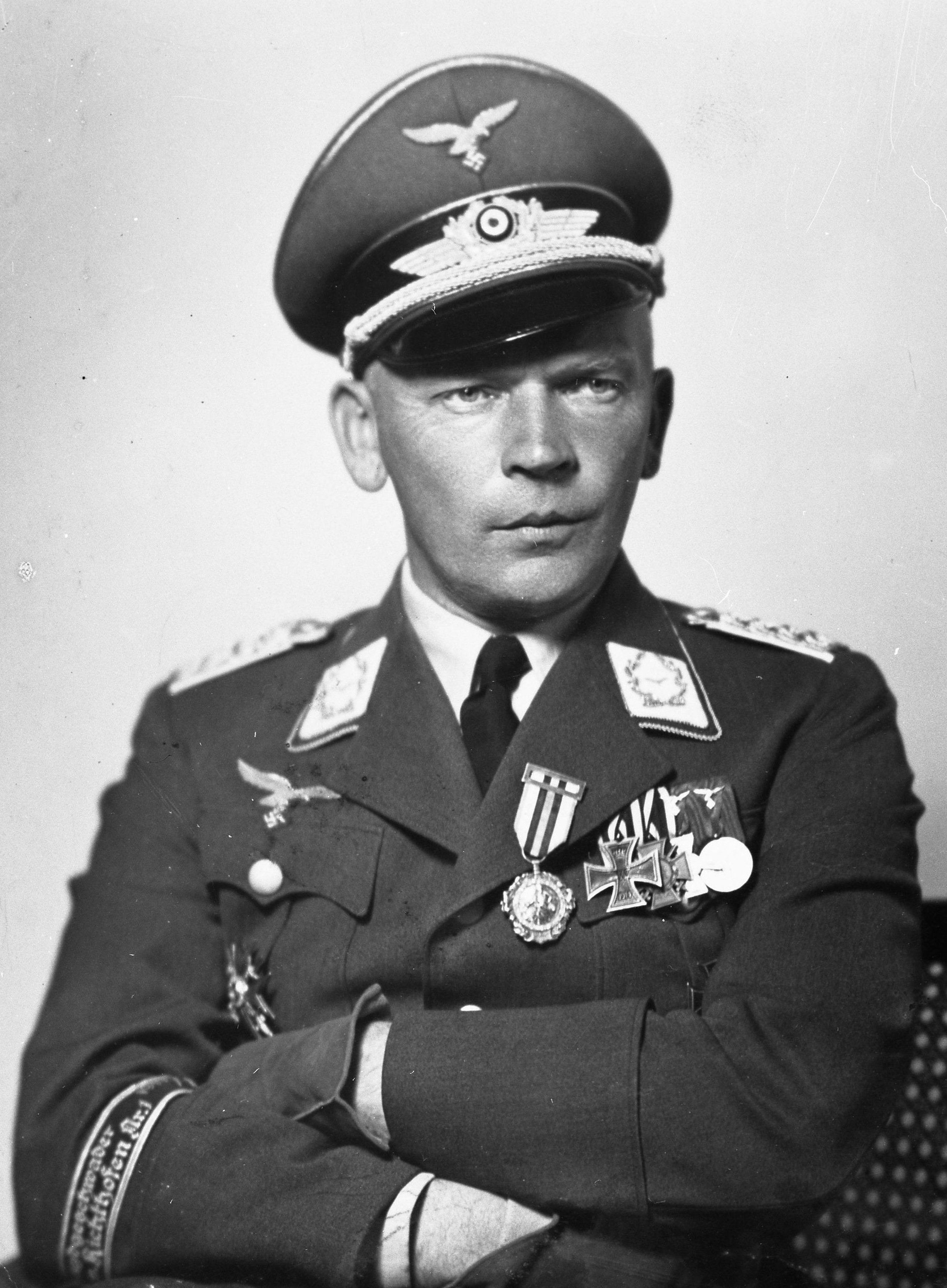
Wolfram Freiherr von Richthofen

Northern Sector (Volga campaign)

Army Group B
Generaloberst Maximilian von Weichs (Note: Took command upon Bock being relieved by Hitler 17 July.)

Second Army (General Hans von Salmuth) (Note: Took command upon Weichs being raised to army group command 17 July.)

LV Army Corps (R. von Roman)

Fourth Panzer Army (Generaloberst Hermann Hoth)

XXIV Panzer Corps (W. Langermann und Erlenkamp) (Note: KIA 3 October at Storoshewoje on the Middle Don.)
XXXXVIII Panzer Corps (W. Kempf)
XIII Army Corps (E. Straube)

Sixth Army (General der Panzertruppe Friedrich Paulus) (Note: Surrendered remains of Sixth Army at Stalingrad 31 January 1943.)

XXXX Panzer Corps (G. Stumme) (Note: A set of plans for Fall Blau held by an officer of one of Stumme's panzer divisions fell into Soviet hands on 19 June. Furious at this breach, Hitler relieved Stumme 21 July and had him court-martialed. Stumme was reassigned to the Afrika Korps and was killed in action 12 October at El Alamein.)
LI Army Corps (W. von Seydlitz-Kurzbach)
VIII Army Corps (W. Heitz) (Note: Captured at Stalingrad 31 January 1943, died in captivity 9 February 1944.)
XVII Army Corps (K. Hollidt)
XXIX Army Corps (H. von Obstfelder)

Hungarian Second Army (Colonel-General Vitéz Gusztáv Jány) (Note: Executed by firing squad for war crimes November 1947.)

III Corps (G. Rakovsky)
VII Army Corps (Wehrmacht) (E.-E. Hell)
Arrived 21–25 July:

IV Corps (L. Csatay) (Note: Committed suicide October 1944 following arrest by the Gestapo.)
VII Corps (E. Gyimesi)

Romanian Fourth Army
Italian Eighth Army (Arrived 11–15 August) (General Italo Gariboldi)

II Corps (G. Zanghieri)
XXXV Corps (G. Messe)
Alpini Corps (G. Nasci)

Luftflotte 4
Generaloberst Alexander Löhr (Note: Executed by firing squad in Yugoslavia for war crimes February 1947.) (thru 20 July)
Generalfeldmarschall Wolfram Freiherr von Richthofen (Note: Died of a brain tumor in American captivity 12 July 1945.) (from 20 July)

8th Air Corps
4th Air Corps

German air strength in the east numbered 2,644 aircraft on 20 June 1942, over 20% more than a month earlier. Whereas in 1941 most units fought on the central front supporting Army Group Centre, 1,610 aircraft (61%), supported Army Group South.

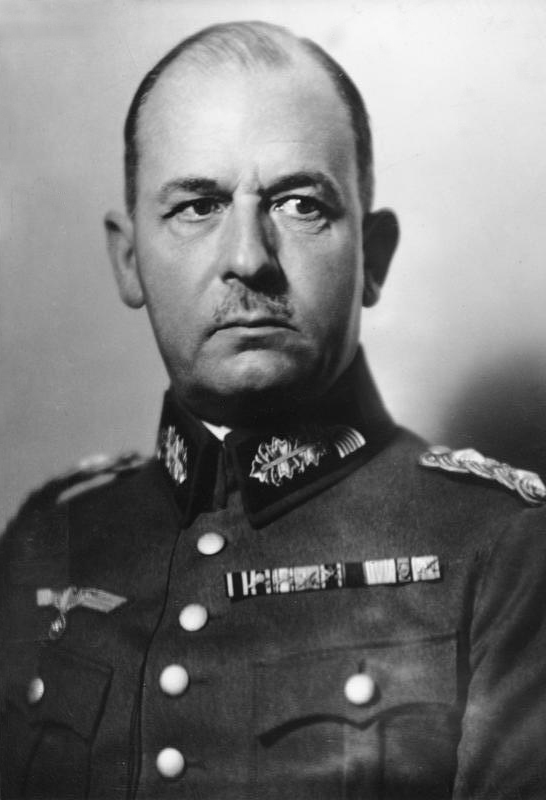
Wilhelm List

Southern Sector (Caucasus campaign)

Army Group A
Generalfeldmarschall Wilhelm List

First Panzer Army
Seventeenth Army
Third Romanian Army (Note: The Third Romanian Army was later assigned to Army Group B and was one of the two Romanian armies heavily engaged in Operation Uranus.)
Eleventh Army (Note: After the successful completion of the battle for the Kerch Peninsula, 11th Army was split and only parts of it were assigned to Army Group A.)

=== Soviet forces ===
The Soviet army command (Stavka) failed to discern the direction of the main German strategic offensive anticipated in 1942, even though they were in possession of the German plans. On 19 June, the chief of operations of the 23rd Panzer Division, Major Joachim Reichel, was shot down over Soviet-held territory while flying an observation aircraft over the front near Kharkov. The Soviets recovered maps from his aircraft detailing the exact German plans for Case Blue. The plans were handed over to Stavka, in Moscow.

Joseph Stalin, however, believing it to be a German ruse, remained convinced that the primary German strategic goal in 1942 would be Moscow, in part due to Operation Kremlin (Fall Kreml), a German deception plan aimed at the city. As a result, the majority of Red Army troops were deployed there, although the direction from which the Case Blue offensive would come was still defended by the Bryansk, Southwestern, Southern and North Caucasian Fronts. With about 1 million soldiers at the front line and another 1.7 million in reserve armies, their forces accounted for about one quarter of all Soviet troops. Following the disastrous start of Case Blue for the Soviets, they reorganized their frontlines several times. Over the course of the campaign, the Soviets also fielded the Voronezh Front, Don Front, Stalingrad Front, Transcaucasian Front, and the Caucasian Front, though not all existed at the same time.

With the German thrust expected in the north, Stavka planned several local offensives in the south to weaken the Germans. The most important of these was aimed at the city of Kharkov and would be conducted mainly by the Southwestern Front under Semyon Timoshenko, supported by the Southern Front commanded by Rodion Malinovsky. The operation was scheduled for 12 May, just prior to a planned German offensive in the area. The ensuing Second Battle of Kharkov ended in disaster for the Soviets, severely weakening their mobile forces. At the same time, the Axis clearing of the Kerch Peninsula together with the Battle of Sevastopol, which lasted until July, weakened the Soviets further and allowed the Germans to supply Army Group A across the Kerch Peninsula through the Kuban.

The Red Army order of battle at the start of the campaign was as follows:

Northern Sector (Volga campaign)
Armies deployed north to south:

Bryansk Front ground and
aviation commanders

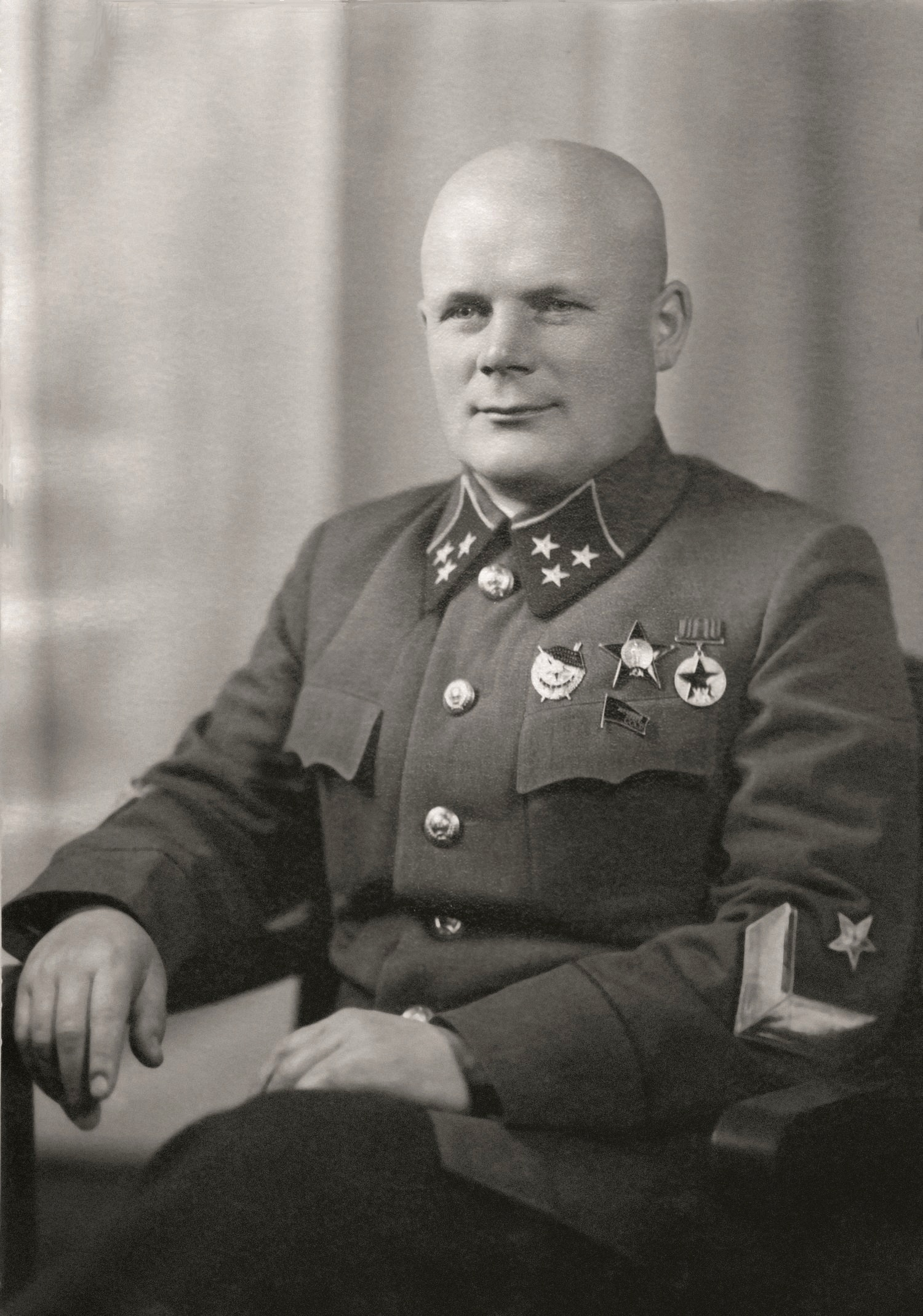
Filipp I. Golikov

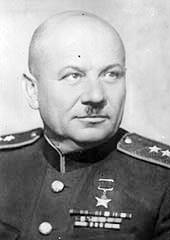
Stepan Y. Krasovsky

Bryansk Front
Generalleutnant Filipp I. Golikov (Note: Relieved for military incompetence and reassigned March 1943.)

48th Army (G.A. Khaliuzin)

4 rifle divisions (1 Guards), 2 rifle brigades, 2 tank brigades, 1 cavalry division

13th Army (N.P. Pukhov)

5 rifle divisions, 1 rifle brigade, 1 tank brigade

5th Tank Army (A.I. Liziukov) (KIA 23 July)

7 tank brigades

3rd Army (P.P. Korzun)

6 rifle divisions, 2 rifle brigades, 2 tank brigades

40th Army (M.A. Parsegov)

6 rifle divisions, 3 rifle brigades, 2 tank brigades

Front forces

2 rifle divisions (1 Guards), 1 rifle brigade, 20 tank brigades (2 Guards), 6 cavalry divisions

Second Air Army
Generalmajor Stepan Y. Krasovsky

Aviation divisions: 3 fighter, 4 ground attack, 2 bomber, 1 night bomber

Southwestern Front ground and
aviation commanders

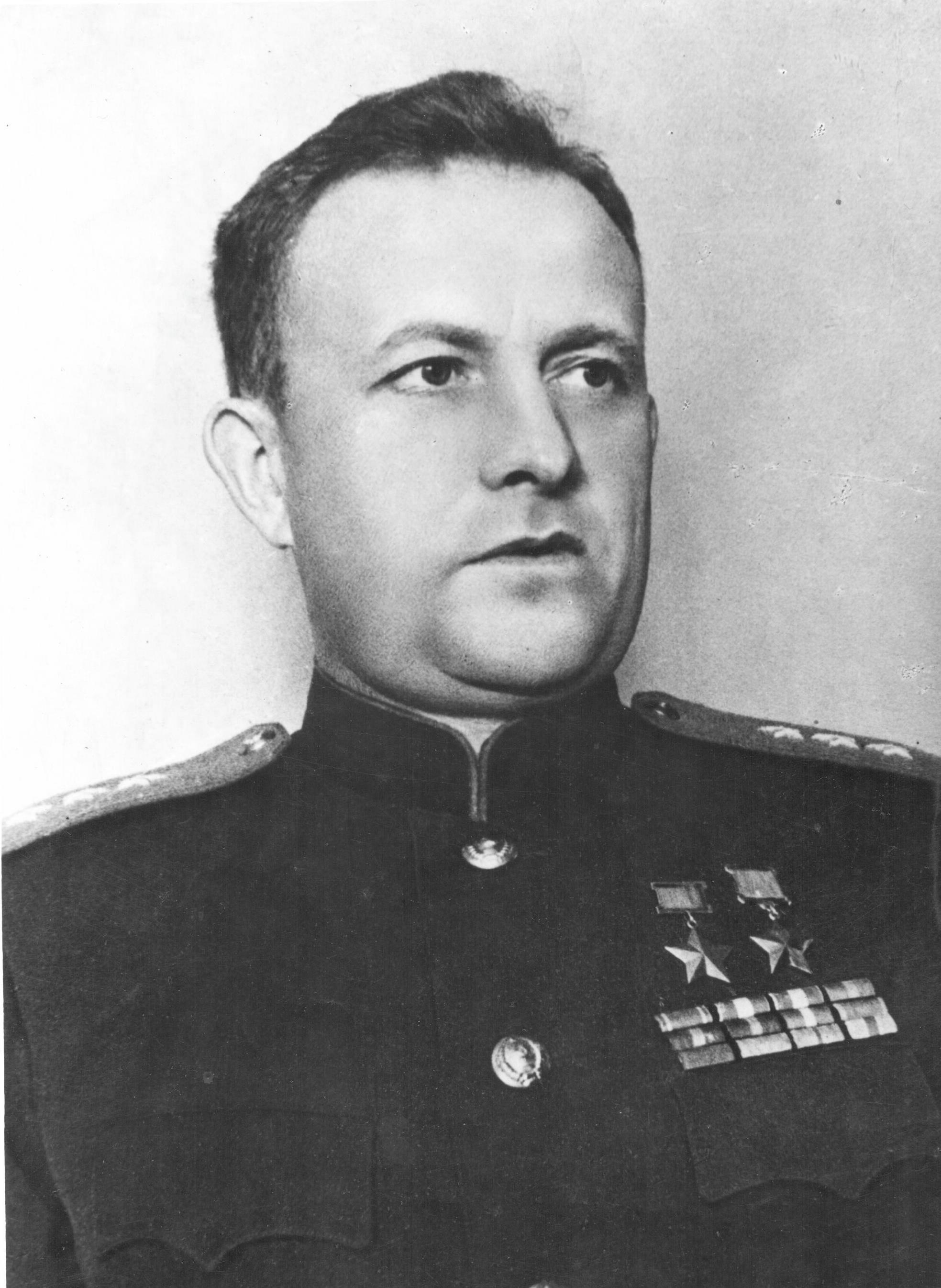
Timofei T. Khriukin

Southwestern Front
Marshal Semyon K. Timoshenko (Note: Relieved for military incompetence and reassigned 22 July.)

28th Army (D.I. Riabyshev)

7 rifle divisions (1 Guards), 5 tank brigades (1 Guards)

38th Army (K.S. Moskalenko)

8 rifle divisions, 7 tank brigades, 1 independent tank battalion

9th Army (F.A. Parkhomenko)

8 rifle divisions, 1 tank brigade, 3 cavalry divisions

21st Army (A.I. Danilov)

5 rifle divisions, 1 NKVD motorized rifle division, 3 tank brigades

Front forces

8 tank brigades, 2 independent tank battalions, 3 cavalry divisions

Eighth Air Army
Generalmajor Timofei T. Khriukin

Aviation divisions: 5 fighter, 2 ground attack, 2 bomber, 2 night bomber

== The offensive ==
=== Opening phase ===
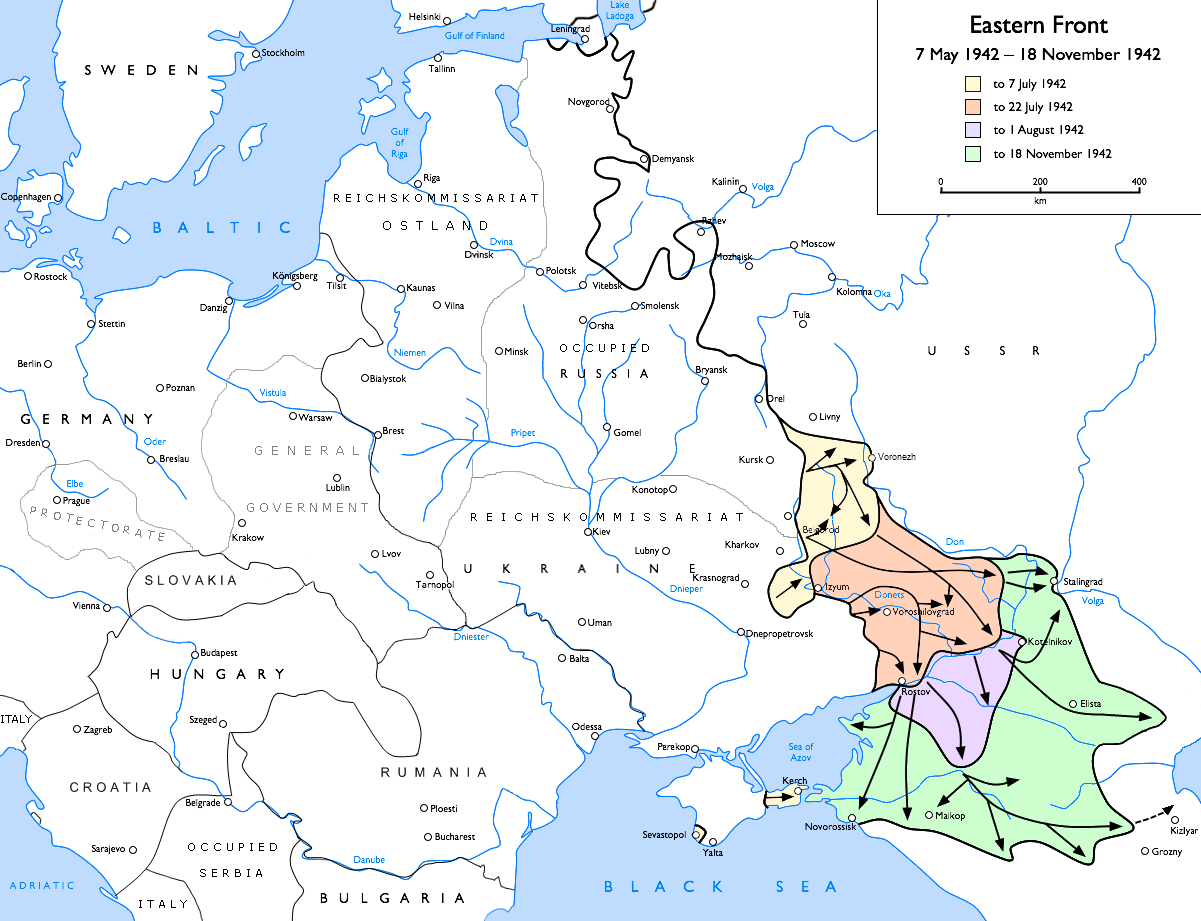
The German advance from 7 May to 18 November 1942. to 7 July to 22 July to 1 August to 18 November

The German offensive commenced on 28 June 1942, with Fourth Panzer Army starting its drive towards Voronezh. Due to a chaotic Soviet retreat, the Germans were able to advance rapidly, restoring Wehrmacht confidence for the upcoming major offensive.

Close air support from the Luftwaffe also played an important role in this early success. It contained the Red Air Force, through air superiority operations, and provided interdiction through attacks on airfields and Soviet defence lines. At times, the German air arm acted as a spearhead rather than a support force, ranging on ahead of the tanks and infantry to disrupt and destroy defensive positions. As many as 100 German aircraft were concentrated on a single Soviet division in the path of the spearhead during this phase. General Kazakov, the Bryansk Front's chief of staff, noted the strength and effectiveness of the Axis aviation. Within 26 days, the Soviets lost 783 aircraft from the 2nd, 4th, 5th and 8th Air Armies, compared to a German total of 175.

By 5 July, forward elements of Fourth Panzer Army had reached the Don River near Voronezh and became embroiled in the battle to capture the city. Stalin and the Soviet command still expected the main German thrust in the north against Moscow, and believed the Germans would turn north after Voronezh to threaten the capital. As a result, the Soviets rushed reinforcements into the town to hold it at all costs and counterattacked the Germans' northern flank in an effort to cut off the German spearheads. 5th Tank Army, commanded by Major General A.I. Liziukov, managed to achieve some minor successes when it began its attack on 6 July, but was forced back to its starting positions by 15 July, losing about half of its tanks in the process. Although the battle was a success, Hitler and Fedor von Bock, commander of Army Group South, argued over the next steps in the operation. The heated debate, and continuing Soviet counterattacks, which tied down Fourth Panzer Army until 13 July, caused Hitler to lose his temper and dismiss Bock on 17 July. As part of the second phase of the operation, on 9 July, Army Group South was split into Army Group A and Army Group B, with Wilhelm List appointed as commander of Army Group A and Army Group B commanded by Maximillian von Weichs.

Only two weeks into the operation, on 11 July, the Germans began to suffer logistical difficulties, which slowed the advance. The German Sixth Army was continually delayed by fuel shortages. Eight days later, on 20 July, shortages of fuel were still undermining operations, leaving many units unable to execute their orders. The 23rd Panzer Division and 24th Panzer Division both became stranded during the opening phase. Once again, as it had done during the Norwegian Campaign in April 1940, and Barbarossa in 1941, the Luftwaffe's Junkers Ju 52 transport fleet flew in supplies to keep the army going. The situation remained difficult with German troops forced to recover fuel from damaged or abandoned vehicles, and in some cases, leave behind tanks and vehicles with heavy fuel consumption to continue their advance. This undermined the strength of the units, which were forced to leave fighting vehicles behind. Nevertheless, the Luftwaffe flew in 200 tons of fuel per day to keep the army supplied. Despite this impressive performance in keeping the army mobile, Löhr was replaced by the more impetuous and offensive-minded Richthofen.

=== Splitting of Army Group South ===
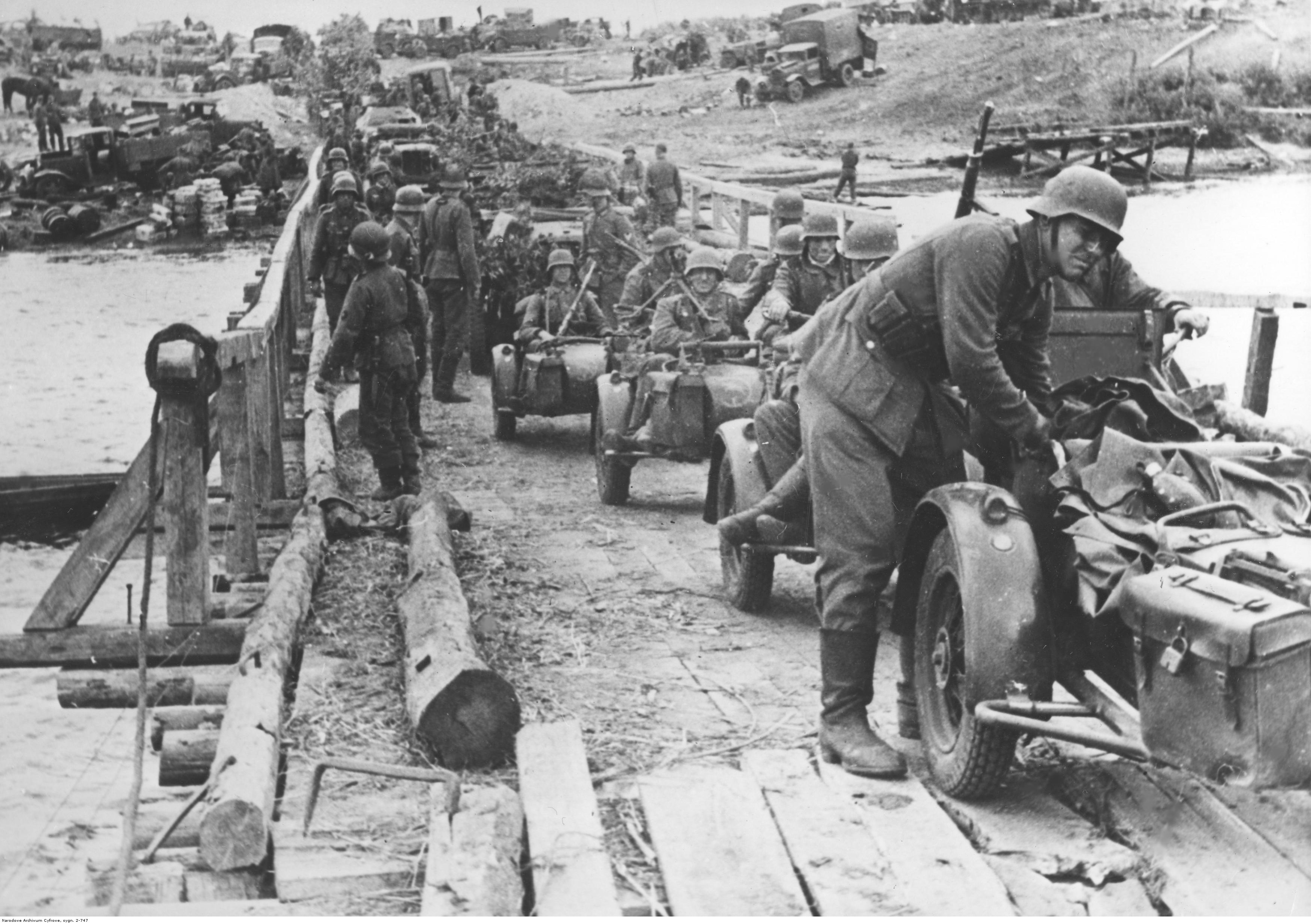
German motorcycle infantry cross the Don River on a timber bridge, July 1942. Abandoned Soviet vehicles and supplies are seen in the background.

Believing that the main Soviet threat had been eliminated, desperately short of oil and needing to meet all the ambitious objectives of Case Blue, Hitler made a series of changes to the plan in Führer Directive No. 45 on July 23, 1942:

- reorganized Army Group South into two smaller Army Groups, A and B;
- directed Army Group A to advance to the Caucasus and capture the oil fields (Operation Edelweiß);
- directed Army Group B to attack towards the Volga and Stalingrad (Operation Fischreiher).

There is no evidence Hitler was opposed by, or received complaints from Franz Halder, Chief of the General Staff, or anyone else, about the directive until August 1942. The new directive created enormous logistical difficulties, with Hitler expecting both Army Groups to advance along different routes. Logistics lines were already at breaking point with ammunition and fuel shortages most apparent and it would be impossible to advance using the conservative supply rates he demanded. The divergence of the Army Groups would also open a dangerous gap between the Armies, which could be exploited by the Soviets. The Italian Alpine Corps, of the Italian Army in the Soviet Union, did not arrive in the Caucasus Mountains with Army Group A, instead remaining with Sixth Army. Army Group A was expected to operate in mountain terrain with only three mountain divisions and two infantry divisions unsuited to the task.

The splitting of Army Group South enabled the launching of Operation Edelweiss and Operation Fischreiher, the two main thrusts of the Army Groups. Both groups had to achieve their objectives simultaneously, instead of consecutively. The success of the initial advance was such that Hitler ordered the Fourth Panzer Army south to assist the First Panzer Army to cross the lower Don river. This assistance was not needed and Kleist later complained that Fourth Panzer Army clogged the roads and that if they had carried on toward Stalingrad, they could have taken it in July. When it turned north again two weeks later, the Soviets had gathered enough forces together at Stalingrad to check its advance.

=== Army Group A: Caucasus ===
==== Breaking into the Caucasus ====
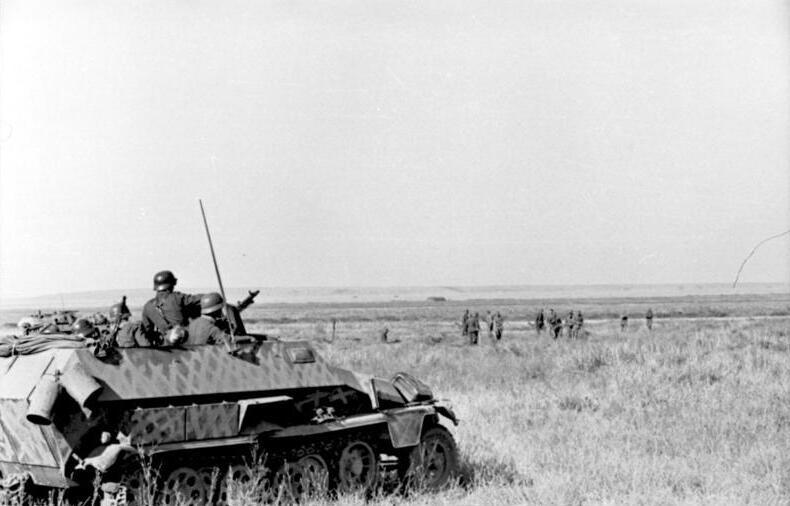
German troops and a Sd.Kfz. 251 armored half-track on the Russian steppe, August 1942

With air support from the Ju 87s of Sturzkampfgeschwader 77, List's Army Group A recaptured Rostov, the "gate to the Caucasus", on 23 July 1942 relatively easily. The Luftwaffe had air superiority in the early phase of the operation, which was of great help to the ground forces. With the Don crossing secured and Sixth Army's advance flagging on the Volga front, Hitler transferred the Fourth Panzer Army to Army Group B and sent it back to the Volga. The redeployment used enormous amounts of fuel to transfer the army by air and road.

After crossing the Don on 25 July, Army Group A fanned out on a 200 km (120 mi) front from the Sea of Azov to Zymlianskaya (today Zymlyansk). The German Seventeenth Army, along with elements of the Eleventh Army and the Romanian Third Army, manoeuvred west towards the east coast of the Black Sea, while the First Panzer Army attacked to the south-east. The Seventeenth Army made a slow advance but the First Panzer Army had freedom of action. On 29 July the Germans cut the last direct railway between central Russia and the Caucasus, causing considerable panic to Stalin and Stavka, which led to the passing of Order No. 227 "Not a step back!". Salsk was captured on 31 July and Stavropol on 5 August. Although the army group made a quick advance, by 3 August the vanguard comprised only light mobile forces and most of the tanks lagged behind, due to lack of fuel and supply breakdowns, despite the efforts of 4th Air Corps, which flew in supplies around the clock.

On 9 August, the First Panzer Army reached Maikop in the foothills of the Caucasus mountains, having advanced more than 480 kilometers (300 mi) in fewer than two weeks. The western oil fields near Maikop were seized in a commando operation from 8–9 August, but the oil fields had been sufficiently destroyed by the Red Army to take about a year to be repaired. Shortly afterwards Pyatigorsk was taken. On 12 August, Krasnodar was captured and German mountain troops hoisted the Nazi flag on the highest mountain of the Caucasus, Mount Elbrus.

The length of the German advance created chronic supply difficulties, particularly of petrol; the Black Sea was judged too dangerous and fuel was brought by rail through Rostov or delivered by air, but panzer divisions were sometimes at a standstill for weeks. Even petrol trucks ran out of fuel and oil had to be brought up on camels. With the Soviets often retreating instead of fighting, the number of prisoners fell short of expectations and only 83,000 were taken. As Hitler and OKH began to concentrate on Stalingrad, some of Kleist's mobile forces were diverted. Kleist lost his flak corps and most of the Luftwaffe supporting the southern front, only reconnaissance aircraft being left behind. The Voyenno-Vozdushnye Sily (VVS) brought in about 800 bombers, a third of which were operational. With the transfer of air cover and flak units, Soviet bombers were free to harass the German advance. The quality of the Soviet resistance increased, with many of the forces used coming from local levies, who Kleist thought were willing to fight harder for their homeland. German units were especially bogged down by fighting Georgian alpine and mountain troops, who greatly contributed to stalling their advance. The quantity of replacements and supplies the Soviets committed increased, and faced with these difficulties, the Axis advance slowed after 28 August.

==== Battle for the oilfields ====
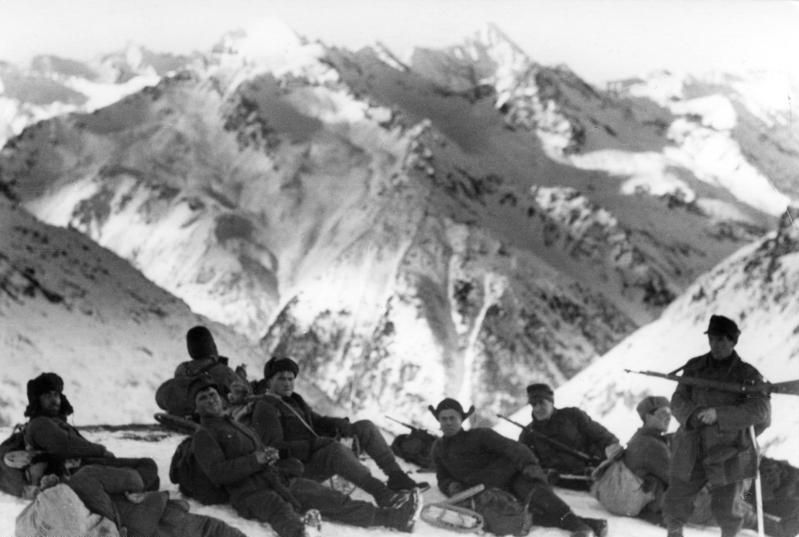
German Gebirgsjäger in the Caucasus

In the south-east, the Wehrmacht headed in the direction of Grozny and Baku, the other important petroleum centers. More installations and industrial centers fell into German hands, many intact or only slightly damaged during the Russian retreat. From August–September, the Taman Peninsula and a part of the Novorossiysk naval base were captured. The Germans continued towards Tuapse on the Black Sea coast and in the east Elista was taken on 13 August. In the south, the German advance was stopped north of Grozny, after taking Mozdok on 25 August. German paratroopers assisted an insurgency in Chechnya, operating behind Soviet lines. German mountain troops failed to secure the Black Sea ports and the advance fell short of Grozny as supply difficulties arose once more. The Soviets dug in the 9th and 44th armies of the North Transcaucasian Front along the rocky Terek River bank in front (north) of the city. The Luftwaffe was unable to support the German army that far forward and Soviet aviation attacked bridges and supply routes virtually unopposed. The Germans crossed the river on 2 September but made only slow progress. At the beginning of September, Hitler had a major argument with the High Command and specifically List, as he perceived the advance of the German forces as too slow. As a result, Hitler dismissed List on 9 September and took direct command of Army Group A himself.

Axis ships transported 30,605 men, 13,254 horses and 6,265 motor vehicles across the Black Sea from Romania, from 1–2 September. With the reinforcements, the Germans captured most of the Black Sea naval bases but were held up at Novorossiysk, where the Soviet 47th Army had prepared for a long siege. The port fell on 10 September, after a four-day battle, the final German victory in the Caucasus. It left the heights south of the port and several coast roads in the hands of 47th Soviet Army. Attempts to push out of Novorossiysk were costly failures and the Axis also failed to break the defences on the coastal plain from Novorossiysk to Tuapse, having only the strength to stabilize the line. Romanian Army losses were particularly high and the Romanian 3rd Mountain Division was nearly wiped out by a Soviet counter-attack from 25–26 September.

Further east, the Axis enjoyed greater success and on 1 September, the Germans took Khulkhuta (Хулхута́), halfway between Elista and Astrakhan. During August and September, German patrols raided the railway around Kizlyar, north-east of Grozny, marking the farthest advance of the German forces towards the Caspian Sea. In the south, the First Panzer Army advance on Grozny was stopped by the Red Army and the 14th Air Army. By late September, supply failures and the resistance of the Red Army slowed the Axis advance. The Germans took Nakchik on 26 October.

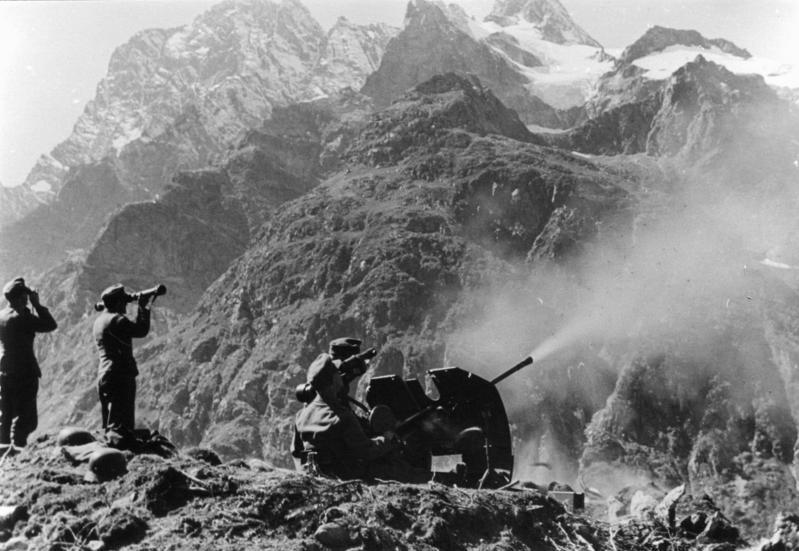
German Gebirgsjäger operating a 2 cm anti-aircraft gun in the Central Caucasus near Teberda, September 1942

On 2 November 1942, Romanian mountain troops (Vânători de munte) under the command of Brigadier General Ioan Dumitrache took Nalchik, the capital of Kabardino-Balkaria and also the farthest point of Axis advance into the Caucasus. This victory earned the Romanian General the Knight's Cross of the Iron Cross. Up to 10,000 prisoners were captured in two days, before the advance toward Grozny was stopped again west of the city at Vladikavkaz. On 5 November, Alagir was seized and the Alagir–Beslan–Malgobek line reached became the farthest German advance in the south. By this time, the gap between Army Groups A and B had left them vulnerable to a counter-offensive. Only the German 16th Motorized Infantry Division remained inside the gap, guarding the left flank of the First Panzer Army by securing the road towards Astrakhan. On 22 November, after several Soviet counter-attacks, Hitler appointed Kleist as Group commander with orders to hold his position and prepare to resume the offensive if Stalingrad could be taken.

==== Luftwaffe oil offensive ====
In the first week of October 1942, Hitler came to recognize that the capture of the Caucasus oil fields was unlikely before winter, which forced the Germans to take up defensive positions. Unable to capture them, he was determined to deny them to the enemy and ordered the Oberkommando der Luftwaffe (OKL) to inflict as much damage as possible.

On 8 October, Hitler called for the air offensive to be carried out no later than 14 October, as he required air assets for a major effort at Stalingrad. As a result, on 10 October 1942, Fliegerkorps IV of Luftflotte 4 (4th Air Corps of Fourth Air Fleet) was ordered to send every available bomber against the oilfields at Grozny. Fourth Air Fleet was in poor shape by this time – Richthofen had begun Case Blue with 323 serviceable bombers out of a total of 480. He was now down to 232, of which only 129 were combat ready. Nevertheless, the force could still deliver damaging blows. Attacks on the refineries reminded Richthofen of the attacks on Sevastopol several months earlier. Thick black smoke rose from the refineries to a height of 5,500 m (18,000 ft). On 12 October, further raids caused even more destruction. It had been a strategic mistake not to have made greater efforts to hit the oil refineries at Grozny and Baku sooner, as their destruction would have been a greater blow to the Soviets than the loss of Stalingrad, where most of the air fleet was deployed. On 19 November, the Soviet counter-offensive at Stalingrad compelled Richthofen to once more withdraw his units north to the Volga and bring an end to the aerial offensive.

Much damage was done at Grozny, but the remaining oilfields were beyond the logistical reach of the German Army as well as of the fighter aircraft of the Luftwaffe. Grozny was within range of German bombers from 4th Air Corps, based near the Terek River. But Grozny and the captured oilfields at Maikop produced only ten per cent of Soviet oil. The main fields at Baku were out of German fighter range. German bombers could have reached them, but it meant flying the most direct, thus most predictable route without protection. In August it might have been possible to carry out these operations owing to the weakness of Soviet air power in the region, but by October it had been considerably strengthened.

=== Army Group B: Volga ===
==== Don bend ====
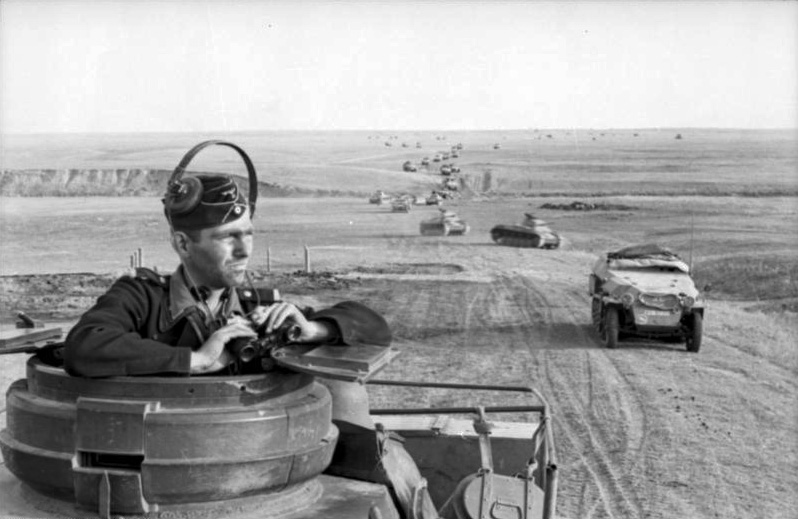
Advance towards Stalingrad at the Don

On 23 July, the main body of Army Group B started its advance toward the Don. The Germans met with increasing Soviet resistance from the new Stalingrad Front, with the 62nd and 64th Soviet Armies. On 26 July, XIV Panzer Corps broke through and reached the Don, where the new First and Fourth Tank Armies conducted several futile counter-attacks by inexperienced troops. In the south, Fourth Panzer Army made better progress against 51st Army. After crossing the Don, the Germans advanced on Kotelnikovo, reaching the town by 2 August. Soviet resistance convinced Paulus that Sixth Army was not strong enough to cross the Don by itself, so he waited for Fourth Panzer Army to fight its way north. On 4 August, the Germans were still 97 km (60 mi) from Stalingrad.

By 10 August, the Red Army had been cleared from most of the west bank of the Don, but Soviet resistance continued in some areas, further delaying Army Group B. The Wehrmacht advance on Stalingrad was also impeded by supply shortages caused by the poor state of Soviet roads. The Luftwaffe sent an ad-hoc force of 300 Ju 52 transport aircraft, enabling the Germans to advance; some bombers were diverted from operations to supply flights under the Stalingrad Transport Region force. The Soviet defence at the Don forced the Germans to commit more and more troops to an increasingly vulnerable front, leaving few reserves to back up the Axis divisions on either flank. The Soviets made several counter-attacks on the northern flank of Army Group B, between Stalingrad and Voronezh. From 20–28 August, the 63rd Army and the 21st Army counter-attacked near Serafimovich, forcing the Italian Eighth Army to fall back. The 1st Guards Army attacked near Novo-Grigoryevskaja, extending its bridgehead. These and several other bridgeheads across the Don, opposed by the Eighth Italian and Second Hungarian armies, were a constant danger.

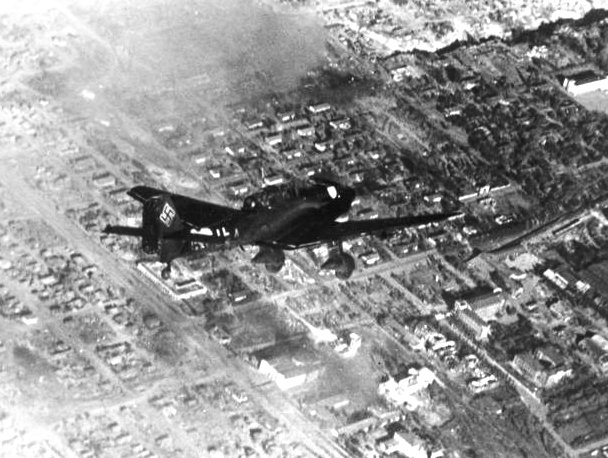
A Ju 87 Stuka dive bomber over Stalingrad

On 23 August, Sixth Army crossed the Don and Army Group B established a defensive line on one of its bends. Sixth Army reached the northern suburbs of Stalingrad later that day, beginning the Battle of Stalingrad. The Hungarian, Italian and Romanian armies were 60 km (37 mi) from Stalingrad, which was in range of forward air bases. Luftflotte 4 attacked the city, turning much of it to rubble. The Soviets reported that civilian casualties from 23–26 August were 955 dead and 1,181 wounded (a preliminary total; later reports of casualties in the tens of thousands were probably exaggerations).

Sixth Army advanced from the north via Kalach and Fourth Panzer Army came up from the south through Kotelnikovo. In the first few days, the XIV Panzer Corps opened a corridor between the main body of Sixth Army and the northern Stalingrad suburbs at the Volga. In the south, Soviet resistance repulsed the Fourth Panzer Army. On 29 August another attempt was made with Hoth turning his forces west directly through the center of 64th Army. The attack was unexpectedly successful and Fourth Panzer Army got behind 62nd and 64th Armies with the chance to encircle and cut off 62nd Army. Weichs ordered Sixth Army to complete the encirclement; a Soviet counter-attack held up the advance for three days and the Soviets escaped and retreated towards Stalingrad. The rapid German advance caused a slump in morale among the Soviet troops, who retreated in chaos, abandoning the outer defences of the city. After defeating the last Soviet counterattacks, Sixth Army resumed its offensive on 2 September, linking up with Fourth Panzer Army the following day. On 12 September, the Germans entered Stalingrad.

==== Battle of Stalingrad ====
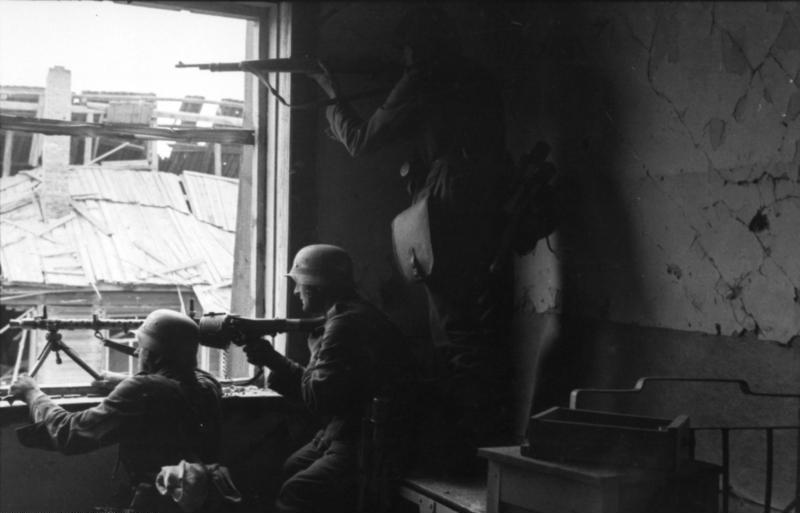
Street fighting in the destroyed city

The advance into Stalingrad against the 62nd Army was carried out by Sixth Army, while Fourth Panzer Army secured the southern flank. The city was a 24 km (15 mi) ribbon along the west bank of the Volga, which forced the Germans to conduct a frontal assault, and the ruins of the city gave the defenders an advantage. To counter Luftwaffe air superiority, the commander of the 62nd Army, General Vasily Chuikov, ordered his troops to "hug" the Germans, negating German tactical mobility. The Luftwaffe suppressed Soviet artillery on the east bank of the Volga and caused many casualties during Soviet attempts to reinforce the defenders on the west bank. From mid-September until early November the Germans made three big attacks on the city and ground forward in mutually-costly fighting. By mid-November, the Soviets were penned into four shallow bridgeheads, with the front line only 180 m (200 yd) from the river. Anticipating victory, substantial numbers of Luftwaffe aircraft were withdrawn to the Mediterranean in early November to support the Axis operations in Tunisia. Sixth Army had captured about 90 percent of the city.

On 19 November, the Soviets launched Operation Uranus, a two-pronged counter-offensive against the flanks of Sixth Army. With the battle for the city and the exhaustion of Fourth Panzer Army, the flanks were mainly guarded by Romanian, Hungarian and Italian soldiers. Third Romanian Army, on the Don River west of Stalingrad, and Fourth Romanian Army, south-east of Stalingrad, had been under constant Soviet attack since September. Third Romanian Army had been transferred from the Caucasus on 10 September to take over Italian positions on the Don, opposite the Soviet bridgeheads. The Romanians were understrength and had only around six modern anti-tank guns per division. The bulk of the German tank reserve, the 48th Panzer Corps, consisted of about 180 tanks, half being obsolete Panzer 35(t)s. The two Romanian armies were routed and Sixth Army with parts of Fourth Panzer Army were encircled in Stalingrad.

Hitler ordered Sixth Army to remain on the defensive, rather than try to break out. It was intended the army would be supplied by air, but the quantity of supplies necessary was far beyond the ability of the Luftwaffe to carry. Sixth Army's strength diminished and the Soviets gained the upper hand inside the city. To stabilize the situation on the Eastern Front, Army Group Don (Heeresgruppe Don) under Field Marshal Erich von Manstein was created to fill the gap between Army Groups A and B. On 12 December, a relief operation called Operation Winter Storm was launched from the South by fresh reinforcements of the 4th Panzer Army. The offensive surprised the Soviets and the Germans were able to penetrate the Soviet line for 50 km (31 mi) towards Stalingrad. Despite these gains, the Sixth Army was not allowed to attempt to break out and link up, so this led to nothing. The failure was followed by a siege that lasted for almost two months, during which the Sixth Army was destroyed.

== Aftermath ==
=== Operation Saturn ===
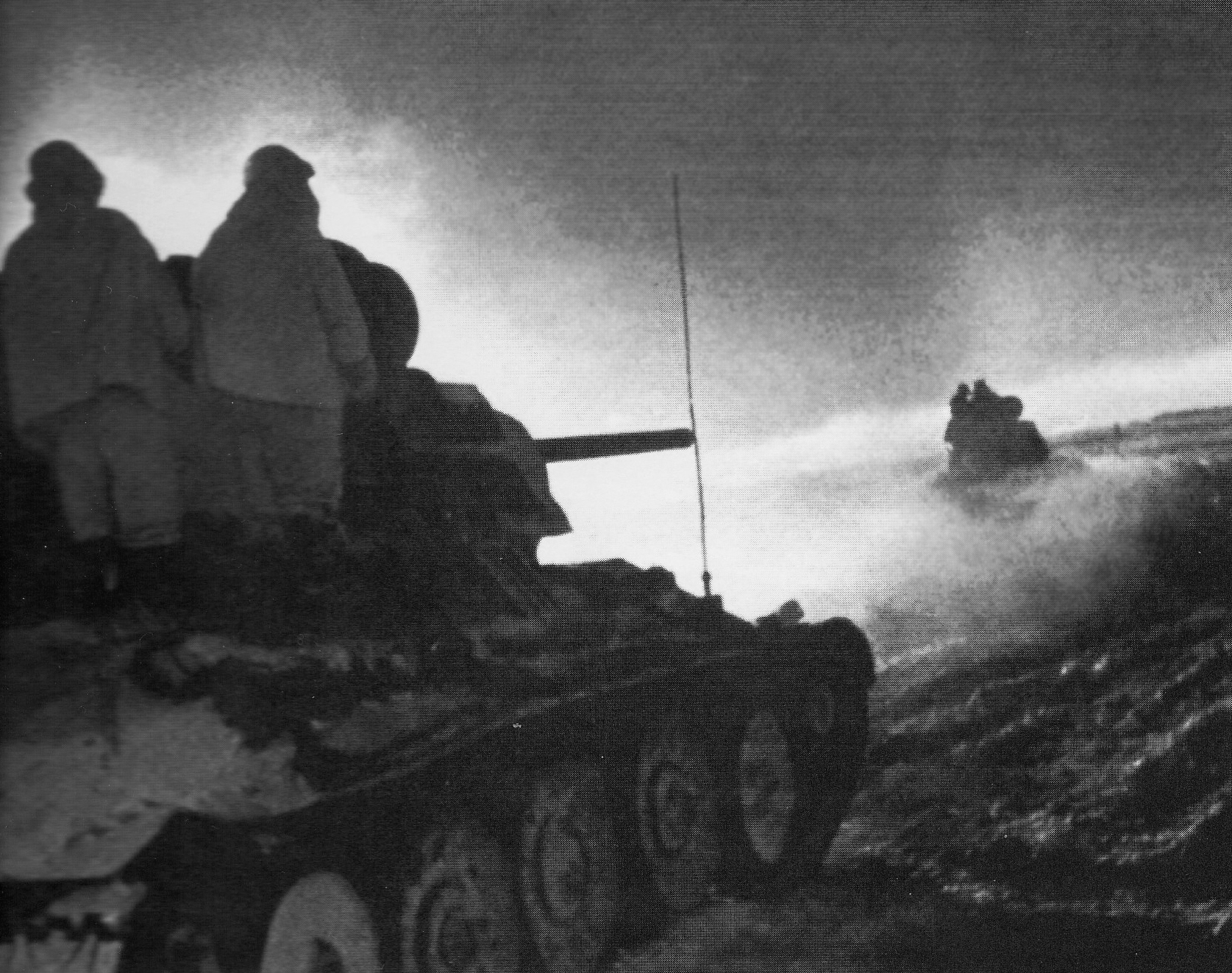
Soviet forces during Operation Little Saturn

Following the success of Operation Uranus, the Red Army began Operation Saturn to cut off Army Group A and all troops east of Rostov. During the German relief operation at Stalingrad, Soviet forces had been redeployed, lesser objectives substituted, and the operation renamed "Little Saturn". The attack fell on Eighth Italian Army and the remnants of Third Romanian Army, and led to the destruction of most of Eighth Army. On the verge of collapse, Army Groups B and Don were able to prevent a Soviet breakthrough but Army Group A was ordered to withdraw from the Caucasus on 28 December.

The Soviets launched several follow-up offensives, later called the Voronezh-Kharkov Strategic Offensive. The Ostrogozhsk–Rossosh Offensive began on 12 January and destroyed large parts of the Second Hungarian Army and the remnants of Eighth Italian Army at the Don south-east of Voronezh. With the southern flank in danger, Second German Army was forced to withdraw from Voronezh and the Don. The operations continued until January and led Stavka to believe that they could deal a fatal blow to the Germans and decide the war in southern Russia. Operation Star, conducted by the Voronezh Front, was aimed at Kharkov, Kursk and Belgorod. Operation Gallop was conducted by the South-western Front against Voroshilovgrad, Donetsk and then towards the Sea of Azov, to cut off the German forces east of Donetsk. The operations began simultaneously at the end of January. The Soviets broke through quickly and in the north, Kursk fell on 18 February and Kharkov on 16 February after a German withdrawal, while in the south the Germans were pushed back to a line west of Voroshilovgrad. Army Groups Don, B and parts of Army Group A (Note: The Seventeenth Army of Army Group A stayed in the Kuban bridgehead.) were renamed Army Group South, commanded by Manstein, on 12 February.

The Kharkov and Donbas operations were started on 25 February by the new Central Front led by Rokossovsky, with the forces freed after the surrender of the Germans in Stalingrad on 2 February. The operations were aimed at Army Group Center in the north and timed to coincide with the expected successes of the Soviet operations in the south. Army Group South escaped encirclement and prepared a counter-offensive, which led to the Third Battle of Kharkov and the stabilization of the front. The disaster at Stalingrad was the end of Case Blue and the territorial gains had been reversed by the end of 1943, except for the Kuban bridgehead on the Taman peninsula, retained for a possible second offensive to the Caucasus, which was held until 19 October 1943.

=== Analysis ===
Due to the initial success of the German summer offensive in 1942, Hitler became more ambitious, putting great strain on the German army. Hitler did not expect the Soviets to be able to launch a counter-offensive as big as Operation Uranus and sent troops elsewhere, ordering the Wehrmacht to simultaneously achieve several goals. Opposition and minor setbacks led to Hitler sacking dissenters and interfering more in command, constantly changing plans and orders, which led to confusion, delays and wastage of precious resources like fuel as the German army struggled to keep up with Hitler's indecisiveness.

Overextension reduced the capabilities of the German Army and its allies to defend this territory and the Soviets mounted a decisive offensive at Stalingrad, encircling a German army. Soon both sides concentrated on the battle for the city, making the Caucasus a secondary theatre. With Army Group B unable to hold the Volga line, Soviet offensives almost cut off Army Group A in the Caucasus and it was forced to withdraw. The surrender of Sixth Army was a huge blow to German morale and it came as a great shock to Hitler. Despite the destruction of Sixth Army, the Soviets were able to only force the German Army back from the Caucasus, delaying the final decision on the Eastern Front. The Soviet command overestimated its capabilities and pushed its forces forward to the limit of its supply lines, which led to defeat at the Third Battle of Kharkov and left the Germans able to fight the Battle of Kursk.

== See also ==
- Oil campaign of World War II
- Operation Braunschweig
- Reichskommissariat Kaukasien
- Operation Barbarossa

== Bibliography ==
- Antill, Peter (2007). Stalingrad 1942. Oxford: Osprey Publishing. ISBN 978-1-84603-028-4.
- Axworthy, Mark (September–October 1999). "Flank Guard: Romania's Advance on Stalingrad, Part Two". Air Enthusiast (65): 72–75. ISSN 0143-5450.
- Axworthy, Mark; Scafes, Cornel; Craciunoiu, Cristian (1995). Third Axis Fourth Ally: Romanian Armed Forces in the European War, 1941–1945. London: Arms & Armour Press. ISBN 1-85409-267-7.
- Beevor, Antony (1999). Stalingrad: The Fateful Siege: 1942–1943. London: Penguin Books. ISBN 0-14-028458-3.
- Bellamy, Chris (2007). Absolute War: Soviet Russia in the Second World War. London: Pan Books. ISBN 978-0-330-48808-2.
- Bergström, Christer (2007). Stalingrad – The Air Battle: November 1942 – February 1943. London: Chevron/Ian Allan. ISBN 978-1-85780-276-4.
- Forczyk, Robert (2021). Stalingrad 1942–43 (I): The German Advance to the Volga. Oxford: Osprey. ISBN 978-1-47284-265-7.
- Glantz, David M.; House, Jonathan M. (2009). To the Gates of Stalingrad: Soviet-German Combat Operations, April–August 1942. The Stalingrad Trilogy. Vol. I. Lawrence: University Press of Kansas. ISBN 978-0-7006-1630-5.
- Glantz, David M. (1995). When Titans Clashed: How the Red Army Stopped Hitler. Lawrence: University Press of Kansas. ISBN 0-7006-0899-0.
- Hayward, Joel (1995). Too Little Too Late: An Analysis of Hitler's Failure in 1942 to Damage Soviet Oil Production. Lawrence, KS: The Journal of Strategic Studies, Vol. 18, No. 4, pp. 94–135.
- Hayward, Joel (2001). Stopped at Stalingrad: The Luftwaffe and Hitler's Defeat in the East, 1942–1943. Lawrence: University Press of Kansas. ISBN 0-7006-1146-0.
- Holt, David (June 2009). "The Slovak Army: 1939–1945 Part 2: The Russian Campaign 1940–43" (PDF). Journal of the Czechoslovak Philatelic Society of Great Britain. 27 (2). ISSN 0142-3525.
- Javrishvili K., Battle of Caucasus: Case for Georgian Alpinists, Translated by Michael P. Willis, 2017.
- Liddell Hart, Basil Henry (1948). The German Generals Talk. New York: Morrow. ISBN 0688060129.
- Liedtke, Gregory (2016). Enduring the Whirlwind: The German Army and the Russo-German War 1941–1943. Helion and Company. ISBN 978-0-313-39592-5.
- Mercatante, Steven (2012). Why Germany Nearly Won: A New History of the Second World War in Europe. Praeger. ISBN 978-1910777756.
- Nipe, George M. Jr. (2000). Last Victory in Russia: The SS-Panzerkorps and Manstein's Kharkov Counteroffensive – February–March 1943. Atglen, PA: Schiffer Publishing. ISBN 0-7643-1186-7.
- Schramm, Percy Ernst (1963). Kriegstagebuch des Oberkommandos der Wehrmacht, 1940–1945 Teilband II. Bonn: Bernard & Graefe Verlag für Wehrwesen.
- Wegner, Bernd (1990). "Der Krieg gegen die Sowjetunion 1942/1943 [The war against the Soviet Union 1942/43]". In Boog, Horst; Rahn, Werner; Stumpf, Reinhard; Wegner, Bernd (eds.). Der globale Krieg: Die Ausweitung zum Weltkrieg und der Wechsel zur Initiative 1941 bis 1943 [The Global War: The expansion of the war into a world war and the change of initiative]. Germany and the Second World War (in German). Vol. VI. Militärgeschichtliches Forschungsamt. Deutsche Verlags-Anstalt. pp. 761–1094. ISBN 3-421-06233-1.
