= Bezrechnaya-2 (air base) =

Airport in Zabaykalsky Krai, Russia

Bezrechnaya-2
- Borzya, Zabaykalsky Krai in Russia
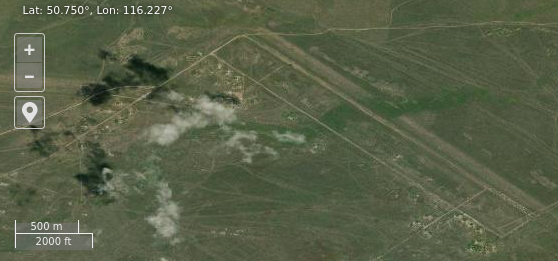
- Satellite imagery of the former Bezrechnaya-2 air base

Site information
- Type: Air Base
- Owner: Ministry of Defence
- Operator: Russian Air Force

Location
- Shown within Zabaykalsky Krai Bezrechnaya-2 (Russia)
- Coordinates: 50°45′0″N 116°13′41″E

Site history
- In use: Unknown

Airfield information
- Identifiers: ICAO: XIAJ
- Elevation: 671 metres (2,201 ft) AMSL
Runways
Direction	Length and surface
13/31	2,500 metres (8,202 ft) Concrete

Bezrechnaya-2 (also given variously as Bezrechnaya, Bezrechnoy, Khodabulak, Khada Bulak North, or Mirnaya) was an interceptor aircraft base in Chita Oblast, Russia. It featured a linear ramp.

It was located 28 miles (45 km) north of Borzya and 7.4 miles (11.9 km) east of Mirnaya.

The base has been home to:

- 22 IAP (22nd Fighter Aviation Regiment) flying Sukhoi Su-15TM aircraft from 1971 to 1992. The regiment was subordinate to 50th Guards Air Defence Corps of the 14th Air Defence Army from 1988 to 1992.
- OSAZ (unidentified) (Independent Composite Aviation Regiment) flying Su-15TM. This may be an erroneous identification of 22 IAP listed above.

== See also ==
- List of military airbases in Russia
