= Feofan Parkhomenko =

Soviet Army lieutenant general

Feofan Agapovich Parkhomenko
- Parkhomenko in the late 1930s
- Born: 24 December 1893; Yekaterinovka village, Medvezhensky Uyezd, Stavropol Governorate, Russian Empire
- Died: 7 June 1962 (aged 68) Saratov, Soviet Union
- Allegiance: Russian Empire; Russian SFSR; Soviet Union
- Branch: Imperial Russian Army; Red Army (later Soviet Army)
- Service years: 1914–1917; 1918–1954
- Rank: Lieutenant general
- Commands: 210th Motorized Division; 60th Cavalry Division; Separate Cavalry Corps (became 1st Cavalry Corps); 5th Cavalry Corps; 9th Army; 18th Cavalry Corps; 87th Rifle Corps; 125th Rifle Corps
- Conflicts: World War I; Russian Civil War; Polish–Soviet War; Sino-Soviet conflict; World War II
- Awards: Order of Lenin (2); Order of the Red Banner (4); Order of Kutuzov, 2nd class; Order of the Red Star

Feofan Agapovich Parkhomenko (Russian: Феофан Агапович Пархоменко; 24 December 1893 – 7 June 1962) was a Soviet Army lieutenant general.

He fought in the Caucasus campaign of World War I and rose from private to ensign in the Imperial Russian Army. Parkhomenko joined the Red Army during the Russian Civil War, serving with cavalry units, and ended the war as a regimental commander. During the interwar period, he continued to hold regimental command, but was arrested and imprisoned during the Great Purge. Reinstated in the army, Parkhomenko commanded a motorized division in Belarus at the outbreak of Operation Barbarossa. After his division suffered heavy losses in the first weeks of the war, he was sent to the North Caucasus and led a cavalry corps in the Barvenkovo–Lozovaya Offensive of early 1942. During that year, Parkhomenko commanded another cavalry corps and the 9th Army in the early stages of the Battle of the Caucasus, then served as an army deputy commander during the Battle of Stalingrad. He spent most of 1943 in the Soviet Far East as a corps commander and returned to command a corps in northwestern Ukraine in early 1944, but was relieved of command. Parkhomenko never held a command again and spent the rest of the war as an army deputy commander before retiring in the early 1950s.

== Early life, World War I, and Russian Civil War ==
Parkhomenko was born to a peasant family on 24 December 1893 in the village of Yekaterinovka, Stavropol Governorate. He graduated from primary school and was drafted into the Imperial Russian Army in September 1914 during World War I. Parkhomenko was sent to the Caucasus front, where he served with the 13th Turkestan Rifle Regiment of the 4th Turkestan Rifle Division, initially as a ryadovoy. There he graduated from the regimental training detachment in 1915 and served as a yefreytor, junior and senior unter-ofitser, and feldfebel. In June 1916 Parkhomenko graduated from a warrant officers school and became a podpraporshchik. After the Russian Revolution, he was demobilized in December 1917 with the rank of praporshchik.

Parkhomenko returned to his home village and in January 1918 organized a Soviet partisan self-defense detachment from villagers of Yekaterinovka, Shablievka, and Manychskaya. In July the detachment was absorbed into the Red Army and he was appointed assistant commander of the 1st Don-Stavropol Brigade, fighting in the Battle of Tsaritsyn. From October 1918 Parkhomenko commanded a squadron of the 21st Don-Stavropol Regiment of the 4th Cavalry Division, then became assistant commander and commander of the regiment. With the 4th Cavalry Division, which became part of the 1st Cavalry Army, he fought in battles against the Armed Forces of South Russia on the Southern Front and in the Polish–Soviet War on the Southwestern Front.

== Interwar period ==
Parkhomenko entered the Higher Cavalry School at Taganrog in May 1921, graduating in September 1924 after the school relocated to Petrograd in October 1922. After graduation, he returned to the 4th Cavalry Division to command its 19th Manych Cavalry Regiment. Transferred to Izyaslav to command the 9th Putilov Cavalry Regiment of the 2nd Cavalry Division in December 1925, he was discharged to the reserve in July 1926. Out of the army, he became chief of the militsiya of Shepetovsky Okrug.

Redrafted into the army in February 1927, Parkhomenko was appointed commander of the 87th Transbaikal Cavalry Regiment of the 9th Far Eastern Separate Cavalry Brigade in Spassk, commanding the regiment in the Sino-Soviet conflict of 1929. He graduated from the Novocherkassk Cavalry Officers Improvement Course (KUKS) in 1929 and the Higher Academic Course at the Frunze Military Academy in 1930. Parkhomenko was arrested in July 1931, dismissed from the army, and put under investigation. He was sentenced to three years in prison by the Military Collegium of the Supreme Court of the Soviet Union for "failure to comply with orders of the Revolutionary Military Council and [military] district on the especially careful storage of weapons", but was amnestied in October.

Placed at the disposal of the Main Personnel Directorate and seconded to the staff of the Special Red Banner Far Eastern Army, Parkhomenko became commander of the 74th Cavalry Regiment of the 15th Cavalry Division at Dauriya in March 1932, then served as assistant commander and acting commander of the 22nd Cavalry Division at Khada Bulak from July 1936. Investigated by the NKVD and held in a remand prison between 21 October 1938 and 7 December 1939 as an "enemy of the people" during the Great Purge, due to a lack of evidence for his guilt Parkhomenko was exonerated and in March 1940 appointed assistant commander of the 4th Cavalry Division, now part of the Western Special Military District. He was promoted to kombrig on 31 March. When the 4th Cavalry Division was used to form the 20th Mechanized Corps in March 1941, Parkhomenko became commander of the corps' 210th Motorized Division.

== World War II ==
After the beginning of Operation Barbarossa, the German invasion of the Soviet Union, on 22 June 1941, Parkhomenko led the division in the Battle of Białystok–Minsk as part of the 13th Army of the Western Front. It fought in the Battle of Smolensk from 10 July, and from 24 July as part of the Central Front, then the Bryansk Front from 15 August fought in defense battles on the Sozh, Sudost, and Desna Rivers. On 7 August Parkhomenko belatedly received the rank of major general, more than a year after the rank of kombrig had been replaced.

Transferred to the North Caucasus Military District to temporarily command the 60th Cavalry Division of the 57th Army in September, Parkhomenko was appointed commander of the Separate Cavalry Corps in December. The corps was redesignated as the 1st Cavalry Corps on 14 January 1942 and with the 18th Army of the Southern Front fought in attacks near Izyum and the Barvenkovo–Lozovaya Offensive. During the latter, the corps, advancing in the direction of the front's main thrust, recaptured Barvenkovo and other fortified points. After the corps was disbanded, Parkhomenko became deputy commander of the 38th Army of the Southwestern Front in June. From July he commanded the 5th Cavalry Corps of the 9th Army, leading it in the repulse of German attacks in the Donbas and the Don bend.

Parkhomenko commanded the 9th Army of the Southern Front between 14 July and 7 August, then became deputy commander of the 24th Army of the Stavka reserve. With the army he fought in the Battle of Stalingrad, and in March 1943 was transferred to the Far Eastern Front to command the 18th Cavalry Corps, covering the Soviet-Japanese border. He continued to command the corps until 16 November after it became the 87th Rifle Corps in August, then was sent west to command the 125th Rifle Corps of the 47th Army of the 2nd Belorussian Front in northwestern Ukraine from 16 January. On 6 May 1944, Parkhomenko was relieved of corps command for "inactivity and inability to skillfully organize defense and control the battle" after a German counterattack at Kovel inflicted heavy losses on the corps. He subsequently served as deputy commander of the corps, and from September was deputy commander of the 70th Army. With the latter, he participated in the East Prussian Offensive, the East Pomeranian Offensive, and the Berlin Offensive. Just before the end of the war, Parkhomenko was promoted to lieutenant general on 20 April 1945.

== Postwar ==
After the disbandment of the 70th Army, Parkhomenko was placed at the disposal of the Main Personnel Directorate to await a new assignment. This became in January 1946 when he was appointed deputy commander of the 43rd Army of the Northern Group of Forces. However, Parkhomenko was again placed at the disposal of the Ground Forces Cadre Directorate in August 1946 after the 43rd Army was disbanded and in February 1947 became military commissar of Saratov Oblast. He retired from active duty in July 1954 and died in Saratov on 7 June 1962.

== Awards and honors ==
Parkhomenko was a recipient of the following decorations:

- Order of Lenin (2)
- Order of the Red Banner (4)
- Order of Kutuzov, 2nd class
- Order of the Red Star
