= Khada Bulak =

- IATA: none; ICAO: none

Summary
- Airport type: Military
- Location: Sherlovaya Gora
- Elevation AMSL: 2,339 ft / 713 m
- Coordinates: 50°36′0″N 116°23′0″E

Map
- Location in Far Eastern Federal District Khada Bulak (Russia)

Runways
Direction	Length		Surface
Direction	ft	m	Surface
	9,514	2,900

Khada Bulak is a former air base in Chita Oblast, Russia located 9 km northeast of Sherlovaya Gora. Almost no trace remains of the former airfield. It also is located near Bezrechnaya-2, which is sometimes referred to as Khada Bulak.
