= Grozny oil field =

Soviet oil-industrial region

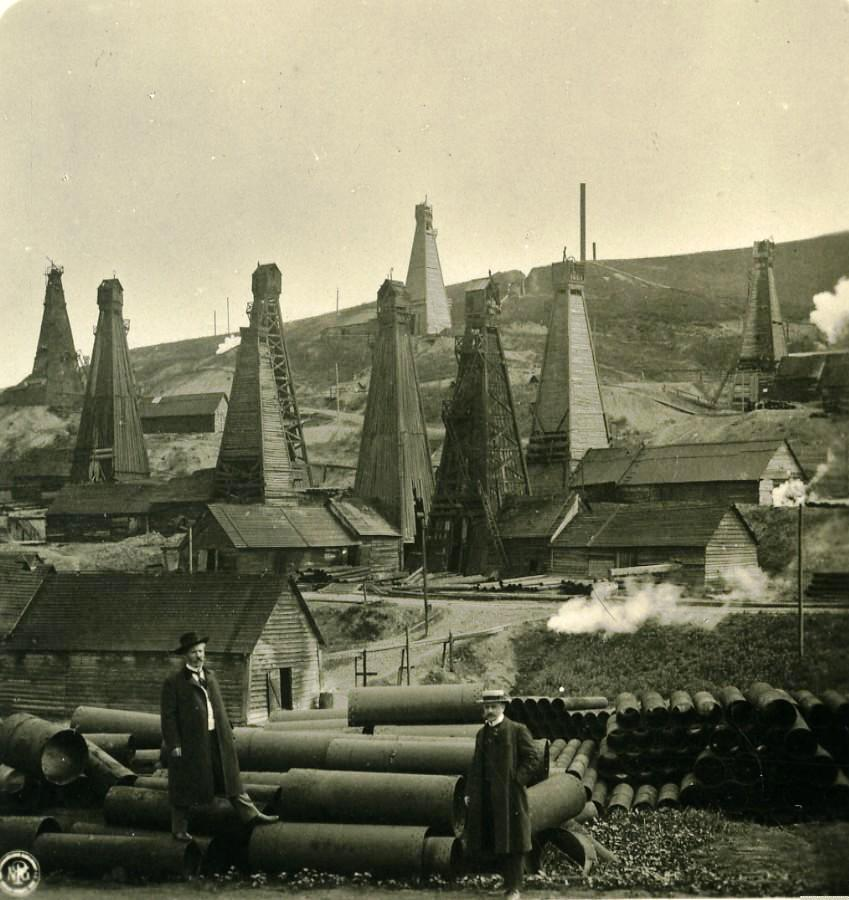
Oil fields in Grozny, 1905

Grozny oil field was one of the largest oil-industrial regions in the territory of the Russian Empire and then the USSR.

Oil seeps to the surface of the earth in the North Caucasus were noticed long before the beginning of the industrial development of oil fields on the slopes of the relatively low Tersky and Sunzhensky ridges. Since ancient times, local residents have collected oil here, which was used for household needs, medical and military purposes. They lubricated the axes of the supply with oil, treated people and animals, burned it in lamps, etc. In the 19th century, a whole group of deposits was found on the Grozny Range. Oil was extracted from wells no deeper than two arshins, from which it was simply scooped out with a bucket. Since 1811, oil wells have been farmed out. Such a farmer was originally the Mozdok Regiment, and since 1838, all oil sources have become the property of the Caucasian line troops. This army rented oil wells to merchant farmers, wealthy Cossacks, and other entrepreneurs. From 1833 to 1860, about 140 thousand pounds of oil were mastered in this way.

Oil production, which at that time was carried out by artisanal methods, peaked in 1885 at 77,000 poods (1 pood = 16.3 kg). Scientists have undertaken a serious study of Grozny oil. Among them was the outstanding Russian chemist, D. I. Mendeleev. The industrial development of the Grozny oil region began. In 1892, 450,000 barrels of oil were produced. Grozny fisheries occupied second place in terms of productivity in the country.

== Description ==
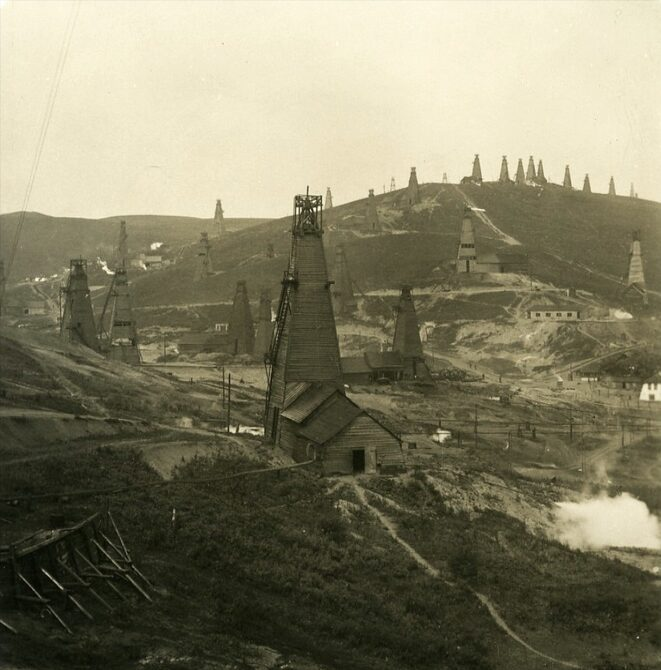
Oil fields in Grozny, 1905

The Grozny region of oil and gas fields is part of the North Caucasian oil and gas region of Russia. Oil-bearing areas are concentrated in the areas of the Sunzha and Tersky ridges and the Black Mountains. The Grozny region, along with the Baku region, was one of the first oil-producing regions of the USSR. The beginning of industrial oil production was laid back in 1893, when the first fountain of oil gushed from a depth of more than 130 meters in the Starogroznensky district. Over the century-long history of the industry, 420 million tons of oil have been extracted from the bowels of the earth.

The largest deposits are: Novogroznenskoye (Oktyabrskoye) and Starogroznenskoye (with the oil-bearing areas of Tashkala and Salt Balka). Oil fields approach anticlinal folds, usually overturned and complicated by ruptures. The main oil deposits belong to the sandstones of the productive strata of the Karagan and Chokrak horizons of the Middle Miocene. Oil is paraffinic, with a high content of light fractions (in particular, gasoline). Geological exploration of the Grozny oil-bearing region began in the second half of the 19th century, and industrial production began in the 1890s. At the end of the 19th century, 7 English companies with a capital of 11 million rubles established themselves in the Grozny oil-industrial region, relegating the French Rothschilds, who had previously occupied a leading position among foreign firms, to the background. In 1913, the Novogroznenskoye field was discovered. The main owners of the Grozny oil fields were the world's largest oil companies and concerns: Nobel, Shell, Oil, Tweedy-Andreis, etc. By 1914, in the oil industry on the territory of the Grozny oil-bearing region, in percentage terms: English 36%, Russian 27%, French 18%, Belgian 10%, Dutch 9%. During the years of Soviet power, the largest fields were put into operation: in 1934, Malgobekneft; in 1937, Goragorskoye; in 1941, Oysungur; and in 1945, Tashkala. Checheno-Ingushetia was the second oil center of the USSR after Azerbaijan (the average oil production by the beginning of the Second World War was from 3 to 4 million tons annually, and its explored reserves amounted to 1.5 billion).

== Gallery ==
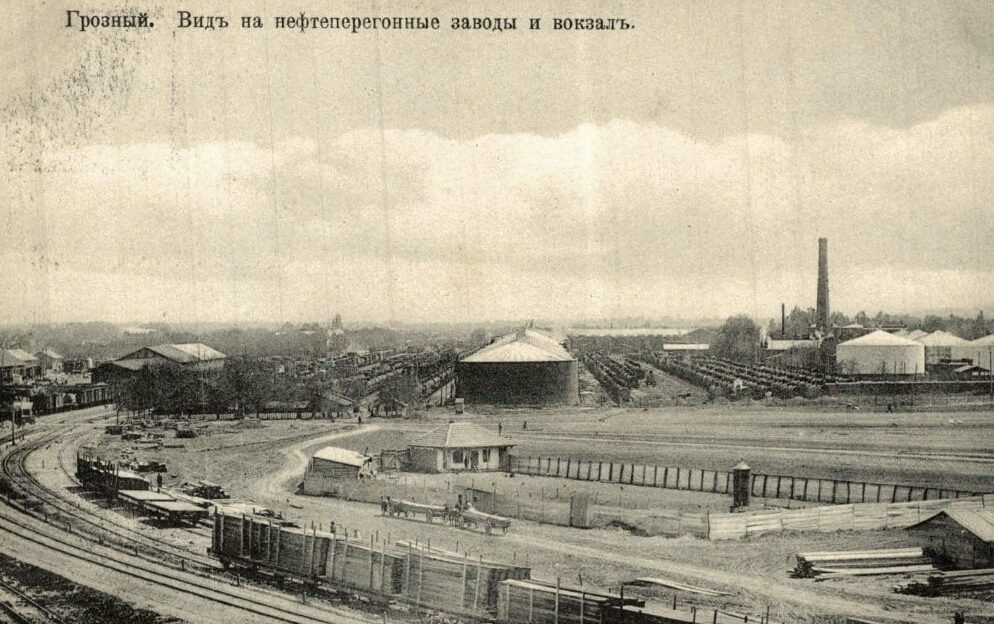
Grozny. View of the refineries and the railway station. 1910-1915

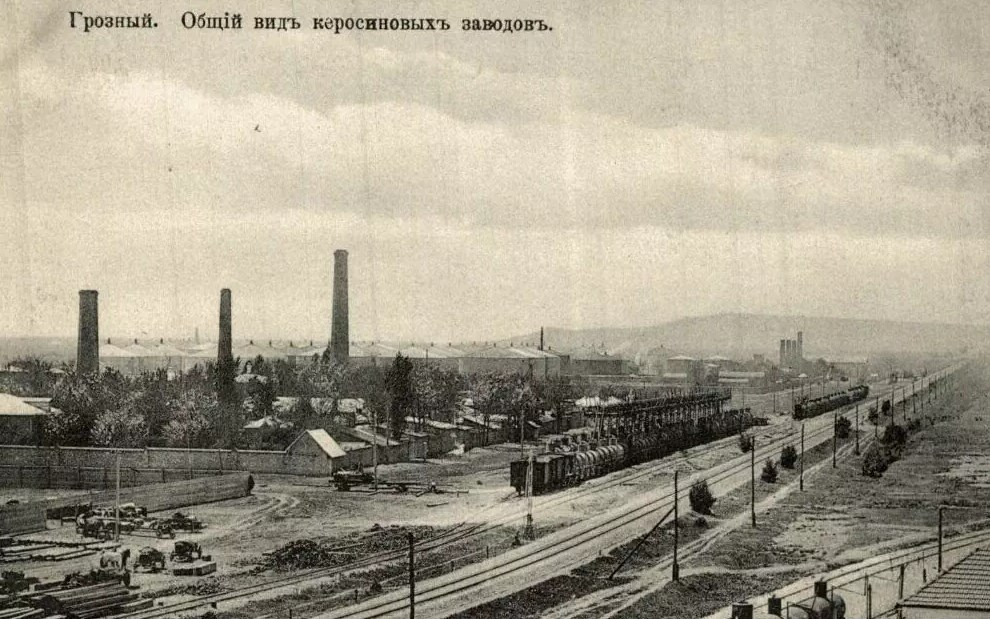
Grozny. General view of the kerosene plants. 1910s

== See also ==
- Chechnya
