= List of ship launches in 1955 =

The list of ship launches in 1955 includes a chronological list of all ships launched in 1955.

Date	Ship	Class / type	Builder	Location	Country	Notes
3 January	Pinnacle	Aggressive-class minesweeper	Higgins Industries	New Orleans, Louisiana	United States	For United States Navy
11 January	Riplingham	Ham-class minesweeper	Brooke Marine Ltd.	Lowestoft	United Kingdom	For Royal Navy.
12 January	Stedham	Ham-class minesweeper	M. W. Blackmore & Sons Ltd.	Bideford	United Kingdom	For Royal Navy.
26 January	Hickleton	Ton-class minesweeper	John I. Thornycroft & Company	Southampton, England	United Kingdom	For Royal Navy
January	L.C.D. & T. Co. No. 108	Barge	Alabama Drydock and Shipbuilding Company	Mobile, Alabama	United States	For Lake Charles Dredging.
January	L.C.D. & T. Co. No. 109	Barge	Alabama Drydock and Shipbuilding Company	Mobile, Alabama	United States	For Lake Charles Dredging.
1 February	Wappen von Hamburg	Seebäderschiff	Blohm & Voss	Hamburg	West Germany	For HADAG
5 February	Forrest Sherman	Forrest Sherman-class destroyer	Bath Iron Works	Bath, Maine	United States	For United States Navy, first in class
22 February	Murray	Blackwood-class frigate	Alexander Stephen and Sons	Glasgow, Scotland	United Kingdom	For Royal Navy
25 February	Helsingør	Ferry	Helsingør Skipsværft og Maskinbyggeri A/S+	Helsingør	Denmark	For DSB
February	SK-207	Barge	Alabama Drydock and Shipbuilding Company	Mobile, Alabama	United States	For International Paper Co.
February	SK-208	Barge	Alabama Drydock and Shipbuilding Company	Mobile, Alabama	United States	For International Paper Co.
February	SK-209	Barge	Alabama Drydock and Shipbuilding Company	Mobile, Alabama	United States	For International Paper Co.
2 March	Leverton	Ton-class minesweeper	Harland & Wolff	Belfast	United Kingdom	For Royal Navy.
10 March	Truckee	Neosho-class oiler	New York Shipbuilding	Camden, New Jersey	United States	For United States Navy
10 March	Port Melbourne	Refrigerated cargo ship	Harland & Wolff	Belfast	United Kingdom	For Port Line.
24 March	Foylebank	Cargo ship	Harland & Wolff	Belfast	United Kingdom	For Bank Line.
March	SK 210	Barge	Alabama Drydock and Shipbuilding Company	Mobile, Alabama	United States	For International Paper Co.
21 April	Chichester	Salisbury-class frigate	Fairfield Shipbuilding	Glasgow, Scotland	United Kingdom	For Royal Navy
21 April	Manicougan	Bulk Carrier	Atlantic Shipbuilding Co. Ltd	Newport	United Kingdom	For Quebec & Ontario Transportation Co. Ltd.
21 April	Triaster	Cargo ship	Harland & Wolff	Belfast	United Kingdom	For British Phosphate Carriers.
23 April	Persistent	Aggressive-class minesweeper	J. M. Martinac Shipbuilding	Tacoma, Washington	United States	For United States Navy
24 April	Murmansk	Sverdlov-class cruiser		Severodvinsk	Soviet Union	For Soviet Navy
26 April	Ulster Premier	Coaster	Harland & Wolff	Belfast	United Kingdom	For Belfast Steamship Co.
April	SK 211	Barge	Alabama Drydock and Shipbuilding Company	Mobile, Alabama	United States	For International Paper Co.
5 May	Vibex	Tanker	Harland & Wolff	Belfast	United Kingdom	For Shell Oil Co.
7 May	John Paul Jones	Forrest Sherman-class destroyer	Bath Iron Works	Bath, Maine	United States	For United States Navy
23 May	Kildarton	Ton-class minesweeper	Harland & Wolff	Belfast	United Kingdom	For Royal Navy.
May	ADDSCO 553	Hopper barge	Alabama Drydock and Shipbuilding Company	Mobile, Alabama	United States	For Alabama Drydock and Shipbuilding Company.
May	ADDSCO 554	Hopper barge	Alabama Drydock and Shipbuilding Company	Mobile, Alabama	United States	For Alabama Drydock and Shipbuilding Company.
May	ADDSCO 555	Hopper barge	Alabama Drydock and Shipbuilding Company	Mobile, Alabama	United States	For Alabama Drydock and Shipbuilding Company.
7 June	Reina del Mar	Passenger ship	Harland & Wolff	Belfast	United Kingdom	For Pacific Steam Navigation Company.
11 June	Uthlande	Ferry	Husumer Schiffswerft GmbH	Husum	West Germany	For Wyker Dampfschiffs-Reederei Amrum GmbH
15 June	Pioner	Fishing trawler	Brooke Marine Ltd.	Lowestoft	United Kingdom	For private owner.
21 June	Talinga	Bulk carrier	Blyth Dry Docks & Shipbuilding Co. Ltd	Blyth, Northumberland	United Kingdom	For Australian Government.
21 June	Terra Nova	Restigouche-class destroyer	Victoria Machinery Depot	Victoria, British Columbia	Canada	For Royal Canadian Navy
22 June	Empress of Britain	Ocean liner	Fairfield Shipbuilding	Govan	United Kingdom	For Canadian Pacific Steamship
23 June	Acme	Acme-class minesweeper	Frank L. Sample Shipyard	Boothbay Harbor, Maine	United States	For United States Navy
June	ADDSCO 556	Hopper barge	Alabama Drydock and Shipbuilding Company	Mobile, Alabama	United States	For Alabama Drydock and Shipbuilding Company.
June	ADDSCO 557	Hopper barge	Alabama Drydock and Shipbuilding Company	Mobile, Alabama	United States	For Alabama Drydock and Shipbuilding Company.
June	ADDSCO 559	Hopper barge	Alabama Drydock and Shipbuilding Company	Mobile, Alabama	United States	For Alabama Drydock and Shipbuilding Company.
June	SK 212	Barge	Alabama Drydock and Shipbuilding Company	Mobile, Alabama	United States	For International Paper Co.
June	SK 213	Barge	Alabama Drydock and Shipbuilding Company	Mobile, Alabama	United States	For International Paper Co.
June	SK 214	Barge	Alabama Drydock and Shipbuilding Company	Mobile, Alabama	United States	For International Paper Co.
5 July	Escalante	Cargo ship	Harland & Wolff	Belfast	United Kingdom	For Royal Mail Line.
5 July	Laganbank	Cargo ship	Harland & Wolff	Belfast	United Kingdom	For Bank Line.
6 July	Harpula	Tanker	Harland & Wolff	Belfast	United Kingdom	For Shell Oil Co.
14 July	Shipham	Ham-class minesweeper	Brooke Marine Ltd.	Lowestoft	United Kingdom	For Royal Navy.
20 July	Pledge	Aggressive-class minesweeper	J. M. Martinac Shipbuilding	Tacoma, Washington	United States	For United States Navy
21 July	Seawolf	Unique nuclear-powered submarine	Electric Boat	Groton, Connecticut	United States	For United States Navy
July	D-202	Barge	Alabama Drydock and Shipbuilding Company	Mobile, Alabama	United States	For Dixie Carriers Inc.
July	D-203	Barge	Alabama Drydock and Shipbuilding Company	Mobile, Alabama	United States	For Dixie Carriers Inc.
July	SK 215	Barge	Alabama Drydock and Shipbuilding Company	Mobile, Alabama	United States	For International Paper Co.
4 August	Dolius	Cargo ship	Harland & Wolff	Belfast	United Kingdom	For Blue Funnel Line.
4 August	Inazuma	Ikazuchi-class destroyer escort			Japan	For Japanese Navy
18 August	Santon	Ton-class minesweeper	Fleetlands Shipyard	Portsmouth, England	United Kingdom	For Royal Navy
20 August	Adroit	Acme-class minesweeper	Frank L. Sample Shipyard	Boothbay Harbor, Maine	United States	For United States Navy
20 August	Yukikaze	Harukaze-class destroyer			Japan	For Japanese Navy
26 August	Cowrie	Hopper ship	Brooke Marine Ltd.	Lowestoft	United Kingdom	For Queensland Government.
31 August	Lullington	Ton-class minesweeper	Harland & Wolff	Belfast	United Kingdom	For Royal Navy.
August	Humble 174	Barge	Alabama Drydock and Shipbuilding Company	Mobile, Alabama	United States	For Humble Oil & Refining Co.
August	Humble 175	Barge	Alabama Drydock and Shipbuilding Company	Mobile, Alabama	United States	For Humble Oil & Refining Co.
August	Humble 176	Barge	Alabama Drydock and Shipbuilding Company	Mobile, Alabama	United States	For Humble Oil & Refining Co.
August	Humble 177	Barge	Alabama Drydock and Shipbuilding Company	Mobile, Alabama	United States	For Humble Oil & Refining Co.
August	Humble 178	Barge	Alabama Drydock and Shipbuilding Company	Mobile, Alabama	United States	For Humble Oil & Refining Co.
August	Humble 179	Barge	Alabama Drydock and Shipbuilding Company	Mobile, Alabama	United States	For Humble Oil & Refining Co.
August	SK 216	Barge	Alabama Drydock and Shipbuilding Company	Mobile, Alabama	United States	For International Paper Co.
6 September	Ikazuchi	Ikazuchi-class destroyer escort			Japan	For Japanese Navy, first in class
8 September	Sailfish	Sailfish-class submarine	Portsmouth Naval Shipyard	Kittery, Maine	United States	For United States Navy, first in class
14 September	Evans	Dealey-class destroyer escort	Puget Sound Bridge and Dredging Company	Seattle, Washington	United States	For United States Navy
17 September	Pulonga	Fishing trawler	Brooke Marine Ltd.	Lowestoft	United Kingdom	For private owner.
20 September	Harukaze	Harukaze-class destroyer			Japan	For Japanese Navy, first in class
September	GR Co. No. 0822	Barge	Alabama Drydock and Shipbuilding Company	Mobile, Alabama	United States	For Gulf Refining Company.
September	Humble 180	Barge	Alabama Drydock and Shipbuilding Company	Mobile, Alabama	United States	For Humble Oil & Refining Co.
September	Humble 181	Barge	Alabama Drydock and Shipbuilding Company	Mobile, Alabama	United States	For Humble Oil & Refining Co.
September	Humble 182	Barge	Alabama Drydock and Shipbuilding Company	Mobile, Alabama	United States	For Humble Oil & Refining Co.
September	Humble 183	Barge	Alabama Drydock and Shipbuilding Company	Mobile, Alabama	United States	For Humble Oil & Refining Co.
September	Humble 184	Barge	Alabama Drydock and Shipbuilding Company	Mobile, Alabama	United States	For Humble Oil & Refining Co.
September	Humble 185	Barge	Alabama Drydock and Shipbuilding Company	Mobile, Alabama	United States	For Humble Oil & Refining Co.
September	Humble 186	Barge	Alabama Drydock and Shipbuilding Company	Mobile, Alabama	United States	For Humble Oil & Refining Co.
September	Humble 187	Barge	Alabama Drydock and Shipbuilding Company	Mobile, Alabama	United States	For Humble Oil & Refining Co.
September	Humble 188	Barge	Alabama Drydock and Shipbuilding Company	Mobile, Alabama	United States	For Humble Oil & Refining Co.
September	Humble 189	Barge	Alabama Drydock and Shipbuilding Company	Mobile, Alabama	United States	For Humble Oil & Refining Co.
September	Humble 190	Barge	Alabama Drydock and Shipbuilding Company	Mobile, Alabama	United States	For Humble Oil & Refining Co.
September	Humble 191	Barge	Alabama Drydock and Shipbuilding Company	Mobile, Alabama	United States	For Humble Oil & Refining Co.
September	Humble 192	Barge	Alabama Drydock and Shipbuilding Company	Mobile, Alabama	United States	For Humble Oil & Refining Co.
September	Humble 193	Barge	Alabama Drydock and Shipbuilding Company	Mobile, Alabama	United States	For Humble Oil & Refining Co.
September	Humble 805	Barge	Alabama Drydock and Shipbuilding Company	Mobile, Alabama	United States	For Humble Oil & Refining Co.
1 October	Barry	Forrest Sherman-class destroyer	Bath Iron Works	Bath, Maine	United States	For United States Navy
3 October	Belton	Ton-class minesweeper	Doigs Shipyard	Grimsby, England	United Kingdom	For Royal Navy
4 October	Blackwood	Blackwood-class frigate	John I. Thornycroft & Company	Southampton, England	United Kingdom	For Royal Navy, first in class
8 October	Saratoga	Forrestal-class aircraft carrier	New York Navy Yard	Brooklyn, New York	United States	For United States Navy
13 October	Rendlesham	Ham-class minesweeper	Brooke Marine Ltd.	Lowestoft	United Kingdom	For Royal Navy.
18 October	Malcolm	Blackwood-class frigate	Yarrow Shipbuilders	Glasgow, Scotland	United Kingdom	For Royal Navy
19 October	Eden	Refrigerated cargo ship	Harland & Wolff	Belfast	United Kingdom	For Royal Mail Line.
20 October	Muskun	Fishing trawler	Brooke Marine Ltd.	Lowestoft	United Kingdom	For private owner.
24 October	Essex Ferry	Train ferry	John Brown and Company	Clydebank, Scotland	United Kingdom	For British Transport Commission
26 October	Nordstjernen	Passenger ship	Blohm & Voss	Hamburg	West Germany	For Det Bergenske Dampskibsselskab
30 October	Akebono	Unique destroyer escort			Japan	For Japanese Navy
October	L.C.D. & T. Co. No. 110	Barge	Alabama Drydock and Shipbuilding Company	Mobile, Alabama	United States	For Lake Charles Dredging.
2 November	Courtney	Dealey-class destroyer escort	Defoe Shipbuilding Company	Bay City, Michigan	United States	For United States Navy
2 November	Suribachi	Suribachi-class ammunition ship	Bethlehem Steel	Sparrows Point, Maryland	United States	For United States Navy, first in class
10 November	Spiegel Grove	Thomaston-class dock landing ship	Ingalls Shipbuilding	Pascagoula, Mississippi	United States	For United States Navy
15 November	Confiance	Confiance-class tug	Harland & Wolff	Belfast	United Kingdom	For Royal Navy.
16 November	Exmouth	Blackwood-class frigate	J. Samuel White	Cowes, Isle of Wight	United Kingdom	For Royal Navy
16 November	Southern Prince	Cargo ship	Harland & Wolff	Belfast	United Kingdom	For Prince Line.
17 November	Elin Knudsen	Tanker	Harland & Wolff	Belfast	United Kingdom	For Knut Knudsen A/S.
30 November	Llandaff	Salisbury-class frigate	Hawthorn Leslie and Company	Hebburn, England	United Kingdom	For Royal Navy
November	ADDSCO 595	Hopper barge	Alabama Drydock and Shipbuilding Company	Mobile, Alabama	United States	For Alabama Drydock and Shipbuilding Company.
November	L.C.D. & T. Co. No. 111	Barge	Alabama Drydock and Shipbuilding Company	Mobile, Alabama	United States	For Lake Charles Dredging.
November	L.C.D. & T. Co. No. 112	Barge	Alabama Drydock and Shipbuilding Company	Mobile, Alabama	United States	For Lake Charles Dredging.
1 December	Duke of Lancaster	Ferry	Harland & Wolff	Belfast	United Kingdom	For British Railways.
1 December	Karasj	Fishing trawler	Brooke Marine Ltd.	Lowestoft	United Kingdom	For private owner.
3 December	Stalwart	Aggressive-class minesweeper	Broward Marine	Fort Lauderdale, Florida	United States	For United States Navy
14 December	Carinthia	Saxonia-class ocean liner	John Brown & Company	Clydebank, Scotland	United Kingdom	For Cunard Line
15 December	Decatur	Forrest Sherman-class destroyer	Fore River Shipyard	Quincy, Massachusetts	United States	For United States Navy
15 December	Oti	Cargo ship	Harland & Wolff	Belfast	United Kingdom	For Elder Dempster.
16 December	Abbotsham	Ham-class minesweeper	M. W. Blackmore & Sons Ltd.	Bideford	United Kingdom	For Royal Navy.
31 December	Oronj	Fishing trawler	Brooke Marine Ltd.	Lowestoft	United Kingdom	For private owner.
December	ADDSCO 596	Hopper barge	Alabama Drydock and Shipbuilding Company	Mobile, Alabama	United States	For Alabama Drydock and Shipbuilding Company.
December	ADDSCO 597	Hopper barge	Alabama Drydock and Shipbuilding Company	Mobile, Alabama	United States	For Alabama Drydock and Shipbuilding Company.
December	Humble 806	Barge	Alabama Drydock and Shipbuilding Company	Mobile, Alabama	United States	For Humble Oil & Refining Co.
December	Humble 807	Barge	Alabama Drydock and Shipbuilding Company	Mobile, Alabama	United States	For Humble Oil & Refining Co.
December	Humble 808	Barge	Alabama Drydock and Shipbuilding Company	Mobile, Alabama	United States	For Humble Oil & Refining Co.
December	Humble 809	Barge	Alabama Drydock and Shipbuilding Company	Mobile, Alabama	United States	For Humble Oil & Refining Co.
December	Humble 810	Barge	Alabama Drydock and Shipbuilding Company	Mobile, Alabama	United States	For Humble Oil & Refining Co.
Unknown date	Albatross	Dredger	Alabama Drydock and Shipbuilding Company	Mobile, Alabama	United States	For Bay T0wing & Dredging.
Unknown date	Caroline	Tug	Alabama Drydock and Shipbuilding Company and Nashivlle Bridge Co.	Mobile, Alabama and East Nashville, Tennessee	United States	For Central Marine Corp.
Unknown date	Coro	Tug	J. Bolson & Son Ltd.	Poole	United Kingdom	For Shell Tankers Ltd.
Unknown date	Challenger	Survey ship	Aldous Successors Ltd.	Brightlingsea	United Kingdom	For Nigerian Navy.
Unknown date	Hop	Hopper barge	J. Bolson & Son Ltd.	Poole	United Kingdom	For Poole Harbour Commissioners.
Unknown date	Lachinedoc	Bulk carrier	Atlantic Shipbuilding Co. Ltd	Newport	United Kingdom	For N. M. Paterson & Sons Ltd.
Unknown date	S.H.M.2.	Hopper barge	J. Bolson & Son Ltd.	Poole	United Kingdom	For Shoreham Harbour Board.
Unknown date	3 unnamed vessels	Barges	Alabama Drydock and Shipbuilding Company	Mobile, Alabama	United States	For McDonough Construction.
