= List of ship launches in 1954 =

The list of ship launches in 1954 includes a chronological list of all ships launched in 1954.

	Ship	Class / type	Builder	Location	Country	Notes
19 January	Loch Gowan	Cargo ship	Harland & Wolff	Belfast	United Kingdom	For Royal Mail Line.
19 January	Perak	Cargo ship	Blyth Dry Docks & Shipbuilding Co. Ltd	Blyth, Northumberland	United Kingdom	For Straits Steamship Co. Ltd.
21 January	Iberia	Himalaya-class ocean liner	Harland and Wolff	Belfast	United Kingdom	For Peninsular and Oriental Steam Navigation Company.
21 January	Nautilus	Unique nuclear-powered submarine	Electric Boat	Groton, Connecticut	United States	
3 February	Ballylumford	Collier	Harland & Wolff	Belfast	United Kingdom	For John Kelly Ltd.
4 February	Tintagel Castle	Cargo ship	Harland & Wolff	Belfast	United Kingdom	For Union-Castle Line.
9 February	Thomaston	Thomaston-class dock landing ship	Ingalls Shipbuilding	Pascagoula, Mississippi	United States	First in class
12 February	Assiniboine	St. Laurent-class destroyer	Marine Industries Limited	Sorel, Quebec	Canada	
13 February	Grafton	Blackwood-class frigate	J. Samuel White	Cowes, Isle of Wight	United Kingdom	
17 February	Saxonia	Saxonia-class ocean liner	John Brown & Company	Clydebank, Scotland	United Kingdom	For Cunard Line
18 February	Kirkliston	Ton-class minesweeper	Harland & Wolff	Belfast	United Kingdom	For Royal Navy.
19 February	Braysford	Defence vessel	Harland & Wolff	Belfast	United Kingdom	For Royal Navy.
6 March	Bisham	Ham-class minesweeper	J. Bolson & Son Ltd.	Poole	United Kingdom	For Royal Navy.
11 March	Mickleham	Ham-class minesweeper	Berthon Boat Company	Lymington	United Kingdom	For Royal Navy
19 March	YC 327	Lighter	Harland & Wolff	Belfast	United Kingdom	For Admiralty
2 April	Bryansford	Defence vessel	Harland & Wolff	Belfast	United Kingdom	For Royal Navy.
4 April	Littleham	Ham-class minesweeper	Brooke Marine Ltd.	Lowestoft	United Kingdom	For Royal Navy.
14 April	British Sergeant	Tanker	Harland & Wolff	Belfast	United Kingdom	For British Tanker Company.
30 April	Timbarra	Collier	Blyth Dry Docks & Shipbuilding Co. Ltd	Blyth, Northumberland	United Kingdom	For Australian Government.
3 May	Vendetta	Daring-class destroyer	Williamstown Dockyard	Melbourne, Victoria	Australia	
7 May	Plymouth Rock	Thomaston-class dock landing ship	Ingalls Shipbuilding	Pascagoula, Mississippi	United States	
18 May	Laleston	Ton-class minesweeper	Harland & Wolff	Belfast	United Kingdom	For Royal Navy.
22 May	Windham County	Terrebonne Parish-class tank landing ship	Christy Shipbuilding	Sturgeon Bay, Wisconsin	United States	
May	Coastwise No. 2	Hopper barge	Alabama Drydock and Shipbuilding Company	Mobile, Alabama	United States	For Coastwise Transportation Line.
2 June	Pontia	Cargo ship	Harland & Wolff	Belfast	United Kingdom	For Pelagos A/S.
4 June	Cromwell	Dealey-class destroyer escort	Bath Iron Works	Bath, Maine	United States	
15 June	Kootenay	Restigouche-class destroyer	Burrard Dry Dock	Vancouver, British Columbia	Canada	
15 June	ferry type 0	For HADAG	Gustav Wolkau	Baumwall	West Germany	
29 June	Cerinthus	Tanker	Harland & Wolff	Belfast	United Kingdom	For Hadley Shipping Co.
June	SK 201	Barge	Alabama Drydock and Shipbuilding Company	Mobile, Alabama	United States	For International Paper Co.
June	SK 202	Barge	Alabama Drydock and Shipbuilding Company	Mobile, Alabama	United States	For International Paper Co.
June	SK 203	Barge	Alabama Drydock and Shipbuilding Company	Mobile, Alabama	United States	For International Paper Co.
June	SK 204	Barge	Alabama Drydock and Shipbuilding Company	Mobile, Alabama	United States	For International Paper Co.
1 July	Torquay	Whitby-class frigate	Harland and Wolff	Belfast	United Kingdom	For Royal Navy.
2 July	Whitby	Whitby-class frigate	Cammell Laird	Birkenhead, England	United Kingdom	First in class
16 July	Fort Snelling	Thomaston-class dock landing ship	Ingalls Shipbuilding	Pascagoula, Mississippi	United States	
19 July	Hannington Court	Cargo ship	Bartram & Sons	Sunderland, England	United Kingdom	For Court Line
30 July	Baie Comeau	Bulk carrier	Atlantic Shipbuilding Co. Ltd	Newport	United Kingdom	For Quebec & Ontario Transportation Co. Ltd.
30 July	Lanton	Ton-class minesweeper	Harland & Wolff	Belfast	United Kingdom	For Royal Navy.
July	SK 205	Barge	Alabama Drydock and Shipbuilding Company	Mobile, Alabama	United States	For International Paper Co.
July	SK 206	Barge	Alabama Drydock and Shipbuilding Company	Mobile, Alabama	United States	For International Paper Co.
13 August	Whippoorwill	Redwing-class minesweeper	Bellingham Shipyards Co.	Bellingham, Washington	United States	
17 August	Southern Cross	Passenger ship	Harland & Wolff	Belfast	United Kingdom	For Shaw Savill Line.
20 August	Hammerberg	Dealey-class destroyer escort	Bath Iron Works	Bath, Maine	United States	
31 August	Keppel	Blackwood-class frigate	Yarrow Shipbuilders	Glasgow, Scotland	United Kingdom	
1 September	Tide Austral	Tanker	Harland & Wolff	Belfast	United Kingdom	For Royal Australian Navy.
28 September	Belfast	Tanker	Harland & Wolff	Belfast	United Kingdom	For Belships Co.
28 September	Point Defiance	Thomaston-class dock landing ship	Ingalls Shipbuilding	Pascagoula, Mississippi	United States	
29 September	Cedarbank	Cargo ship	Harland & Wolff	Belfast	United Kingdom	For Blue Funnel Line.
29 September	Pellew	Blackwood-class frigate	Swan Hunter	Wallsend, England	United Kingdom	
1 October	Owerri	Cargo ship	Harland & Wolff	Belfast	United Kingdom	For Elder Dempster.
15 October	Nautilus	Hopper ship	Brooke Marine Ltd.	Lowestoft	United Kingdom	For Queensland Government.
26 October	Letterston	Ton-class minesweeper	Harland & Wolff	Belfast	United Kingdom	For Royal Navy.
28 October	Sheldrake	Launch	J. Bolson & Son Ltd.	Poole	United Kingdom	For Shell Tankers Ltd.
29 October	Port Sydney		Swan, Hunter & Wigham Richardson	Newcastle	England	For Port Line
22 November	Restigouche	Restigouche-class destroyer	Canadian Vickers	Montreal, Quebec	Canada	First in class
27 November	Vardefjell	Tanker	Blyth Dry Docks & Shipbuilding Co. Ltd	Blyth, Northumberland	United Kingdom	For A/S Falkefjell.
10 December	Russell	Blackwood-class frigate	Swan Hunter	Wallsend, England	United Kingdom	
11 December	Forrestal	Forrestal-class aircraft carrier	Newport News Shipbuilding	Newport News, Virginia	United States	First in class
14 December	Ivernia	Saxonia-class ocean liner	John Brown & Company	Clydebank, Scotland	United Kingdom	For Cunard Line
29 December	Western Prince	Cargo ship	Harland & Wolff	Belfast	United Kingdom	For Prince Line.
31 December	Puffin	Launch	J. Bolson & Son Ltd.	Poole	United Kingdom	For Shell Tankers Ltd.
December	S-11	Barge	Alabama Drydock and Shipbuilding Company	Mobile, Alabama	United States	For Benton & Co. Inc.
December	S-12	Barge	Alabama Drydock and Shipbuilding Company	Mobile, Alabama	United States	For Benton & Co. Inc.
Unknown date	Bernard N.1	Barge	Alabama Drydock and Shipbuilding Company	Mobile, Alabama	United States	For J. C. C. Bernard.
Unknown date	CBC-501	Hopper barge	Alabama Drydock and Shipbuilding Company	Mobile, Alabama	United States	For Canal Barge Co. Inc.
Unknown date	CBC-502	Hopper barge	Alabama Drydock and Shipbuilding Company	Mobile, Alabama	United States	For Canal Barge Co. Inc.
Unknown date	CBC-503	Hopper barge	Alabama Drydock and Shipbuilding Company	Mobile, Alabama	United States	For Canal Barge Co. Inc.
Unknown date	CBC-504	Hopper barge	Alabama Drydock and Shipbuilding Company	Mobile, Alabama	United States	For Canal Barge Co. Inc.
Unknown date	J.H.C. 718	Barge	Alabama Drydock and Shipbuilding Company	Mobile, Alabama	United States	For J. H. Coppedge Co.
Unknown date	J.H.C. 719	Barge	Alabama Drydock and Shipbuilding Company	Mobile, Alabama	United States	For J. H. Coppedge Co.
Unknown date	J.H.C. 720	Barge	Alabama Drydock and Shipbuilding Company	Mobile, Alabama	United States	For J. H. Coppedge Co.
Unknown date	J.H.C. 721	Barge	Alabama Drydock and Shipbuilding Company	Mobile, Alabama	United States	For J. H. Coppedge Co.
Unknown date	J.H.C. 722	Barge	Alabama Drydock and Shipbuilding Company	Mobile, Alabama	United States	For J. H. Coppedge Co.
Unknown date	J.H.C. 723	Barge	Alabama Drydock and Shipbuilding Company	Mobile, Alabama	United States	For J. H. Coppedge Co.
Unknown date	J.H.C. 724	Barge	Alabama Drydock and Shipbuilding Company	Mobile, Alabama	United States	For J. H. Coppedge Co.
Unknown date	J.H.C. 1000	Barge	Alabama Drydock and Shipbuilding Company	Mobile, Alabama	United States	For J. H. Coppedge Co.
Unknown date	L.C.D. & T. Co. No.107	Barge	Alabama Drydock and Shipbuilding Company	Mobile, Alabama	United States	For Lake Charles Dredging.
Unknown date	Mercurian	Tug	Bay Wharf Construction Co. Ltd.	Greenwich	United Kingdom	For Mercantile Lighterage Co. Ltd.
Unknown date	S-44 Rig No. 12	Drill barge	Alabama Drydock and Shipbuilding Company	Mobile, Alabama	United States	For The California Company.
Unknown date	No. 138	Barge	Alabama Drydock and Shipbuilding Company	Mobile, Alabama	United States	For Warrior & Gulf Navigation.
Unknown date	No. 139	Barge	Alabama Drydock and Shipbuilding Company	Mobile, Alabama	United States	For Warrior & Gulf Navigation.
Unknown date	No. 140	Barge	Alabama Drydock and Shipbuilding Company	Mobile, Alabama	United States	For Warrior & Gulf Navigation.
Unknown date	No. 141	Barge	Alabama Drydock and Shipbuilding Company	Mobile, Alabama	United States	For Warrior & Gulf Navigation.
Unknown date	No. 142	Barge	Alabama Drydock and Shipbuilding Company	Mobile, Alabama	United States	For Warrior & Gulf Navigation.
Unknown date	No. 143	Barge	Alabama Drydock and Shipbuilding Company	Mobile, Alabama	United States	For Warrior & Gulf Navigation.
Unknown date	No. 144	Barge	Alabama Drydock and Shipbuilding Company	Mobile, Alabama	United States	For Warrior & Gulf Navigation.
Unknown date	No. 145	Barge	Alabama Drydock and Shipbuilding Company	Mobile, Alabama	United States	For Warrior & Gulf Navigation.
Unknown date	No. 146	Barge	Alabama Drydock and Shipbuilding Company	Mobile, Alabama	United States	For Warrior & Gulf Navigation.
Unknown date	No. 147	Barge	Alabama Drydock and Shipbuilding Company	Mobile, Alabama	United States	For Warrior & Gulf Navigation.
Unknown date	No. 148	Barge	Alabama Drydock and Shipbuilding Company	Mobile, Alabama	United States	For Warrior & Gulf Navigation.
Unknown date	No. 149	Barge	Alabama Drydock and Shipbuilding Company	Mobile, Alabama	United States	For Warrior & Gulf Navigation.
Unknown date	Unnamed	Barge	Alabama Drydock and Shipbuilding Company	Mobile, Alabama	United States	For A. C. Thomas.
