= David Hart Dyke =

Royal Navy officer (born 1936)

Captain David Hart Dyke CBE LVO ADC
- Born: 3 October 1938 (age 88); Havant, Hampshire, England
- Spouse: Diana Margaret Luce (m. 1967)
- Children: Miranda Hart (daughter); Alice Hart Dyke (daughter)
- Military career
- Allegiance: United Kingdom
- Branch: Royal Navy
- Service years: 1959–1990
- Rank: Captain
- Units: HMS Eastbourne; HMS Lanton; HMS Palliser; HMS Gurkha; HMS Tenby; HMS Hampshire; HMY Britannia
- Commands: HMS Coventry
- Conflicts: Falklands War
- Awards: Commander of the Order of the British Empire; Lieutenant of the Royal Victorian Order
- Other work: Clerk and Chief Executive of the Worshipful Company of Skinners

Captain David Hart Dyke, CBE, LVO, ADC (born 3 October 1938) is a retired Royal Navy officer, former aide-de-camp to Queen Elizabeth II, and former commanding officer of HMS Coventry, which was sunk during the Falklands War.

== Background and education ==
Hart Dyke, a member of the Hart Dyke family, is one of four children born to the Reverend Eric Hart Dyke (1906–1971) and Mary Alexander (1915–2010). He has two sisters, Jane (b. 1936) and Sarah (b. 1946), and had a twin brother Robert, who was killed in a car crash in 1963. He was educated at St. Lawrence College, Ramsgate, Kent. His father served as a commander in the Royal Navy, before being ordained in 1953.

== Naval career ==
Hart Dyke was conscripted for National Service in 1959, and served as a midshipman in the Royal Naval Volunteer Reserve on Battleaxe. He then joined the Royal Navy and was trained at the Britannia Royal Naval College at Dartmouth, and served aboard the frigate Eastbourne, based in the Far East and Persian Gulf. He was commissioned as a sub-lieutenant on 1 September 1961, and was promoted to lieutenant on 1 January 1962, to command a Gay-class fast patrol boat based at Plymouth. He served aboard the Ton-class minesweeper Lanton during the Indonesian Confrontation in 1963, then as navigating officer aboard the frigates Palliser on fishery protection duties in 1963–1965, Gurkha in the Persian Gulf, 1965–1966, and Tenby in the Dartmouth Training Squadron, 1966–1968, before being appointed an instructor at the Royal Naval College, Dartmouth, where he was promoted to lieutenant commander on 1 January 1970. He attended a year-long staff course before being promoted to commander on 30 June 1974 and appointed first lieutenant and executive officer of the guided missile destroyer Hampshire. From 1976 he served on the staff of the Royal Naval Staff College, then from 1978 as the commander of the Royal Yacht Britannia. He was made a Member of the Royal Victorian Order (4th class) (MVO) on 1 January 1980.

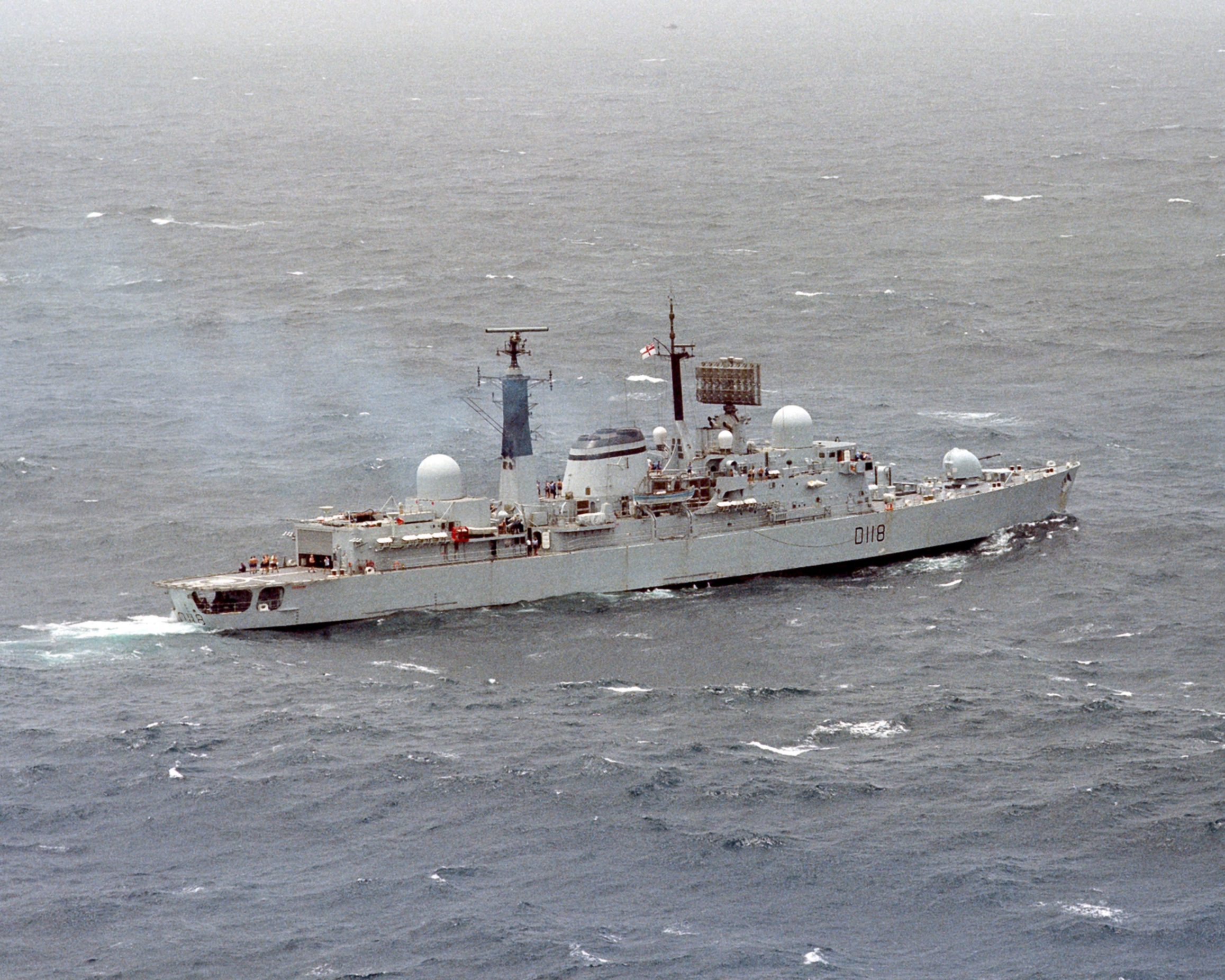
HMS Coventry in 1981

On 31 December 1980 Hart Dyke was promoted to captain, and appointed to command of the Type 42 destroyer Coventry, seeing active service during the Falklands War. On 25 May 1982 Coventry was stationed north-west of Falkland Sound with Broadsword, providing radar cover for the ground troops in San Carlos Water, when she was attacked by four Argentine A-4 Skyhawks. Hit by two 1,000 lb (450 kg) bombs, she capsized within 20 minutes, with the loss of 19 men.

After the war, Hart Dyke served as Assistant Chief of Staff to the Commander of the British Naval Staff in Washington, D.C., from 1982 to 1984, and as Assistant Naval Attaché in Washington from 1985 to 1987. From 1987 until 1989 he was Director of Naval Recruiting, and 7 July 1988 was also appointed a naval aide-de-camp to the Queen. On 1 January 1990 Hart Dyke was made a Commander of the Order of the British Empire (CBE), and retired from the Royal Navy a week later on the 7th.

After leaving the Navy, Hart Dyke was appointed Clerk and Chief Executive of the Worshipful Company of Skinners, a livery company of the City of London. He retired in 2003, and in 2007 published Four Weeks in May, his account of the loss of Coventry during the Falklands War.

== Personal life ==
On 8 July 1967 he married Diana Margaret Luce (b. 1939), the daughter of Sir William Luce (1907–1977) and Margaret Napier. They have two children: comedian and actress Miranda Katharine (b. 1972) and Alice Louisa (b. 1975). His nephew is plant hunter Tom Hart Dyke, heir to Lullingstone Castle.

== In media ==
Hart Dyke has featured in two documentaries about the loss of Coventry. The first, Sea of Fire, was produced by Windfall Films and broadcast on BBC Two on 1 June 2007, to mark the 25th anniversary of the ship's loss. The second, "Sinking The Coventry", was part of the series Seconds From Disaster, first broadcast on the National Geographic Channel on 27 December 2012, and also featured interviews with the Argentinian airmen who attacked the ship.

A film, Destroyer, based on Hart Dyke's book, to be directed by Tom Shankland and starring Paul Bettany and Matthew Goode was announced in 2012. Some filming took place aboard HMS Edinburgh in mid-2013.

== Publications ==
- Hart Dyke, David (13 January 2007). Four Weeks in May. UK: Atlantic Books. ISBN 9781843545903.
