= HMS Keppel (F85) =

1956 Type 14 or Blackwood-class frigate of the Royal Navy

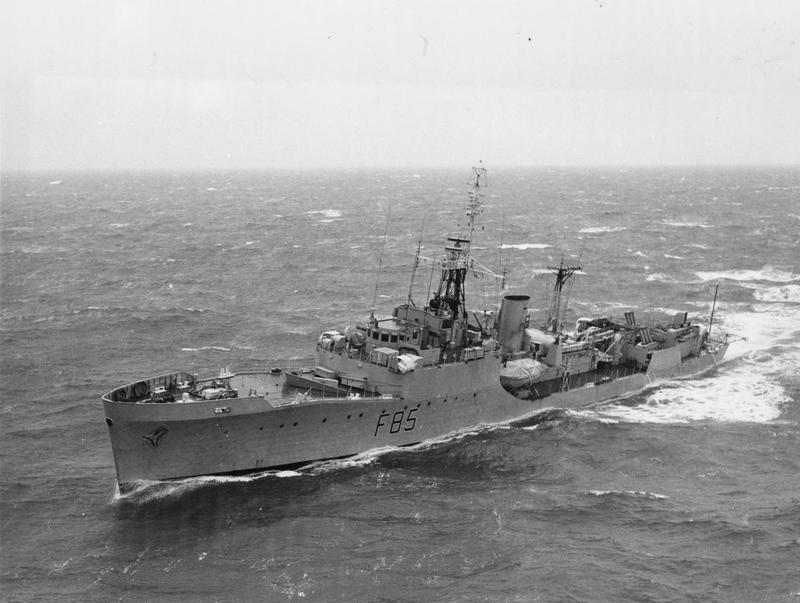
- Blackwood-class frigate HMS Keppel, February 1972

History

United Kingdom
- Name: HMS Keppel
- Namesake: Augustus Keppel
- Builder: Yarrow, Scotstoun
- Laid down: 27 March 1953
- Launched: 31 August 1954
- Commissioned: 6 July 1956
- Identification: Pennant number: F85
- Fate: Scrapped 1979

General characteristics
- Class & type: Blackwood-class frigate (Type 14 frigate)
- Displacement: 1,456 long tons (1,479 t) full load
- Length: 310 ft (94.5 m)
- Beam: 33 ft (10.1 m)
- Draught: 15 ft (4.6 m)
- Installed power: 2 × Babcock & Wilcox boilers; 15,000 shp (11 MW)
- Propulsion: 1 shaft; 1 steam turbine set
- Speed: 27 knots (50 km/h; 31 mph)
- Range: 5,200 nmi (9,600 km; 6,000 mi) at 12 knots (22 km/h; 14 mph)
- Complement: 140
- Sensors & processing systems: Radar Type 974 navigation; Sonar Type 174 search; Sonar Type 162 target classification; Sonar Type 170 targeting
- Armament: 3 × 40 mm Bofors guns; 2 × Limbo Mark 10 anti-submarine mortars

HMS Keppel (F85) was one of a dozen Blackwood-class frigate (also known as the Type 14 class) of second-rate anti-submarine frigates built for the Royal Navy in the 1950s. She was named for Augustus Keppel, who served during the Seven Years' War and was admiral of the Western Squadron during the American War of Independence.

== Description ==
The Blackwood class displaced 1,180 long tons (1,200 t) at standard load and 1,456 long tons (1,479 t) at deep load. They had an overall length of 310 feet (94.5 m), a beam of 33 feet (10.1 m) and a draught of 15 feet (4.6 m). The ships were powered by one English Electric geared steam turbine that drove the single propeller shaft, using steam provided by two Babcock & Wilcox boilers. The turbine developed a total of 15,000 shaft horsepower (11,000 kW) and gave a maximum speed of 27 knots (50 km/h; 31 mph). The Blackwoods had a range of 4,500 nautical miles (8,300 km; 5,200 mi) at 12 knots (22 km/h; 14 mph). Their complement was 140 officers and ratings.

The ships were armed with three Bofors 40 mm guns in single mounts. The mount on the quarterdeck was later removed as it was unusable in heavy seas. They were equipped with two triple-barrelled Limbo Mark 10 anti-submarine mortars. The Blackwood-class ships had the same sonar suite as the larger Whitby-class frigates where the Limbo mortars were controlled by three sonars, the Type 174 search set, Type 162 target-classification set and the Type 170 'pencil beam' targeting set to determine the bearing and depth of the target.

== Construction and career ==
Keppel was laid down by Yarrow Shipbuilders at their Scotstoun shipyard on 27 March 1953, launched on 31 August 1954 and completed on 6 July 1956.

On commissioning, Keppel joined the Second Training Squadron, based at Portland Harbour. She paid off for an extended refit in March 1958, during which her hull was strengthened as a result of operating experience of ships of the class in heavy seas. In September 1960, Keppel returned to the Portland Training Squadron, and from June 1963 to April 1964 served with the Fishery Protection Squadron.

In February 1973, Keppel was reduced to reserve, joining the Standby Squadron at Chatham. She was listed for disposal when a boiler explosion on sister ship Hardy, serving with the 2nd Frigate Squadron at Portland, caused Keppel to return to active service to replace Hardy in July 1975. Keppel remained with the 2nd Frigate Squadron, serving in the training role, until November 1976.

She was again placed on the disposal list in 1977 and was scrapped at Sittingbourne in 1979.

== Bibliography ==
- Colledge, J. J.; Warlow, Ben (2006) [1969]. Ships of the Royal Navy: The Complete Record of All Fighting Ships of the Royal Navy from the 15th Century to the Present (3rd Rev ed.). London: Chatham Publishing. ISBN 978-1-86176-281-8. OCLC 67375475.
- Critchley, Mike (1986). British Warships Since 1945: Part 5: Frigates. Liskeard, UK: Maritime Books. ISBN 0-907771-13-0.
- Friedman, Norman (2006). British Destroyers and Frigates, the Second World War and After. Annapolis, Maryland: Naval Institute Press. ISBN 1-86176-137-6.
- Gardiner, Robert; Chumbley, Stephen & Budzbon, Przemysław (1995). Conway's All the World's Fighting Ships 1947–1995. Annapolis, Maryland: Naval Institute Press. ISBN 1-55750-132-7.
- Marriott, Leo (1983). Royal Navy Frigates 1945–1983. Shepperton, Surrey, UK: Ian Allan. ISBN 0-7110-1322-5.
