= HMS Eastbourne (F73) =

1958 Type 12 or Whitby-class frigate of the Royal Navy

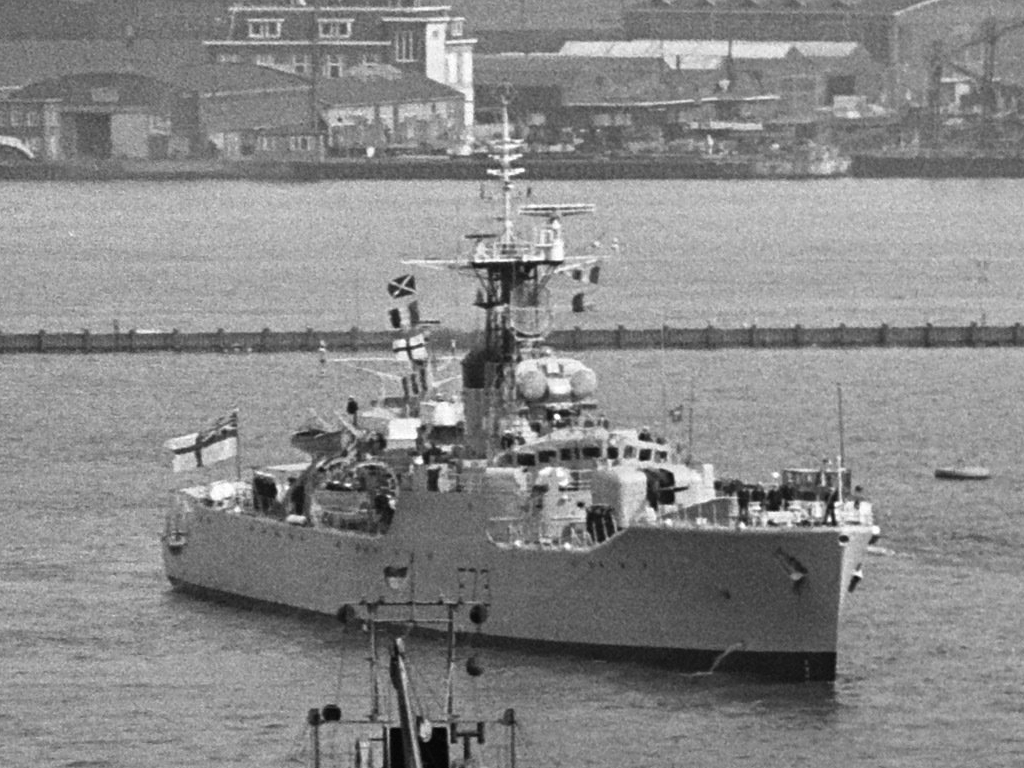
- HMS Eastbourne in May 1969

History

United Kingdom
- Name: HMS Eastbourne
- Ordered: 6 March 1951
- Builder: Vickers-Armstrongs, Newcastle-on-Tyne (completed at Barrow)
- Laid down: 13 January 1954
- Launched: 29 December 1955
- Commissioned: 9 January 1958
- Decommissioned: 1984
- Reclassified: Training ship in 1971
- Identification: Pennant number: F73
- Fate: Sold for scrapping in 1985

General characteristics
- Class & type: Whitby-class frigate
- Displacement: 2,150 tons (2,185 tonnes); 2,560 tons full load (2,600 tonnes)
- Length: 360 ft (109.7 m) w/l; 370 ft (112.8 m) o/a
- Beam: 41 ft (12.5 m)
- Draught: 17 ft (5.18 m)
- Propulsion: Y-100 plant; 2 Babcock & Wilcox boilers, 2 English Electric steam turbines, 2 shafts, 30,000 shp (22 MW)
- Speed: 30 kn (56 km/h)
- Range: 370 tons oil fuel, 4,200 nmi (7,780 km) at 12 knots (22 km/h)
- Complement: 152, later 225
- Sensors & processing systems: Radar Type 293Q target indication.; Radar Type 277Q height finding (later removed); Radar Type 275 fire control on director Mark 6M; Radar Type 262 fire control on STAAG; Radar Type 974 navigation; Type 1010 Cossor Mark 10 IFF; Sonar Type 174 search; Sonar Type 162 target classification; Sonar Type 170 attack
- Armament: 1 × twin 4.5 in (114 mm) gun Mark 6; 1 × twin 40 mm Bofors gun Mark 2 STAAG, later; 1 × single 40 mm Bofors gun Mark 7; 2 × Limbo A/S mortar Mark 10; 12 × 21 in A/S torpedo tubes (removed or never shipped)

HMS Eastbourne was a Whitby-class, or Type 12, anti-submarine frigate of the Royal Navy of the United Kingdom.

== Design ==
The Whitbys were designed as specialist anti-submarine warships, intended to counter fast modern diesel-electric submarines. As such, the design was required to reach a speed of at least 27 knots (31 mph; 50 km/h), maintaining high speed in rough weather conditions and have a range of 4,500 nautical miles (5,200 mi; 8,300 km) at 12 knots (14 mph; 22 km/h). To meet these requirements, the Type 12s had a new hull form and, unlike the contemporary Type 41 anti-aircraft and Type 61 air direction frigates, were powered by steam turbines.

Eastbourne was 370 feet 0 inches (112.78 m) long overall and 360 feet 0 inches (109.73 m) at the waterline, with a beam of 41 feet 0 inches (12.50 m) and a draught of 11 feet 0 inches (3.35 m) forward and 13 feet 0 inches (3.96 m) at the propellers. The ships were powered by the new Y-100 machinery in which the ship's boilers and steam turbines were designed as a closely integrated set of machinery to increase efficiency. Two Babcock & Wilcox water-tube boilers fed steam at 550 pounds per square inch (3,800 kPa) and 850 °F (454 °C) to two sets of geared steam turbines which drove two propeller shafts, fitted with large (2 feet (0.61 m) diameter) slow-turning propellers. The machinery was rated at 30,000 shaft horsepower (22,000 kW), giving a speed of 29 knots (33 mph; 54 km/h). Crew was about 189 when operated as a leader and 152 as an ordinary ship.

A twin 4.5-inch (113 mm) Mark 6 gun mount was fitted forward, with 350 rounds of ammunition carried, with close-in armament of a stabilised STAAG (Stabilised Tachymetric Anti-Aircraft Gun) twin Bofors 40 mm L/60 gun mount aft. The design anti-submarine armament consisted of twelve 21-inch torpedo-tubes (eight fixed and two twin rotating mounts) for Mark 20E Bidder homing anti-submarine torpedoes, backed up by two Limbo anti-submarine mortars fitted aft. The Bidder homing torpedoes proved unsuccessful however, being too slow to catch modern submarines, and the torpedo tubes were soon removed.

The ship was fitted with a Type 293Q surface/air search radar on the foremast, with a Type 277 height-finding radar on a short mast forward of the foremast. A Mark 6M fire control system (including a Type 275 radar) for the 4.5 inch guns was mounted above the ship's bridge, while a Type 974 navigation radar was also fitted. The ship's sonar fit consisted of Type 174 search, Type 170 fire control sonar for Limbo and a Type 162 sonar for classifying targets on the sea floor.

== Construction ==
Eastbourne was laid down at Vickers-Armstrongs Newcastle upon Tyne shipyard on 13 January 1951 and was launched on 29 December 1955. The ship was being fitted out when on 20 February 1956 a fire broke out on board, killing three men, while a dockyard ship manager, Richard Joicey, was awarded the George Medal for rescuing four trapped workers. Construction continued at Vickers-Armstrongs' Barrow-in-Furness shipyard, and Eastbourne was completed on 9 January 1958.

== Operational service ==
On commissioning Eastbourne joined the 3rd Training Squadron, based at Londonderry Port, Northern Ireland. In August that year, she was loaned to the Fishery Protection Squadron. Eastbourne carried the flag of Commodore, Fishery Protection Squadron (CFPS) in the First Cod War, off Iceland. The First Cod War started on 1 September 1958, when Iceland unilaterally extended its territorial waters from 3 nmi (3.5 mi; 5.6 km) to 12 nmi (14 mi; 22 km) in order to protect Icelandic fishing grounds. Eastbourne, along with the frigates Russell and Palliser and the minesweeper Hound, was deployed off Iceland on 1 September to protect British trawlers, with Eastbourne preventing several trawlers from being arrested by Icelandic gunboats and capturing two Icelandic boarding parties in the early days of the confrontation. The ship paid courtesy visits to its namesake town of Eastbourne on the south coast of England, and to Odense, Denmark, Stockholm, Sweden and Brest, France. In June 1959, Eastbourne joined the 4th Frigate Squadron, serving in Home waters and the Mediterranean. In 1966 she was the leader of the Dartmouth Training Squadron.

In 1972, Eastbourne replaced Rapid as the 'afloat' training ship for the artificer apprentices at HMS Caledonia. During their 14 weeks aboard ship, the apprentices were trained in general engineering and were examined for their auxiliary machinery certificates. She also took part in the Royal Navy's Fleet Review in celebration of HM the Queen's Silver Jubilee.

== Harbour training ship ==
In 1976 Eastbourne was dispatched to Iceland to assist in the third Cod War and on 22 May she was damaged in a collision with the ICGV Baldur. During the subsequent repairs in Rosyth in 1977, a hull inspection found that Eastbourne was no longer fit for sea, though her machinery was still in good condition. Her propellers were removed, and 'brake wheels' were fitted as a replacement. This enabled her to be steamed at full power with no forward movement. This enabled the apprentices to assist in operation of her machinery at full power, with the added benefit of churning the dockyard basin water up to improve its aeration. Officers under training from Royal Naval Engineering College Manadon were also able to be trained onboard before their first sea draft.

In the 1980s, Eastbourne remained moored at Rosyth Dockyard alongside Duncan as harbour training ship for the marine engineering artificer apprentices of Caledonia. Once Caledonia was scheduled to close, both Eastbourne and Duncan were de-stored and paid off for disposal in March 1984. Training of the marine engineering artificer apprentices was transferred to HMS Sultan.

== Publications ==
- Blackman, Raymond V. B. (1960). Jane's Fighting Ships 1960–61. London: Sampson Low, Marston & Co. Ltd.
- Colledge, J. J.; Warlow, Ben (2006) [1969]. Ships of the Royal Navy: The Complete Record of All Fighting Ships of the Royal Navy from the 15th Century to the Present (3rd Rev ed.). London: Chatham Publishing. ISBN 978-1-86176-281-8. OCLC 67375475.
- Critchley, Mike (1992). British Warships Since 1945: Part 5: Frigates. Liskeard, UK: Maritime Press. ISBN 0-907771-13-0.
- Friedman, Norman (2008). British Destroyers & Frigates: The Second World War and After. Barnsley, UK: Seaforth Publishing. ISBN 978-1-84832-015-4.
- Hargreaves, B. B. (February 2022). "HMS Eastbourne". Marine News Supplement: Warships. 76 (2): S159. ISSN 0966-6958.
- Marriott, Leo (1983). Royal Navy Frigates 1945–1983. Shepperton, Surrey, UK: Ian Allan Ltd. ISBN 0-7110-1322-5.
- Preston, Antony (1995). "United Kingdom". In Chumbley, Stephen (ed.). Conway's All the World's Fighting Ships 1947-1995. Annapolis, Maryland: Naval Institute Press. pp. 479–543. ISBN 1-55750-132-7.
- Roberts, John (2009). Safeguarding the Nation: The Story of the Royal Navy. Barnsley, UK: Seaforth Publishing. ISBN 978-1-84832-043-7.
