= F94 =

F94 or F-94 may refer to:

- HMS Brave (F94), a Type 22 frigate of the Royal Navy
- HMS Palliser (F94), a Blackwood-class anti-submarine frigate of the Royal Navy
- Lockheed F-94 Starfire, an American interceptor aircraft
- Scania F94, a series of front engine buses
