= F84 =

F84 or F-84 may refer to:

- F-84 Thunderjet, an early American straight-wing jet fighter
- F-84F Thunderstreak, a swept-wing development of the Thunderjet
- XF-84H Thunderscreech, a turboprop variant of the Thunderstreak
- HMS Exmouth, a Blackwood class frigate
- the ICD-11 medical code for Pervasive developmental disorders
