= F62 =

F62 may refer to:

- Farman F.62, a French aircraft
- HMS Pellew (F62), a Blackwood-class frigate of the Royal Navy
- Route F62 (WMATA), a bus route operated by the Washington Metropolitan Area Transit Authority
- Samsung Galaxy F62, a smartphone
