= F54 =

F54 may refer to:

- F54 (classification), a disability sport classification for athletics
- HMS Hardy (F54), a British anti-submarine warfare frigate 1953–1984
- Mini F54, a second-generation Mini Clubman automobile 2015–present
