= HMS Rapid (H32) =

R-class destroyer converted to Type 15 frigate of the Royal Navy

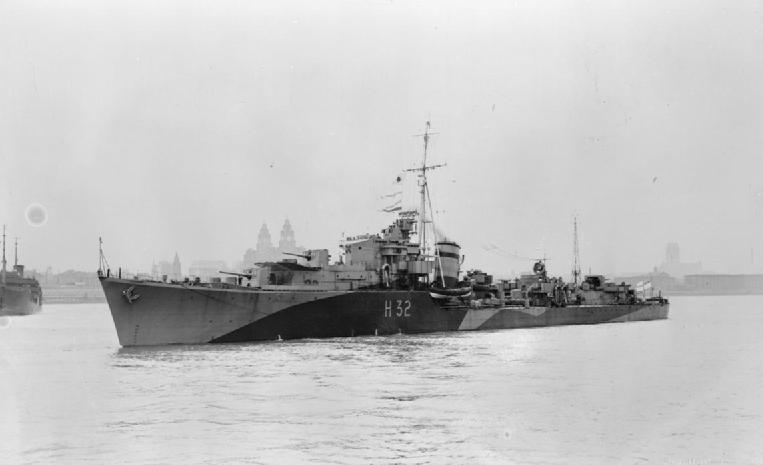
- Rapid underway on the River Mersey, February 1943

History

United Kingdom
- Name: HMS Rapid
- Ordered: 1 April 1940
- Builder: Cammell Laird & Company
- Laid down: 16 June 1941
- Launched: 16 July 1942
- Commissioned: 20 February 1943
- Identification: Pennant number: H32 (F138 from 1953)
- Fate: Sunk as target 13 September 1981

General characteristics As R-class destroyer
- Class & type: R-class destroyer
- Displacement: 1,705 tons (1,732 tonnes); 2,425 tons (2,464 tonnes) full load
- Length: 358.25 ft (109.19 m) o/a
- Beam: 35.75 ft (10.90 m)
- Draught: 9.5 ft (2.9 m)
- Propulsion: 2 x Admiralty 3-drum water-tube boilers, Parsons geared steam turbines, 40,000 shp (30,000 kW) on 2 shafts
- Speed: 36 kn (67 km/h)
- Range: 4,675 nmi (8,658 km) at 20 knots (37 km/h)
- Complement: 176
- Sensors & processing systems: Radar Type 290 air warning; Radar Type 285 ranging & bearing
- Armament: 4 × QF 4.7-inch (120-mm) Mk.IX guns single mounts CP Mk.XVIII; 4 × QF 2 pdr Mk.VIII (40 mm L/39), quad mount Mk.VII; 2 × 2, 4 × 1 QF 20 mm Oerlikon, single mount P Mk.III; 8 (2x4) tubes for 21-inch (530 mm) torpedoes Mk.IX; 4 × throwers & 2 x racks, 70 depth charges

General characteristics As Type 15 frigate
- Displacement: 2,300 tons (standard); 2,700 tons (full load)
- Length: 358 ft (109 m) o/a
- Beam: 37.75 ft (11.51 m)
- Draught: 14.5 ft (4.4 m)
- Propulsion: 2 × Admiralty 3-drum boilers, steam turbines on 2 shafts, 40,000 shp
- Speed: 31 kn (57 km/h) (full load)
- Range: 4,675 nmi (8,658 km) at 20 knots (37 km/h)
- Complement: 174
- Sensors & processing systems: Radar; Type 293Q target indication.; Type 277Q surface search; Type 974 navigation; Type 262 fire control on director CRBF; Type 1010 Cossor Mark 10 IFF; Sonar: Type 174 search; Type 162 target classification; Type 170 attack
- Armament: 1 × twin 4 in gun Mark 19; 1 × twin 40mm Bofors Mk.5; 2 × Limbo Mark 10 A/S mortar

HMS Rapid was an R-class destroyer of the Royal Navy that saw service during the Second World War and was sunk as a target in 1981.

== Second World War service ==
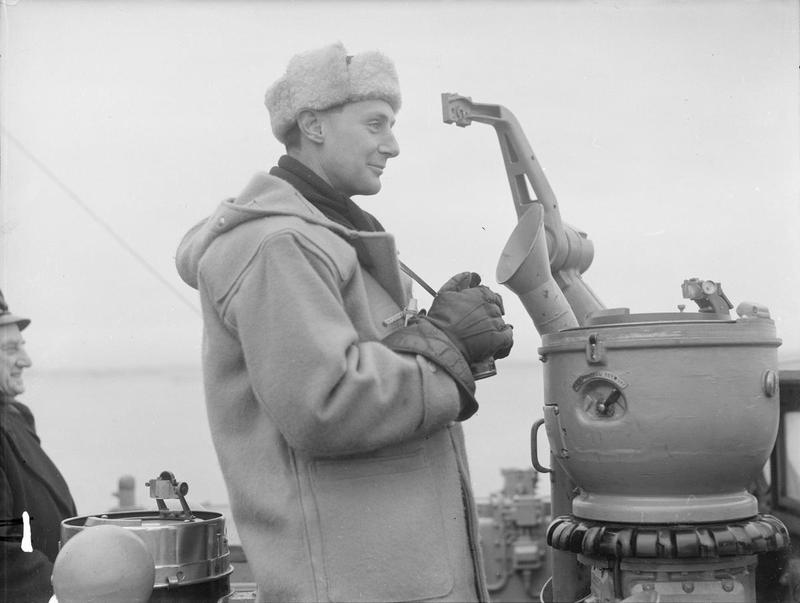
A British destroyer goes through her paces. 17 February 1943, on board HMS Rapid, a British destroyer proves her sea-going and fighting qualities during trials at sea. A14607

During its building, Rapid was adopted by the civil communities of Sutton and Cheam as part of the Warship Week National savings campaign in 1943.

In February 1943 Rapid began sea trials and was allocated for service with the 11th Destroyer Flotilla. Her first patrols were as convoy defence on Atlantic convoys, travelling to Freetown and by the end of 1943 she was transferred to the Eastern Fleet, based in Ceylon.

In March 1945 Rapid was part of Force 68, serving in the Indian Ocean and later the Pacific. In one operation she was damaged by fire from a shore battery, with 11 killed and 23 wounded. She was towed to Akyab for repairs. The repairs were completed by August 1945 and she returned for service in the planned landings on Malaya, as part of Operation Zipper, which were cancelled on the dropping of the atomic bomb and the Japanese surrender.

== Postwar service ==
In 1946 Rapid commissioned as an air training target ship and attendant destroyer to aircraft carriers. In February 1947 she was based at Rosyth.

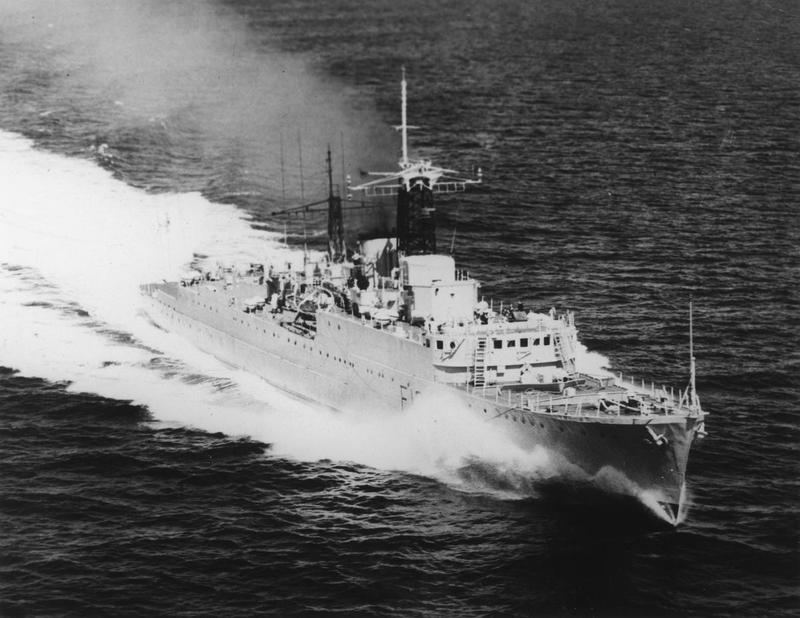
HMS Rapid, as a Type 15 frigate in the North Sea Race, 1971 (IWM)

Between June 1951 and October 1953, she was converted into a Type 15 fast anti-submarine frigate, by Alex Stephen on the Clyde, with the new pennant number F138. Between 1954 and 1965 Rapid was part of the Reserve Fleet, but did take part in 'Navy Days' in Portsmouth during 1959.

On 6 July 1971 Rapid would participate in a race against a similar ship, HMS Cavalier. Rapid narrowly lost the race after a safety valve blew.

== Decommissioning and disposal ==
In 1965 Rapid was placed on the disposal list. However, in 1966 she was allocated to the shore establishment Caledonia to assist in the sea training of engine room artificers. The ship was used as a day runner from Rosyth Dockyard to give help in certificating artificers, who were under training. Rapid was replaced in this role by the frigate Eastbourne in 1973.

She then became a target ship, being damaged by missiles launched from the guided missile destroyer Bristol in 1976. Following repairs in 1977 she was used as a target ship in Milford Haven. She was placed on the disposal list again in 1978. She was subsequently sunk in the Western Approaches by torpedoes from the submarine Onyx in 1981.

== Publications ==
- Colledge, J. J.; Warlow, Ben (2006) [1969]. Ships of the Royal Navy: The Complete Record of All Fighting Ships of the Royal Navy from the 15th Century to the Present (3rd Rev ed.). London: Chatham Publishing. ISBN 978-1-86176-281-8. OCLC 67375475.
- Critchley, Mike (1982). British Warships Since 1945: Part 3: Destroyers. Liskeard, UK: Maritime Books. ISBN 0-9506323-9-2.
- English, John (2001). Obdurate to Daring: British Fleet Destroyers 1941–45. Windsor, UK: World Ship Society. ISBN 978-0-9560769-0-8.
- Friedman, Norman (2006). British Destroyers & Frigates: The Second World War and After. Annapolis, Maryland: Naval Institute Press. ISBN 1-86176-137-6.
- Lenton, H. T. (1998). British & Empire Warships of the Second World War. Annapolis, Maryland: Naval Institute Press. ISBN 1-55750-048-7.
- Marriott, Leo (1983). Royal Navy Frigates 1945–1983. Ian Allan. ISBN 0-7110-1322-5.
- Raven, Alan & Roberts, John (1978). War Built Destroyers O to Z Classes. London: Bivouac Books. ISBN 0-85680-010-4.
- Richardson, Ian (August 2021). Osborne, Richard (ed.). "Type 15 Frigates, Part 2: Ship Histories". Warships: Marine News Supplement. 75 (8): 381–391. ISSN 0966-6958.
- Rohwer, Jürgen (2005). Chronology of the War at Sea 1939–1945: The Naval History of World War Two (Third Revised ed.). Annapolis, Maryland: Naval Institute Press. ISBN 1-59114-119-2.
- Whitley, M. J. (1988). Destroyers of World War 2. Annapolis, Maryland: Naval Institute Press. ISBN 0-87021-326-1.
