= HMS Grafton (F51) =

1957 Type 14 or Blackwood-class frigate of the Royal Navy

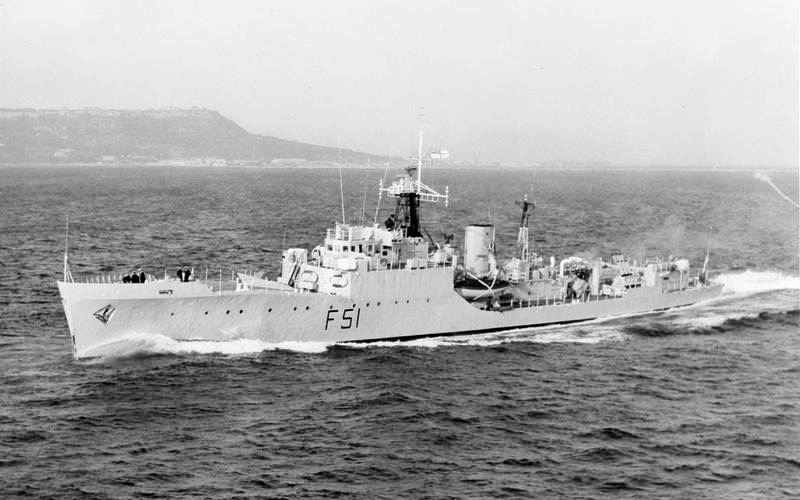
- HMS Grafton

History

United Kingdom
- Name: HMS Grafton
- Namesake: Henry FitzRoy, 1st Duke of Grafton
- Builder: JS White and Co Ltd
- Laid down: 25 February 1953
- Launched: 13 February 1954
- Commissioned: 8 January 1957
- Identification: Pennant number: F51
- Fate: Broken up, 1971

General characteristics
- Class & type: Blackwood-class frigate (Type 14 frigate)
- Displacement: 1,456 long tons (1,479 t) full load
- Length: 310 ft (94.5 m)
- Beam: 33 ft (10.1 m)
- Draught: 15 ft (4.6 m)
- Installed power: 2 × Babcock & Wilcox boilers; 15,000 shp (11 MW)
- Propulsion: 1 shaft; 1 steam turbine set
- Speed: 27 knots (50 km/h; 31 mph)
- Range: 5,200 nmi (9,600 km; 6,000 mi) at 12 knots (22 km/h; 14 mph)
- Complement: 140
- Sensors & processing systems: Radar Type 974 navigation; Sonar Type 174 search; Sonar Type 162 target classification; Sonar Type 170 targeting
- Armament: 3 × 40 mm Bofors guns; 2 × Limbo Mark 10 anti-submarine mortars

HMS Grafton was one of a dozen Blackwood-class frigate (also known as the Type 14 class) of second-rate anti-submarine frigates built for the Royal Navy in the 1950s.

== Description ==
The Blackwood class displaced 1,180 long tons (1,200 t) at standard load and 1,456 long tons (1,479 t) at deep load. They had an overall length of 310 feet (94.5 m), a beam of 33 feet (10.1 m) and a draught of 15 feet (4.6 m). The ships were powered by one English Electric geared steam turbine that drove the single propeller shaft, using steam provided by two Babcock & Wilcox boilers. The turbine developed a total of 15,000 shaft horsepower (11,000 kW) and gave a maximum speed of 27 knots (50 km/h; 31 mph). The Blackwoods had a range of 4,500 nautical miles (8,300 km; 5,200 mi) at 12 knots (22 km/h; 14 mph). Their complement was 140 officers and ratings.

The ships were armed with three Bofors 40 mm guns in single mounts. The mount on the quarterdeck was later removed as it was unusable in heavy seas. They were equipped with two triple-barrelled Limbo Mark 10 anti-submarine mortars. The Blackwood-class ships had the same sonar suite as the larger Whitby-class frigates where the Limbo mortars were controlled by three sonars, the Type 174 search set, Type 162 target-classification set and the Type 170 'pencil beam' targeting set to determine the bearing and depth of the target.

== Construction and career ==
Grafton was launched by Lady Grantham, wife of Admiral Sir Guy Grantham, who was Commander-in-Chief Portsmouth. She was first commissioned in January 1957, serving with the 2nd Frigate Squadron based at Portland Harbour until March 1963, when the ship started a refit at Portsmouth Dockyard. Following this refit, Grafton joined the 20th Frigate Squadron based at Londonderry Port in Northern Ireland, being based there until April 1969, when she was paid off.

She attended Portsmouth Navy Days in 1967 and again in 1968. Grafton was broken up at Inverkeithing from December 1971.

== Bibliography ==
- Colledge, J. J.; Warlow, Ben (2006) [1969]. Ships of the Royal Navy: The Complete Record of All Fighting Ships of the Royal Navy from the 15th Century to the Present (3rd Rev ed.). London: Chatham Publishing. ISBN 978-1-86176-281-8. OCLC 67375475.
- Critchley, Mike (1986). British Warships Since 1945: Part 5: Frigates. Liskeard, UK: Maritime Books. ISBN 0-907771-13-0.
- Friedman, Norman (2006). British Destroyers and Frigates, the Second World War and After. Annapolis, Maryland: Naval Institute Press. ISBN 1-86176-137-6.
- Gardiner, Robert; Chumbley, Stephen & Budzbon, Przemysław (1995). Conway's All the World's Fighting Ships 1947-1995. Annapolis, Maryland: Naval Institute Press. ISBN 1-55750-132-7.
- Marriott, Leo (1983). Royal Navy Frigates 1945-1983. Shepperton, Surrey, UK: Ian Allan. ISBN 0-7110-1322-5.
