= HMS Dundas =

1956 Type 14 or Blackwood-class frigate of the Royal Navy

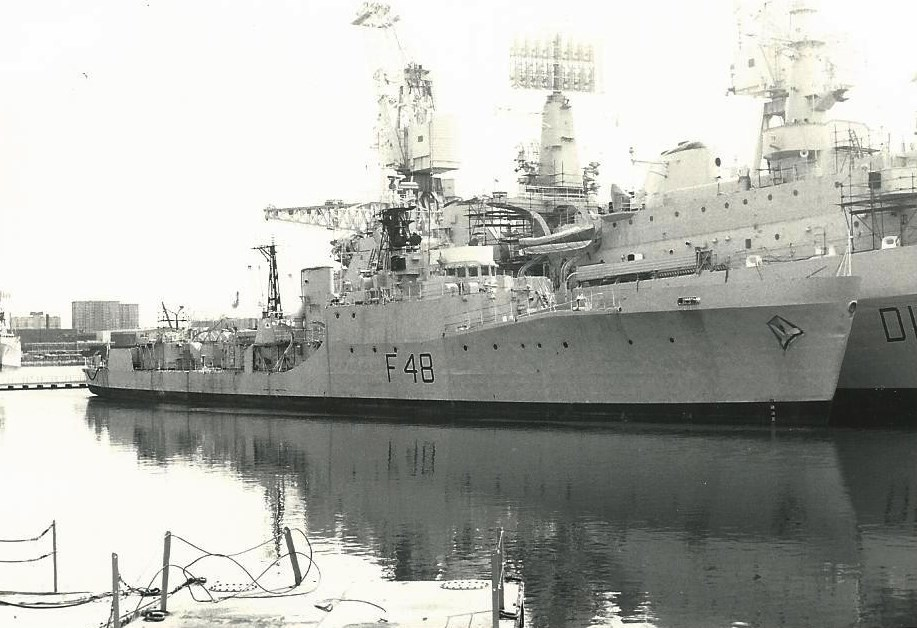
- HMS Dundas, the last active Type 14 "Captain" or "Blackwood" Class anti-submarine frigate at Portsmouth Navy Days, August 1980

History

United Kingdom
- Name: HMS Dundas
- Namesake: James Whitley Deans Dundas
- Builder: JS White and Co Ltd, Cowes
- Laid down: 17 October 1952
- Launched: 25 September 1953
- Acquired: March 1956
- Commissioned: 16 March 1956
- Identification: Pennant number: F48
- Fate: Broken up 1983

General characteristics
- Class & type: Blackwood-class frigate
- Displacement: 1,456 tons (1,479 tonnes) full load
- Length: 310 ft (94 m)
- Beam: 33 ft (10 m)
- Draught: 15 ft (4.6 m)
- Propulsion: Y-100 plant; 2 × Babcock & Wilcox boilers; steam turbines on single shaft; 15,000 shp (11 MW)
- Speed: 27 knots (50 km/h)
- Range: 5,200 nautical miles (9,630 km) at 12 knots (22 km/h)
- Complement: 112
- Sensors & processing systems: Radar Type 974 navigation; Sonar Type 174 search; Sonar Type 162 target classification; Sonar Type 170 targeting
- Armament: 3 × 40 mm Bofors gun Mark 7 (quarterdeck mount later removed); 2 × Limbo Mark 10 anti-submarine mortars

HMS Dundas was a Blackwood-class anti-submarine warfare frigate of the Royal Navy.

== Orders and delivery ==
The Blackwood-class frigates were first ordered in 1951, with Dundas being the first to be commissioned, on 9 March 1956. They were considered to be of limited usage, and best kept for anti-submarine warfare (ASW) duties. Twelve were delivered in total. Dundas was built by JS White and Co Ltd, at Cowes.

== Specifications ==
Dundas had a crew of 140, a displacement of 1,180 tonnes when empty and 1,535 tonnes when full. She was 310 ft (94 m) long, 33 ft (10 m) on the beam and had a draught of 15 ft (4.6 m). She was powered by a Parsons or English Electric geared steam turbine, with two Babcock & Wilcox boilers giving 15,000 shp (11 MW) and a speed of 25 knots (46 km/h). Her armament included two Mk.NC 10 Limbo 3-barreled ASW mortars and two 21-inch (533 mm) torpedo tubes in twin mounts. She was also equipped with sonar and radar.

== Service ==
Dundas appeared in the Ava Gardner film The Little Hut in 1957. Brief footage of the Dundas at sea also appeared in the 1964 Look at Life episode entitled The Price of Valour.

In 1966 Dundas was part of the 2nd Frigate Squadron, based at Portland and used for anti-submarine training. In that year she was present at Portsmouth Navy Days. She subsequently completed a 14-month refit at Gibraltar Dockyard and re-commissioned on 21 June 1968. In the same year she took part in Navy Days at Portsmouth Dockyard.

In 1970 she was present at Portsmouth Navy Days, at the time she had just completed a refit in Gibraltar and was still part of the Second Frigate Squadron to help train officers and men in Anti-Submarine Warfare at Portland.

Dundas attended the 1977 Silver Jubilee Fleet Review off Spithead when she was part of the 2nd Frigate Squadron.

== Decommissioning and disposal ==
A unrepairable propeller shaft knock was discovered when she sailed from Portsmouth, after a brief spell in dry dock she was moved to Chatham dockyard where the entire crew transferred to her sister ship HMS Hardy taking with them anything useful for spares and crew comfort. Dundas was eventually scrapped in Troon in April 1983.

== Publications ==
- Colledge, J. J.; Warlow, Ben (2006) [1969]. Ships of the Royal Navy: The Complete Record of All Fighting Ships of the Royal Navy from the 15th Century to the Present (3rd Rev ed.). London: Chatham Publishing. ISBN 978-1-86176-281-8. OCLC 67375475.
- Marriott, Leo (1983). Royal Navy Frigates 1945-1983. Ian Allan Ltd. ISBN 07110 1322 5.
