= F91 =

F91 may refer to:

- F91 Dudelange, a football club, based in Dudelange in southern Luxembourg
- Mobile Suit Gundam F91, a 1991 animated film
- HMS Brazen (F91), a 1981 British Royal Navy Type 22 frigate
- HMS Murray (F91), a British Royal Navy Blackwood class second-rate anti-submarine frigate
- Republic XF-91 Thunderceptor, a rocket-jet hybrid interceptor
- Casio F-91W, a common and inexpensive digital watch, claimed by some to be associated with terrorism
- The McCarthy 91 function, a recursively defined mathematical function

and also:

- Conduct disorders ICD-10 code
