= F97 =

F97 or F-97 may refer to:

- F-97 (Michigan county highway)
- F-97 Starfire, a F-94 Starfire aircraft variant
- HMS Russell (F97), a British Royal Navy Blackwood class second-rate anti-submarine frigate
