= HMS Malcolm (F88) =

1957 Type 14 or Blackwood-class frigate of the Royal Navy

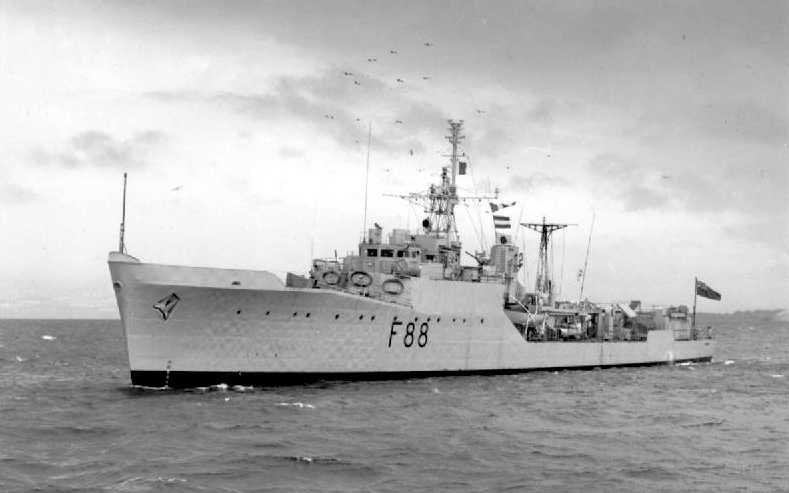
- HMS Malcolm in January 1958

History

United Kingdom
- Name: HMS Malcolm
- Namesake: Admiral Sir Pulteney Malcolm, GCB and GCMG
- Builder: Yarrow Shipbuilders, Scotstoun
- Laid down: 1 February 1954
- Launched: 18 October 1955
- Commissioned: 12 December 1957
- Identification: Pennant number: F88
- Fate: Scrapped in 1978

General characteristics
- Class & type: Blackwood-class frigate
- Displacement: 1,180 tons
- Length: 310 ft 0 in (94.49 m)
- Beam: 33 ft (10 m)
- Draught: 15 ft (4.6 m)
- Propulsion: Two Babcock & Wilcox 550psi boilers were fitted with two English Electric steam turbines producing a total of 15,000 shp (11 MW) on one shaft
- Speed: 28 knots (52 km/h)
- Range: 5,200 nmi (9,630 km) at 12 kn (22 km/h)
- Complement: 140
- Sensors & processing systems: Radar: Type 978 navigation; Sonar: Type 162 target classification; Sonar: Type 170 attack; Sonar: Type 174 search
- Armament: 3 × 40 mm Mk9 Bofors guns in single mountings; 4 × 21 in (533 mm) torpedo tubes in twin mountings; 2 × Limbo Anti-submarine mortars

HMS Malcolm was a Blackwood-class, one of a dozen second-rate anti-submarine frigates built for the Royal Navy in the 1950s. She was commissioned on 12 December 1957 and decommissioned in 1978. She was the second Royal Navy ship to be bear the name, and was named after Admiral Sir Pulteney Malcolm, who served during the French Revolutionary and Napoleonic Wars.

== The Cod Wars ==
Just after she was commissioned, a dispute started in the North Atlantic. Relations between the United Kingdom and Iceland deteriorated and there was concern that the Landhelgisgæsla (the Icelandic Coast Guard) might threaten British fishermen.

Ensign of the Landhelgisgæsla

Malcolm joined the Fishery Patrol Squadron in April 1959, continuing on these duties until 1965. Malcolm was part of a five-ship group that was deployed to Iceland for fishery protection duties in what became known as the Cod Wars. She operated out of Edinburgh during the first Cod War, and from Rosyth after that.

Malcolm was refitted at Rosyth from February 1965 until March 1966, when she rejoined the Fishery Patrol Squadron. In 1967 (Note: February according to Critchley, March according to Navy News.) Malcolm joined the 20th Frigate Squadron based at Londonderry. Duties included training with submarines while continuing to carry out fishery protection patrols.

In December 1970, Kevin McNamara MP raised concerns that Malcolm would not be replaced by another frigate after its return to home waters, stressing that Malcolm's medical support was essential to fishing operations off Iceland. The Ministry of Defence decided not to replace Malcolm immediately, probably because the situation had calmed somewhat (1970 was between the first and second Cod Wars). Responsibility for supporting the fishing fleet was henceforth the Department of Trade and Industry's.

The dispute ended in 1976. Two years later, Malcolm was decommissioned. She was considered too small to act as a modern frigate and therefore unable to continue service into the 1980s.

== Publications ==
- Colledge, J. J.; Warlow, Ben (2006) [1969]. Ships of the Royal Navy: The Complete Record of All Fighting Ships of the Royal Navy from the 15th Century to the Present (3rd Rev ed.). London: Chatham Publishing. ISBN 978-1-86176-281-8. OCLC 67375475.
- Critchley, Mike (1992). British Warships Since 1945: Part 5: Frigates. Liskeard, UK: Maritime Press. ISBN 0-907771-13-0.
- Marriott, Leo (1983). Royal Navy Frigates 1945–1983. Ian Allan Ltd. ISBN 07110-1322-5.
