= HMS Blackwood (F78) =

1957 Type 14 or Blackwood-class frigate of the Royal Navy

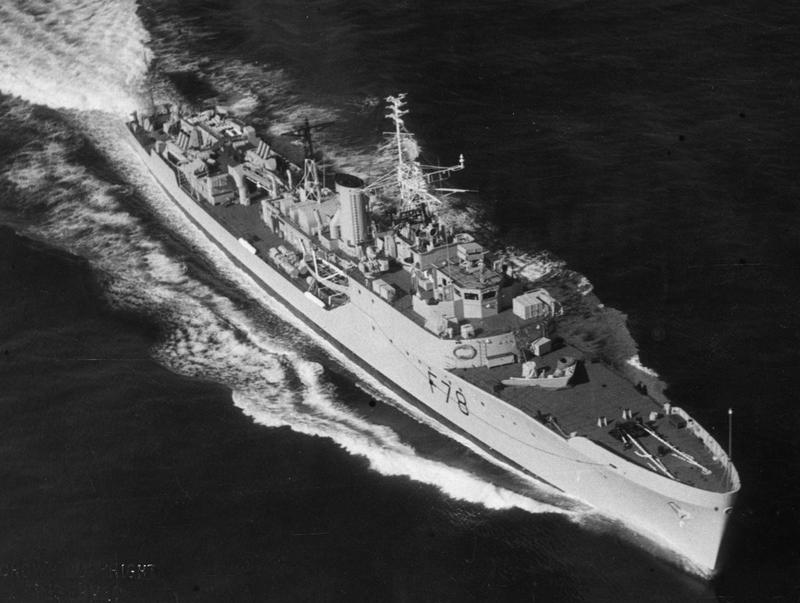
- HMS Blackwood, 30 August 1957 (IWM)

History

United Kingdom
- Name: HMS Blackwood
- Namesake: Henry Blackwood
- Builder: John I. Thornycroft & Company
- Laid down: 14 September 1953
- Launched: 4 October 1955
- Commissioned: 22 August 1957
- Identification: Pennant number: F78
- Fate: Broken up 1976

General characteristics
- Class & type: Blackwood-class frigate (Type 14 frigate)
- Displacement: 1,456 long tons (1,479 t) full load
- Length: 310 ft (94.5 m)
- Beam: 33 ft (10.1 m)
- Draught: 15 ft (4.6 m)
- Installed power: 2 × Babcock & Wilcox boilers; 15,000 shp (11 MW)
- Propulsion: 1 shaft; 1 steam turbine set
- Speed: 27 knots (50 km/h; 31 mph)
- Range: 5,200 nmi (9,600 km; 6,000 mi) at 12 knots (22 km/h; 14 mph)
- Complement: 140
- Sensors & processing systems: Radar Type 974 navigation; Sonar Type 174 search; Sonar Type 162 target classification; Sonar Type 170 targeting
- Armament: 3 × 40 mm Bofors guns; 2 × Limbo Mark 10 anti-submarine mortars; 2 × twin 21-inch (530 mm) torpedo tubes

HMS Blackwood was the name ship of her class (also known as the Type 14-class frigate) of second-rate anti-submarine frigates built for the Royal Navy in the 1950s.

== Description ==
The Blackwood class displaced 1,180 long tons (1,200 t) at standard load and 1,456 long tons (1,479 t) at deep load. They had an overall length of 310 feet (94.5 m), a beam of 33 feet (10.1 m) and a draught of 15 feet (4.6 m). The ships were powered by one English Electric geared steam turbine that drove the single propeller shaft, using steam provided by two Babcock & Wilcox boilers. The turbine developed a total of 15,000 shaft horsepower (11,000 kW) and gave a maximum speed of 27 knots (50 km/h; 31 mph). The Blackwoods had a range of 4,500 nautical miles (8,300 km; 5,200 mi) at 12 knots (22 km/h; 14 mph). Their complement was 140 officers and ratings.

The ships were armed with three Bofors 40 mm guns in single mounts. The mount on the quarterdeck was later removed as it was unusable in heavy seas. The first four ships to be completed, including Blackwood, were fitted with two above-water twin mounts for 21-inch (533 mm) anti-submarine homing torpedoes, but these were removed in the early 1960s. They were equipped with two triple-barrelled Limbo Mark 10 anti-submarine mortars. The Blackwood-class ships had the same sonar suite as the larger Whitby-class frigates where the Limbo mortars were controlled by three sonars, the Type 174 search set, Type 162 target-classification set and the Type 170 'pencil beam' targeting set to determine the bearing and depth of the target.

== Bibliography ==
- Colledge, J. J.; Warlow, Ben (2006) [1969]. Ships of the Royal Navy: The Complete Record of All Fighting Ships of the Royal Navy from the 15th Century to the Present (3rd Rev ed.). London: Chatham Publishing. ISBN 978-1-86176-281-8. OCLC 67375475.
- Friedman, Norman (2006). British Destroyers and Frigates, the Second World War and After. Annapolis, Maryland: Naval Institute Press. ISBN 1-86176-137-6.
- Gardiner, Robert; Chumbley, Stephen & Budzbon, Przemysław (1995). Conway's All the World's Fighting Ships 1947-1995. Annapolis, Maryland: Naval Institute Press. ISBN 1-55750-132-7.
- Marriott, Leo (1983). Royal Navy Frigates 1945-1983. Shepperton, Surrey, UK: Ian Allan. ISBN 0-7110-1322-5.
