= George Vallings =

Vice-Admiral Sir George Vallings KCB
- Born: 31 May 1932; Nairobi, Kenya
- Died: 25 December 2007 (aged 75)
- Military career
- Allegiance: United Kingdom
- Branch: Royal Navy
- Service years: 1950 – 1987
- Rank: Vice-Admiral
- Commands: HMS Defender; HMS Apollo; 2nd Frigate Squadron; Scotland and Northern Ireland
- Conflicts: Korean War; Suez Crisis
- Awards: Knight Commander of the Order of the Bath

Vice-Admiral Sir George Montague Francis Vallings KCB (31 May 1932 – 25 December 2007) was a Royal Navy officer who became Flag Officer, Scotland and Northern Ireland.

== Naval career ==
Educated at Belhaven Hill School in Dunbar and the Royal Naval College, Dartmouth, Vallings joined the Royal Navy as a midshipman in 1950 and took part in the Korean War. He also saw action in the Suez Crisis in 1956. He was then given command of the destroyer Defender in 1967 and became executive officer of the destroyer Bristol in 1970. He was made naval attaché at the British High Commission in Canberra in 1975, commanding officer of HMS Apollo as well as captain of the 2nd Frigate Squadron in 1977 and Director of Naval Operations and Trade under the Naval Staff at the Ministry of Defence from March 1978 to May 1980. He went on to be Commodore Clyde in 1980 and then Flag Officer Gibraltar in 1982. He was appointed Flag Officer, Scotland and Northern Ireland in 1985 before retiring in 1987.

In retirement he became Secretary of the Chartered Institute of Management Accountants.

== Family ==
In 1964 he married Tessa Julia Cousins; they had three sons.

Military offices
Preceded by Sir Nicholas Hunt	Flag Officer, Scotland and Northern Ireland; 1985–1987	Succeeded by Sir Jock Slater
