= HMS Pellew (F62) =

1956 Type 14 or Blackwood-class frigate of the Royal Navy

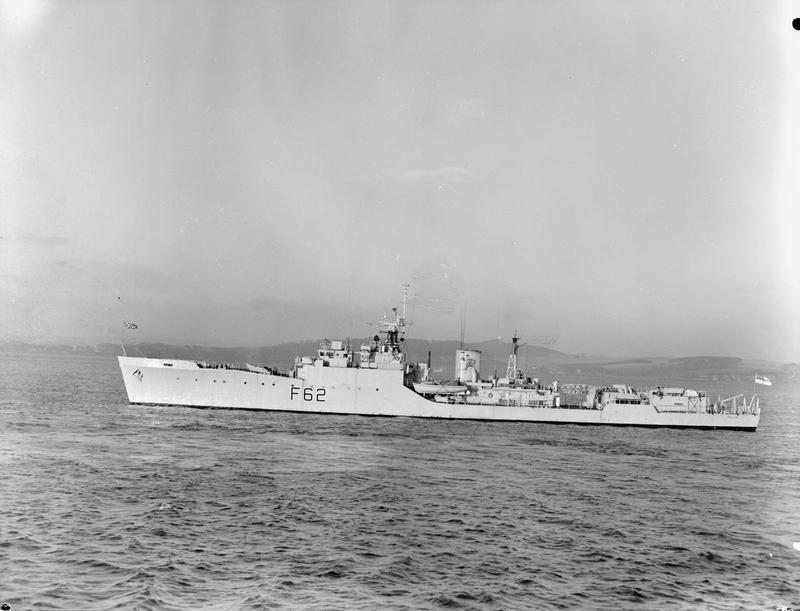
- Port view of Blackwood-class frigate HMS Pellew (F62). 18 December 1962 (IWM HU 129945)

History

United Kingdom
- Name: HMS Pellew
- Builder: Swan Hunter, Tyne and Wear, United Kingdom
- Laid down: 5 November 1953
- Launched: 29 September 1954
- Commissioned: 26 July 1956
- Identification: Pennant number: F62
- Fate: Broken up 1971 at Fleetwood

General characteristics
- Class & type: Blackwood-class frigate (Type 14 frigate)
- Displacement: 1,456 long tons (1,479 t) full load
- Length: 310 ft (94.5 m)
- Beam: 33 ft (10.1 m)
- Draught: 15 ft (4.6 m)
- Installed power: 2 × Babcock & Wilcox boilers; 15,000 shp (11 MW)
- Propulsion: 1 shaft; 1 steam turbine set
- Speed: 27 knots (50 km/h; 31 mph)
- Range: 5,200 nmi (9,600 km; 6,000 mi) at 12 knots (22 km/h; 14 mph)
- Complement: 140
- Sensors & processing systems: Radar Type 974 navigation; Sonar Type 174 search; Sonar Type 162 target classification; Sonar Type 170 targeting
- Armament: 3 × 40 mm Bofors guns; 2 × Limbo Mark 10 anti-submarine mortars

HMS Pellew (F62) was one of a dozen Blackwood-class frigate (also known as the Type 14 class) of second-rate anti-submarine frigates built for the Royal Navy in the 1950s. She was named for Israel Pellew, who served during the French Revolutionary and Napoleonic Wars. He was brother to Edward Pellew, 1st Viscount Exmouth

== Description ==
The Blackwood class displaced 1,180 long tons (1,200 t) at standard load and 1,456 long tons (1,479 t) at deep load. They had an overall length of 310 feet (94.5 m), a beam of 33 feet (10.1 m) and a draught of 15 feet (4.6 m). The ships were powered by one English Electric geared steam turbine that drove the single propeller shaft, using steam provided by two Babcock & Wilcox boilers. The turbine developed a total of 15,000 shaft horsepower (11,000 kW) and gave a maximum speed of 27 knots (50 km/h; 31 mph). The Blackwoods had a range of 4,500 nautical miles (8,300 km; 5,200 mi) at 12 knots (22 km/h; 14 mph). Their complement was 140 officers and ratings.

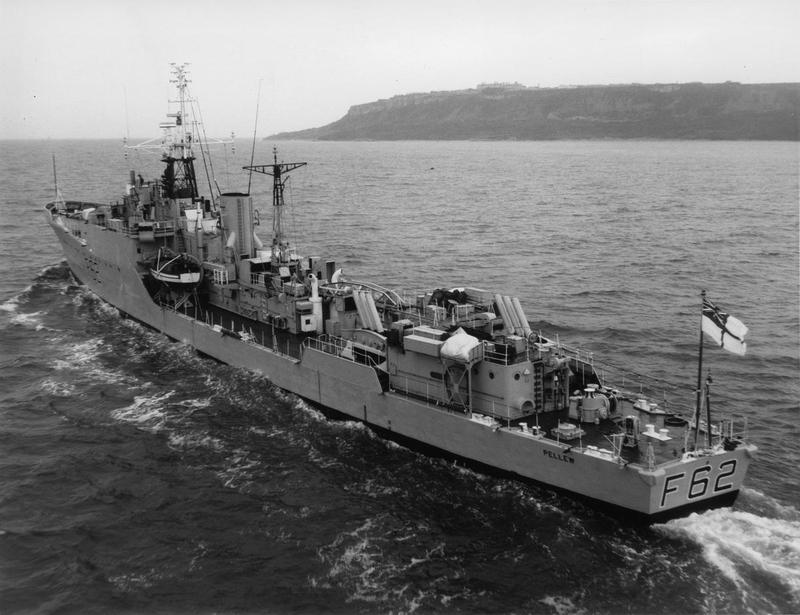
Rear view of Pellew showing the Limbo mortars, 23 February 1967 (IWM HU 129944)

The ships were armed with three Bofors 40 mm guns in single mounts. The mount on the quarterdeck was later removed as it was unusable in heavy seas. They were equipped with two triple-barrelled Limbo Mark 10 anti-submarine mortars. The Blackwood-class ships had the same sonar suite as the larger Whitby-class frigates where the Limbo mortars were controlled by three sonars, the Type 174 search set, Type 162 target-classification set and the Type 170 'pencil beam' targeting set to determine the bearing and depth of the target.

== Construction and career ==
The ship was named after Captain Sir Edward Pellew, later Viscount Exmouth. In 1965 Pellew was part of the 2nd Frigate Squadron based at Portland. Her peacetime role was the training of officers and ratings in anti-submarine warfare. Between 1964 and 1965 the ship visited Calais, Kiel, Flushing, Cherbourg and Jersey. She took part in Portsmouth 'Navy Days' in 1965.

She was adopted by the town of Teignmouth.

Broken up at Fleetwood, Lancashire, United Kingdom

== Bibliography ==
- Colledge, J. J.; Warlow, Ben (2006) [1969]. Ships of the Royal Navy: The Complete Record of All Fighting Ships of the Royal Navy from the 15th Century to the Present (3rd Rev ed.). London: Chatham Publishing. ISBN 978-1-86176-281-8. OCLC 67375475.
- Critchley, Mike (1986). British Warships Since 1945: Part 5: Frigates. Liskeard, UK: Maritime Books. ISBN 0-907771-13-0.
- Friedman, Norman (2006). British Destroyers and Frigates, the Second World War and After. Annapolis, Maryland: Naval Institute Press. ISBN 1-86176-137-6.
- Gardiner, Robert; Chumbley, Stephen & Budzbon, Przemysław (1995). Conway's All the World's Fighting Ships 1947–1995. Annapolis, Maryland: Naval Institute Press. ISBN 1-55750-132-7.
- Marriott, Leo (1983). Royal Navy Frigates 1945–1983. Shepperton, Surrey, UK: Ian Allan. ISBN 0-7110-1322-5.
