= HMS Exmouth (F84) =

1957 Type 14 or Blackwood-class frigate of the Royal Navy

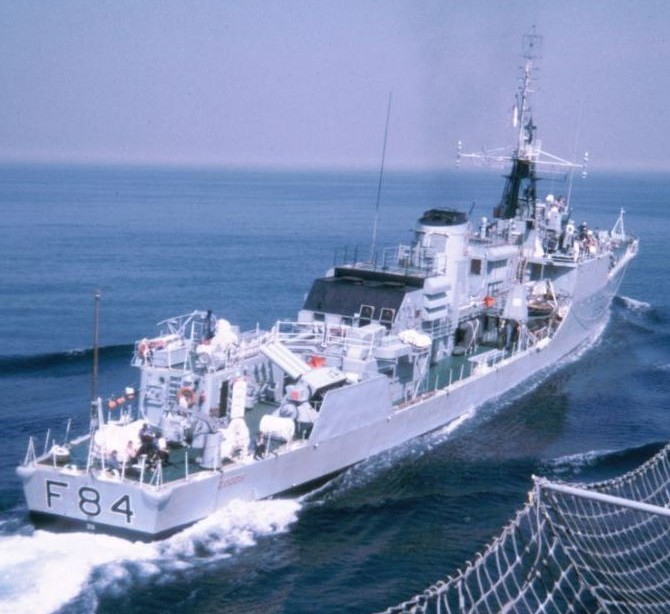
- HMS Exmouth

History

United Kingdom
- Name: HMS Exmouth
- Namesake: Edward Pellew, 1st Viscount Exmouth
- Builder: JS White and Co Ltd
- Laid down: 24 March 1954
- Launched: 16 November 1955
- Acquired: December 1957
- Commissioned: 20 December 1957
- Identification: Pennant number: F84
- Fate: Broken up in 1979

General characteristics
- Class & type: Blackwood-class frigate
- Displacement: 1,456 tons (1,479 tonnes) full load
- Length: 310 ft (94 m)
- Beam: 33 ft (10 m)
- Draught: 15 ft (4.6 m)
- Propulsion: Y-100 plant; 2 × Babcock & Wilcox boilers; steam turbines on single shaft; 15,000 shp (11 MW)
- Speed: 27 knots (50 km/h)
- Range: 5,200 nautical miles (9,630 km) at 12 knots (22 km/h)
- Complement: 112
- Sensors & processing systems: Radar Type 974 navigation; Sonar Type 174 search; Sonar Type 162 target classification; Sonar Type 170 targeting
- Armament: 3 × 40 mm Bofors gun Mark 7 (quarterdeck mount later removed); 2 × Limbo Mark 10 anti-submarine mortars

HMS Exmouth was a Royal Navy anti-submarine warfare frigate of the Blackwood or Type 14 class. She was launched in 1955 and commissioned in 1957.

In 1966 she returned to the docks for a refit which replaced the original steam boilers and turbine propulsion system with an experimental system powered entirely by gas turbines. She returned to duty in 1968, as the first UK ship powered entirely by gas turbine.

== Service history ==
Exmouth became the first major British warship to be powered by gas turbine engines alone when, in 1966, she was taken in hand and was refitted with a combined gas or gas (COGOG) arrangement. The main reason behind the conversion of Exmouth was to trial the (then) new Marine Olympus which had been selected as the turbine for the Type 82 destroyer and the Type 19 high-speed anti-submarine frigate. Therefore, she was fitted with a Bristol Siddeley Olympus TM1 of 24,000 shp (limited to 15,000 shp (11,000 kW) due to gearbox and shaft limitations) for full power and two Bristol Siddeley Proteus 10M (3,500 shp each) for fuel-efficient cruising. These engines drove the single shaft through a common gearbox. The Proteus engines could work alone or together, but could not be run together with the Olympus. As the engines could not run in reverse, a reversible-pitch propeller was installed. As the engines could be controlled directly from throttles on the bridge, bridge steering was fitted. The requisite air intakes and filters were grouped amidships and the turbine uptakes exhausted into a common, streamlined funnel, completely changing Exmouth's appearance. The exhaust and intake trunking was also utilised to allow the removal of complete engines, giving a rapid 24-hour exchange time.

Exmouth rejoined the fleet on 5 June 1968, and during the 1970s she carried out extended trials to validate the feasibility of all-gas turbine propulsion. The foresight of her conversion was illustrated when after only 64 hours of running, an entire ring of Olympus turbine blades failed. Her test cruises took her to the Mediterranean Sea, where she took part in various trials and exercises based at Malta. She proceeded to Crete which made her the only Type 14 to get this far east. She acted as plane guard for the aircraft carrier Ark Royal and was involved in the search for survivors when a Russian destroyer lost 3 men overboard when making a close pass ahead of Ark Royal whilst the latter was at flying stations (the men were never found). She eventually returned to her home base port of Chatham in Kent. She then went to the Isle of Portland as a day runner in the 2nd Frigate Squadron, providing support for ships working-up under Flag Officer Sea Training. This was to prove her propulsion in a stop/start scenario – basically press the button, start the engines and sail – which was much less time-consuming than flashing up a steam plant.

The trials were ultimately successful, and allowed the trouble-free introduction of the Olympus into naval service in the Type 42 destroyer and the Type 21 and two batches of Type 22 frigates. The Olympus was also an export success, and Exmouth's COGOG arrangement was also widely emulated. Exmouth was broken up in 1979.

== Publications ==
- Colledge, J. J.; Warlow, Ben (2006) [1969]. Ships of the Royal Navy: The Complete Record of All Fighting Ships of the Royal Navy from the 15th Century to the Present (3rd Rev ed.). London: Chatham Publishing. ISBN 978-1-86176-281-8. OCLC 67375475.
- Marriott, Leo (1983). Royal Navy Frigates 1945–1983. Ian Allan Ltd. ISBN 07110-1322-5.
