= Blackwood-class frigate =

Class of anti-submarine warfare frigates built for the Royal Navy

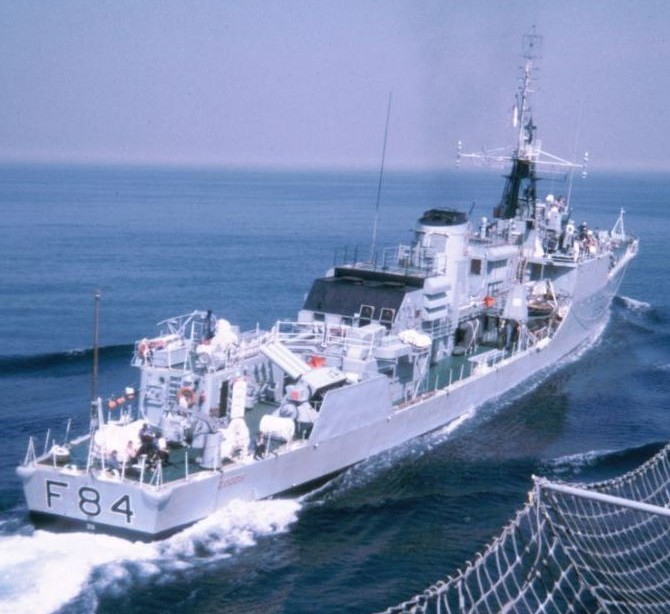
- HMS Exmouth (1972) – following conversion to gas turbine propulsion

Class overview
- Name: Type 14 or Blackwood class
- Builders: Swan Hunter, Wallsend; Yarrow Shipbuilders, Scotstoun; John I. Thornycroft & Co., Woolston; Alexander Stephen and Sons, Govan; J. Samuel White, Cowes
- Operators: Royal Navy; Indian Navy; Indian Coast Guard
- In service: 1955 (RN) – 1988 (ICG)
- Completed: 15
- Lost: 1 (+1 as target)

General characteristics
- Type: Anti-submarine frigate
- Displacement: 1,456 long tons (1,479 t) full load
- Length: 310 ft (94.5 m)
- Beam: 33 ft (10.1 m)
- Draught: 15 ft (4.6 m)
- Installed power: 2 × Babcock & Wilcox boilers; 15,000 shp (11 MW)
- Propulsion: 1 shaft; 1 steam turbine set; Exmouth, from 1966: COGOG, 1 × Rolls-Royce Olympus boost and 2 × Rolls-Royce Proteus cruise gas turbines.
- Speed: 27 knots (50 km/h; 31 mph)
- Range: 5,200 nmi (9,600 km; 6,000 mi) at 12 knots (22 km/h; 14 mph)
- Complement: 112
- Sensors & processing systems: Radar Type 974 navigation; Sonar Type 174 search; Sonar Type 162 target classification; Sonar Type 170 targeting
- Armament: 3 × 40 mm Bofors gun Mark 7 (quarterdeck mount later removed); 2 × Limbo Mark 10 anti-submarine mortars; 2 × twin 21-inch (533 mm) deck-mounted tubes for anti-submarine homing torpedoes (Blackwood, Exmouth, Malcolm and Palliser only, later removed)

The Type 14 Blackwood class were a ship class of minimal "second-rate" anti-submarine warfare frigates. Built for the Royal Navy during the 1950s at a time of increasing threat from the Soviet Union's submarine fleet, they served until the late 1970s. Twelve ships of this class served with the Royal Navy and a further three were built for the Indian Navy.

== Design ==
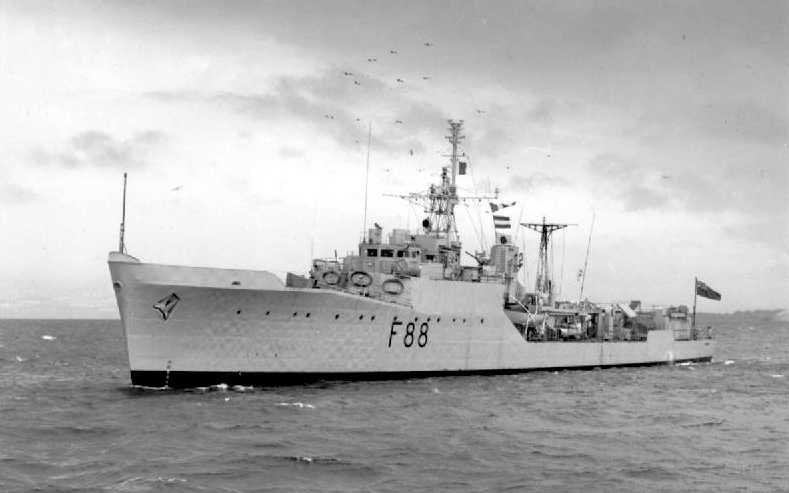
HMS Malcolm

The Type 14 frigates were designed to be cheaper and smaller than the expensive Type 12 frigates. Although they lacked gun armament, their anti-submarine armament of two Limbo mortars, Mk 20 torpedoes and sonar fit equalled the larger Type 12, and as the crews of the Type 14 concentrated almost entirely on practising anti-submarine warfare, they were often the most effective frigates in anti-submarine exercises until the mid-1960s. The class were entirely specialised for the anti-submarine role and hence had little capability in any other, though they did perform fishery protection duties during the confrontations with Iceland over fishing rights.

In the late 1950s, during their time on patrols around Iceland to ensure that Iceland did not interfere with British fishermen's attempts to fish, problems were found with the hulls of the Type 14s in such heavy waters, so that their hulls had to be strengthened to cope with these patrols. However, they proved to be good sea boats throughout the dispute, which continued into the mid-1970s. The low profile of the superstructure was a deliberate design feature to confuse enemy attackers. The Type 14 design was flawed by the lack of a gun, and also by general lack of space. After experience with these frigates, the Admiralty decided that quality was the top priority of all ships, even though it meant having a smaller fleet.

One of the ships, Exmouth, was later converted 1966–1968 to act as experimental trials vessel for gas turbine propulsion, becoming the first major warship of the Royal Navy to be entirely powered by gas turbines. In this configuration she was easily distinguishable from other members of the class due to her larger (non-cylindrical, streamlined) funnel and large air intakes sited immediately fore and aft of the funnel. The success of these trials led to the adoption of all-gas turbine propulsion as standard on subsequent Royal Navy warship designs (Type 21 & 22 Frigates, Type 42 destroyers, 'Invincible' class carriers).

== Service ==
The Type 14s' limited size, at just 310 feet (94 m), restricted them from operating past the 1970s as anti-submarine ships. Their small hull limited the extent of modifications and upgrades possible, preventing the Type 14s from being armed with more effective weapons, effectively rendering them obsolete. All were decommissioned in the 1970s. The last operational were the gas powered Exmouth in 1977 and Hardy which attended the Silver Jubilee of Elizabeth II in 1977 and deployed again from the standby squadron in 1978.

=== In film ===
The 1960 Norman Wisdom film The Bulldog Breed was made in Portland harbour with co-operation from the Royal Navy, and features several of the Blackwood-class frigates. An early scene shows a flotilla of Type 14s led by Murray. The 1958 British comedy Further Up The Creek features the fictional HMS Aristotle, a type 14 frigate. HMS Pellew (F62) appeared in 1961 British monster movie Gorgo. HMS Dundas appeared in the Ava Gardner film The Little Hut in 1957.

== Ships ==
=== Royal Navy ===
The Royal Navy ships were all named after British captains. Many had been in the Napoleonic wars and some were present at the Battle of Trafalgar.

- Blackwood – Henry Blackwood
- Duncan – Adam Duncan
- Dundas – James Whitley Deans Dundas
- Exmouth – Edward Pellew, 1st Viscount Exmouth
- Grafton – Henry FitzRoy, 1st Duke of Grafton
- Hardy – Thomas Hardy
- Keppel – Augustus Keppel
- Malcolm – Pulteney Malcolm
- Murray – George Murray
- Palliser – Hugh Palliser
- Pellew – Israel Pellew
- Russell – Thomas McNamara Russell

=== Indian Navy ===
Three ships were built for the Indian Navy in the late 1950s

- Khukri, sunk by the Pakistani submarine PNS Hangor on 8 December 1971 during the Indo-Pakistani War of 1971
- Kirpan
- Kuthar

== Construction programme ==
Navy	Pennant	Name	(a) Hull builder (b) Main machinery manufacturers	Laid down	Launched	Accepted into service	Commissioned	Estimated building cost	Fate
Royal Navy	F54	Hardy	(a) & (b) Yarrow and Co Ltd, Scotstoun, Glasgow	4 February 1953	25 November 1953	8 December 1955	15 December 1955	£1,449,000	Operational to 1977, final active deployment from standby squadron in 1978, sunk as target 1984.
Royal Navy	F48	Dundas	(a) & (b) JS White and Co Ltd, Cowes, Isle of Wight	17 October 1952	25 September 1953	March 1956	16 March 1956	£1,434,000	Broken up 1983.
Royal Navy	F91	Murray	(a) & (b) Alexander Stephen and Sons Ltd, Glasgow	30 November 1953	22 February 1955	5 June 1956	5 June 1956	£1,625,000	Broken up 1970.
Royal Navy	F85	Keppel	(a) & (b) Yarrow and Co Ltd, Scotstoun, Glasgow	27 March 1953	31 August 1954	6 July 1956	6 July 1956	£1,506,000	Broken up 1979.
Royal Navy	F62	Pellew	(a) Swan, Hunter & Wigham Richardson Ltd, Wallsend-on-Tyne (b) The Wallsend Slipway & Engineering Co Ltd, Wallsend-on-Tyne	5 November 1953	29 September 1954	26 July 1956	26 July 1956	£1,548,000	Broken up 1971.
Royal Navy	F51	Grafton	(a) & (b) JS White and Co Ltd, Cowes, Isle of Wight	25 February 1953	13 February 1954	8 January 1957	8 January 1957	£1,411,000	Broken up 1971.
Royal Navy	F97	Russell	(a) Swan, Hunter & Wigham Richardson Ltd, Wallsend-on-Tyne (b) The Wallsend Slipway & Engineering Co Ltd, Wallsend-on-Tyne	11 November 1953	10 December 1954	7 February 1957	7 February 1957	£1,581,000	Broken up 1985.
Royal Navy	F78	Blackwood	(a) & (b) JI Thornycroft and Co Ltd, Woolston, Southampton	14 September 1953	4 October 1955	August 1957	22 August 1957	£1,769,000	Broken up 1976.
Royal Navy	F88	Malcolm	(a) Yarrow and Co Ltd, Scotstoun, Glasgow (b) Parsons Marine Steam Turbine Co, Wallsend-on-Tyne	1 February 1954	18 October 1955	December 1957	12 December 1957	£1,582,000	Broken up 1978.
Royal Navy	F94	Palliser	(a) & (b) Alexander Stephen and Sons Ltd, Glasgow	15 March 1955	10 May 1956	December 1957	13 December 1957	£1,620,000	Broken up 1983.
Royal Navy	F84	Exmouth	(a) & (b) JS White and Co Ltd, Cowes, Isle of Wight	24 March 1954	16 November 1955	December 1957	20 December 1957	£1,422,000	Broken up 1979.
Royal Navy	F80	Duncan	(a) & (b) JI Thornycroft and Co Ltd, Woolston, Southampton	17 December 1953	30 May 1957	October 1958	21 October 1958	£1,960,000	Broken up 1985.
Indian Navy	F149	Khukri	(a) & (b) JS White and Co Ltd, Cowes, Isle of Wight	29 December 1955	20 November 1956		16 July 1958		Torpedoed and sunk by the Pakistan submarine Hangor 9 December 1971.
Indian Navy	F144	Kirpan	(a) & (b) Alexander Stephen and Sons Ltd, Glasgow	5 November 1956	19 August 1958		July 1959		Transferred to Coast Guard Service 1978. Decommissioned 1987.
Indian Navy	F146	Kuthar	(a) & (b) JS White and Co Ltd, Cowes, Isle of Wight	19 September 1957	14 October 1958		November 1959		Transferred to Coast Guard Service 1978. Decommissioned September 1988.

== See also ==
- List of frigate classes by country

Equivalent frigates of the same era

- Van Amstel class
- Riga class
- Centauro class
- Azopardo class

== Publications ==
- Purvis, M.K., 'Post War RN Frigate and Guided Missile Destroyer Design 1944–1969', Transactions, Royal Institution of Naval Architects (RINA), 1974
- Marriott, Leo, 'Royal Navy Frigates Since 1945', Second Edition, ISBN 0-7110-1915-0, Published by Ian Allan Ltd (Surrey, UK), 1990
- Colledge, J. J.; Warlow, Ben (2006) [1969]. Ships of the Royal Navy: The Complete Record of All Fighting Ships of the Royal Navy from the 15th Century to the Present (3rd Rev ed.). London: Chatham Publishing. ISBN 978-1-86176-281-8. OCLC 67375475.
- "Indian Navy - Blackwood Class Type 14 Frigates". Marine News Supplement: Warships. 76 (5): S277–S281. May 2022. ISSN 0966-6958.
