= HMS Hardy (F54) =

1955 Type 14 or Blackwood-class frigate of the Royal Navy

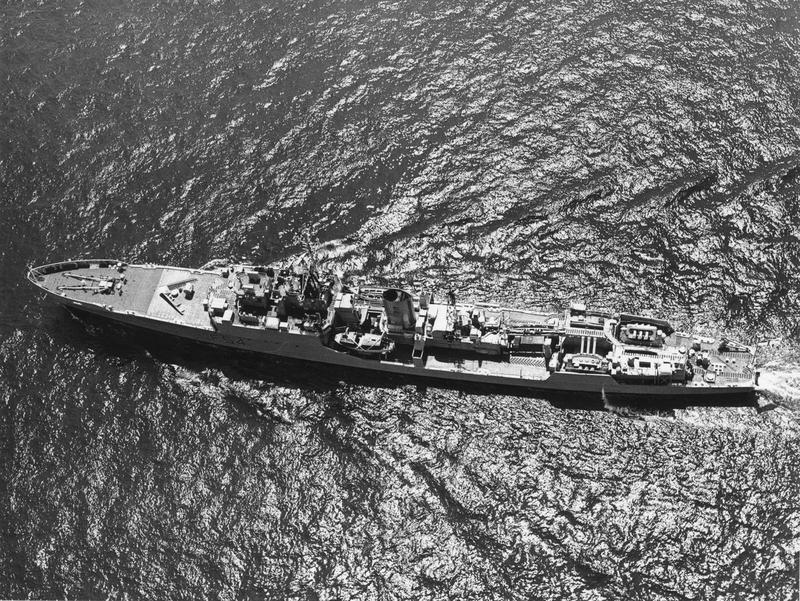
- HMS Hardy (F54), 14 July 1969 (IWM HU 129855)

History

United Kingdom
- Name: HMS Hardy
- Namesake: Thomas Masterman Hardy
- Builder: Yarrow Shipbuilders
- Laid down: 4 February 1953
- Launched: 25 November 1953
- Acquired: 8 December 1955
- Commissioned: 15 December 1955
- Identification: Pennant number: F54
- Fate: Sunk as target 3 July 1984

General characteristics
- Class & type: Blackwood-class frigate
- Displacement: 1,456 tons (1,479 tonnes) full load
- Length: 310 ft (94 m)
- Beam: 33 ft (10 m)
- Draught: 15 ft (4.6 m)
- Propulsion: Y-100 plant; 2 × Babcock & Wilcox boilers; steam turbines on single shaft; 15,000 shp (11 MW)
- Speed: 27 knots (50 km/h)
- Range: 5,200 nautical miles (9,630 km) at 12 knots (22 km/h)
- Complement: 112
- Sensors & processing systems: Radar Type 974 navigation; Sonar Type 174 search; Sonar Type 162 target classification; Sonar Type 170 targeting
- Armament: 3 × 40 mm Bofors gun Mark 7 (quarterdeck mount later removed); 2 × Limbo Mark 10 anti-submarine mortars

HMS Hardy was an anti-submarine warfare frigate of the Blackwood class or Type 14. She was named after Thomas Masterman Hardy, Captain of HMS Victory at Trafalgar. Hardy was the first Type 14 frigate built, completed on 8 December 1955, by Yarrow Shipbuilders.

== Operational Service ==
On commissioning Hardy served in the Third Training Squadron at Londonderry Port before transferring to the Second Training Squadron in Portland in 1957. In 1960 she underwent a major modernisation and refit, before joining the Twentieth Frigate Squadron in Londonderry Port. In 1967 Hardy transferred to the Second Frigate Squadron and attended Portsmouth Navy Days. The after 40 mm guns in these ships were removed early in their careers due to hull strengthening problems.

Icelandic Patrol and the First Cod War.

In January 1977, when the United Kingdom enlarged its Exclusive economic zone to 200 nautical miles (370 km), Hardy was deployed on patrols of the EEZ, protecting fishing stocks and oil fields. Serving mainly in the Londonderry Port and Portland areas, Hardy attended the 1977 Silver Jubilee Fleet Review off Spithead when she was part of the 2nd Frigate Squadron.

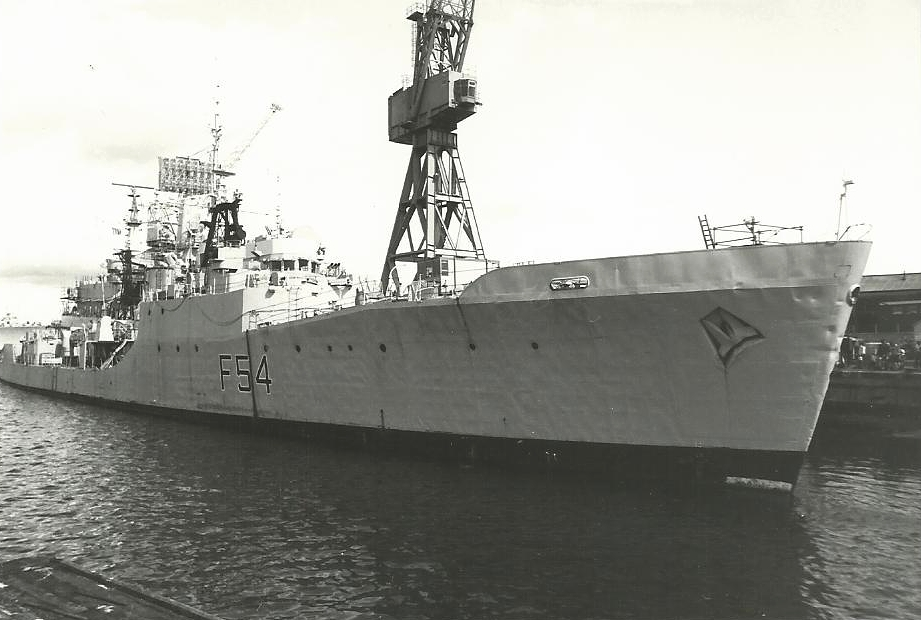
"HMS Hardy", Portsmouth Navy days, August 1982. At this time "Hardy" was the last Type 14 frigate in the reserve fleet but unlike other frigates in reserve at that time, was not refitted for the Falklands Relief Fleet, she being deemed of limited value by this time.

She paid off to the Standby Squadron in August 1977, then, after another short spell of operational service at Portland, became a stores accommodation ship in Portsmouth in October 1979.

In 1984, Hardy was used as a target ship for a Sinking Exercise (SINKEX). Having been struck by Exocet and Sea Skua missiles, her bow was blown off by a torpedo. Following being shelled by 4.5" rounds and receiving patterns of anti submarine mortar charges set to shallow depth, both the main portion of the ship and the separated bow section were finally sunk, by the use of 20mm cannons fired from HMS Charybdis, in the Western Approaches 3 July 1984.

== Publications ==
- Colledge, J. J.; Warlow, Ben (2006) [1969]. Ships of the Royal Navy: The Complete Record of All Fighting Ships of the Royal Navy from the 15th Century to the Present (3rd Rev ed.). London: Chatham Publishing. ISBN 978-1-86176-281-8. OCLC 67375475.
- Marriott, Leo (1983). Royal Navy Frigates 1945-1983. Ian Allan Ltd. ISBN 07110 1322 5.
