= HMS Russell (F97) =

1957 Type 14 or Blackwood-class frigate of the Royal Navy

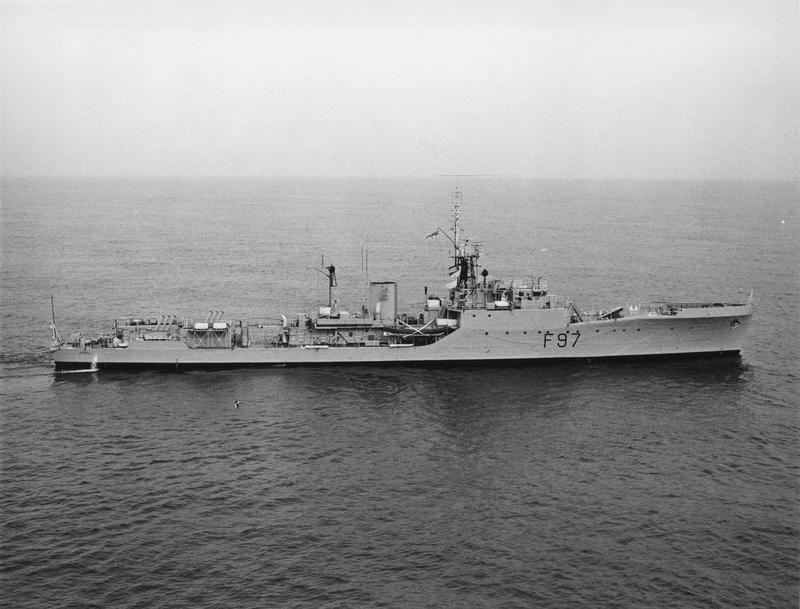
- HMS Russell at sea in 1972

History

United Kingdom
- Name: HMS Russell
- Builder: Swan Hunter, Tyne and Wear, United Kingdom
- Laid down: 11 November 1953
- Launched: 10 December 1954
- Commissioned: 7 February 1957
- Identification: Pennant number: F97
- Fate: Broken up 1985

General characteristics
- Class & type: Blackwood-class frigate
- Displacement: 1,456 long tons (1,479 t) fll load
- Length: 310 ft (94 m)
- Beam: 33 ft (10 m)
- Draught: 15 ft (4.6 m)
- Propulsion: Y-100 plant; 2 × Babcock & Wilcox boilers; steam turbines on single shaft; 15,000 shp (11 MW)
- Speed: 27 knots (50 km/h)
- Range: 5,200 nautical miles (9,630 km) at 12 knots (22 km/h)
- Complement: 112
- Sensors & processing systems: Radar Type 974 navigation; Sonar Type 174 search; Sonar Type 162 target classification; Sonar Type 170 targeting
- Armament: 3 × 40 mm Bofors gun Mark 7 (quarterdeck mount later removed); 2 × Limbo Mark 10 anti-submarine mortars

HMS Russell was one of a dozen Blackwood-class frigates (also known as the Type 14) of second-rate anti-submarine frigates built for the British Royal Navy during the 1950s. She was named for Edward Russell, 1st Earl of Orford, commander at the Battle of Barfleur in 1692.

== Service ==
On commissioning in 1957 Russell joined the Second Training Squadron, based at Portland. In January 1958 she joined the Fishery Protection Squadron where she served until April 1963, seeing service in the Cod Wars. On 4 September 1960, ICGV Ægir, an Icelandic patrol vessel, attempted to take a British fishing trawler off the Westfjords. The attempt was thwarted when Russell intervened, and the two vessels collided.

On 12 November 1960, Þór encountered the trawler Hackness which was fishing in international waters. Hackness did not stop until Þór had fired two blanks and one live shell off its bow. Once again, Russell came to assist the trawler and its shipmaster ordered the Icelandic captain to leave the trawler alone as it was not within the 4 nmi (7.4 km) limit recognised by the British government. Þór's captain, Eiríkur Kristófersson, said that he would not do so, and ordered his men to approach the trawler with the gun manned. In response, Russell threatened to sink the Icelandic boat if it opened fire upon Hackness. More British ships then arrived and Hackness retreated.

Following a refit at Rosyth she joined the 20th Frigate Squadron based at Londonderry Port. She was also used for anti-submarine training. In 1966 she was present at Portsmouth Navy Days.

== Publications ==
- Colledge, J. J.; Warlow, Ben (2006) [1969]. Ships of the Royal Navy: The Complete Record of All Fighting Ships of the Royal Navy from the 15th Century to the Present (3rd Rev ed.). London: Chatham Publishing. ISBN 978-1-86176-281-8. OCLC 67375475.
- Critchley, Mike (1992). British Warships Since 1945: Part 5: Frigates. Liskeard, UK: Maritime Press. ISBN 0-907771-13-0.
- Manning, T. D.; Walker, C. F. (1959). British Warship Names. London: Putnam.
- Marriott, Leo (1983). Royal Navy Frigates 1945-1983. Ian Allan Ltd. ISBN 07110-1322-5.
