= 2nd Frigate Squadron (United Kingdom) =

- Active: November 1947 – March 2002
- Country: United Kingdom
- Branch: Royal Navy
- Size: Squadron

Commanders
- First: Captain William G. Crawford
- Last: Captain Steven R. Kirby

The 2nd Frigate Squadron was an administrative unit of the Royal Navy from 1947 to 2002.

== Operational history ==
During its existence, the squadron included Black Swan-class, Type 15, Type 16, Leander-class and Type 22 frigates. The squadron was based at HMNB Devonport.

=== Silver Jubilee 1977 ===
At the Silver Jubilee Fleet Review, 24–29 June 1977, 2nd Frigate Squadron comprised:

- HMS Apollo (F70) – Capt G. M. F. Vallings, RN (Captain Second Frigate Squadron)
- HMS Hardy (F54) – Lt Cdr M. J. Larmuth, RN
- HMS Torquay (F43) – Lt Cdr M. H. Rhodes, RN
- HMS Dundas (F48) – Lt Cdr W. J. Christie, RN

=== Disbandment 2002 ===
In its last configuration, the squadron comprised the Type 22 frigates Cornwall (Captain F), Cumberland, Campbeltown and Chatham. The squadron was disbanded in March 2002 under the Royal Navy's "Fleet First" reorganization.

== Squadron commander ==
Name	Ship	Dates
Captain William G. Crawford	HMS Pelican	November 1947-September 1949
Captain Christopher D. Bonham-Carter	HMS Pelican	September 1949 – 1951
Captain Alwyn D. Lenox-Conyngham	HMS Mermaid	September 1952-January 1954
Captain Alexander H.C. Gordon Lennox	HMS Mermaid	January 1954 – 1955
Captain Edward L. Cook	HMS Teazer	December 1958-January 1960
Captain Edward W. Briggs	HMS Teazer	January 1960-August 1961
Captain Ian W. McLaughlan	HMS Whirlwind	August 1961-December 1962
Captain Raymond P. Dannreuther	HMS Undaunted	December 1962-November 1963
Captain Geoffrey C. Mitchell	HMS Aurora	November 1963-December 1965
Captain Bernard H. Notley	HMS Aurora	December 1965-June 1967
Captain A. Desmond Cassidi	HMS Undaunted	June 1967-December 1968
Captain Brian C.G. Hutchings	HMS Undaunted	December 1968-May 1970
Captain John B. Robathan	HMS Undaunted	May 1970-September 1971
Captain R. Michael Burgoyne	HMS Undaunted	September 1971-November 1973
Captain Linley E. Middleton	HMS Undaunted/HMS Apollo	November 1973-April 1975
Captain Richard A. Stephens	HMS Apollo	April 1975-January 1977
Captain George M.F. Vallings	HMS Apollo	January 1977-February 1978
Captain James W.F. Briggs	HMS Apollo/HMS Diomede	February 1978-October 1979
Captain Anthony J. Dunn	HMS Diomede	October 1979-May 1981
Captain Anthony M.G. Pearson	HMS Broadsword	May–October 1981
Captain William R. Canning	HMS Broadsword	October 1981-October 1982
Captain Robert McQueen	HMS Broadsword	October 1982-October 1983
Captain Anthony M. Norman	HMS Broadsword	October 1983-April 1985
Captain Geoffrey R.W. Biggs	HMS Broadsword	April 1985-May 1986
Captain Brian W. Turner	HMS Broadsword	May 1986-October 1987
Captain Colin H.D. Cooke-Priest	HMS Brilliant	December 1987-February 1989
Captain Richard F. Cobbold	HMS Brilliant	February 1989 – 1990
Captain Tobin D. Elliott	HMS Brilliant	1990-1992
Captain James M. Burnell-Nugent	HMS Brilliant	1992-1993
Captain Charles J. Freeman	HMS Cornwall	1993-1994
Captain Geoffrey K. Billson	HMS Cornwall	1994-1996
Captain Anthony K. Dymock	HMS Cornwall	1996-1998
Captain James C. Rapp	HMS Cornwall	1998-1999
Captain Timothy P. McClement	HMS Cornwall	1999-2001
Captain Steven R. Kirby	HMS Cornwall	2001-March 2002

== See also ==
- List of squadrons and flotillas of the Royal Navy
