= Limbo (weapon) =

Type of anti-submarine mortar

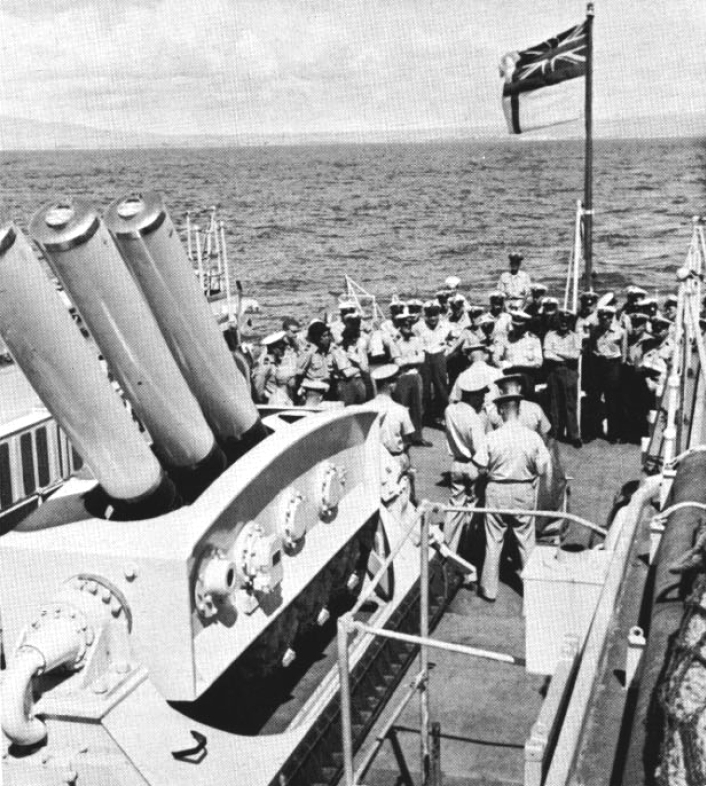
- A Limbo mortar on HMNZS Taranaki (F148)
- Type: Anti-submarine mortar
- Place of origin: United Kingdom

Service history
- In service: 1955–1980s
- Used by: Royal Navy; Royal Australian Navy; Royal Canadian Navy; Libyan Navy; South African Navy
- Wars: Falklands War

Production history
- Designer: Admiralty Underwater Weapons Establishment

Specifications
- Crew: 3
- Shell: 400 lb depth charge
- Calibre: 12 inches (30 cm)
- Barrels: 3
- Effective firing range: 400 yards (366 m) to 1,000 yards (914 m)
- Warhead: Minol
- Warhead weight: 94 kilograms (207 lb)
- Detonation mechanism: Proximity and/or time
- Guidance system: Type 170 sonar

Limbo, or Anti Submarine Mortar Mark 10 (A/S Mk.10), was the final development of the forward-throwing anti-submarine weapon Squid, designed during the Second World War and was developed by the Admiralty Underwater Weapons Establishment in the 1950s.

Limbo was installed on the quarterdeck of Royal Navy escort ships from 1955 to the mid-1980s, Australian-built Daring-class destroyer and River-class destroyer escorts. Limbo was widely employed by the Royal Canadian Navy, being incorporated into all destroyer designs from the late 1950s to the early 1970s, including the St. Laurent, Restigouche, Mackenzie, Annapolis and Iroquois classes and the Type 12 President Class frigates built for the South African Navy in the 1960s.

== Operation ==
Limbo was loaded and fired automatically with the crew under cover and was stabilised in pitch and roll. The firing distance of the mortars was controlled by opening gas vents; rounds could be fired from 400 to 1,000 yards (370 to 910 m). The weapon was linked to the sonar system of the ship, firing on command when the target was in range. The rounds were projected so that they fell in a triangular pattern around the target in any direction around the ship.

The weapon was used in the 1982 Falklands War and remained in service in the Royal Navy and Commonwealth navies until the 1990s.

== Sonar control of the A/S Mortar Mk 10 ==
The firing of the Mortar Mk 10 was controlled by the Type 170 (and later the 502) attack sonar from the Sonar Control Room (SCR), which was generally located next to the operations room in the warship. The 170 sonar had three operators who maintained sonar contact with the target and aimed the weapon in bearing, range and depth. Firing was done by means of a pistol grip and trigger mounted to the deckhead.

== Surviving examples ==
- Explosion Museum of Naval Firepower, Gosport, Hampshire.
- Dutch Navy Museum, Den Helder, Netherlands.
- The Naval Museum of Alberta, Calgary, Alberta.

== General characteristics ==
- Total system weight: 35 tons including 51 projectiles (17 salvos).
