= SAS President Kruger =

President-class Type 12 frigate built in the United Kingdom for the South African Navy

Coordinates: 35°15′S 17°21′E

- President Kruger leaving New York City in July 1976 after the United States Bicentennial celebrations

History

South Africa
- Name: President Kruger
- Namesake: Paul Kruger
- Ordered: 18 September 1957
- Builder: Yarrow Shipbuilders, Scotstoun, Glasgow
- Launched: 20 October 1960
- Commissioned: 3 October 1962
- Identification: Pennant number: F150
- Nickname(s): 'PK'
- Fate: Sunk after a collision with Tafelberg, 18 February 1982

General characteristics (as built)
- Class & type: President-class frigate
- Displacement: 2,170 long tons (2,200 t) (standard load); 2,605 long tons (2,647 t) (deep load)
- Length: 370 ft 0 in (112.78 m)
- Beam: 41 ft 0 in (12.5 m)
- Draught: 17 ft 6 in (5.33 m) (deep load)
- Installed power: 2 Babcock & Wilcox boilers; 30,000 shp (22,000 kW)
- Propulsion: 2 × shafts; 2 × geared steam turbines
- Speed: 30 knots (56 km/h; 35 mph)
- Range: 4,500 nmi (8,300 km; 5,200 mi) at 12 knots (22 km/h; 14 mph)
- Complement: 214
- Sensors & processing systems: Type 162, 170, 177M sonars; Type 293Q surface-search radar; Type 262 and 275 gunnery radars; Type 277Q height-finding radar; Type 978 navigation radar
- Armament: 2 × triple Limbo anti-submarine mortars; 1 × twin 4.5-inch (114 mm) dual-purpose gun; 1 × twin 40 mm (1.6 in) Bofors AA gun

SAS President Kruger was the first of three President-class Type 12 frigates built in the United Kingdom for the South African Navy (SAN) during the 1960s. The ship spent most of her career training and made visits to foreign ports in Africa, Western Europe and the United States. In the late 1960s, she was modernized and equipped to operate a helicopter. In the mid-1970s, President Kruger played a minor role in the South African Border War, conducting patrol operations off the Angolan coast. The ship was placed in reserve in 1977, but was recommissioned in 1980. She sank on 18 February 1982 with the loss of 16 lives after colliding with her replenishment oiler, SAS Tafelberg, in the South Atlantic.

== Description ==
The President-class ships displaced 2,170 long tons (2,200 t) at standard load and 2,605 long tons (2,647 t) at deep load. They had an overall length of 370 ft 0 in (112.78 m), a beam of 41 ft 0 in (12.5 m) and a mean deep draught of 17 ft 6 in (5.33 m). The ships were powered by a pair of English Electric geared steam turbines, each driving one propeller shaft, using steam provided by two Babcock & Wilcox boilers. The turbines developed a total of 30,000 shaft horsepower (22,000 kW) which gave a maximum speed of 30 knots (56 km/h; 35 mph). They carried 309 long tons (314 t) of fuel oil that gave them a range of 4,500 nautical miles (8,300 km; 5,200 mi) at 12 knots (22 km/h; 14 mph). Their crew numbered 14 officers and 200 ratings.

The Presidents were armed with one twin-gun mount for QF 4.5-inch (114 mm) Mk V dual-purpose guns forward and one twin mount for 40-millimetre (1.6 in) Bofors anti-aircraft guns. For anti-submarine work, the ships were fitted with Type 162, 170, and 177M sonars for the pair of triple-barrelled Mk 10 Limbo anti-submarine mortars. They were equipped with a Type 293Q surface-search radar, Type 262 and 275 gunnery radars, Type 277Q height-finding radar and a Type 978 navigation radar.

By the mid-1960s, it was obvious that the sonars of the President class were capable of detecting submarines well outside the range of the Limbo anti-submarine mortars and the South Africans decided to follow the lead of the Royal Navy (RN) in giving them the ability to operate helicopters that could carry anti-submarine torpedoes or depth charges to a considerable distance from the ships. Therefore, the forward Limbo mortar was removed and its space was plated over to form a small flight deck. The Bofors mount, its director and the aft superstructure was replaced by a hangar for a Westland Wasp helicopter. Two single Bofors guns were positioned on the hangar roof and provisions were made for four 0.5-inch (12.7 mm) Browning machine guns. A pair of American 12.75-inch (324 mm) Mk 32 triple-barrelled anti-submarine torpedo tubes were added amidships and their electronics were upgraded, including the addition of a Thomson-CSF Jupiter early-warning radar atop a new mainmast. Unlike her sister ships who were upgraded after President Kruger, the ship retained her original fire-control system.

== Construction and career ==
Three President-class frigates were ordered by the South African Navy in the late 1950s following the Simonstown Agreement with the RN. The ship that became President Kruger was actually the second ship to be ordered of the three sisters and was ordered from Yarrow Shipbuilders on 18 September 1957 with the name President Steyn. The government wanted the first ship to be completed to receive the name of Paul Kruger, the first State President of the South African Republic, and a strike at the Alexander Stephens and Sons shipyard delayed the laying of that ship's keel. So she exchanged names with the first Yarrow-built ship which had already been laid down and became President Kruger. She was laid down at the Yarrow shipyard in Scotstoun, Glasgow on 6 April 1959. The ship was launched on 20 October 1960 by Margaret Biermann, wife of the Navy Chief of Staff, Rear-Admiral Hugo Biermann, and commissioned on 3 October 1962 with Captain M.R. Terry-Lloyd in command. During her working up period at HMNB Portsmouth, President Kruger went to the assistance of a disabled Norwegian freighter, SS Johan Collett on 5 February 1963. The ship's captain refused the offer of a tow, preferring to wait for a tugboat already en route. The frigate stood by and illuminated the freighter with her searchlight as the crew was taken off by the Saint Peter Port lifeboat of the RNLI. President Kruger departed England on 27 February and arrived in Cape Town on 28 March to be welcomed by the Minister of Defence J. J. Fouché and other notables. A year later, the ship participated in an arrival ceremony for her sister, President Pretorius on 26 September 1964. In the meantime, she participated in the training exercise Capex 63 with British and French warships in July–August 1963. In 1965 the British government decided to reduce Capex to a Weapons Training Period (Sanex) with only RN and SAN units participating, to minimise the appearance of cooperating with the apartheid government of South Africa.

In June 1966, President Kruger was sent to the assistance of the weather station at Marion Island in June after a fire destroyed most of the living quarters there. In September 1967, the 10th Frigate Flotilla, consisting of President Pretorius, President Kruger, and the newly commissioned replenishment oiler Tafelberg, participated in a Sanex with the British aircraft carrier Eagle, the frigate Loch Fada and the submarine Ambush. The following month, the flotilla sailed to Argentina on 24 October, to train with the Argentine Navy. They arrived back in South Africa on 27 November and President Kruger was paid off shortly afterwards to begin her modernization at Simon's Town Naval Dockyard.

This began on 29 January 1968 and was completed on 5 August 1969. A year later, the ship and President Pretorius exercised with a pair of Royal Navy frigates and submarines in July–August 1970. At the beginning of 1971, President Kruger was tasked to escort the newly commissioned, French-built submarine Maria van Riebeeck. She departed Simon's Town on 28 January and visited ports in Portuguese Angola, the Canary Islands, Portugal, and Italy before arriving at Toulon. On the return voyage, the ships visited Gibraltar, Cape Verde and Angola before arriving back at Simon's Town on 13 May. President Kruger towed the disabled tanker MV Simfonia clear of Danger Point on 24 June and acted as the guardship for the Lipton Cup regatta off Durban in July. Together with Maria van Riebeeck and Tafelberg, the ship participated in Sanex '71 with a pair of British frigates, the submarine HMS Oberon and the replenishment oiler RFA Tidesurge. Two years later, a small British task force that included the nuclear-powered attack submarine HMS Dreadnought was reinforced by President Kruger, President Steyn, the destroyer SAS Jan van Riebeeck, and Tafelberg for an unannounced exercise that simulated the defence of a convoy that was to be "attacked" by the submarine SAS Emily Hobhouse. The latter successfully penetrated the screen and "sank" three of the four replenishment ships standing in for merchant ships plus one escorting frigate and Dreadnought. In August 1974, the same task force was returning from the Far East and exercised with President Kruger and other ships of the SAN all the way from Simon's Town to the Canary Islands and then back again with the relieving task force. Beginning in November 1975, she patrolled off the Angolan coast during the South African Border War.

=== United States visit ===
Having just completed one such patrol in May 1976, the ship was notified that she would be participating in an International Naval Review in New York City as part of the United States Bicentennial celebrations, the first South African warship to visit the United States. President Kruger departed Simon's Town on 3 June, sailing via Walvis Bay, Abidjan and Las Palmas to Norfolk, Virginia. From there, she sailed in a fleet of 53 warships from 22 countries to New York City for the Naval Review on 4 July. On 6 July, members of the ship's company paraded through the streets of New York, after which she sailed home to Simonstown via Charleston, South Carolina and Las Palmas. The future politician, Lance Corporal Tony Leon, was the official photographer for this journey.

The aging President-class frigates were earmarked for disposal in 1978, with newer French-built D'Estienne d'Orves-class vessels scheduled to replace them. To provide manpower for the French corvettes under construction, President Kruger was placed in reserve in early 1977. However, the imposition of United Nations Security Council Resolution 418 put an end to both the sale of the replacement corvettes, as well as any major refurbishment of the President-class frigates, although President Kruger had her fire-control system upgraded and her electronics modernized during a refit in 1979–1980. She recommissioned on 15 August and later participated in the 20th anniversary of the republic's founding in May 1981 and exercised with a squadron from the Republic of China, together with President Pretorius. Shortly afterwards, the two sisters made a showing the flag cruise along the East African coast.

=== Accident and sinking ===
Location off the coast of South Africa

On the morning of 18 February 1982, President Kruger was conducting anti-submarine exercises for the Submarine Officer Commanding Course with President Pretorius, Emily Hobhouse and Tafelberg. The high-intensity exercises progressed from 06:00 to 23:00 over several days, with different candidate submarine captains being given an opportunity of executing a mock attack against Tafelberg. The rest of the day, the ships followed a narrow zig-zag course that allowed the submarine repeated opportunities to engage the surface ships in lower-intensity exercises while the bulk of the crew rested. The frigates too were using the opportunity to carry out anti-submarine exercises, with each ship given a patrol sector ahead of Tafelberg. The escorts were expected to patrol their areas in a random fashion 2,000–5,000 yards (1,800–4,600 m) from Tafelberg. President Kruger's station was on Tafelberg's port side between 10 and 330 degrees and President Pretorius had a station on the starboard side.

At approximately 04:00, the whole formation had to change direction by 154 degrees, a near complete reversal in direction, to stay within their training area. The frigates had to change direction first to maintain their protective positions ahead of Tafelberg on the new heading. President Kruger's options were to turn 200 degrees to port, or 154 degrees to starboard. While the latter turn was smaller and tactically sound, it was more dangerous as it involved turning towards the other two ships. Critically, the inexperienced officer of the watch (OOW) elected to turn to starboard, and initiated a turn with 10 degrees of rudder rather than the standard 15-degree turn. A 10-degree turn had a larger radius and would take longer to execute than a 15-degree turn, thereby allowing Tafelberg more time to close on the ship turning in front of her. Shortly after beginning the turn, an argument ensued between the OOW and the principal warfare officer (PWO) over the proper amount of wheel to apply. About two-thirds of the way through the turn, the operations room lost radar contact with Tafelberg in the clutter because the high-definition navigation radar was broken and the ship was using the less-precise search radar. The OOW was unable to recover the situation, and Tafelberg's bow impacted President Kruger on her port side at 03:55. The impact tore a large hole in her side and killed 13 of the 15 men sleeping near the point of collision. The ship took on a large list and the captain ordered "abandon ship" at 04:32. The exercise was immediately terminated and the other ships present began rescue operations. More ships, both military and civilian, began arriving after dawn, as did aircraft from the South African Air Force. A total of 177 crewmen of the 193 aboard were rescued. (Note: Bennett gives a total of 199 men aboard, but agrees with the 16 men lost. Some of the times given in Bennett differ from those in du Toit.)

==== Aftermath ====
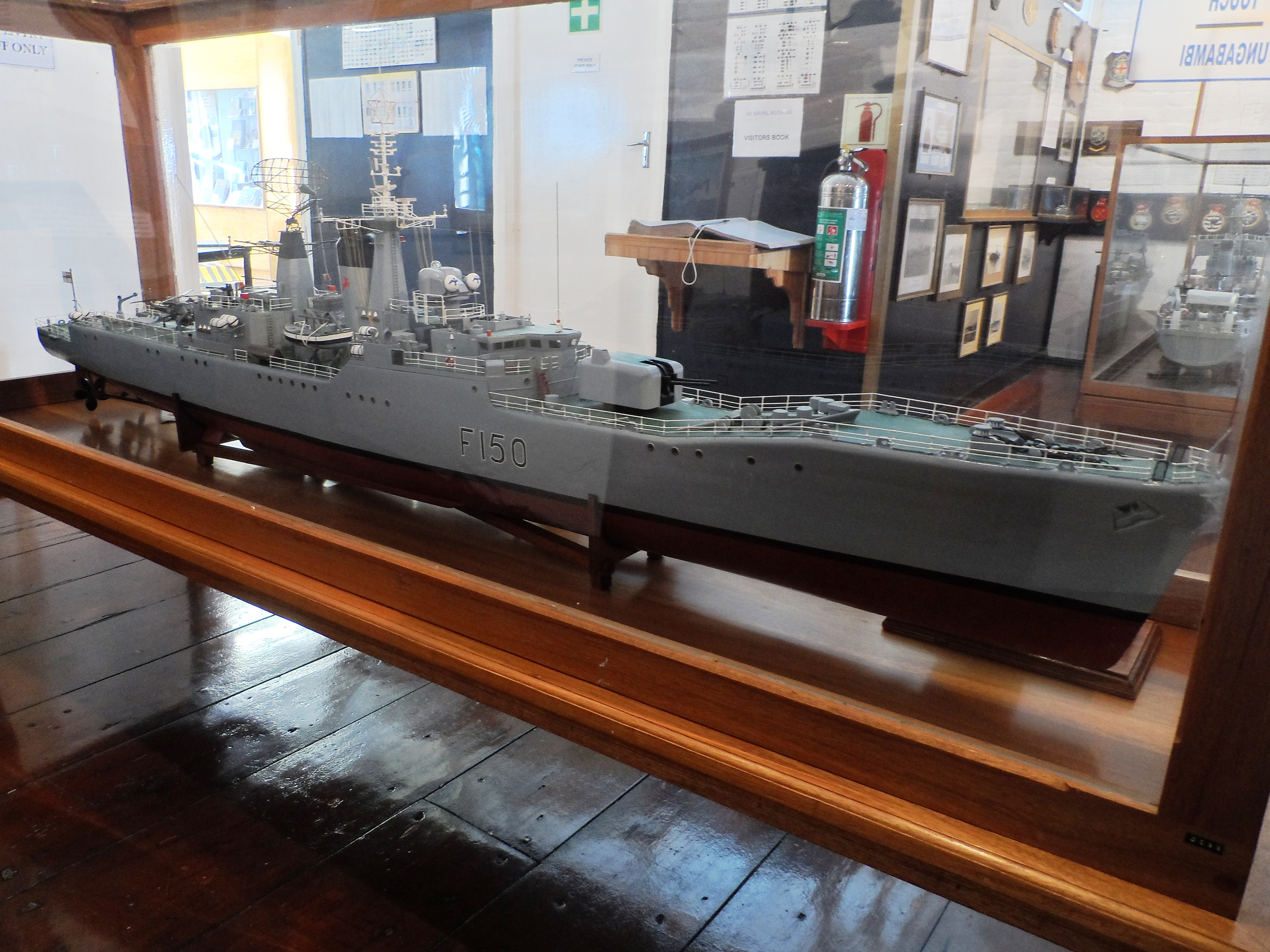
Model of SAS President Kruger at the South African Naval Museum in Simonstown

A naval board of inquiry was appointed shortly afterwards that determined the cause of the collision was of a lack of seamanship by the captain and watch officers of the ship. The Justice Minister, Kobie Coetsee, subsequently introduced a retrospective change in law to allow him to hold an inquest into the death of the only crewman whose body was found. The inquest lasted a year and apportioned blame on the captain and PWO.
