= SAS President Pretorius =

President-class Type 12 frigate built in the UK for the South African Navy

History

South Africa
- Name: President Pretorius
- Namesake: Marthinus Wessel Pretorius
- Ordered: 29 July 1959
- Builder: Yarrow Shipbuilders, Scotstoun, Glasgow
- Laid down: 21 November 1961
- Launched: 28 September 1962
- Commissioned: 18 March 1964
- Out of service: 26 July 1985
- Identification: Pennant number: F145
- Nickname(s): 'PP'
- Fate: Sold for scrap, 9 December 1992

General characteristics (as built)
- Class & type: President-class frigate
- Displacement: 2,170 long tons (2,200 t) (standard load); 2,605 long tons (2,647 t) (deep load)
- Length: 370 ft 0 in (112.78 m)
- Beam: 41 ft 0 in (12.5 m)
- Draught: 17 ft 6 in (5.33 m) (deep load)
- Installed power: 2 Babcock & Wilcox boilers; 30,000 shp (22,000 kW)
- Propulsion: 2 × shafts; 2 × geared steam turbines
- Speed: 30 knots (56 km/h; 35 mph)
- Range: 4,500 nmi (8,300 km; 5,200 mi) at 12 knots (22 km/h; 14 mph)
- Complement: 214
- Sensors & processing systems: Type 162, 170, 177M sonars; Type 293Q surface-search radar; Type 262 and 275 gunnery radars; Type 277Q height-finding radar; Type 978 navigation radar
- Armament: 2 × triple Limbo anti-submarine mortars; 1 × twin 4.5-inch (114 mm) dual-purpose gun; 1 × twin 40 mm (1.6 in) Bofors AA gun

SAS President Pretorius was the last of three President-class Type 12 frigates built in the UK for the South African Navy (SAN) during the 1960s. The ship spent most of her career training and visited foreign ports in Africa and Australia. She had a lengthy modernisation during the 1970s and manpower shortages limited her activities after that was completed in 1977. President Pretorius was paid off in 1985 and was sold for scrap in 1992.

== Description ==
The President-class ships displaced 2,170 long tons (2,200 t) at standard load and 2,605 long tons (2,647 t) at deep load. They had an overall length of 370 ft 0 in (112.78 m), a beam of 41 ft 0 in (12.5 m) and a mean deep draught of 17 ft 6 in (5.33 m). The ships were powered by a pair of English Electric geared steam turbines, each driving one propeller shaft, using steam provided by two Babcock & Wilcox boilers. The turbines developed a total of 30,000 shaft horsepower (22,000 kW) which gave a maximum speed of 30 knots (56 km/h; 35 mph). They carried 309 long tons (314 t) of fuel oil that gave them a range of 4,500 nautical miles (8,300 km; 5,200 mi) at 12 knots (22 km/h; 14 mph). Their crew numbered 14 officers and 200 ratings.

The Presidents were armed with one twin-gun mount for QF 4.5-inch (114 mm) Mk V dual-purpose guns forward and one twin mount for 40-millimetre (1.6 in) Bofors anti-aircraft guns. For anti-submarine work, the ships were fitted with Type 162, 170, and 177M sonars for the pair of triple-barrelled Mk 10 Limbo anti-submarine mortars. They were equipped with a Type 293Q surface-search radar, Type 262 and 275 gunnery radars, Type 277Q height-finding radar and a Type 978 navigation radar.

By the mid-1960s, it was obvious that the sonars of the President class were capable of detecting submarines well outside the range of the Limbo anti-submarine mortars and the South Africans decided to follow the lead of the Royal Navy (RN) in giving them the ability to operate helicopters that could carry anti-submarine torpedoes or depth charges to a considerable distance from the ships. Therefore, the forward Limbo mortar was removed and its space was plated over to form a small flight deck. The Bofors mount, its director and the aft superstructure was replaced by a hangar for a Westland Wasp helicopter. Two single Bofors guns were positioned on the hangar roof and provisions were made for four 0.5-inch (12.7 mm) Browning machine guns. A pair of American 12.75-inch (324 mm) Mk 32 triple-barrelled anti-submarine torpedo tubes were added amidships and their electronics were upgraded, including the addition of a Thomson-CSF Jupiter early-warning radar atop a new mainmast and a Selenia Orion fire-control system. In addition, President Pretorius was converted to use diesel fuel and some of her water ballast tanks were converted into fuel tanks.

== History ==
Three President-class frigates were ordered by the South African Navy in the late 1950s following the Simonstown Agreement with the RN. President Pretorius, named after the first President of the South African Republic, was the last of the three sister ships and was ordered from Yarrow Shipbuilders on 29 July 1959. The ship was laid down at their shipyard in Scotstoun, Glasgow on 21 November 1960 and was launched on 28 September 1962 by Mrs. Mientjie Grobelaar, wife of General Pieter Grobbelaar, Chief of the South African Defence Force. She was commissioned on 18 March 1964 with Captain James Johnson, later Chief of the Navy, in command.

President Pretorius was escorted into Cape Town by her two sisters, President Kruger, President Steyn, the destroyer Simon von der Stel and four smaller warships to be greeted by the Chief of Naval Staff, Rear Admiral Hugo Biermann, on 26 September. After 1964, the British government was reluctant to be seen openly cooperating with the apartheid government of South Africa and limited itself to exercises as their ships passed by. In September 1967, the 10th Frigate Flotilla, consisting of President Pretorius, President Kruger, and the newly commissioned replenishment oiler Tafelberg, participated in one such exercise with the aircraft carrier Eagle, the frigate Loch Fada and the submarine Ambush. The flotilla departed Simon's Town on 7 October 1968 for Australia and arrived in Fremantle on the 23rd. They continued onwards to Sydney and then participated in the Remembrance Day ceremony in Melbourne on 11 November. The ships departed three days later, bound for home, but they were forced to put into Fremantle when a pump in President Pretorius burnt out en route. They finally reached home on 3 December. A year later, a squadron consisting of Simon von der Stel, President Pretorius, Tafelberg and two minesweepers visited Portuguese Angola. President Kruger and President Pretorius trained with a passing British squadron in July–August 1970.

By this time, the navy was experiencing shortages of manpower and the ship was laid up on 1 September to be used as an accommodation ship while President Steyn was finishing up her modernisation. President Pretorius was formally decommissioned on 11 May 1971, but languished in reserve for some time before actual work began. The ship did not recommission until 12 July 1977 in marked contrast to the time required to modernise her sisters. She conveyed the remains of the Xhosa Chief Maqoma from Robben Island to Ciskei in August 1978. Almost three years later, in May 1981, President Pretorius and President Kruger participated in the 20th anniversary of the republic's founding and exercised with a squadron from the Republic of China (Taiwan). Shortly afterwards, the two sisters made a showing the flag cruise along the East African coast. After the accidental sinking of President Kruger in 1982 and the earlier laying up of President Steyn, President Pretorius was the last of the sisters remaining active. She was refitted during the early 1980s to lay mines and to operate assault boats. The ship exercised with another Taiwanese squadron in mid-1985 before she was decommissioned on 26 July due to manpower shortages and lack of funds. Plans to reactivate and modernise President Pretorius were made later in the 1980s, but shortages of money prevented them from being realized. The ship was sold for scrap on 9 December 1992 and subsequently broken up.
