= HMS Londonderry (F108) =

1960 Type 12M or Rothesay-class frigate of the Royal Navy

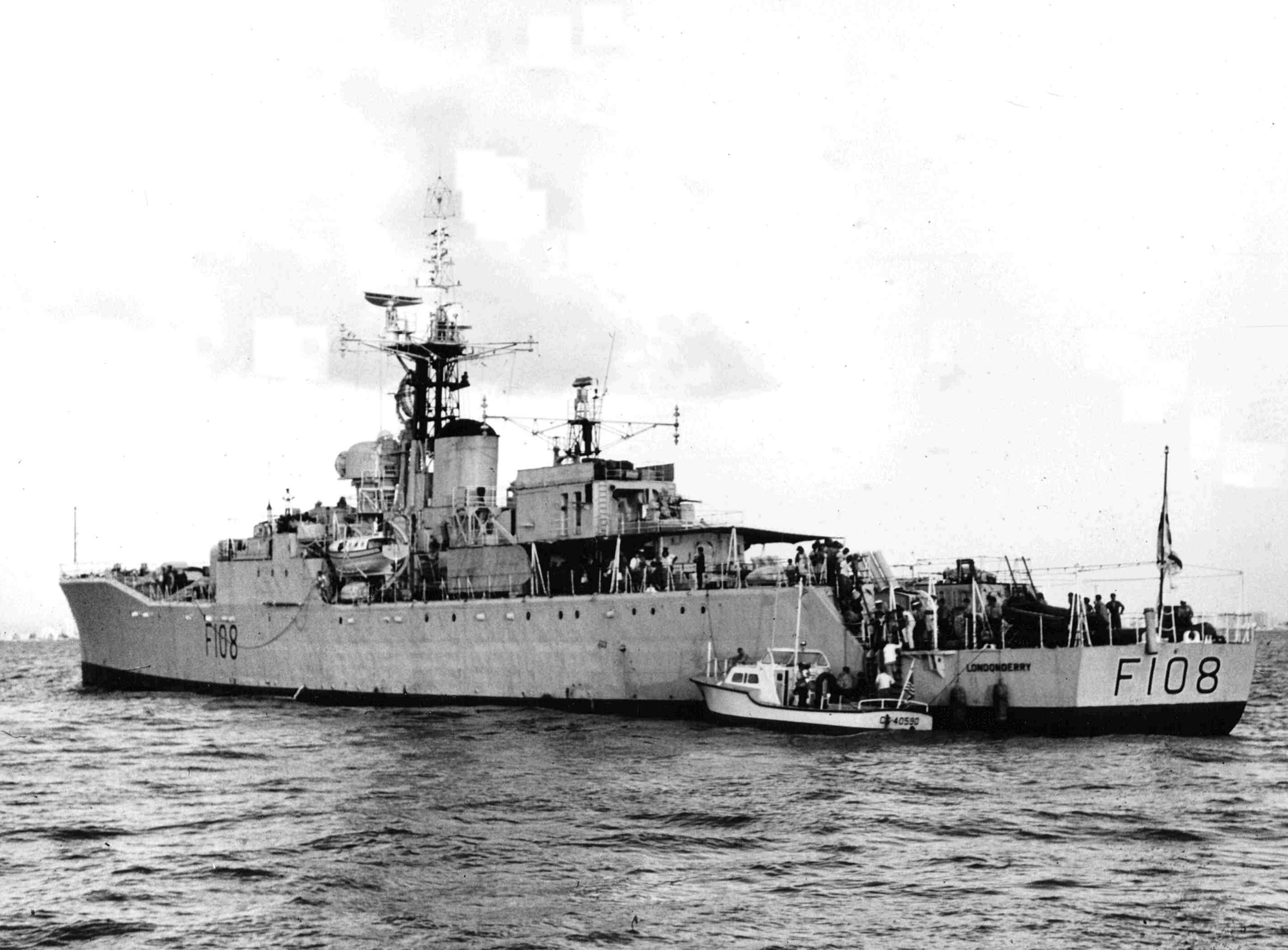
- HMS Londonderry off Miami, Florida, in 1964

History

United Kingdom
- Name: HMS Londonderry
- Builder: J. Samuel White, Cowes
- Laid down: 15 November 1956
- Launched: 20 May 1958
- Commissioned: 20 July 1960
- Decommissioned: 29 March 1984
- Identification: Pennant number: F108
- Motto: Non recedam
- Fate: Sunk as target, 25 June 1989

General characteristics
- Displacement: As built: 2,150 tons standard; 2,560 tons full load; As modified: 2,380 tons standard; 2,800 tons full load
- Length: 370 ft (110 m)
- Beam: 41 ft (12 m)
- Draught: 17.3 ft (5.3 m)
- Propulsion: Y-100 plant; Two Babcock & Wilcox boilers; Two English Electric steam turbines; 2 shafts; 30,000 shp
- Speed: 30 knots (56 km/h)
- Range: 400 tons oil fuel, 5,200 nautical miles (9,600 km) at 12 knots (22 km/h)
- Complement: 152, later 225, modified to 235
- Sensors & processing systems: (as built): Radar Type 293Q target indication. Later Type 993; Radar Type 277Q height finding; Radar Type 275 fire control on director Mark 6M. Removed as trials ship.; Radar Type 974 navigation. Later Type 978; Type 1010 Cossor Mark 10 IFF; Sonar Type 174 search; Sonar Type 162 target classification; Sonar Type 170 attack
- Armament: (as built): 1 × twin 4.5 in (11.4 cm) gun Mark 6; 1 × 40 mm Bofors gun Mark 7; 2 × Limbo A/S mortar Mark 10; 12 × 21-in A/S torpedo tubes (removed or never shipped); (as modified): 1 × twin 4.5 in (11.4 cm) gun Mark 6; 1 × Sea Cat GWS-20 SAM; 2 × 20 mm Oerlikon guns; 1 × Limbo A/S mortar Mark 10; 1 × Westland Wasp HAS.1 helicopter; 2 × 8-barrel 3 in Knebworth/Corvus countermeasures launchers?; As a trials ship all armament was removed.

HMS Londonderry was a Rothesay- or Type 12M (Modified) class anti-submarine frigate of the British Royal Navy in service from 1960 to 1984.

== Design ==
The Rothesay-class was an improved version of the Whitby-class anti-submarine frigate, with nine Rothesays ordered in the 1954–55 shipbuilding programme for the Royal Navy to supplement the six Whitbys.

Londonderry was 370 feet 0 inches (112.78 m) long overall and 360 feet 0 inches (109.73 m) between perpendiculars, with a beam of 41 feet 0 inches (12.50 m) and a draught of 13 feet 6 inches (4.11 m). The Rothesays were powered by the same Y-100 machinery used by the Whitby class. Two Babcock & Wilcox water-tube boilers fed steam at 550 pounds per square inch (3,800 kPa) and 850 °F (454 °C) to two sets of geared steam turbines which drove two propeller shafts, fitted with large (2 feet (0.61 m) diameter) slow-turning propellers. The machinery was rated at 30,000 shaft horsepower (22,000 kW), giving a speed of 29.5 knots (33.9 mph; 54.6 km/h). Crew was about 212 officers and men. (Note: Conway's states the crew of a Rothesay ranged from 200–235, while Jane's Fighting Ships 1962–63 states a crew of 200 (9 officers and 191 ratings))

A twin 4.5-inch (113 mm) Mark 6 gun mount was fitted forward, with 350 rounds of ammunition carried. It was originally intended to fit a twin 40 mm L/70 Bofors anti-aircraft mount aft, but in 1957 it was decided to fit the Seacat anti-aircraft missile instead. Seacat was not yet ready, and Londonderry was completed with a single Bofors 40 mm Automatic Gun L/60 mount aft as a temporary anti-aircraft armament. The design anti-submarine armament consisted of twelve 21-inch torpedo-tubes (eight fixed and two twin rotating mounts) for Mark 20E Bidder homing anti-submarine torpedoes, backed up by two Limbo anti-submarine mortars fitted aft. The Bidder homing torpedoes proved unsuccessful however, being too slow to catch modern submarines, and the torpedo tubes were soon removed.

The ship was fitted with a Type 293Q surface/air search radar on the foremast, with a Type 277 height-finding radar on a short mast forward of the foremast. A Mark 6M fire control system (including a Type 275 radar) for the 4.5 inch guns was mounted above the ship's bridge, while a Type 974 navigation radar was also fitted. The ship's sonar fit consisted of Type 174 search, Type 170 fire control sonar for Limbo and a Type 162 sonar for classifying targets on the sea floor.

== Construction ==
Londonderry was laid down at J. Samuel White's Cowes, Isle of Wight, shipyard on 15 November 1956, and was launched by Cynthia Brooke, Viscountess Brookeborough, wife of Basil Brooke, 1st Viscount Brookeborough, the Prime Minister of Northern Ireland, on 20 May 1958. She was completed on 20 July 1960. (Note: While Friedman, Marriott and Conways have Londonderry completing on 18 October 1961, Jane's Fighting Ships say she was completed on 22 July 1960, while a contemporary report in Navy News says she was commissioned on 20 July 1960.)

=== Modernisation ===
From 1967 to 1969 Londonderry underwent a major modernisation, which brought the ship close in capacity to the Leander class. A hangar and flight deck was added aft to allow a Westland Wasp helicopter to be operated, at the expense of one of the Limbo anti-submarine mortars, while a Seacat launcher and the associated GWS20 director was mounted on the hangar roof. Two 20-mm cannons were added either side of the ship's bridge. A MRS3 fire control system replaced the Mark 6M, and its integral Type 903 radar allowed the Type 277 height finder radar to be removed. A Type 993 surface/air-search radar replaced the existing Type 293Q radar, while the ship's defences were enhanced by the addition of the Corvus chaff rocket dispenser.

== Fleet service ==
After commissioning on 20 July 1960, Londonderry completed manufacturer's trials and then was formally taken over by the Royal Navy. She then operated in the Home Fleet before departing Portsmouth, Hampshire, UK, on 1 May 1961 for her first cruise in the Caribbean area. After mid-1963 she came under the command of Commodore Edward Ashmore here. Between 1961 and 1964 the frigate was deployed four times to the West Indies, also visiting Argentina. In October 1961 she was diverted to assist the Italian liner MV Bianca C when the latter caught fire in the port of St. George's, Grenada. In August 1965 she was present at Portsmouth Navy Days. On 1 April 1963, Londonderry ferried 17 suspected members of an anti-Castro group who had been arrested by Bahamas Police on a Cay in the Cay Sal Bankss to Nassau, Bahamas. On 31 August 1965 Londonderry left Portsmouth for service in the Far East. She returned in 1967 and was modernised until 1969 at Rosyth. The most distinctive features of her modernization were the helicopter deck and hangar aft for a Westland Wasp helicopter.

Following her modernization she was sent to Malaysia in 1970. She also took part in the Beira Patrol and was then sent to the Bahamas where she rescued 148 Cuban refugees. In 1973 she replaced Yarmouth in the NATO Standing Naval Force Atlantic.

== Trials ship ==
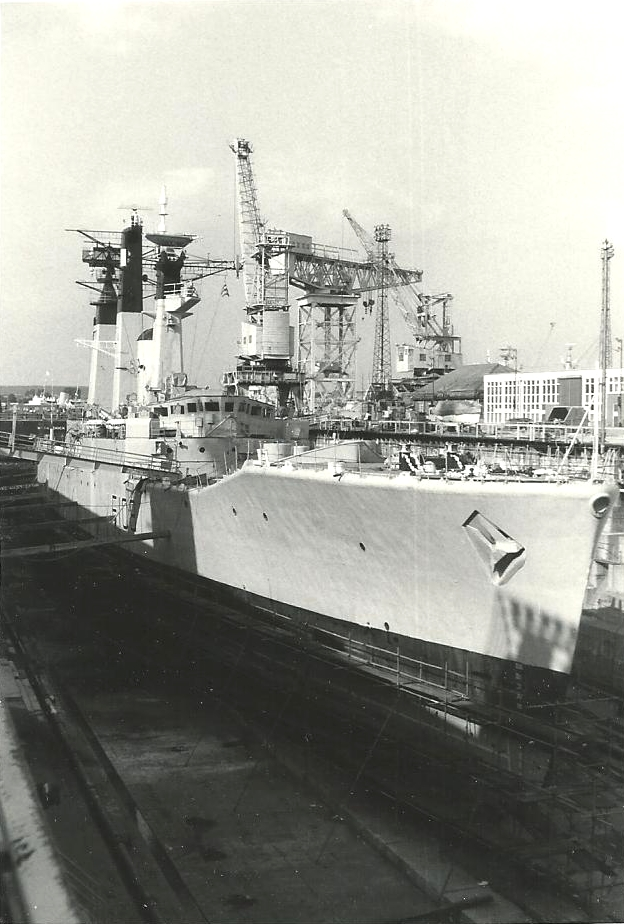
Rothesay-class Type 12M anti-submarine frigate HMS Londonderry under major conversion to a weapons-trials ship with the 4.5-inch gun turret removed, a helicopter pad fitted, and no less than three radar-electronic masts erected (instead of the one as built). At Portsmouth Navy Days, August 1980.

In November 1975 she entered the Rosyth Dockyard to be refitted as a trials ship for Admiralty Surface Weapons Establishment. Up to October 1979 Londonderry had her armament removed, and an extra mast added for her new role as a trials ship. The original propellers were replaced and new, low-cavitation propellers were installed. Additional navigational equipment and accommodation were installed to provide berths for both midshipmen from Dartmouth and apprentices from HMS Caledonia who were undergoing sea training.

In early 1982, Londonderry accompanied Fearless on a sea training trip to the West Indies and the United States, visiting Virgin Gorda in the British Virgin Islands and New Orleans during the Mardi Gras celebrations. Returning home she was paid off into reserve on 31 March 1982. Originally she should have been put on the disposal list, but due to the Falklands War she became the Dartmouth Training Ship of the 6th Frigate Squadron. From 20 January to 29 March Londonderry made her last cruise from Portsmouth for the Dartmouth Training Squadron's deployment to the West Indies and USA. She then became a Harbour Training Ship attached to the shore base HMS Sultan at Gosport. She remained in this role until 1988. On 25 June 1989 Londonderry was finally sunk as a target off Scotland.

During her service Londonderry steamed approximately 125,500 km, four times crossing the Atlantic and transiting the Panama Canal three times. She visited 50 ports in 35 different countries. Although never deployed in a war the ship's guns fired 1,232 rounds of 4.5-inch ammunition and 442 rounds of 40 mm ammunition.

== Publications ==
- Blackman, Raymond V. B. (1962). Jane's Fighting Ships 1962–63. London: Sampson Low, Marston & Co., Ltd.
- Blackman, Raymond V. B. (1971). Jane's Fighting Ships 1971–72. London: Sampson Low, Marston & Co., Ltd. ISBN 0-354-00096-9.
- Colledge, J. J.; Warlow, Ben (2006) [1969]. Ships of the Royal Navy: The Complete Record of All Fighting Ships of the Royal Navy from the 15th Century to the Present (3rd Rev ed.). London: Chatham Publishing. ISBN 978-1-86176-281-8. OCLC 67375475.
- Critchley, Mike (1992). British Warships Since 1945: Part 5: Frigates. Liskeard, UK: Maritime Press. ISBN 0-907771-13-0.
- Friedman, Norman (2008). British Destroyers & Frigates: The Second World War and After. Barnsley, UK: Seaforth Publishing. ISBN 978-1-84832-015-4.
- Gardiner, Robert; Chumbley, Stephen, eds. (1995). Conway's All The World's Fighting Ships 1947–1995. Annapolis, Maryland, USA: Naval Institute Press. ISBN 1-55750-132-7.
- Marriott, Leo (1983). Royal Navy Frigates 1945–1983. Shepperton, Surrey, UK: Ian Allan Ltd. ISBN 0-7110-1322-5.
- Moore, John, ed. (1979). Jane's Fighting Ships 1979–80. London: Jane's Yearbooks. ISBN 0-354-00587-1.
