= HMS Rothesay (F107) =

Rothesay-class frigate of the Royal Navy

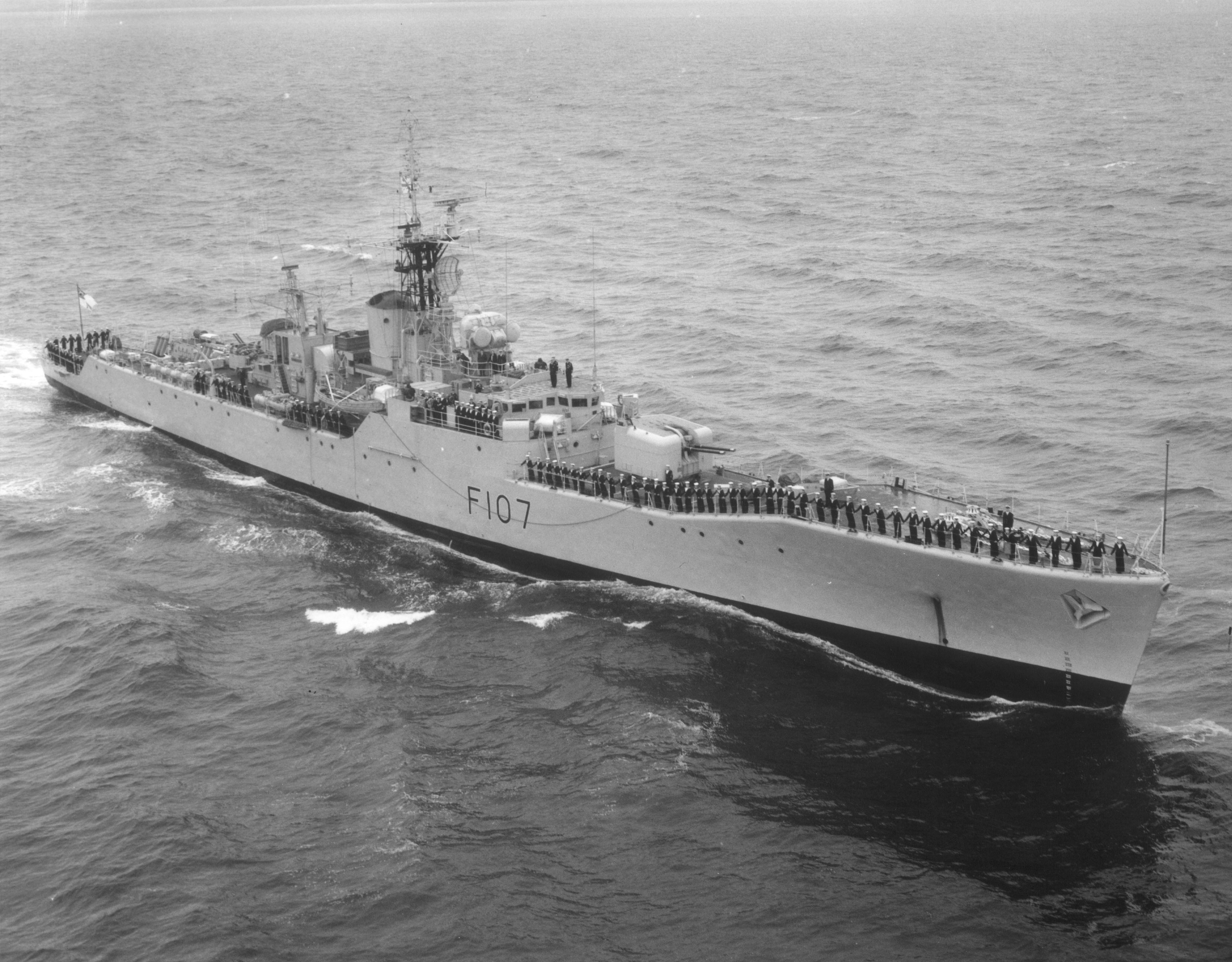
- Saluting HMY Britannia, the royal yacht in the 1960s, before Rothesay's 1966 Seacat/helicopter upgrade – note the 40 mm gun in stern

History

United Kingdom
- Name: Rothesay
- Builder: Yarrow, Scotstoun
- Laid down: 6 November 1956
- Launched: 9 December 1957
- Commissioned: 23 April 1960
- Decommissioned: March 1988
- Identification: Pennant number: F107
- Fate: Scrapped in 1988

General characteristics
- Class & type: Rothesay-class frigate
- Displacement: As built: 2,150 tons standard; 2,560 tons full load; As modified: 2,380 tons standard; 2,800 tons full load
- Length: 370 ft (110 m)
- Beam: 41 ft (12 m)
- Draught: 17.3 ft (5.3 m)
- Propulsion: Y-100 plant; Two Babcock & Wilcox boilers; Two English Electric steam turbines; 2 shafts; 30,000 shp
- Speed: 30 knots (56 km/h)
- Range: 400 tons oil fuel, 5,200 nautical miles (9,600 km) at 12 knots (22 km/h)
- Complement: 152, later 225, modified to 235
- Sensors & processing systems: Electronics (as built): Radar Type 293Q target indication; Radar Type 277Q height finding; Radar Type 275 fire control on director Mark 6M; Radar Type 974 navigation; Type 1010 Cossor Mark 10 IFF; Sonar Type 174 search; Sonar Type 162 target classification; Sonar Type 170 attack; Electronics (as modified): Radar Type 993 target indication; Radar Type 903 fire control on director MRS3; Radar Type 978 navigation; Type 1010 Cossor Mark 10 IFF; Sonar Type 177 search; Sonar Type 162 target classification; Sonar Type 170 attack
- Armament: Armament (as built): 1 × twin 4.5in gun Mark 6; 1 × twin 40 mm Bofors gun on STAAG mounting; 2 × Limbo A/S mortar Mark 10; 12 × 21-in A/S torpedo tubes, 8 fixed and 2 x twin trainable mounts; Armament (as modified): 1 × twin 4.5in gun Mark 6; 1 × Sea Cat GWS-20 SAM; 2 × 20 mm Oerlikon guns; 1 × Limbo A/S mortar Mark 10; 1 × Westland Wasp HAS.1 Helicopter; 2 × 8-barrel 3in Knebworth/Corvus chaff countermeasures launchers

HMS Rothesay was the lead ship of the Rothesay or Type 12M class of anti-submarine frigates of the British Royal Navy. She was commissioned in 1960 and scrapped in 1988.

== Design ==
The Rothesay-class was an improved version of the Whitby-class anti-submarine frigate, with nine Rothesays ordered in the 1954–55 shipbuilding programme for the Royal Navy to supplement the six Whitbys.

Rothesay was 370 feet 0 inches (112.78 m) long overall and 360 feet 0 inches (109.73 m) between perpendiculars, with a beam of 41 feet 0 inches (12.50 m) and a draught of 13 feet 6 inches (4.11 m). The Rothesays were powered by the same Y-100 machinery used by the Whitby class. Two Babcock & Wilcox water-tube boilers fed steam at 550 pounds per square inch (3,800 kPa) and 850 °F (454 °C) to two sets of geared steam turbines which drove two propeller shafts, fitted with large (12 feet (3.7 m) diameter) slow-turning propellers. The machinery was rated at 30,000 shaft horsepower (22,000 kW), giving a speed of 29.5 knots (33.9 mph; 54.6 km/h). Crew was about 212 officers and men. (Note: Conway's states the crew of a Rothesay ranged from 200–235, while Jane's Fighting Ships 1962–63 states a crew of 200 (9 officers and 191 ratings))

A twin 4.5-inch (113 mm) Mark 6 gun mount was fitted forward, with 350 rounds of ammunition carried. It was originally intended to fit a twin 40 mm L/70 Bofors anti-aircraft mount aft, but in 1957, while Rothesay was still under construction, it was decided to fit the Seacat anti-aircraft missile instead. Seacat was not yet ready, and Rothesay was completed with a twin Mark 5 L/60 40 mm Bofors mount aft as a temporary anti-aircraft armament. The design anti-submarine armament consisted of twelve 21-inch torpedo-tubes (eight fixed and two twin rotating mounts) for Mark 20E Bidder homing anti-submarine torpedoes, backed up by two Limbo anti-submarine mortars fitted aft. The Bidder homing torpedoes proved unsuccessful, however, being too slow to catch modern submarines, and the torpedo tubes were soon removed.

The ship was fitted with a Type 293Q surface/air search radar on the foremast, with a Type 277 height-finding radar on a short mast forward of the foremast. A Mark 6M fire control system (including a Type 275 radar) for the 4.5-inch guns was mounted above the ship's bridge, while a Type 974 navigation radar was also fitted. The ship's sonar fit consisted of Type 174 search, Type 170 fire control sonar for Limbo and a Type 162 sonar for classifying targets on the sea floor.

Rothesay was laid down at Yarrow's Scotstoun dockyard on 6 November 1956, was launched on 9 December 1957 by Audrey Douglas-Hamilton, wife of George Douglas-Hamilton, the First Lord of the Admiralty, and completed on 23 April 1960. She was the second ship of that name to serve with the Royal Navy.

=== Modernisation ===
From 1966 to 1968 Rothesay underwent a major modernisation, which brought the ship close in capacity to the Leander class. A hangar and flight deck was added aft to allow a Westland Wasp helicopter to be operated, at the expense of one of the Limbo anti-submarine mortars, while a Seacat launcher and the associated GWS20 director were mounted on the hangar roof. Two 20-mm cannons were added either side of the ship's bridge. A MRS3 fire control system replaced the Mark 6M, and its integral Type 903 radar allowed the Type 277 height finder radar to be removed. A Type 993 surface/air-search radar replaced the existing Type 293Q radar, while the ship's defences were enhanced by the addition of the Corvus chaff rocket dispenser.

== History ==
In the spring/summer of 1961 Rothesay was in Halifax, Nova Scotia and was intending to make courtesy calls at ports on the eastern seaboard of the United States but was instead diverted to Bermuda, location of the Royal Naval Dockyard that had been reduced to a naval station in 1951 (and headquarters of the America and West Indies Station until 1956, when the position of the Commander-in-Chief was abolished, though the station frigates remained based there), where she was to stay ready to protect British interests in Cuba. On 21 March 1962 she accidentally rammed the Turkish Balao-class submarine TCG Gür in the western Mediterranean (off Gibraltar) during the NATO exercise "Dawn Breeze". Between 1962 and 1963 she was commanded by Captain B C Godfrey Place.

During two visits to the West Indies (7 months and 11 months) she was at Nassau, Bahamas and filmed for three days to get a 30-second showing in the James Bond film Thunderball. A sheet of canvas with a "0" was placed over the "F1" of her pennant number (F107) to read 007. Sean Connery and Claudine Auger came on board. On 14/15 January 1966 Rothesay rescued 134 Haitian refugees, who had been attempting to reach the Bahamas in a 35-foot (11 m) long fishing boat but had run aground on an uninhabited island.

Between 1966 and 1968 Rothesay was refitted in Rosyth. Among the improvements the 40 mm gun was replaced with Seacat missile system, radar and communication equipment was updated, accommodation improved and perhaps most significantly a helicopter flight deck and hangar were added. Although this required the removal of one of the two triple barrelled anti-submarine mortars, it allowed the Rothesay class to carry the Westland Wasp helicopter, which was a huge asset for anti-submarine operations. This modernisation was a vast improvement over the Whitby class and brought the Rothesay class up to the standard of the succeeding Leander-class frigate.

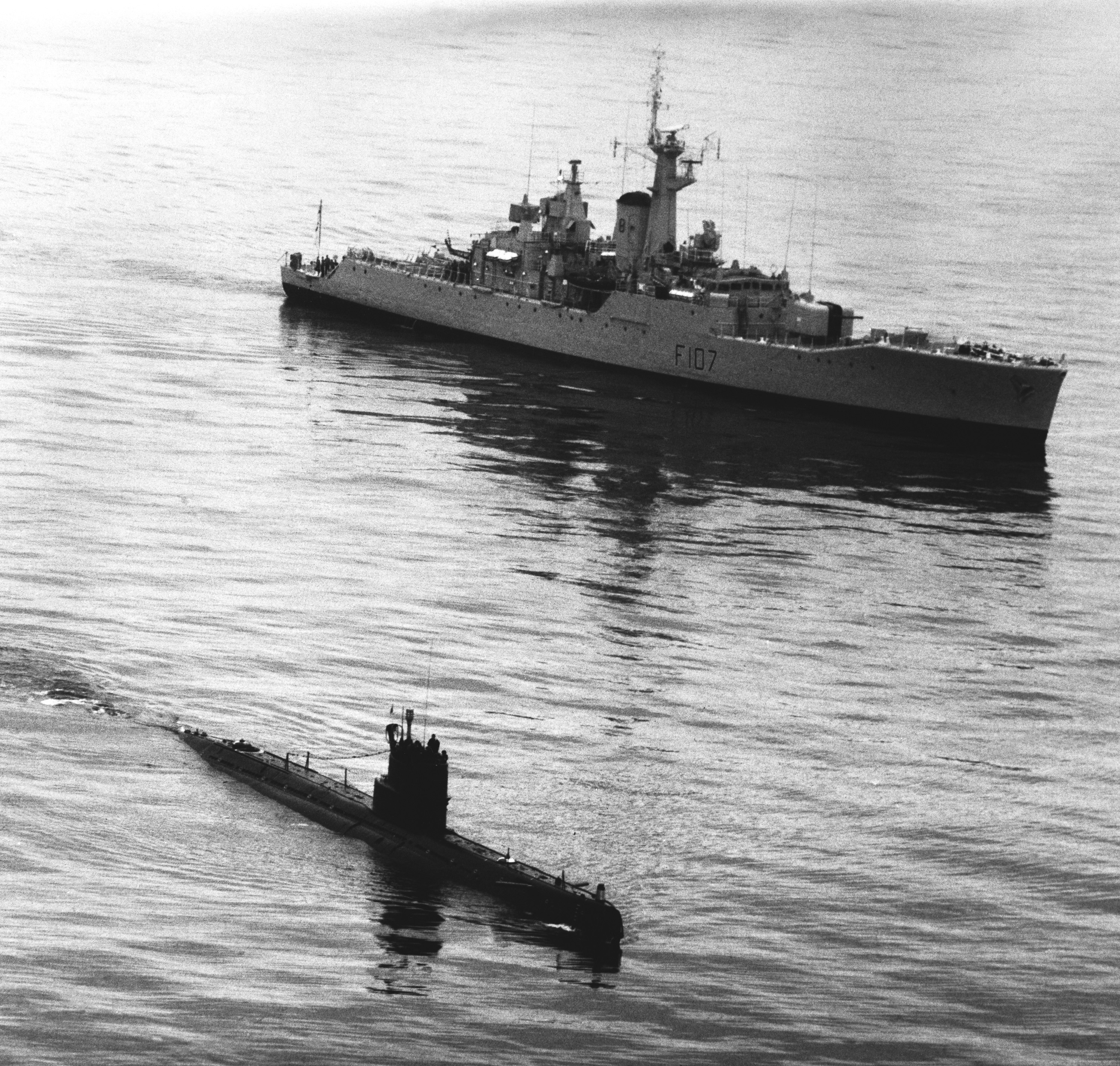
With a Whiskey-class submarine in 1987

On 19 March 1969, together with Minerva, they landed 315 men of The Parachute Regiment on Anguilla to restore order after the islanders objected to being placed under the government of Saint Kitts. In 1971, she was present at Portsmouth Navy Days.

In April 1970 Rothesay was one of several Royal Navy vessels that were stationed for a possible tertiary splashdown recovery of Apollo 13 in a position just south of Rio de Janeiro, Brazil.

In 1973 Rothesay undertook Cod War fishery protection patrols.

She attended the 1977 Silver Jubilee Fleet Review with sister ships Plymouth, Berwick and Brighton. At this time, she was part of the 8th Frigate Squadron.

At the start of the Falklands War, Rothesay was in Rosyth under repair after she hit a sea wall in Esbjerg, Denmark. During the 1982 conflict, Rothesay was stationed in the Caribbean.

There were plans to withdraw the ship from service in 1983, but these were abandoned and instead in 1985 she underwent a refit in preparation for her new role in the Dartmouth Training Squadron. She served in this role until she was paid off on 13 March 1988. During her many years of service, she clocked up over 800,000 miles. She was sold to Spain and was broken up at Santander in 1988.

== Bibliography ==
- Blackman, Raymond V. B. (1962). Jane's Fighting Ships 1962–63. London: Sampson Low, Marston & Co., Ltd.
- Colledge, J. J.; Warlow, Ben (2006) [1969]. Ships of the Royal Navy: The Complete Record of All Fighting Ships of the Royal Navy from the 15th Century to the Present (3rd Rev ed.). London: Chatham Publishing. ISBN 978-1-86176-281-8. OCLC 67375475.
- Critchley, Mike (1992). British Warships Since 1945: Part 5: Frigates. Liskeard, UK: Maritime Press. ISBN 0-907771-13-0.
- Friedman, Norman (2008). British Destroyers & Frigates: The Second World War and After. Barnsley, UK: Seaforth Publishing. ISBN 978-1-84832-015-4.
- Gardiner, Robert; Chumbley, Stephen, eds. (1995). Conway's All The World's Fighting Ships 1947–1995. Annapolis, Maryland, US: Naval Institute Press. ISBN 1-55750-132-7.
- Marriott, Leo (1983). Royal Navy Frigates 1945–1983. Shepperton, Surrey, UK: Ian Allan Ltd. ISBN 0-7110-1322-5.
