= HMS Rhyl (F129) =

1960 Type 12M or Rothesay-class frigate of the Royal Navy

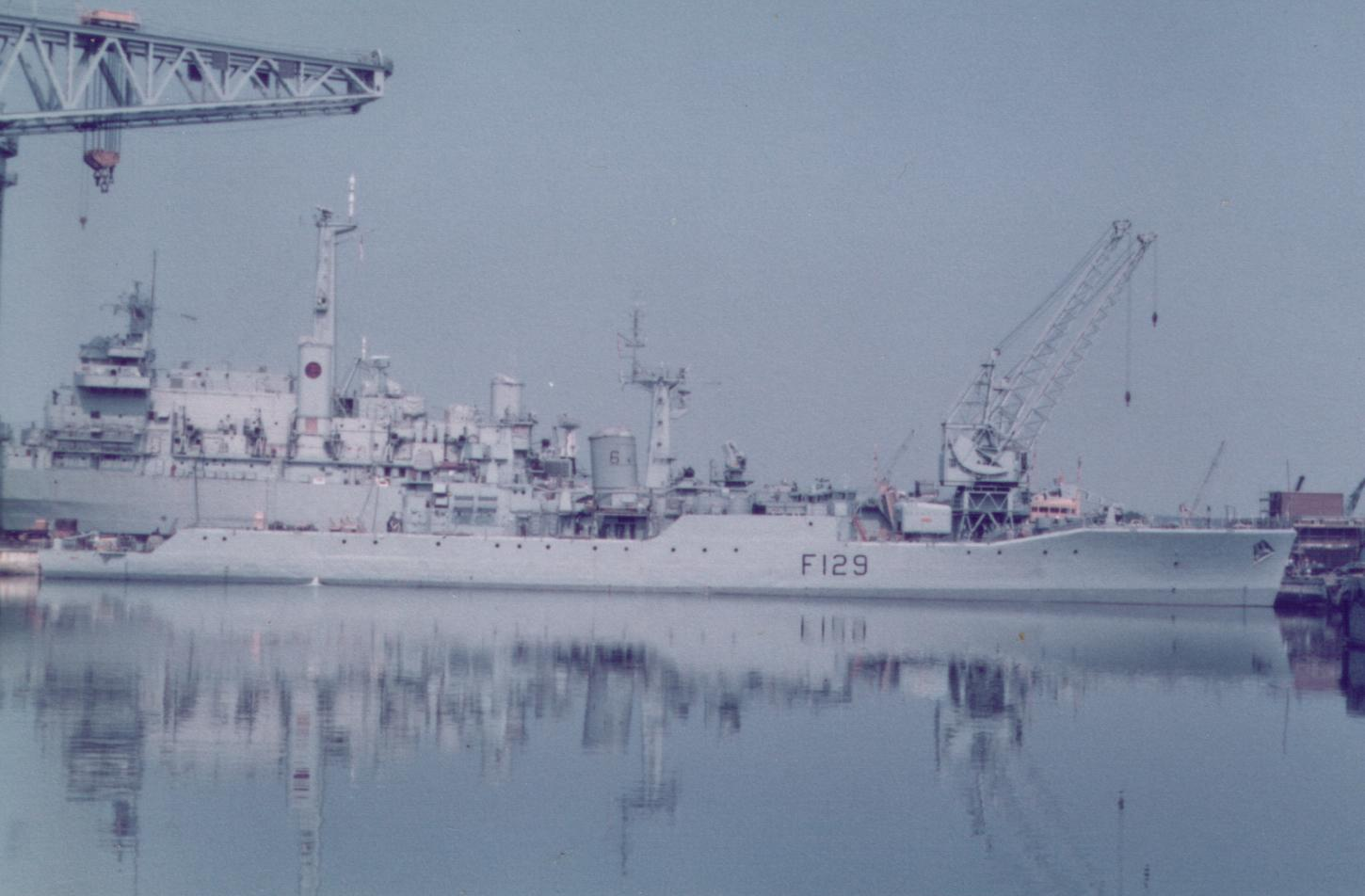
- HMS Rhyl

History

United Kingdom
- Name: HMS Rhyl
- Builder: HM Dockyard, Portsmouth English Electric Co Ltd, Rugby.
- Laid down: 29 January 1958
- Launched: 23 April 1959
- Commissioned: 31 October 1960
- Decommissioned: 1983
- In service: 1960–1983
- Identification: Pennant number: F129
- Fate: Scuttled during bad weather whilst being prepared to be sunk as a target, 27 July 1985
- Badge: Blue, three anchors conjoined in the centre gold

General characteristics
- Class & type: Rothesay-class frigate

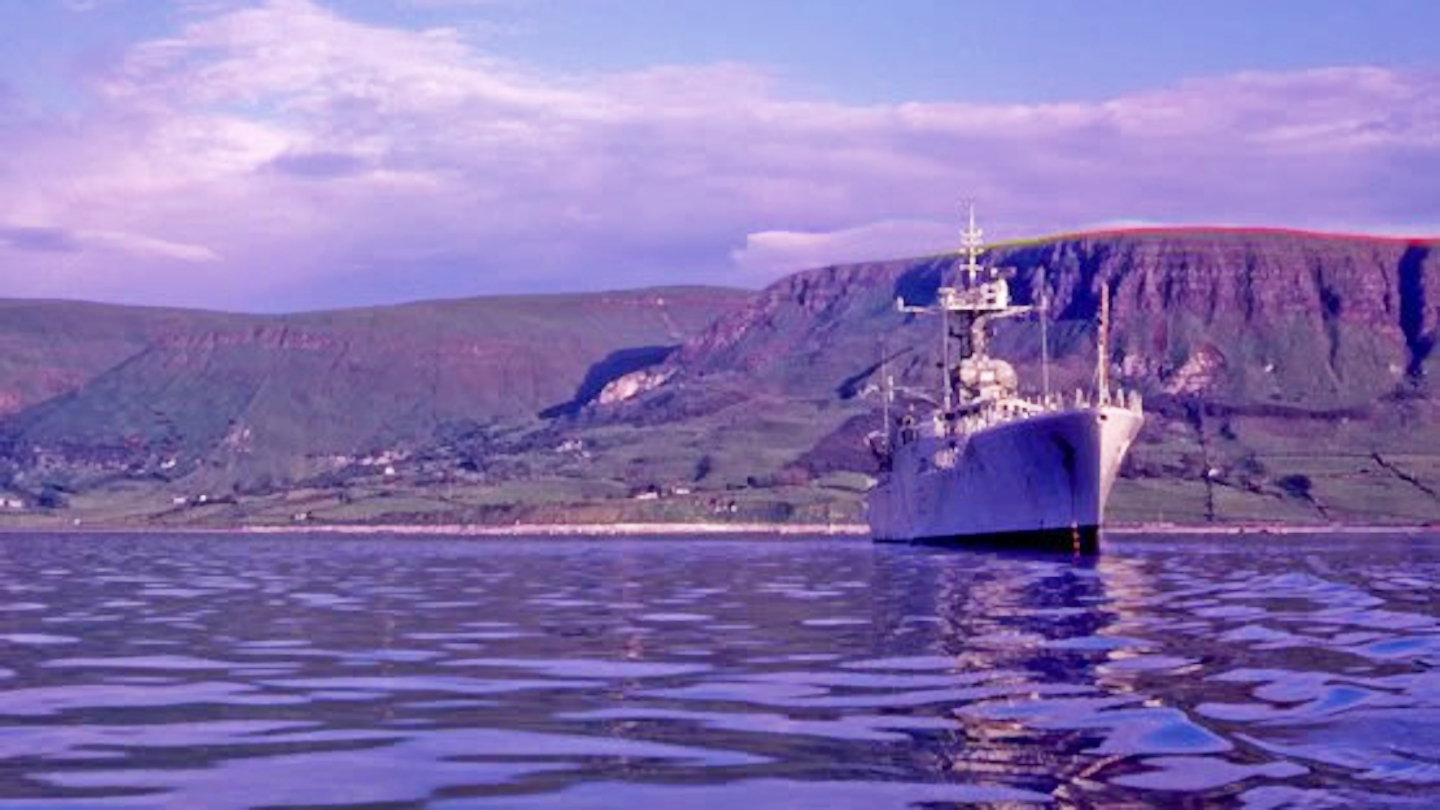
HMS Rhyl in the Irish Sea, 1966

HMS Rhyl was a Rothesay-class or Type 12M anti-submarine frigate of the Royal Navy, launched by Lady Macmillan on 23 February 1959 and commissioned in October 1960. Following Royal Navy service she was scuttled whilst being prepared as a target in 1985.

== Design ==
The Rothesay class was an improved version of the Whitby-class anti-submarine frigate, with nine Rothesays ordered in the 1954–1955 shipbuilding programme for the Royal Navy to supplement the six Whitbys.

Rhyl was 370 feet 0 inches (112.8 m) long overall and 360 feet 0 inches (109.7 m) between perpendiculars, with a beam of 41 feet 0 inches (12.5 m) and a draught of 13 feet 6 inches (4.1 m). The Rothesays were powered by the same Y-100 machinery used by the Whitby class. Two Babcock & Wilcox water-tube boilers fed steam at 550 pounds per square inch (3,800 kPa) and 850 °F (454 °C) to two sets of geared steam turbines which drove two propeller shafts, fitted with large (2 feet (1 m) diameter) slow-turning propellers. The machinery was rated at 30,000 shaft horsepower (22,371 kW), giving a speed of 29.5 knots (33.9 mph; 54.6 km/h). Crew was about 212 officers and ratings. (Note: Conway's states the crew of a Rothesay ranged from 200–235, while Jane's Fighting Ships 1962–63 states a crew of 200 (9 officers and 191 ratings))

A twin 4.5-inch (113 mm) Mark 6 gun mount was fitted forward, with 350 rounds of ammunition carried. It was originally intended to fit a twin 40 mm L/70 Bofors anti-aircraft mount aft, but in 1957 it was decided to fit the Seacat anti-aircraft missile instead. Seacat was not yet ready, and Rhyl was completed with a single L/60 Bofors 40 mm mount aft as a temporary anti-aircraft armament. The design anti-submarine armament consisted of twelve 21-inch torpedo-tubes (eight fixed and two twin rotating mounts) for Mark 20E Bidder homing anti-submarine torpedoes, backed up by two Limbo anti-submarine mortars fitted aft. The Bidder homing torpedoes proved unsuccessful, being too slow to catch modern submarines and the torpedo tubes were removed.

The ship was fitted with a Type 293Q surface/air search radar on the foremast, with a Type 277 height-finding radar on a short mast forward of the foremast. A Mark 6M fire control system (including a Type 275 radar) for the 4.5 inch guns was mounted above the ship's bridge, while a Type 974 navigation radar was also fitted. The ship's sonar fit consisted of Type 174 search, Type 170 fire control sonar for Limbo and a Type 162 sonar for classifying targets on the sea floor.

== Construction ==
Rhyl was laid down at Portsmouth Dockyard on 29 January 1958. She was launched by Lady Dorothy Macmillan, wife of the-then Prime Minister, Harold Macmillan on 23 April 1959, and completed on 31 October 1960.

== Operational service ==
Following commissioning in 1960 Rhyl served in the Far East, Mediterranean and East Africa, including being diverted to stand-by off Goa following the Indian invasion in 1961. She was the 23rd Frigate Squadron leader by the time she attended Portsmouth Navy Days in 1965. Between 1964 and 1966 she was commanded by J A Templeton-Cotill who subsequently attained flag rank. On 12 January 1964, the Zanzibar Revolution overthrew the rule of Jamshid bin Abdullah, the Sultan of Zanzibar. As a response, Rhyl embarked a company of soldiers from 1st Battalion, the Staffordshire Regiment, and, together with the survey ship Owen and the stores ship Hebe, evacuated British civilians from Zanzibar. Later that month, the Tanganyikan Army mutinied, and the British intervened on the side of the Tanganyikan government, with Rhyl supporting landings of Royal Marines from the aircraft carrier Centaur. She served, along with HMS Ark Royal and HMS Lowestoft, on the first Beira Patrol, and then in 1966–7 served in the Mediterranean as Captain D 23rd Escort Squadron with squadron elements HMS Lowestoft (half leader), HMS Dainty and HMS Defender.

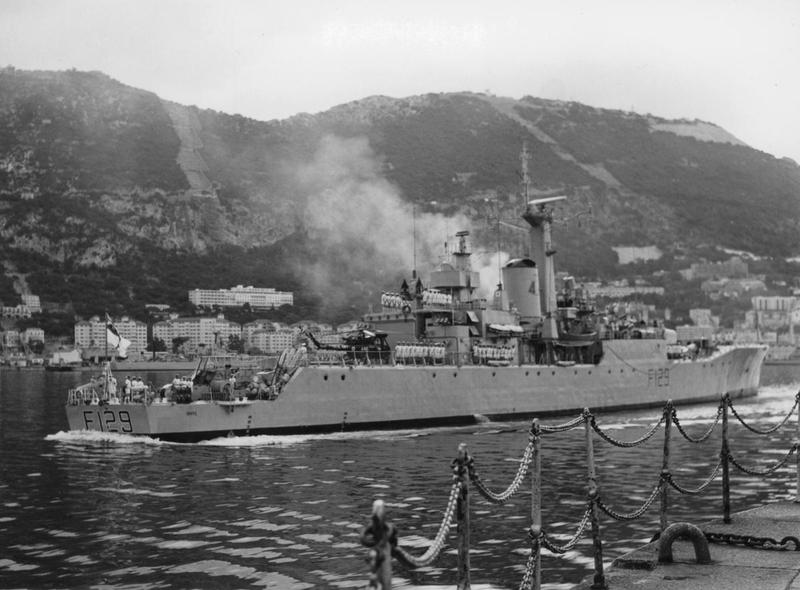
HMS Rhyl, following a major refit, showing Seacat missile system and hangar for Wasp helicopter, c1970 (IWM)

HMS Rhyl returned to UK waters in 1967, eventually decommissioning in Plymouth to undergo a major refit and upgrade to a Leander-like specification.

In April 1982, Rhyl was ordered south for Operation Corporate, but mechanical failure prevented the deployment, so she acted as Ascension Island guardship until July 1982. HMS Rhyl deployed to the United States and West Indies in the first few months of 1983, returning to Portsmouth in April 1983 where she was expected to take her place in the Orient Express deployment led by HMS Invincible later that year. However whilst in dry dock, it was discovered that her hull was compromised and the decision was made to pay her off.

In the summer of 1985, HMS Rhyl was designated to be sunk as a target during torpedo trials. However, she was intentionally scuttled on account of severe weather on 27 July 1985.The wreck lies at a depth of more than 600m at coordinates = 49.3069°N 11.3030°W.
