= HMS Berwick (F115) =

Type 12M or Rothesay-class frigate of the Royal Navy

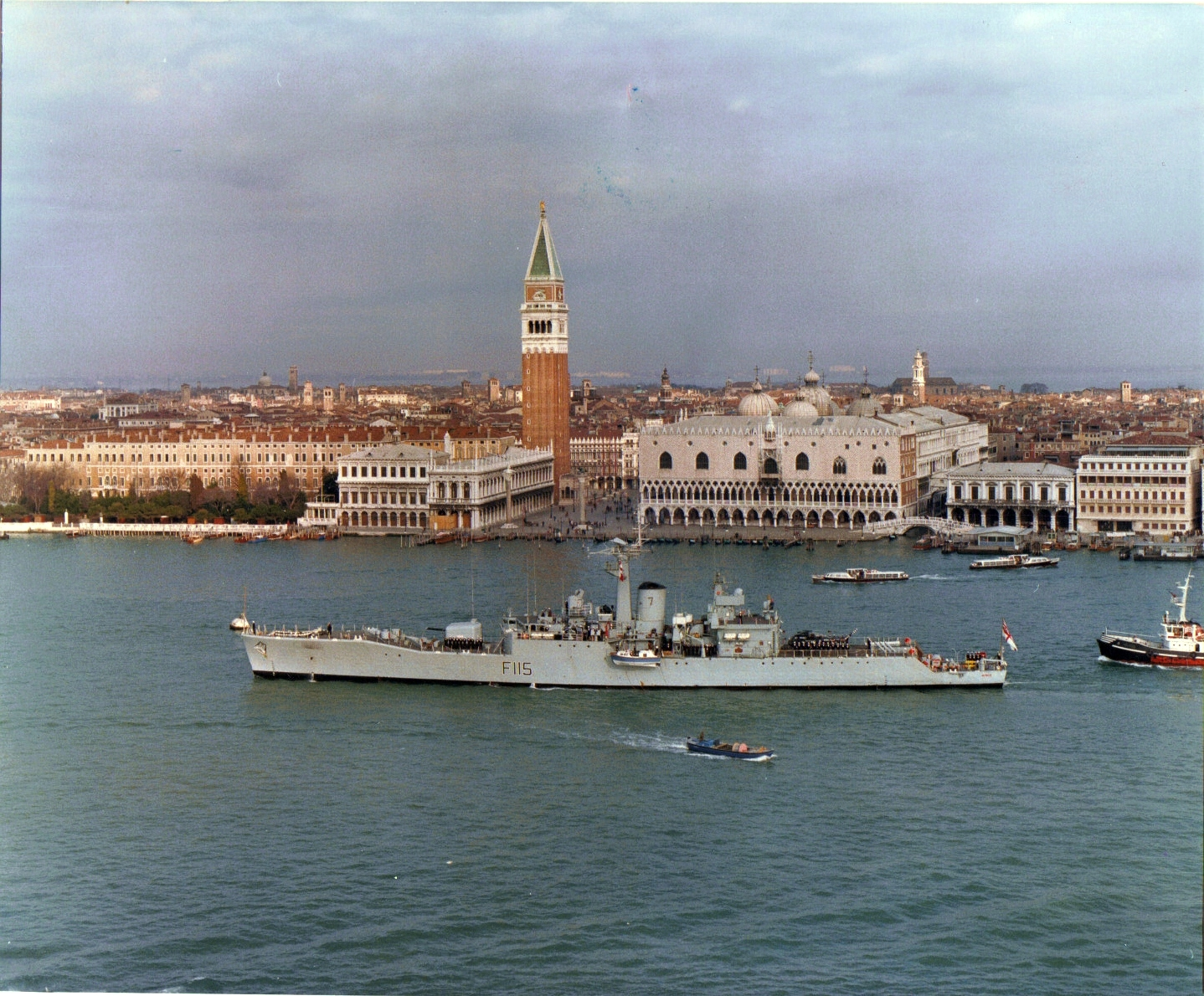
- HMS Berwick

History

United Kingdom
- Name: HMS Berwick (F115)
- Operator: Royal Navy
- Builder: Harland and Wolff
- Laid down: 16 June 1958
- Launched: 15 December 1959
- Completed: 1 June 1961
- Home port: Plymouth
- Identification: Pennant number: F115
- Fate: Sunk as target, August 1986

General characteristics
- Class & type: Rothesay-class frigate
- Displacement: 2,490 tonnes
- Length: 112.8 m (370 ft)
- Beam: 12.5 m (41 ft)
- Crew: 250
- Armament: 2 × 4.5" ( 114mm ) guns, seacat missile & triple barrelled a/s mortars
- Aircraft carried: Wasp helicopter

HMS Berwick was a Rothesay- or Type 12M-class anti-submarine frigate of the British Royal Navy. She was built by Harland & Wolff and launched on 15 December 1959.

== Design and construction ==
The Rothesay class was an improved version of the Whitby-class anti-submarine frigate, with nine Rothesays ordered in the 1954–55 shipbuilding programme for the Royal Navy to supplement the six Whitbys.

Berwick was 370 feet 0 inches (112.78 m) long overall and 360 feet 0 inches (109.73 m) between perpendiculars, with a beam of 41 feet 0 inches (12.50 m) and a draught of 13 feet 6 inches (4.11 m). The Rothesays were powered by the same Y-100 machinery used by the Whitby-class. Two Babcock & Wilcox water-tube boilers fed steam at 550 pounds per square inch (3,800 kPa) and 850 °F (454 °C) to two sets of geared steam turbines which drove two propeller shafts, fitted with large (2 feet (0.61 m) diameter) slow-turning propellers. The machinery was rated at 30,000 shaft horsepower (22,000 kW), giving a speed of 29.5 knots (33.9 mph; 54.6 km/h). Crew was about 212 officers and men. (Note: Conway's states the crew of a Rothesay ranged from 200–235, while Jane's Fighting Ships 1962–63 states a crew of 200 (9 officers and 191 ratings))

A twin 4.5-inch (113 mm) Mark 6 gun mount was fitted forward, with 350 rounds of ammunition carried. It was originally intended to fit a twin 40 mm L/70 Bofors anti-aircraft mount aft, but in 1957 it was decided to fit the Seacat anti-aircraft missile instead. Seacat was not yet ready, and Berwick was completed with a single L/60 40 mm Bofors mount aft as a temporary anti-aircraft armament. The design anti-submarine armament consisted of twelve 21-inch torpedo-tubes (eight fixed and two twin rotating mounts) for Mark 20E Bidder homing anti-submarine torpedoes, backed up by two Limbo anti-submarine mortars fitted aft. The Bidder homing torpedoes proved unsuccessful however, being too slow to catch modern submarines, and the torpedo tubes were soon removed.

The ship was fitted with a Type 293Q surface/air search radar on the foremast, with a Type 277 height-finding radar on a short mast forward of the foremast. A Mark 6M fire control system (including a Type 275 radar) for the 4.5 inch guns was mounted above the ship's bridge, while a Type 974 navigation radar was also fitted. The ship's sonar fit consisted of Type 174 search, Type 170 fire control sonar for Limbo and a Type 162 sonar for classifying targets on the sea floor.

Berwick was laid down at Harland & Wolff's Belfast shipyard on 16 June 1958, was launched on 15 December 1959 and completed on 1 June 1961. She was the tenth ship of that name to serve with the Royal Navy.

== Operational service ==
From 1961 to 1963 Berwick was leader of the 5th Frigate Squadron, under the command of Captain David Dunbar-Nasmith.

On 16 November 1962, a Westland Whirlwind helicopter from the aircraft carrier Hermes with five men aboard, including the politicians Lord Windlesham and John Cronin crashed off St Davids Head. Berwick took part in search operations after the crash, and while three survivors (including Cronin) were rescued by helicopters, Lord Windlesham's body was not found.

Between 1963 and 1965 Berwick was leader of the 21st Escort Squadron. On 12 September 1964, during the Sunda Straits Crisis, Berwick was part of the escort for the aircraft carrier Victorious when the carrier transited the Lombok Strait on passage from Australia to Singapore after Indonesia had denied use of the Sunda Strait. On 10 April 1966, while taking part in the Beira Patrol, to enforce the oil blockade of Rhodesia (now Zimbabwe), she stopped and boarded the Greek oil tanker SS Manuella, which was heading for Beira, forcing the tanker to turn away. However, after Berwick left to refuel, Manuella, changed course and headed for Beira again, but was stopped by the frigate Puma. Berwick was under refit in January 1968, with the refit completing on 13 March 1971, adding facilities for operating a helicopter and a Seacat surface-to-air missile launcher.

During the first week in November 1971, Berwick collided with the frigate Phoebe in Portsmouth Harbour, whilst leaving for the West Indies. Both ships were ordered to dock for damage assessment, and underwent repairs for minor damage.

From July 1975 to April 1976, she went around the world via the Suez and Panama canals. Other ships in the flotilla included Ajax, Plymouth, Llandaff, Rothesay and Glamorgan. Destinations included Gibraltar, Malta, Egypt (Port Said), India (Madras), Singapore, Hong Kong, Australia (Fremantle, Hobart and Sydney), New Zealand (Nelson and Timaru), Fiji, Samoa, Hawaii, California (San Diego and Long Beach), Panama and finally Curaçao. On 9 January 1976, Stan Whitehead, the Speaker of the New Zealand House of Representatives collapsed while attending a welcoming meal aboard Berwick in Port Nelson. He was rushed to hospital, but was pronounced dead on arrival.

In January 1977, when the United Kingdom enlarged its Exclusive economic zone to 200 nautical miles (370 km), Berwick was deployed in patrolling the EEZ, protecting fishing stocks and oil fields. In 1977, she attended the Silver Jubilee Fleet Review with sisterships Plymouth and Rothesay. At this time she was part of the 8th Frigate Squadron. Industrial action led to plans to fit Berwick with a towed array sonar to be cancelled, and in December 1980 she was paid off into reserve with the standby squadron. By early 1982, Berwick was being considered for disposal as a result of the 1981 Defence White Paper, which proposed cuts in the Royal Navy's surface fleet.

The Argentine invasion of the Falkland Islands in April 1982 changed these plans, as frigates were brought back from standby to active service to take the place of ships that had been sent down to the South Atlantic. Berwick, which was in poor material condition, suffering from serious corrosion and not having undergone any maintenance for many months, was at first used as a source of spare parts to enable sister ship Falmouth to return to service. In June that year, work began at Chatham Dockyard to refit Berwick, allowing her to be recommissioned on 5 August 1982, joining the 5th Frigate Squadron. Berwick conducted two successful post war tours with the South Atlantic task forces, in 1982–83. Her final years saw her active on West Indian training cruises, and she was paid off in 1985.

Berwick was sunk as a target ship on 18 August 1986 by a Tigerfish torpedo, which was fired from the submarine Tireless.

== Bibliography ==
- Blackman, Raymond V. B. (1962). Jane's Fighting Ships 1962–63. London: Sampson Low, Marston & Co., Ltd.
- Colledge, J. J.; Warlow, Ben (2006) [1969]. Ships of the Royal Navy: The Complete Record of All Fighting Ships of the Royal Navy from the 15th Century to the Present (3rd Rev ed.). London: Chatham Publishing. ISBN 978-1-86176-281-8. OCLC 67375475.
- Critchley, Mike (1992). British Warships Since 1945: Part 5: Frigates. Liskeard, UK: Maritime Press. ISBN 0-907771-13-0.
- Friedman, Norman (2008). British Destroyers & Frigates: The Second World War and After. Barnsley, UK: Seaforth Publishing. ISBN 978-1-84832-015-4.
- Gardiner, Robert; Chumbley, Stephen, eds. (1995). Conway's All The World's Fighting Ships 1947–1995. Annapolis, Maryland, USA: Naval Institute Press. ISBN 1-55750-132-7.
- Marriott, Leo (1983). Royal Navy Frigates 1945–1983. Shepperton, Surrey, UK: Ian Allan Ltd. ISBN 0-7110-1322-5.
- Roberts, John (2009). Safeguarding the Nation: The Story of the Modern Royal Navy. Annapolis, Maryland, US: Naval Institute Press. ISBN 978-1-59114-812-8.
- Sturtivant, Ray; Ballance, Theo (1994). The Squadrons of the Fleet Air Arm. Tonbridge, Kent, UK: Air Britain (Historians) Ltd. ISBN 0-85130-223-8.
