= F36 =

F36 or F.XXXVI may refer to:

- Fokker F.XXXVI, a 1934 Dutch four-engined 32-passenger airliner
- Hirth F-36, an aircraft engine
- HMS Nubian (F36), a 1937 British Royal Navy Tribal-class destroyer
- HMS Whitby (F36), a British Royal Navy Whitby-class anti-submarine frigate
