= Rothesay-class frigate =

Class of frigate of the Royal Navy

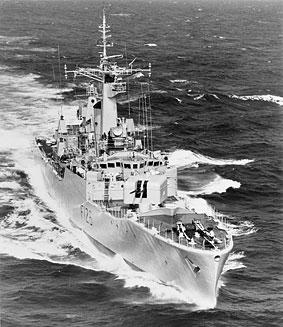
- HMS Plymouth

Class overview
- Name: Rothesay class
- Operators: Royal Navy; Royal New Zealand Navy; South African Navy
- Preceded by: Type 12 Whitby
- Succeeded by: Type 12I Leander
- Completed: 14
- Lost: 5 (as targets) + 1 (accident)
- Retired: 8

General characteristics as built
- Type: Frigate
- Displacement: 2,150 long tons (2,185 t) standard; 2,560 long tons (2,601 t) full load
- Length: 370 ft (110 m) o/a
- Beam: 41 ft (12 m)
- Draught: 17.3 ft (5.3 m)
- Propulsion: Y-100 plant; 2 × Babcock & Wilcox boilers, 2 English Electric steam turbines, 30,000 shp (22,000 kW) on 2 shafts
- Speed: 30 knots (56 km/h)
- Range: 400 tons oil fuel; 5,200 nautical miles (9,630 km) at 12 knots (22 km/h)
- Complement: 152
- Sensors & processing systems: Radar Type 293Q target indication; Radar Type 275 fire control on director Mark 6M; Radar Type 277Q height finder; Radar Type 974 navigation; Type 1010 Cossor Mark 10 IFF; Type 903 radar (MRS-3 system); Sonar Type 174 search; Sonar Type 162 target classification; Sonar Type 170 attack
- Armament: 1 × twin 4.5in gun Mark 6; 1 × 40 mm Bofors gun Mark 7; 2 × Limbo anti-submarine mortar Mark 10; 12 × 21-in anti-submarine torpedo tubes (removed or never installed)

General characteristics (as modified)
- Displacement: 2,380 long tons (2,418 t); 2,800 long tons (2,845 t) full load
- Complement: 235
- Sensors & processing systems: Radar Type 993 target indication; Radar Type 903 fire control on director MRS3; Radar Type 978 navigation; Type 1010 Cossor Mark 10 IFF; Sonar Type 177 search; Sonar Type 162 target classification; Sonar Type 170 attack
- Armament: 1 × twin 4.5in gun Mark 6; 1 × Sea Cat GWS-20 SAM; 2 × 20 mm Oerlikon guns; 1 × Limbo anti-submarine mortar Mark 10; 2 × 8-barrel 3in Knebworth/Corvus countermeasures launchers
- Aircraft carried: 1 × Westland Wasp HAS.1 MATCH helicopter
- Notes: Other characteristics as per above

The Rothesay class, or Type 12M frigates were a class of frigates serving with the Royal Navy, South African Navy (where they were called President-class frigates) and the Royal New Zealand Navy.

The original Type 12 frigates, the Whitby class, were designed as first-rate ocean-going convoy escorts in the light of experience gained during World War II. However, such were the capabilities and potential of the design that it was deemed suitable for use as a fast fleet anti-submarine warfare escort. As such, a repeat and improved Type 12 design was prepared, known as the Type 12M (M for "modified") and called the Rothesay class after the lead ship. A total of twelve vessels were constructed, with the lead ship being laid down in 1956, two years after the last Whitby. The design was successful and popular, serving the Royal Navy and South African Navy well into the 1980s, and serving with distinction in the Falklands War.

The class was highly adaptable and further modifications led to the equally successful Leander-class (Type 12I).

== Design ==
The Type 12M retained the hull design of the Type 12, that allowed high cruising speed to be maintained in heavy seas, critical to the success of anti-submarine warfare in the era of the threat of the high-speed Soviet submarine. Armament and the propulsion plant remained largely unchanged. The main external differences were an enlarged raked and streamlined funnel (retroactively fitted to the Whitbys) and a modified after deckhouse, enlarged to carry the SeaCat anti-aircraft missile launcher and its associated GWS-20 director and handling rooms as it became available. This weapon was not available at the time the first ships in class were completed, and either a twin Bofors 40 mm gun in a "Stabilised Tachymetric Anti-Aircraft Gun" (STAAG) mounting (Rothesay) or a single Bofors 40 mm gun on a Mk.7 mount was shipped in lieu. The arrangement of the torpedo tubes was also altered in the new design, with four fixed tubes firing aft at 45° on each beam, in front of a trainable twin mounting; the reverse of the arrangement on the Whitbys. A suitable weapon was never developed for these tubes, so they remained unused, or were never fitted. Internally, electrical generation capacity was increased to handle the increasing demands created by improved ship electronics. Accommodation standards were also improved, with partial bunking and air conditioning. Such was the success of the Rothesay design that it was elaborated into the excellent general purpose Leander-class frigate, the Type 12I.

== Modification ==
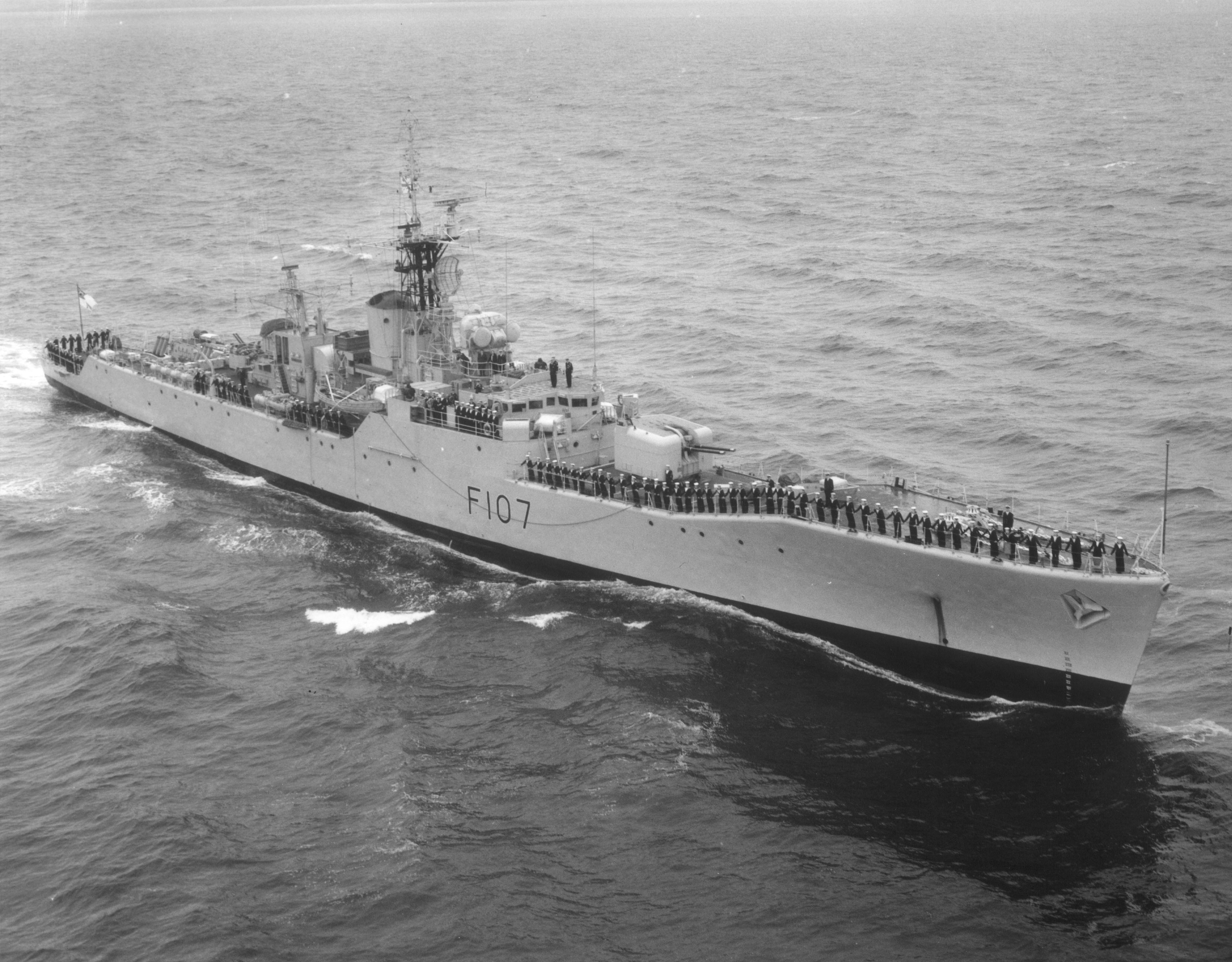
Rothesay before her Seacat/helicopter upgrade – note 40 mm gun in stern

Increasing submarine performance in the 1960s demanded detection and engagement of targets at a greater distance from the fleet. Detection was improved with new sonar designs such as the Type 177 search and Type 199 Variable depth. To attack targets at a greater range, the Royal Navy adopted the MATCH (Medium-range Anti-submarine Torpedo Carrying Helicopter) system. MATCH was essentially the Westland Wasp HAS.1, a lightweight navalised development of the Saro P.531 (and related to the Army's Westland Scout) helicopter small enough to operate from the small hangar and flight deck that could be fitted to contemporary frigate designs, yet large enough to carry a pair of anti-submarine homing torpedoes (US Mark 44 or 46 types), allowing engagement of underwater targets at some distance from the parent vessel, outside the range of the shipboard Limbo anti-submarine mortars. To allow MATCH to be carried, all of the Type 12M class were modified and modernised, beginning with Rothesay from 1966 and finishing in 1972.

The after superstructure was removed, along with the foremost Limbo mortar, with the well being plated over to create a small flight deck. A small hangar was constructed in front of this, on top of which the GWS-20 SeaCat missile and director was (finally) shipped. The mainmast was replaced by an enclosed design, carrying the Type 1010 IFF antennas, and the funnel height was increased to carry the hot exhaust gasses over the taller superstructure. The electronics fit was also upgraded from the World War II era sets fitted in the Whitbys. A large, enclosed foremast replaced the short lattice one, carrying the distinctive "quarter cheese" antennas associated with the Type 993 target indicator. The Mark 6M director was replaced with the MRS3 Mod 3 system carrying radar Type 903, the later more automated and compact 1967–73 version of MRS3 using transistor electronics and analogue computers allowing the removal of the Type 277Q height finder. Additionally, Knebworth/Corvus 3-inch countermeasures launchers were fitted on either side of the bridge, as were a pair of World War II vintage 20 mm Oerlikon guns for "policing" work (and strictly limited anti-aircraft defence).

The extensive modifications of the Rothesays brought their armament and anti-submarine capabilities into line with that of the original Leander-class vessels. However the last four Leanders had Doppler full spectrum 184 sonar which gave a clearer faster-read sonar, and all the Leanders originally had long range air warning and AD capabilities and communication decks, while the Rothesays remained specialised anti-submarine frigates designed to perform better at that single purpose. In 1978, Rothesay went into refit for two years at a cost of £33.4 million Yarmouth and Plymouth completed similar refits in 1981, which included fitting Type 994 short range warning radar and target indicator essentially (Plessy AWS1) in the old antenna, giving faster screen data in the Rothesays' operations room. This recent refit and marginally better radar resulted in their useful despatch for use in the Falklands War. It was planned to refit Rhyl, Brighton, Berwick and Falmouth with the very long range 2031 passive towed arrays which could listen for Soviet subs at ranges of 100 miles (160 km) plus. In the immediate aftermath of the Falklands War Berwick and Falmouth twice deployed south for post-war patrols in 1982–83, probably ending plans to refit them as towed array frigates, as well as sister ship Rhyl which suffered mechanical failure when ordered south, and Brighton which was scrapped following the 1981 Nott Defence Review and never transferred to the standby force.

== Service ==
The Rothesays served throughout the 1960s and 1970s, with Londonderry converted into a weapons and electronics trials vessel in 1975. The successful performance of the Rothesays, and the ability they showed for sustained operation in rough North Atlantic sea conditions during the 1976 Cod War, showed that they were still relevant to the Royal Navy's main role of displaying that it had the ability to restrict Soviet submarine penetration through the Greenland-Iceland-UK Gap during the intensification of the Cold War. A more generous naval budget in the late 1970s provided by the new Prime Minister, the former RN Clerk James Callaghan, led to a provisional decision to retain the Rothesays through the 1980s with a second long refit. Plymouth, Yarmouth, and Rothesay were given full two year refits in 1978–81 with some significant updates of radar.

At the beginning of 1982, many of the class had been relegated to the Standby Squadron, likely to be disposed of following the 1981 defence review, with their sister ships likely to follow suit. However, the outbreak of the Falklands War reprieved the class. Plymouth and Yarmouth were despatched with the task force, with Plymouth playing one of the most active roles of any ship. While the class proved highly seaworthy in the rough South Atlantic, particularly in the winter patrols that followed, the initial favourable assessment of their performance in the war has been revised. It is questionable whether Seacat achieved a single kill, although both Yarmouth and Plymouth claim single shared hits on Douglas A-4 Skyhawk. Plymouth's Wasp helicopter guided an AS-12 missile onto the elderly surface-running submarine ARA Santa Fe, but only after she had been prevented from diving by depth charges from the destroyer HMS Antrim and from a Wessex and a Lynx helicopter. On 1 May Yarmouth and the modern Type 22 frigate HMS Brilliant detected submarine ARA San Luis, which fired at least one German anti-ship SST-4 torpedo at them, but they failed to sink the submarine in 20 hours of mortar, torpedo and depth charge attacks. In the following weeks, the limitations of the Rothesay's lack of modern sonar or link 10 data link were exposed, although Yarmouth saw the second firing of the second Exocet and may have decoyed it successfully with chaff it fired.

Other than Brighton the rest of the class were refitted for post war service, allowing the losses and damages suffered by the Royal Navy during the conflict to be rapidly made good. Berwick and Falmouth had been retained in a state of high readiness in the standby squadron, in the expectation they would be given a further long refit, possibly as towed array frigates. Their sister Lowestoft had been tested in this role. Berwick in particular still proved useful after its short refit, giving another three years' operational service, until mid 1985. The class paid off throughout the 1980s, with Rothesay finally paying off in 1988. The demise of the class also saw the withdrawal of the Wasp helicopter, the Leanders having been upgraded to carry the Westland Lynx.

== New Zealand ships ==
The New Zealand Navy ordered two Type 12 ships in February 1957. Hastings was transferred as Otago while under construction, and Taranaki was ordered directly from the builders. They introduced bunk rather than traditional hammock bedding and rather different messing arrangements from the RN Type 12s. The ships were fitted with Seacat missiles by 1964. Unlike the Royal Navy Rothesays, Otago and Taranaki actually were armed with the Mk 20 heavyweight anti-submarine torpedoes, but abandoned them in the mid-1960s when it was clear the RN would only develop the weapons for submarines. The official reason for the RNZN abandoning heavyweight torpedoes was the Mk 20 was too slow at 20 knots (37 km/h; 23 mph). Mk 32 tubes to fire Mk 44/46 12.75-inch US lightweight torpedoes were supplied to New Zealand about 1971 as surplus from life-expired, early 1960s USN Fleet Rehabilitation and Modernization destroyers and fitted to all RNZN frigates in 1971 as a matter of policy to replace the Limbo mortars, which were removed at major refits in July 1974. A minority of the RNZN officers and ratings opposed the change, on the grounds the mortars were more effective for cold war warning. New Zealand considered modernising Taranaki with gas turbines but retired the ships after 1981 when two surplus Leander-class frigates were offered for sale by the British.

== South African ships (President class) ==
Three Type 12 frigates were ordered as part of the Simonstown Naval Agreement. They were identical to the Royal Navy vessels when built but were altered during refits. The three ships were named after presidents of the Boer republics:

- President Kruger – after Paul Kruger
- President Steyn – after Martinus Theunis Steyn
- President Pretorius – after Marthinus Wessel Pretorius

The modernisation involved installing a hangar and flight deck for a Westland Wasp helicopter, removing the Limbo mortar to form the flight deck, replacing the air search radar and fire control system and adding two triple 12.75-inch (324 mm) anti-submarine torpedo tubes.

The ships proved difficult to maintain due to the arms embargo and President Steyn was decommissioned in 1980 to provide spare parts.

== Construction programme ==
Pennant	Name	Builder	Ordered	Laid Down	Launched	Accepted into service (Note: The term used in Navy Estimates and Defence Estimates is "accepted into service". Hansard has used the term acceptance date. Leo Marriott in his various books uses the term "completed", as does Jane's Fighting Ships. These terms all mean the same thing: the date the Navy accepts the vessel from the builder. This date is important because maintenance cycles, etc. are generally calculated from the acceptance date.)	Commissioned	Estimated building cost (Note: "Unit cost, i.e. excluding cost of certain items (e.g. aircraft, First Outfits)." Text from Defences Estimates)	Fate
Royal Navy
F101	Yarmouth	(a) & (b) John Brown and Co Ltd, Clydebank.		29 November 1957	23 March 1959	March 1960	26 March 1960	£3,505,000 reconstructed 30 September 1969	Paid off April 1986, sunk as target July 1987.
F107	Rothesay	(a) & (b) Yarrow & Co Ltd, Glasgow.		6 November 1956	9 December 1957	April 1960	23 April 1960	£3,715,000 reconstructed 5 July 1968	Paid off 30 March 1988, sold for scrapping 1988.
F108	Londonderry	(a) & (b) JS White & Co Ltd, Cowes, Isle of Wight.		15 November 1956	20 May 1958	July 1960	18 October 1961	£3,570,000 reconstructed 19 December 1969,	Paid off 29 March 1984, sunk as target 15 June 1989.
F129	Rhyl	(a) HM Dockyard, Portsmouth (b) English Electric Co Ltd, Rugby.		29 January 1958	23 April 1959	November 1960	31 October 1960	£3,625,000 reconstructed 16 June 1972	Paid off 1982, sunk as target September 1985.
F126	Plymouth	(a) HM Dockyard, Devonport (b) English Electric Co Ltd, Rugby.		1 July 1958	20 July 1959	June 1961	11 May 1961	£3,510,000 reconstructed 28 February 1969	Paid off 26 April 1988, transferred to Warship Preservation Trust April 1989. Scrapped in Aliaga, Turkey, October 2014.
F115	Berwick	(a) & (b) Harland & Wolff Ltd, Belfast.		16 June 1958	15 December 1959	June 1961	1 June 1961	£3,650,000 reconstructed 13 March 1971	Paid off 1985, sunk as target September 1986.
F113	Falmouth	(a) Swan, Hunter & Wigham Richardson Ltd, Wallsend-on-Tyne (b) The Wallsend Slipway & Engineering Co Ltd, Wallsend-on-Tyne (b) Parsons Marine Turbines Co Ltd, Wallsend-on-Tyne.		23 November 1957	15 December 1959	July 1961	25 July 1961	£3,805,000 reconstructed 18 December 1970	Paid off July 1980, to standby. Reactivated 1982 for South Atlantic patrols. Struck 1984. Sold for scrapping 1989.
F103	Lowestoft	(a) & (b) Alexander Stephens and Sons Ltd, Linthouse, Glasgow.		9 June 1958	23 June 1960	October 1961	26 September 1961	£3,510,000 reconstructed 29 May 1970	Paid off 1985, sunk as target 16 June 1986.
F106	Brighton	(a) & (b) Yarrow & Co Ltd, Glasgow.		23 July 1957	30 October 1959	October 1961	28 September 1961	£3,600,000 reconstructed 18 February 1972	Paid off Nov 1981, sold for scrapping 16 September 1985.
	Weymouth	(a) Harland & Wolff Ltd, Belfast.		10 April 1959					Cancelled 1960, and completed as the Leander-class frigate Leander.
	Fowey	(a) Cammell Laird and Co (Shipbuilders and Engineers) Ltd, Birkenhead.		19 October 1950					Cancelled 1960, and completed as the Leander-class frigate Ajax.
	Hastings (i)	(a) JI Thornycroft Ltd, Southampton.	February 1956						To New Zealand February 1957 (see HMNZS Otago below).
	Hastings (i)	(a) Yarrow & Co Ltd, Glasgow.		2 December 1959					In 1960 changed to be completed as the Leander-class frigate Dido.
Royal New Zealand Navy
F111	HMNZS Otago (ex Hastings)	(a) JI Thornycroft Ltd, Southampton.	February 1956 (for RN); February 1957 (for RNZN)	5 September 1957	11 December 1958		22 June 1960		Stricken 1983. Scrapped 1987.
F148	HMNZS Taranaki	(a) JS White & Co Ltd, Cowes, Isle of Wight.		27 June 1958	19 August 1959		28 March 1961		Stricken 1982. Sold as scrap 1987 and scrapped 1988.
South African Navy
F150	SAS President Kruger	(a) Yarrow & Co Ltd, Glasgow.		6 April 1960	21 October 1960		1 October 1962		Sunk on 18 February 1982, after a collision at sea with the replenishment ship SAS Tafelberg.
F147	SAS President Steyn	(a) Alex Stephen & Sons Ltd, Linthouse, Glasgow.		20 May 1960	23 November 1961		26 April 1963		Paid off 1984. Sold for breaking up 1990.
F145	SAS President Pretorius	(a) Yarrow & Co Ltd, Glasgow.		21 November 1960	28 September 1962		4 March 1964		Paid off 1985, sold for breaking up 1990.

== Deck codes after midlife refits ==
Name	Pennant	Deck Code
Rothesay	F107	RO
Londonderry	F108	LD
Brighton	F106	BR
Yarmouth	F101	YM
Falmouth	F113	FM
Rhyl	F129	RL
Lowestoft	F103	LT
Berwick	F115	BK
Plymouth	F126	PL

== See also ==
- River-class destroyer escort – Australian ships based on the Type 12.
- Whitby-class frigate – the original Type 12 design.
- Leander-class frigate – the Type 12M frigate, a general-purpose design following on from the success of the Type 12I
