= Fan-beam antenna =

Directional antenna

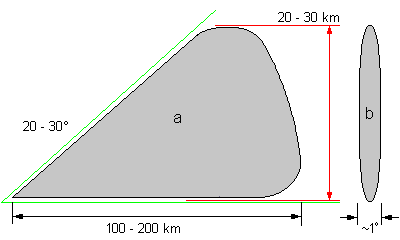
Side and frontal view of the beam produced

A fan-beam antenna is a directional antenna producing a main beam having a narrow beamwidth in one dimension and a wider beamwidth in the other dimension. This pattern will be achieved by a truncated paraboloid reflector or a circular paraboloid reflector. Since the reflector is narrow in the vertical plane and wide in the horizontal, it produces a beam that is wide in the vertical plane and narrow in the horizontal. (The larger the antenna dimension, the narrower the beam.)

== Principle ==
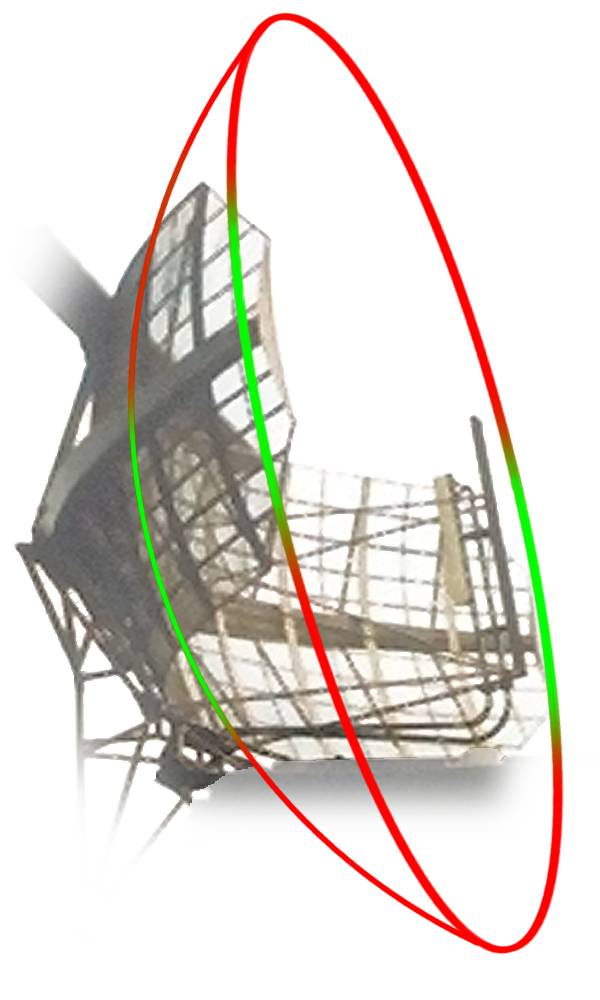
Circular paraboloid (red) and its truncated reflector (green).

In a parabolic antenna, the feed horn is placed at the focal point and irradiate the reflector. The latter send back in space a highly focused parallel beam that one can describe as pencil shape.

When one removes a section of the paraboloid, rays coming from that section are lost. In keeping the antenna only in the horizontal or the vertical, only the rays at right angle to the remaining antenna section will be focused and thus create a narrow beam in that direction while being wide in the other direction.

== Usage ==
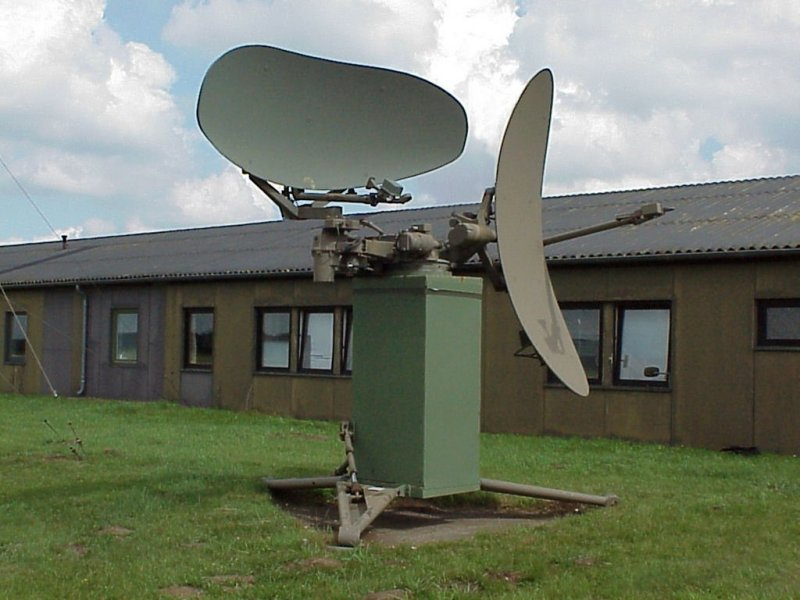
Antennas of an AN/FPN-36 Precision approach radar, with search (left) and height-finding (right)

Fan beam antennas are used in radar sets. Primary radar in airport have often fan-beam with the section of antenna oriented horizontally to give a narrow beam in azimuth. They must then be complemented with a height finders have the beam oriented horizontally because they cannot locate the altitude. Those have their reflector rotated 90 degrees and produce a beam that is wide in the horizontal plane but narrow in the vertical.
