= HMS Whitby (F36) =

1956 Type 12 or Whitby-class frigate of the Royal Navy

History

United Kingdom
- Name: HMS Whitby
- Ordered: 2 February 1951
- Builder: Cammell Laird and Co Ltd, Birkenhead
- Laid down: 30 September 1952
- Launched: 2 July 1954
- Commissioned: 10 July 1956
- Decommissioned: 1974
- Identification: Pennant number: F36
- Fate: Sold for scrapping in 1979

General characteristics
- Class & type: Whitby-class frigate
- Displacement: 2,150 tons (2,185 tonnes); 2,560 tons full load (2,600 tonnes)
- Length: 360 ft (109.7 m) w/l; 370 ft (112.8 m) o/a
- Beam: 41 ft (12.5 m)
- Draught: 17 ft (5.18 m)
- Propulsion: Y-100 plant; 2 Babcock & Wilcox boilers, 2 English Electric steam turbines, 2 shafts, 30,000 shp (22 MW)
- Speed: 30 kn (56 km/h)
- Range: 370 tons oil fuel, 4,200 nmi (7,780 km) at 12 knots (22 km/h)
- Complement: 152, later 225
- Sensors & processing systems: Radar Type 293Q target indication, later; Radar Type 993; Radar Type 277Q height finding (later removed); Radar Type 275 fire control on director Mark 6M; Radar Type 262 fire control on STAAG; Radar Type 974 navigation; Type 1010 Cossor Mark 10 IFF; Sonar Type 174 search; Sonar Type 162 target classification; Sonar Type 170 attack
- Armament: 1 × twin 4.5 in (114 mm) gun Mark 6; 1 × twin 40 mm Bofors gun Mark 2 STAAG, later; 1 × single 40 mm Bofors gun Mark 7; 2 × Limbo A/S mortar Mark 10; 12 × 21 in A/S torpedo tubes (removed or never shipped)

HMS Whitby was a Whitby-class or Type 12 anti-submarine frigate of the Royal Navy of the United Kingdom built by Cammell Laird and Co Ltd, Birkenhead. She was launched on 2 July 1954 and commissioned on 10 July 1956.

== Design ==
The Whitby-class was designed as a class of specialist anti-submarine warships, intended to counter fast modern diesel-electric submarines. As such, the design was required to reach a speed of at least 27 knots (31 mph; 50 km/h), maintaining high speed in rough weather conditions and have a range of 4,500 nautical miles (5,200 mi; 8,300 km) at 12 knots (14 mph; 22 km/h). To meet these requirements, the Type 12s had a new hull form and, unlike the contemporary Type 41 anti-aircraft and Type 61 air direction frigates, were powered by steam turbines.

Whitby was 370 feet 0 inches (112.78 m) long overall and 360 feet 0 inches (109.73 m) at the waterline, with a beam of 41 feet 0 inches (12.50 m) and a draught of 11 feet 0 inches (3.35 m) forward and 13 feet 0 inches (3.96 m) at the propellers. The ships were powered by the new Y-100 machinery in which the ship's boilers and steam turbines were designed as a closely integrated set of machinery to increase efficiency. Two Babcock & Wilcox water-tube boilers fed steam at 550 pounds per square inch (3,800 kPa) and 850 °F (454 °C) to two sets of geared steam turbines which drove two propeller shafts, fitted with large (2 feet (0.61 m) diameter) slow-turning propellers. The machinery was rated at 30,000 shaft horsepower (22,000 kW), giving a speed of 29 knots (33 mph; 54 km/h). Crew was about 189 when operated as a leader and 152 as an ordinary ship.

A twin 4.5-inch (113 mm) Mark 6 gun mount was fitted forward, with 350 rounds of ammunition carried, with close-in armament of a stabilised STAAG (Stabilised Tachymetric Anti-Aircraft Gun) twin Bofors 40 mm L/60 gun mount aft. The design anti-submarine armament consisted of twelve 21-inch torpedo-tubes (eight fixed and two twin rotating mounts) for Mark 20E Bidder homing anti-submarine torpedoes, backed up by two Limbo anti-submarine mortars fitted aft. The Bidder homing torpedoes proved unsuccessful however, being too slow to catch modern submarines, and the torpedo tubes were soon removed.

The ship was fitted with a Type 293Q surface/air search radar on the foremast, with a Type 277 height-finding radar on a short mast forward of the foremast. A Mark 6M fire control system (including a Type 275 radar) for the 4.5 inch guns was mounted above the ship's bridge, while a Type 974 navigation radar was also fitted. The ship's sonar fit consisted of Type 164 search, Type 170 fire control sonar for Limbo and a Type 162 sonar for classifying targets on the sea floor.

== Service ==
Whitby was laid down at Cammell Laird's Birkenhead shipyard on 30 September 1952, was launched on 2 July 1954 and completed on 10 July 1956.

On completion, she was assigned to the 3rd Training Squadron based at Londonderry Port. In 1960 Desmond Cassidi was appointed as her captain. During 1966 she saw service in the Mediterranean and Atlantic. In 1968 she undertook fishery protection duties off the coast of Greenland - the first ship to have visited those waters since 1966. In 1968 she took part in 'Navy Days' at Portsmouth Dockyard.

== Publications ==
- Blackman, Raymond V. B. (1960). Jane's Fighting Ships 1960–61. London: Sampson Low, Marston & Co. Ltd.
- Colledge, J. J.; Warlow, Ben (2006) [1969]. Ships of the Royal Navy: The Complete Record of All Fighting Ships of the Royal Navy from the 15th Century to the Present (3rd Rev ed.). London: Chatham Publishing. ISBN 978-1-86176-281-8. OCLC 67375475.
- Critchley, Mike (1992). British Warships Since 1945: Part 5: Frigates. Liskeard, UK: Maritime Press. ISBN 0-907771-13-0.
- Friedman, Norman (2008). British Destroyers & Frigates: The Second World War and After. Barnsley, UK: Seaforth Publishing. ISBN 978-1-84832-015-4.
- Gardiner, Robert; Chumbley, Stephen, eds. (1995). Conway's All The World's Fighting Ships 1947–1995. Annapolis, Maryland, USA: Naval Institute Press. ISBN 1-55750-132-7.
- Marriott, Leo (1983). Royal Navy Frigates 1945–1983. Shepperton, Surrey, UK: Ian Allan Ltd. ISBN 0-7110-1322-5.
