= HMS Ambush (P418) =

Amphion class submarine of the Royal Navy

- HMS Ambush (P418/S68)

History

United Kingdom
- Ordered: Very late in World War II
- Builder: Vickers Armstrong, Barrow-in-Furness
- Laid down: 17 May 1945
- Launched: 24 September 1945
- Commissioned: 22 July 1947
- Decommissioned: November 1967
- Fate: Sold to be broken up for scrap on 24 June 1971. Scrapped at Thos. W. Ward Inverkeithing in July 1971.

General characteristics
- Displacement: 1,360/1,590 tons (surface/submerged)
- Length: 293 ft 6 in (89.46 m)
- Beam: 22 ft 4 in (6.81 m)
- Draught: 18 ft 1 in (5.51 m)
- Propulsion: 2 × 2,150 hp Admiralty ML 8-cylinder diesel engine, 2 × 625 hp electric motors for submergence driving two shafts
- Speed: 18.5/8 knots (surface/submerged)
- Range: 10,500 nautical miles (19,400 km) at 11 knots (20 km/h) surfaced; 16 nautical miles (30 km) at 8 knots (15 km/h) or 90 nautical miles (170 km) at 3 knots (6 km/h) submerged
- Test depth: 350 ft (110 m)
- Complement: 60
- Armament: 6 × 21 inch (533 mm) (2 external) bow torpedo tube, 4 × 21" (2 external) stern torpedo tube, containing a total of 20 torpedoes; Mines: 26; 1 × 4" main deck gun, 3 × 0.303 machine gun, 1 × 20 mm AA Oerlikon 20 mm gun

HMS Ambush (P418/S68/S18), was an Amphion-class submarine of the Royal Navy, built by Vickers Armstrong and launched 24 September 1945.

In 1948 she took part in trials of the submarine snorkel. In 1951 she heard and decoded a distress message from HMS Affray, which was sunk with the ultimate loss of all 75 hands. In 1953 she took part in the Fleet Review to celebrate the Coronation of Queen Elizabeth II.

== Design ==
Like all Amphion-class submarines, Ambush had a displacement of 1,360 long tons (1,380 t) when at the surface and 1,590 long tons (1,620 t) while submerged. She had a total length of 293 feet 6 inches (89.46 m), a beam of 22 feet 4 inches (6.81 m), and a draught of 18 feet 1 inch (5.51 m). The submarine was powered by two Admiralty ML eight-cylinder diesel engines generating a power of 2,150 horsepower (1,600 kW) each. She also contained four electric motors each producing 625 horsepower (466 kW) that drove two shafts. She could carry a maximum of 219 tonnes (241 short tons) of diesel, although she usually carried between 159 and 165 tonnes (175 and 182 short tons).

The submarine had a maximum surface speed of 18.5 knots (34.3 km/h; 21.3 mph) and a submerged speed of 8 knots (15 km/h; 9.2 mph). When submerged, she could operate at 3 knots (5.6 km/h; 3.5 mph) for 90 nautical miles (170 km; 100 mi) or at 8 knots (15 km/h; 9.2 mph) for 16 nautical miles (30 km; 18 mi). When surfaced, she was able to travel 15,200 nautical miles (28,200 km; 17,500 mi) at 10 knots (19 km/h; 12 mph) or 10,500 nautical miles (19,400 km; 12,100 mi) at 11 knots (20 km/h; 13 mph). She was fitted with ten 21 inches (530 mm) torpedo tubes, one QF 4 inch naval gun Mk XXIII, one Oerlikon 20 mm cannon, and a .303 British Vickers machine gun. Her torpedo tubes were fitted to the bow and stern, and she could carry twenty torpedoes. Her complement was sixty-one crew members.

== Construction ==
Ambush was laid down at Vickers Armstrong's Barrow-in-Furness shipyard on 17 May 1945, was launched on 24 September 1945 and completed on 22 July 1947.

== Service ==
On commissioning, Ambush joined the 3rd Submarine Flotilla based at Rothesay, Scotland. The early post-war years saw the Royal Navy introduce the submarine snorkel (known as the Snort in British service), with a number of trials carried out on extended submarine operations using the snort in various weather conditions. Ambush set out from Rothesay on 10 February 1948 on an extended submerged cruise in Arctic waters between Jan Mayen and Bear Island. The submarine encountered a severe storm, which forced Ambush to the surface as she could not maintain depth control well enough to use the snort, returning to base on 18 March.

Ambush joined the 10 Submarine Flotilla based at Singapore in November 1959 and remained based in the Far East until 25 July 1967.

== Decommissioning and disposal ==
Following decommissioning, she was sold to Thos. W. Ward and arrived at Inverkeithing for breaking up on 5 July 1971.
