= Type 12 frigate =

Classes of ship

Type 12 frigate refers to several ship classes, most commonly the three ship classes of the Royal Navy designed during the 1950s and constructed during the 1960s.

- The first Type 12 frigates, designed as convoy escorts, were later named the Whitby class. Six operated in the Royal Navy, with one loaned to the Royal New Zealand Navy, and two built for the Indian Navy.
- The design of the Type 12 Modified (Type 12M) or Rothesay class was optimised towards anti-submarine warfare and fleet escort duties, and fitted with the Sea Cat missile system. Nine were built for the Royal Navy, two for the Royal New Zealand Navy, and three (as the 'President class') for the South African Navy.
- The third class, designed as an all-purpose warship, was known as the Type 12 Improved (Type 12I) or the Leander class. The class was made up of three 'batches'; the main differences between each batch being variations in propulsion machinery and weapons outfit. 26 were built for the Royal Navy, some of which later saw service in the navies of Chile, Ecuador, New Zealand, and Pakistan.

The Type 12 designation is sometimes used to refer to warship classes based on the Type 12 design, but constructed or operated by other naval forces. Some of these are still in service as of 2009:

- The Condell-class frigates of the Chilean Navy. Based on the Leander class, this class consisted of four ships, two purpose-built, and two former Royal Navy Leanders.
- The River-class destroyer escorts of the Royal Australian Navy. Six were constructed: two to the Rothesay design, two to the same design but modified to carry a variable-depth sonar and an Ikara missile system (which was retrofitted to the first two), and two to an Australian-designed Leander variant.
- The Nilgiri-class frigates of the Indian Navy. Six were constructed to an updated design based on the Leanders.
- The Godavari and Brahmaputra-class frigates of the Indian Navy. An enlarged Nilgiri design was used as the basis for six ships (three of each class), with the weapons outfit the main difference between them.
- The Van Speijk-class frigates of the Royal Netherlands Navy. Based on the Leander design but with Dutch radars, six ships were built. All six were later transferred to the Indonesian Navy and become Ahmad Yani-class frigate. All of them are renamed with Indonesian National Heroes.
