= Height finder =

Ground device to measure aircraft altitude

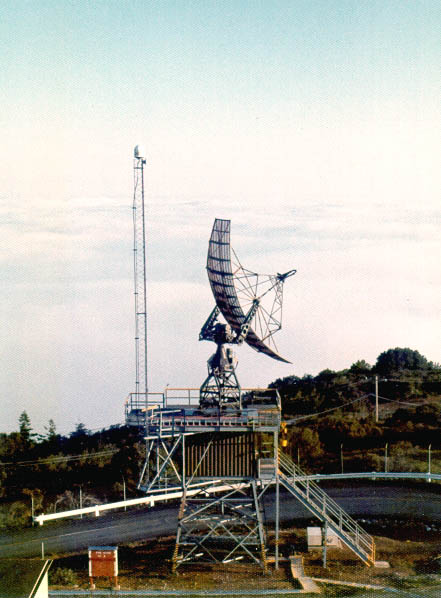
Mill Valley AFS height finder AN/FPS-6 using fan-beam antenna (1973).

A height finder is a ground-based aircraft altitude measuring device. Early height finders were optical range finder devices combined with simple mechanical computers, while later systems migrated to radar devices. The unique vertical oscillating motion of height finder radars led to them also being known as nodding radar. Devices combining both optics and radar were deployed by the U.S. Military.

== Optical ==
In World War II, a height finder was an optical rangefinder used to determine the altitude of an aircraft (actually the slant range from the emplacement which was combined with the angle of sight, in a mechanical computer, to produce altitude), used to direct anti-aircraft guns. Examples of American and Japanese versions exist. In the Soviet Union it was usually combined with optical rangefinders.

== Radar ==
A height finder radar is a type of 2-dimensional radar that measures altitude of a target.

The operator slews the antenna toward a desired bearing, identifies a target echo at a desired range on the range height indicator display, then bisects the target with a cursor that is scaled to indicate the approximate altitude of the target. Such systems often complement 2-dimensional radars which find distance and direction (search radar); thus using two 2-dimensional systems to obtain a 3-dimensional aerial picture. Height finding radars of the 1960s and 70s were distinguished by their antenna being tall, but narrow. As beam shape is a function of antenna shape, the height finder beam was flat and wide horizontally (i.e., not very good at determining bearing to the target), but very thin vertically, allowing accurate measurement of elevation angle, thus altitude.

Modern 3D radar sets find both azimuth and elevation, making separate height finder radars largely obsolete.

== See also ==
- Radar
- Air Ministry Experimental Station
