= Whitby-class frigate =

Class of frigate of the Royal Navy

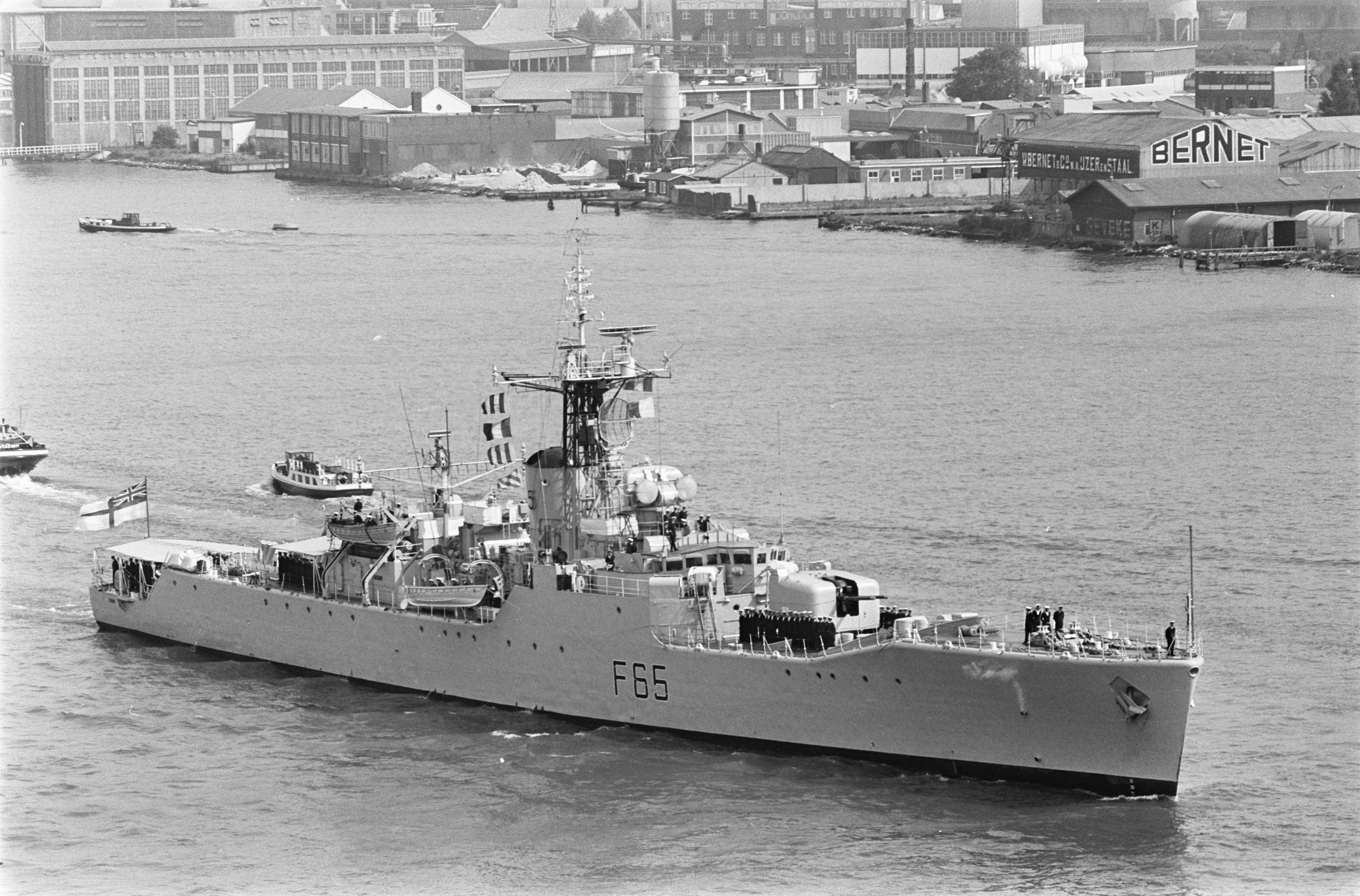
- HMS Tenby, a Whitby-class frigate, in Amsterdam, 1969

Class overview
- Name: Whitby class
- Builders: Vickers Armstrongs, Barrow; Cammell Laird, Birkenhead; Harland & Wolff, Belfast
- Operators: Royal Navy; Indian Navy; Royal New Zealand Navy
- Preceded by: Type 11 (never built)
- Succeeded by: Rothesay class
- In commission: 10 May 1956 (RN) – 31 August 1992 (IN)
- Completed: 6 + 2 Indian

General characteristics
- Type: Frigate
- Displacement: 2,150 tons (2,185 tonnes); 2,560 tons full load (2,600 tonnes)
- Length: 360 ft (110 m) w/l; 370 ft (110 m) o/a
- Beam: 41 ft (12 m)
- Draught: 17 ft (5.2 m)
- Propulsion: Y-100 plant; 2 Babcock & Wilcox boilers, 2 English Electric steam turbines, 2 shafts, 30,000 shp (22,000 kW)
- Speed: 30 kn (56 km/h)
- Range: 370 tons oil fuel, 4,200 nmi (7,780 km) at 12 knots (22 km/h)
- Complement: 152, later 225
- Sensors & processing systems: Radar Type 293Q target indication, later; Radar Type 993; Radar Type 277Q height finding (later removed); Radar Type 275 fire control on director Mark 6M; Radar Type 262 fire control on STAAG; Radar Type 974 navigation; Type 1010 Cossor Mark 10 IFF; Sonar Type 174 search; Sonar Type 162 target classification; Sonar Type 170 attack
- Armament: 1 × twin 4.5 in (113 mm) gun Mark 6; 1 × twin 40 mm Bofors gun Mark 2 STAAG, later; 1 × single 40 mm Bofors gun Mark 7; 2 × Limbo anti-submarine mortar Mark 10; 12 × 21-inch (533 mm) anti-submarine torpedo tubes (removed or never shipped)

The Type 12 or Whitby-class frigates were a six-ship class of anti-submarine frigates of the Royal Navy, which entered service late in the 1950s. They were designed in the early 1950s as first-rate ocean-going convoy escorts, in the light of experience gained during World War II. At this time, the Royal Navy were designing single-role escorts and the Whitbys were designed as fast convoy escorts capable of tackling high-speed submarines. However, this made the Whitbys more expensive and sophisticated to produce in large numbers in the event of a major war, and so the Type 14 "utility" or "second-rate" anti-submarine frigate was developed to complement the Type 12. Although themselves rapidly outdated, the Type 12 proved to be an excellent basis for a series of frigate designs used by the British and Commonwealth navies for the next 20 years.

== Design ==
Critical to the design of the Type 12 was the capability to steam for long periods of time in heavy seas, economically and at high speed. For this reason a novel hull form was devised, which, despite its appearance, was totally unrelated to that of the earlier Type 41 / Type 61 design. The hull showed the fine lines more typical of a destroyer, but had a raised forecastle with considerable flare. The forecastle deck was level to maintain maximum freeboard aft of the stem where it is most likely that waves will break across the deck. These two features meant that the hull not only cut through the water, but that spray was thrown upwards and outwards, away from the bridge and gun turret. This was especially important in high latitudes where war experience had shown that spray could cause rapid and undesirable ice build-up on the forecastle. The deck edges and hull also met at a curve rather than an angle, the anchors were recessed, and protrusions were kept to a minimum to limit the potential sources of ice build-up and spray generation. The Mark 6 gunhouse was large and heavy, so had to be carried low to maintain stability and give a good view over it from the bridge. The forecastle therefore had a very distinctive kink, allowing the position of the guns to be lowered. This had the added benefit of moving the bridge aft, where there was considerably less motion, improving the lot of the watchkeeper. The hull form, coupled with a twin-shaft double-reduction geared steam turbine plant (the Y-100) that operated at high temperature and pressure (for efficiency) and low revolutions, with new five-bladed low-cavitation propellers (for efficiency and quietness) lent themselves to the perfect hull for a high-speed, all-weather anti-submarine vessel.

Experience with the Type 15 frigate program, rebuilding wartime destroyers into fast anti-submarine frigates, had led to the adoption of a bridge design characteristic of Royal Navy escorts up to the Leander class of 1969. The covered bridge, where the ship was conned, was located above the operations room where the ship was fought, and there was a small pilot's position located to the front of the bridge, giving the indicative "T" shape when viewed from above. Whitby was unique in that her bridge face was vertical, her sisters having the windows mounted at an angle to the face, to cut down on internal reflections inside the bridge in low-light. There was also an open navigation bridge located above and behind the enclosed one.

The original funnel was a straight, cylindrical affair that was designed to resist a nuclear blast, but this was prone to down-draughting and did not clear the hot exhaust gasses particularly well. It was replaced by a heightened, raked, streamlined version with a characteristic domed top. This was incorporated in later build vessels, and in all of the subsequent Rothesay class. Only Scarborough retained the stubby vertical funnel throughout her career.

== Armament ==
The armament was based around two Limbo Mark 10 anti-submarine mortars. This allowed a three-bomb salvo to be placed both above and below the target, creating a convergent pressure wave more likely to assure a kill. The Limbos were mounted in a well on the quarterdeck, with a 360° arc of fire. Again, wartime experience had shown that the quarterdeck, perhaps not an obvious location for an ahead throwing weapon, was indeed the best location for such weapons where they were out of the spray towards the front of the vessel. The Limbo mortars were controlled by three sonars, the Type 174 search set, Type 162 target classification set and the Type 170 'pencil beam' targeting set. The lattice foremast carried the Type 293Q target indication set and the Type 974 navigation set, and a Type 277Q height finder was carried on a stump mast between the bridge and the mainmast. These sets were all derived from units of Second World War vintage.

Carrying the Limbos aft allowed the forecastle to be left clear for the twin 4.5in Mark 6 gun for anti-surface and limited anti-aircraft fire, controlled by a Mark 6M director with Type 285 radar mounted behind the bridge. Further anti-submarine capability was to be afforded by twelve 21-inch Mark 20E "Bidder" anti-submarine homing torpedoes, carried in fixed tubes; Four pairs were fixed firing forward on either beam, with a trainable pair behind these on each side. Ultimately the E (for "Escort" vessels) version of the Mark 20 torpedo was a failure as it was not nearly fast enough to catch its intended target, and the tubes were removed (in those cases where they had been fitted at all) and the torpedoes never deployed.

Self-defence against aircraft was provided by the elaborate STAAG weapon, a complex and ultimately failed exercise in engineering. The STAAG (Stabilised Tachymetric Anti-Aircraft Gun), consisted of two Bofors 40 mm L/60 guns, the radar Type 262 fire control set and a tachymetric computer. All this was carried on a common, stabilised, powered-operated gun mounting. Intended to function much as the modern close-in weapon system does, this weapon was ahead of the limits of technology at the time; it was overweight and overly complex and its sensitive valve electronics were a maintenance nightmare. Ultimately STAAG would be replaced by a simple and ubiquitous Bofors 40 mm gun on the single Mark 7 mounting.

== Service ==
The Whitbys served up until the 1970s, when increasing age and defence economies led to their gradual withdrawal or reassignment. In 1966, Blackpool was loaned to the Royal New Zealand Navy, while they waited for the delivery of HMNZS Canterbury, a Leander-class frigate. It would remain in New Zealand service until 1971 when it returned to the Royal Navy, and decommissioned that same year. All other ships, except Eastbourne and Torquay, were decommissioned in the 1970s. The latter two ships were decommissioned in 1984 and 1985 respectively. Scarborough and Tenby were intended to have been sold to Pakistan, but the country could not afford the refits required for the two ships, and thus the sale was cancelled. Blackpool was decommissioned for use as a target vessel in the Firth of Forth. After HMS Eastbourne was rammed in the Third Cod War in 1976, structural damage prevented further sea service, although the frigate and its steam turbines were still in good condition and Eastbourne became an engine room training ship alongside at HMS Caledonia at Rosyth. Torquay was modified and fitted with Computer Assisted Action Information System (CAAIS) for use as a trials and training ship.

== Construction programme ==
| Pennant | Name | (a) Hull builder (b) Main machinery manufacturers | Ordered | Laid down | Launched | Accepted into service | Commissioned | Estimated building cost (Note: "Unit cost, i.e. excluding cost of certain items (e.g. aircraft, First Outfits).") | Fate |
Royal Navy
| F43 | Torquay | (a) & (b) Harland & Wolff Ltd, Belfast | 6 March 1951 | 11 March 1953 | 1 July 1954 | 10 May 1956 | 10 May 1956 | £2,769,000 | Paid off 1985, sold for scrapping 1987 |
| F36 | Whitby | (a) & (b) Cammell Laird and Co Ltd, Birkenhead | 2 February 1951 | 30 September 1952 | 2 July 1954 | 19 July 1956 | 10 July 1956 | £3,081,000 | Paid off 1974, sold for scrapping 1979 |
| F63 | Scarborough | (a) Vickers Armstrongs (Shipbuilders) Ltd, Newcastle upon Tyne (b) Vickers Armstrongs (Engineers) Ltd, Barrow-in-Furness | 6 March 1951 | 11 September 1953 | 4 April 1955 | May 1957 | 10 May 1957 | £2,737,000 | Paid off 1972, sold for scrapping 1977 |
| F65 | Tenby | (a) & (b) Cammell Laird and Co Ltd, Birkenhead | 6 March 1951 | 23 June 1953 | 4 October 1955 | December 1957 | 18 December 1957 | £2,822,000 | Paid off 1972, sold for scrapping 1979 |
| F73 | Eastbourne | (a) Vickers Armstrongs (Shipbuilders) Ltd, High Walker, Newcastle upon Tyne (to launching stage) (a) Vickers Armstrongs (Shipbuilders) Ltd, Barrow-in-Furness (for completion) (b) Vickers Armstrongs (Engineers) Ltd, Barrow-in-Furness | 6 March 1951 | 13 January 1954 | 29 December 1955 | January 1958 | 9 January 1958 | £2,774,000 | Paid off 1984, sold for scrapping 1985 |
| F77 | Blackpool | (a) & (b) Harland & Wolff Ltd, Belfast | 6 March 1951 | 20 December 1954 | 14 February 1957 | August 1958 | 14 August 1958 | £3,269,000 | Loaned to New Zealand 1966 – 1971, paid off 1971, sold for scrapping 1980 |
Indian Navy
| F140 | Talwar | (a) Cammell Laird | | 7 June 1957 | 18 July 1958 | | 26 April 1959 | | Paid off 30 October 1985, broken up 1992. |
| F143 | Trishul | (a) Harland & Wolff | | 19 February 1957 | 18 June 1958 | | 13 January 1960 | | Paid off 31 August 1992, broken up 1996? |

In 1959 Triang Minic Ships produced a series of 1:1200 (one inch to 100 feet) metal models of Type 12 frigates, carrying the names Whitby, Tenby, Torquay and Blackpool. These toys were mass-produced in large numbers between 1959 and 1965, and remain sought after by collectors today. At the same time the Frog (models) company produced an accurate plastic model kit of a Type 12 frigate to a scale of 1:500. The moulds for this were sold to Russia in 1976, and it has been re-issued under the "Novo" trademark on several occasions.

== See also ==
- Rothesay-class frigate – Type 12M ("Modified") frigate
- Leander-class frigate – Type 12I ("Improved") frigate
- River-class destroyer escort – Australian ships based on the Type 12
- St. Laurent-class destroyer – Canadian ships based on the Type 12
- Van Speijk-class frigate – Dutch ships based on the Type 12I

== Sources ==
- Moore, George, "The dawn of the Salisbury, Leopard and Whitby class frigates" in Warship, 2004, Conways, 2004, ISBN 0-85177-948-4
- Purvis, M.K., "Post War RN Frigate and Guided Missile Destroyer Design 1944–1969", Transactions of the Royal Institution of Naval Architects (RINA), 1974
- Marriott, Leo, Royal Navy Frigates Since 1945, Second Edition, Ian Allan, Surrey, 1990 ISBN 0-7110-1915-0,
- Colledge, J. J.; Warlow, Ben (2006) [1969]. Ships of the Royal Navy: The Complete Record of All Fighting Ships of the Royal Navy from the 15th Century to the Present (3rd Rev ed.). London: Chatham Publishing. ISBN 978-1-86176-281-8. OCLC 67375475.
- Capt. John E. Moore, Warships of the Royal Navy; New Edition, Jane's Publishing, 1981 ISBN 0-7106-0105-0
- D. K. Brown & George Moore, Rebuilding the Royal Navy. Warship design since 1945, Chatham Publishing, 2003, ISBN 1-86176-222-4
