= Type 293 radar =

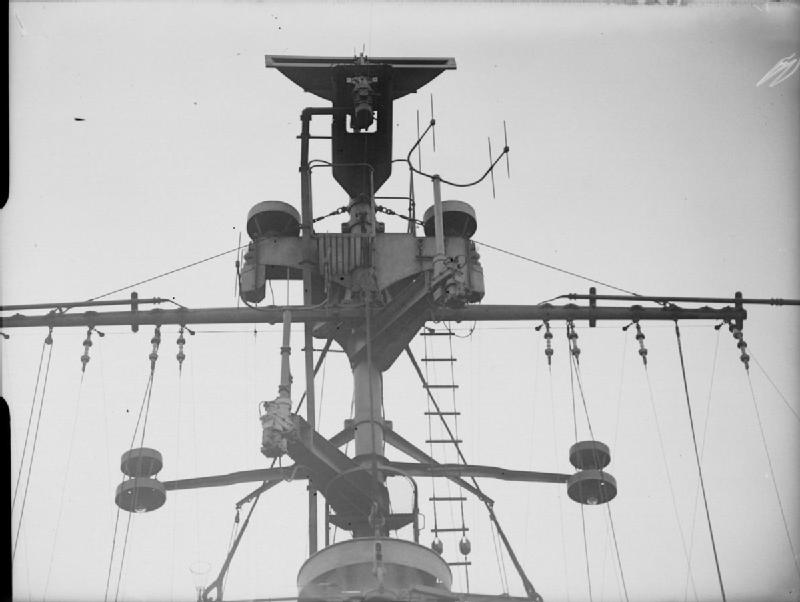
- A Type 293 AUR antenna at the upper center aboard HMS Swiftsure at Scapa Flow
- Country of origin: United Kingdom
- Introduced: 1945
- Type: Aerial-search radar
- Frequency: 2,997 MHz
- Beamwidth: 3.2°
- Range: 20 nmi (37 km; 23 mi)
- Altitude: 20,000 ft (6,100 m)
- Power: 500 kW

The Type 293 radar was designed as a short-range aerial-search radar for surface ships in 1945. It used the same transmitter as the Type 277 surface-search radar, but used a new antenna design intended to cover the area above the ship to provide air warning instead of surface search. The stabilised "cheese" antenna, 6 feet (1.8 m) diameter in the AUR antenna, was upgraded to 8 feet (2.4 m) in Type 293P and to 12 feet (3.7 m) in the postwar Type 293Q.

== Specifications ==
Type	Aerial outfit	Peak power (kW)	Frequency (MHz)	Wavelength (mm)	In service
293M	AUR	500	2,997	100	1945
293P	AQR	500	2,997	100	1945
293Q	ANS	500	2,997	100	1945

== Bibliography ==
- Friedman, Norman (1981). Naval Radar. London: Conway Maritime Press. ISBN 0-85177-238-2.
- Watson, Raymond C. Jr. (2009). Radar Origins Worldwide: History of Its Evolution in 13 Nations Through World War II. Trafford. ISBN 978-1-4269-2111-7.
