= Ægir-class patrol vessel =

Icelandic Coast Guard ship type, 1968–2021

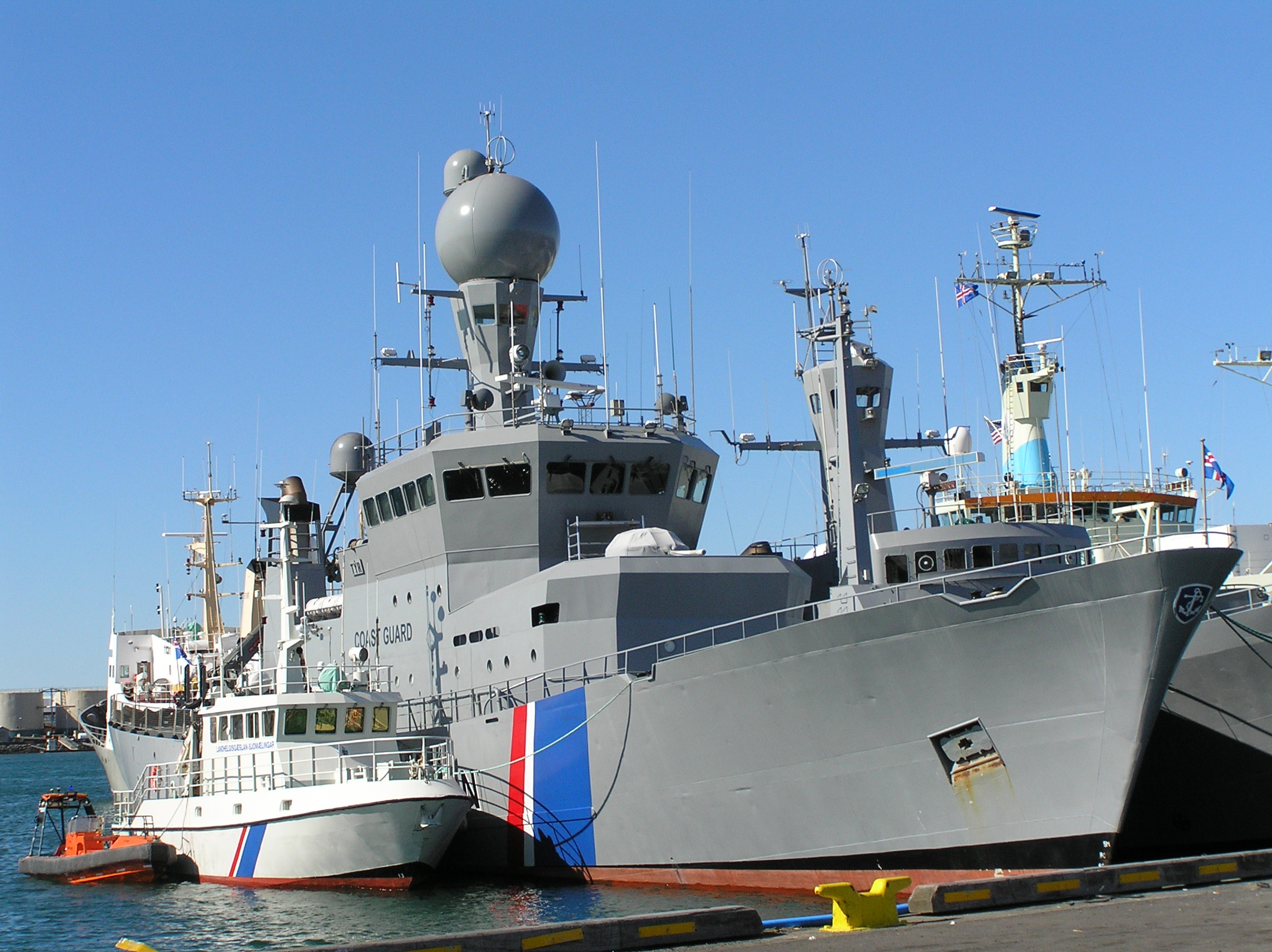
- ICGV Týr

Class overview
- Name: Ægir class
- Builders: Aalborg Shipyard, Denmark; Dannebrog Vaerft, Denmark
- Operators: Icelandic Coast Guard
- In commission: 1968–2021
- Completed: 2
- Retired: 2

General characteristics
- Type: Offshore patrol vessel
- Displacement: 1,146–1,233 t (1,128–1,214 long tons) standard; 1,500 t (1,500 long tons) full load
- Length: 69.8–71.1 m (229 ft 0 in – 233 ft 3 in)
- Beam: 10 m (32 ft 10 in)
- Draught: 4.6 m (15 ft 1 in)
- Propulsion: 2 × MAN 8L 40/54 diesel engines; 2 × shafts, 9,800 kW (13,200 hp)
- Speed: 19–20 knots (35–37 km/h; 22–23 mph)
- Range: 9,000 nmi (17,000 km; 10,000 mi) at 18 knots (33 km/h; 21 mph)
- Complement: 19
- Sensors & processing systems: Sperry surface search radar E/F-band
- Armament: 1 × Bofors 40 mm (1.6 in)/L70 gun
- Aircraft carried: One helicopter (Eurocopter AS332 Super Puma)
- Aviation facilities: Helicopter deck and hangar

The Ægir-class offshore patrol vessel is a class of two offshore patrol vessels serving in the Icelandic Coast Guard (ICG). They participated in the two later Cod Wars. The vessels conduct patrols, search and rescue, fishery inspections, general law enforcement and counter-terrorism operations in the Icelandic exclusive economic zone and the waters of the surrounding territories, such as Greenland and Jan Mayen.

== Design and description ==
The concept for the Ægir-class OPV was based on the Icelandic Coast Guard experiences with ICGV Þór and ICGV Óðinn. Rear Admiral Pétur Sigurðsson, commander of the ICG, set forth a requirement for a ship larger than both Þór and Óðinn and more seaworthy. The vessels were also armoured for icebreaking.

Though of roughly the same design, the two ships are of different measurements. Ægir has a standard displacement of 1,146 tonnes (1,128 long tons) and 1,500 t (1,500 long tons) at full load. The ship measures 69.8 metres (229 ft 0 in) long with a beam of 10 m (32 ft 10 in) and a draught of 4.6 m (15 ft 1 in). Týr has a standard displacement of 1,233 t (1,214 long tons) and the same full load displacement as Ægir.

Týr is 71.1 m (233 ft 3 in) long with the same remaining measurements as Ægir. The two ships are powered by two MAN 8L 40/54 diesel engines turning two shafts with Kamewa controllable pitch propellers rated at 9,800 kilowatts (13,200 hp). This gives the ships a maximum speed of 19 knots (35 km/h; 22 mph) for Ægir and 20 knots (37 km/h; 23 mph) for Týr with a range of 9,000 nautical miles (17,000 km; 10,000 mi) at 18 knots (33 km/h; 21 mph). The vessels have a 20-ton bollard-pulling winch and passive rolling tanks.

The Ægir class was initially armed with a 57 mm (2.2 in) Hotchkiss cannon. However, these weapons were replaced in 1990 with the Bofors 40 mm (1.6 in)/L60 autocannon, which in turn was replaced with the 40 mm Bofors L70 in the late 2000s. Other weapons include net cutters, which the Icelandic Coast Guard used during the Cod Wars.

A large crane is situated forward of the helicopter deck. The ships of the class are equipped with Sperry surface search and navigational radar. Týr is equipped with hull-mounted sonar. The ships sport a helicopter deck aft and a hangar located between the funnels. In 1997, the helicopter deck was extended. The ships have a complement of 19.

== Vessels ==
Ægir class
IMO#	Name	Laid down	Launched	Commissioned	Status
6821585	Ægir		1967	1968	Decommissioned
7358420	Týr		10 October 1974	15 March 1975	Decommissioned

== Construction and career ==
Ægir was the first to be constructed, by Aalborg Shipyard in Denmark and was launched in 1967. Týr was constructed by Dannebrog Værft in Denmark and was launched on 10 October 1974. Ægir entered service with the ICG in 1968 and Týr on 15 March 1975. The ICG uses the vessels to conduct patrols search and rescue, fishery inspections, general law enforcement and counter-terrorism operations in the Icelandic exclusive economic zone.

In 1994, a crane was fitted in both ships forward of the helicopter deck on the starboard side. In 1997, the ships underwent a refit that extended their helicopter decks and installed a radome atop the ship. In 2005, Ægir underwent a refit in Poland that improved the bridge and accommodations along with the installation of in-flight refuelling equipment for the helicopters. Týr received the same modifications in Poland in 2006.
