= Helgi Hallvarðsson =

Icelandic Coast Guard commander

- Born: 12 June 1931; Reykjavík, Kingdom of Iceland
- Died: 15 March 2008 (aged 76); Reykjavík, Iceland
- Military career
- Branch: Icelandic Coast Guard
- Years of service: 1954–1999
- Rank: Commander
- Nickname: The Maddest Axeman
- Commands: ICGV Þór; ICGV Týr; ICGV Ægir
- Conflicts: First Cod War; Second Cod War; Third Cod War

Helgi Hallvarðsson (12 June 1931 – 15 March 2008) was an Icelandic commander in the Icelandic Coast Guard. During his 55-year service with the Coast Guard, he took part in all three Anglo-Icelandic Cod Wars where he was nicknamed "Mad Helgi", "The Maddest Axeman" and "Napoleon of the North" by the British due to his aggressive tactics.

== Life ==
Helgi was born in Reykjavík to Guðfinna Lýðsdóttir and Hallvarður Rósinkarsson, both from Skógarströnd.

== Honours ==
- Norway: Knight of the Order of St. Olav (1974)
- Iceland: Knight of the Order of the Falcon (1976)
