= HMS Falmouth (F113) =

1961 Type 12M or Rothesay-class frigate of the Royal Navy

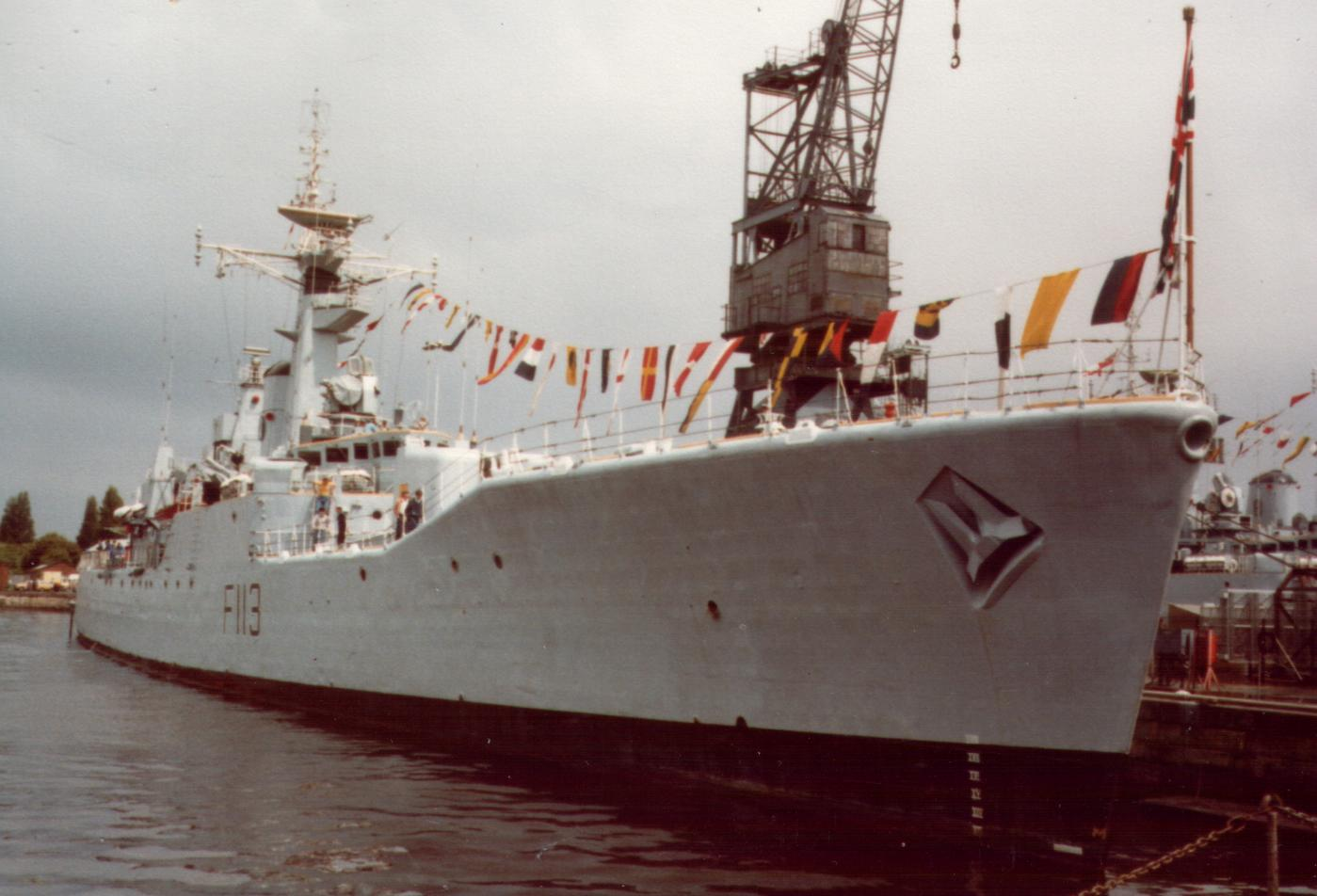
- HMS Falmouth in 1981

History

United Kingdom
- Name: Falmouth
- Namesake: Falmouth
- Builder: Swan Hunter & Wigham Richardson
- Laid down: 23 November 1957
- Launched: 15 December 1959
- Commissioned: 25 July 1961
- Decommissioned: July 1984
- Identification: Pennant number: F113
- Fate: Sold for scrap, 1989

General characteristics (as built)
- Class & type: Rothesay-class frigate
- Displacement: 2,560 long tons full load
- Length: 370 ft
- Beam: 41 ft
- Draught: 17 ft 4 in
- Propulsion: 2 × Babcock & Wilcox boilers English Electric geared turbines, 2 shafts, 30000 shafts horsepower
- Speed: 29 kn (54 km/h; 33 mph)
- Complement: 235
- Armament: 1 × twin 4.5" (114 mm) dual-purpose guns 1 × twin 40 mm on STAAG mounting 2 x Limbo Mortar Mk 10 Mountings 12 × 21-inch (533 mm) torpedo tubes

HMS Falmouth was a Rothesay-class, or "Type 12M (Modified)", anti-submarine frigate built for the Royal Navy during the 1950s. She took part in the Third Cod War in 1976, ramming the Icelandic gunboat V/s Týr. Both ships suffered extensive damage.

== Description ==
Falmouth displaced 2,150 long tons (2,180 t) at normal load and 2,560 long tons (2,600 t) at deep load. The ship had an overall length of 370 feet (112.8 m), a beam of 41 feet (12.5 m) and a draught of 17 feet (5.2 m) at deep load. She was powered by a pair of geared steam turbines, each driving one shaft, which developed a total of 30,000 shaft horsepower (22,000 kW) and gave a maximum speed of 29 knots (54 km/h; 33 mph). Steam for the turbines was provided by a pair of Babcock & Wilcox boilers. Falmouth had a range of 4,500 nautical miles (8,300 km; 5,200 mi) at 12 knots (22 km/h; 14 mph). The ship's complement was 200–35 officers and ratings.

The ship mounted a pair of 4.5-inch (114 mm) Mk 6 guns in a single twin-gun turret forward. Her secondary armament consisted of a twin-gun STAAG mount for the Bofors 40-millimetre (2 in) anti-aircraft gun aft. Falmouth mounted two triple-barrelled mounts for the Limbo anti-submarine mortar. The ship carried eight fixed torpedo tubes and two twin-tube rotating mounts for 21-inch (533 mm) torpedoes. The Rothesay-class ships were equipped with a Type 170 sonar for the Limbo as well as a general-purpose Type 174 sonar. They were fitted with a Type 293Q target-indication radar and a Type 277Q surface-search radar.

== Construction and career ==
Falmouth was laid down on 23 November 1957 by Swan Hunter & Wigham Richardson, launched on 15 December 1959 and was completed on 25 July 1961.

In August 1961 Falmouth joined the 20th Frigate Squadron based at Londonderry Port, Northern Ireland. On 5 December that year, Falmouth collided with the oiler RFA Tideflow in Lyme Bay and was badly damaged. From December 1963, Falmouth served as leader of the 30th Frigate Squadron. The 30th Flotilla, including Falmouth, served as part of the Far East Fleet from September 1964 to December 1964, and again from June 1965 until December that year. Falmouth took part in the Beira Patrol, a naval blockade enforcing an oil embargo against Rhodesia, patrolling off Mombasa in January 1967.

From August 1968 to 6 January 1971, Falmouth was refitted at Portsmouth Dockyard, being fitted with a hangar and flight deck to allow operation of a single Westland Wasp helicopter, while a Seacat launcher was fitted on top of the hangar. One of the Limbo mortars and the Bofors guns were removed in compensation.

On the evening of 6 May 1976, after the outcome of the Third Cod War had already been decided, the Icelandic gunboat V/s Týr was trying to cut the nets of the fishing trawler Carlisle, when Captain Gerald Plumer of Falmouth ordered it rammed. Falmouth rammed the Týr at the speed of 22+ knots (41+ km/h), almost capsizing her. Týr did not sink and managed to cut the nets of Carlisle, after which the Falmouth rammed it again. The Týr was heavily damaged and found herself propelled by only a single screw and pursued by the tug-boat Statesman. As a response Captain Guðmundur Kjærnested gave orders to man Týr's guns to deter any further ramming. Falmouth also sustained serious structural damage on her bow during the incident, and had to enter dry dock at Portsmouth for repairs.

In January 1977, when the United Kingdom enlarged its Exclusive economic zone to 200 nautical miles (370 km), Falmouth was deployed in the North Sea, protecting fishing stocks and oil fields.

Falmouth left active service in 1980, when she was transferred to the Standby Squadron at Chatham, and by early 1982 she was being considered for disposal as a result of the 1981 Defence White Paper, which proposed cuts in the Royal Navy's surface fleet. Argentina's invasion of the Falkland Islands in April 1982 changed these plans, and Falmouth was given a refit and returned to active duty, although she did not take part in the Falklands War. Falmouth carried out a patrol in the South Atlantic from May 1983, returning to Britain in September that year. In March 1984, she was deployed to the Middle and Far East, returning home in August that year.

Falmouth was laid up as a stationary training ship at HMS Sultan in December that year, and was scrapped in Spain from 4 May 1989.

== Bibliography ==
- Colledge, J. J.; Warlow, Ben (2006) [1969]. Ships of the Royal Navy: The Complete Record of All Fighting Ships of the Royal Navy from the 15th Century to the Present (3rd Rev ed.). London: Chatham Publishing. ISBN 978-1-86176-281-8. OCLC 67375475.
- Critchley, Mike (1992). British Warships Since 1945: Part 5: Frigates. Liskeard, UK: Maritime Books. ISBN 0-907771-13-0.
- Friedman, Norman (2006). British Destroyers and Frigates, the Second World War and After (epub ed.). Annapolis, Maryland: Naval Institute Press. ISBN 1-86176-137-6.
- Gardiner, Robert; Chumbley, Stephen & Budzbon, Przemysław (1995). Conway's All the World's Fighting Ships 1947–1995. Annapolis, Maryland: Naval Institute Press. ISBN 1-55750-132-7.
- Marriott, Leo (1983). Royal Navy Frigates 1945–1983. Shepperton, Surrey, UK: Ian Allan Ltd. ISBN 0-7110-1322-5.
- Prézelin, Bernard; Baker, A. D. III, eds. (1990). The Naval Institute Guide to Combat Fleets of the World 1990/1991. Annapolis, Maryland, USA: Naval Institute Press. ISBN 0-87021-250-8.
- Roberts, John (2010). Safeguarding the Nation: The Story of the Modern Royal Navy. Seaforth Publishing. ISBN 978-1848320437.
- Sturtivant, Ray; Ballance, Theo (1994). The Squadrons of the Fleet Air Arm. Tonbridge, Kent, UK: Air Britain (Historians) Ltd. ISBN 0-85130-223-8.
