= ICGV Týr =

Patroler of Iceland

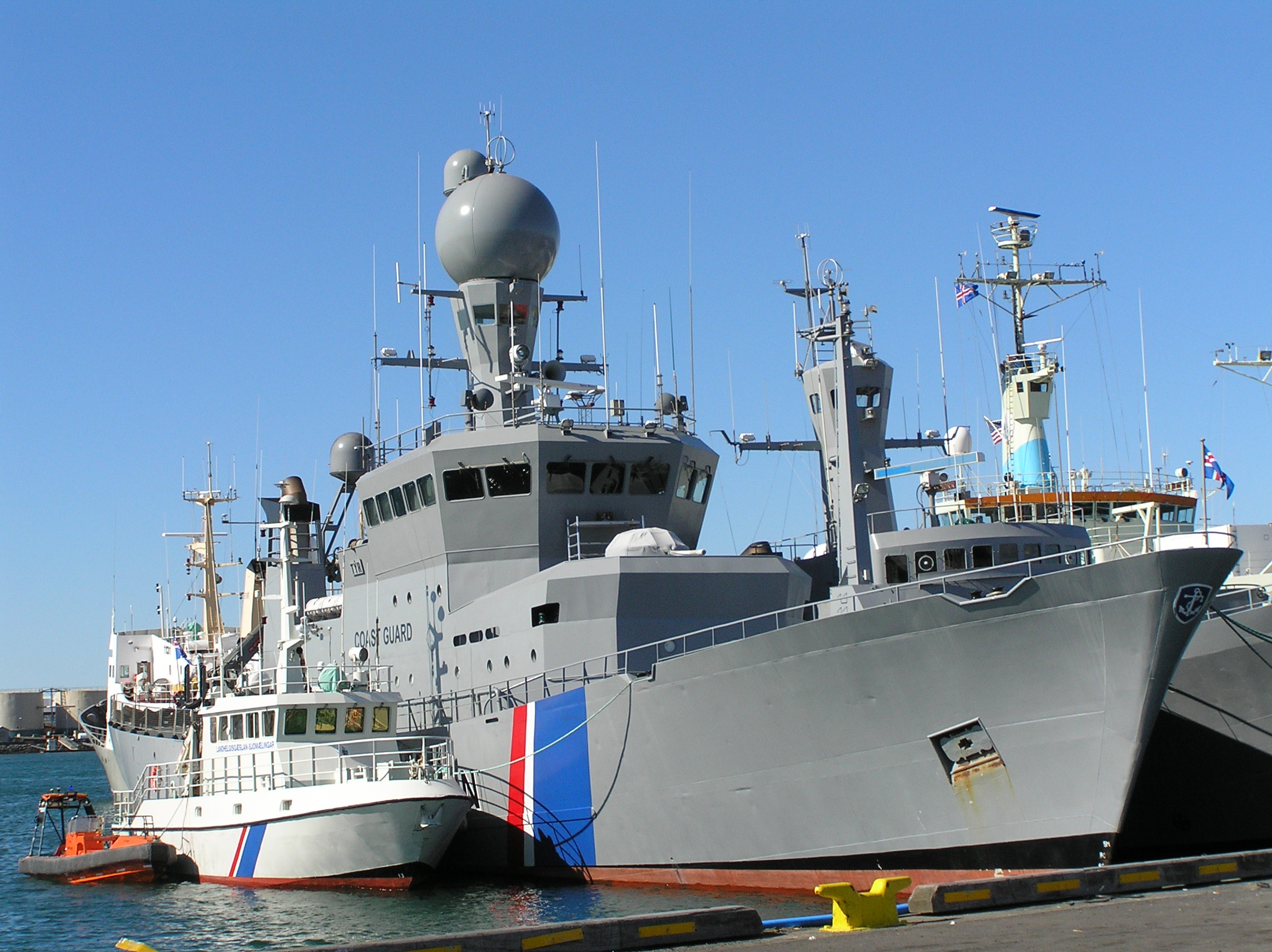
- ICGV Týr in the centre in 2007

History

Iceland
- Name: Týr
- Namesake: Týr
- Builder: Dannebrog Værft, Denmark
- Launched: 10 October 1974
- Commissioned: 15 March 1975
- Decommissioned: 15 November 2021
- Identification: IMO number: 7358420; MMSI number: 251001000; Callsign: TFGA
- Fate: Sold in August 2022

General characteristics
- Class & type: Ægir-class offshore patrol vessel
- Displacement: 1,233 t (1,214 long tons) standard; 1,500 t (1,500 long tons) full load
- Length: 71.1 m (233 ft 3 in)
- Beam: 10 m (32 ft 10 in)
- Draught: 4.6 m (15 ft 1 in)
- Propulsion: 2 × MAN 8L 40/54 diesel engines; 2 × shafts, 9,800 kW (13,200 hp)
- Speed: 20 knots (37 km/h; 23 mph)
- Range: 9,000 nmi (17,000 km; 10,000 mi) at 18 knots (33 km/h; 21 mph)
- Complement: 19
- Sensors & processing systems: Sperry surface search radar E/F-band
- Armament: 1 × Bofors 40 mm (1.6 in)/L70 gun
- Aircraft carried: One helicopter (Eurocopter AS332 Super Puma)
- Aviation facilities: Helicopter deck and hangar

ICGV Týr is an Ægir-class offshore patrol vessel and the former flagship of the Icelandic Coast Guard. The ship was built by Dannebrog Værft in Denmark in 1974–1975 and entered service in 1975. Týr was for a time the second largest ship in the Icelandic Coast Guard and participated in the Third Cod War. The ship conducted patrols, search and rescue, fishery inspections, general law enforcement and counter-terrorism operations in the Icelandic exclusive economic zone and the waters of the surrounding territories, such as Greenland and Jan Mayen. Týr was decommissioned in 2021 and sold in 2022.

== Description ==
Týr has a standard displacement of 1,233 tonnes (1,214 long tons) and 1,500 t (1,500 long tons) at full load. The ship measures 71.1 metres (233 ft 3 in) long with a beam of 10 m (32 ft 10 in) and a draught of 4.6 m (15 ft 1 in). The vessel is powered by two MAN 8L 40/54 diesel engines turning two shafts with Kamewa controllable pitch propellers rated at 9,800 kilowatts (13,200 hp). This gives the ship a maximum speed of 20 knots (37 km/h; 23 mph) with a range of 9,000 nautical miles (17,000 km; 10,000 mi) at 18 knots (33 km/h; 21 mph). The vessels have a 20-ton bollard-pulling winch and passive rolling tanks.

The Ægir class was initially armed with a 57 mm (2.2 in) Hotchkiss cannon. However, these weapons were replaced in 1990 with the Bofors 40 mm (1.6 in)/L60 autocannon, which in turn was replaced with the 40 mm Bofors L70 in the late 2000s. Other weapons include net cutters, which the Icelandic Coast Guard (ICG) used during the Cod Wars. A large crane is situated forward of the helicopter deck. The ships of the class are equipped with Sperry surface search and navigational radar. Týr is equipped with hull-mounted sonar. The ship sports a helicopter deck aft and a hangar located between the funnels. In 1997, the helicopter deck was extended. The ship has a complement of 19.

== Construction and career ==
The patrol vessel was ordered for construction by Dannebrog Værft of Denmark and launched on 10 October 1974. The vessel, named for the deity of Norse mythology, was commissioned in the ICG on 15 March 1975. Týr primarily conducts patrols, search and rescue, fishery inspections, general law enforcement and counter-terrorism operations in the Icelandic exclusive economic zone (EEZ).

=== Cod Wars ===
The Third Cod War began after Iceland extended its EEZ to 200 nautical miles (370 km; 230 mi) in November 1975. ICG vessels were deployed to chase unlicensed fishing trawlers out of the new limit. On 21 November Týr began cutting the nets of British trawlers. ICG had armed all of its trawlers with net cutters. If a fishing trawler refused to leave the area, the ICG ships would come up astern of the fishing trawler at a right angle and using the net cutter, cut the fishing vessel's nets. The loss of the nets and the catch within was an expensive proposition for the fishermen, so they began to work together to prevent the ICG vessels from cutting their nets. Some of the fishing trawlers tried to prevent the ICG from cutting their nets by ramming the ICG ships. The British Royal Navy sent tugboats and frigates to assist the British trawlers in the region. This led to a series of confrontations between the ICG and the Royal Navy.

After a quiet period around Christmas, on 28 December 1975, Týr rammed HMS Andromeda, which was escorting two fishing trawlers at the time. On 6 February 1976 Týr collided with HMS Juno after the British frigate intervened while the Icelandic patrol vessel was attempting to cut the nets of the trawler Ross Altair. On 1 April Týr was involved in seven collisions with HMS Salisbury and HMS Tartar. On 6 May 1976 Týr survived being rammed twice by HMS Falmouth, which led Captain Guðmundur Kjærnested to give the order to man the guns against the much more powerful warship to deter further ramming. The ship received serious damage in the incident. The Third Cod War ended on 1 June after an agreement was reached between Iceland and the United Kingdom.

=== Later career ===
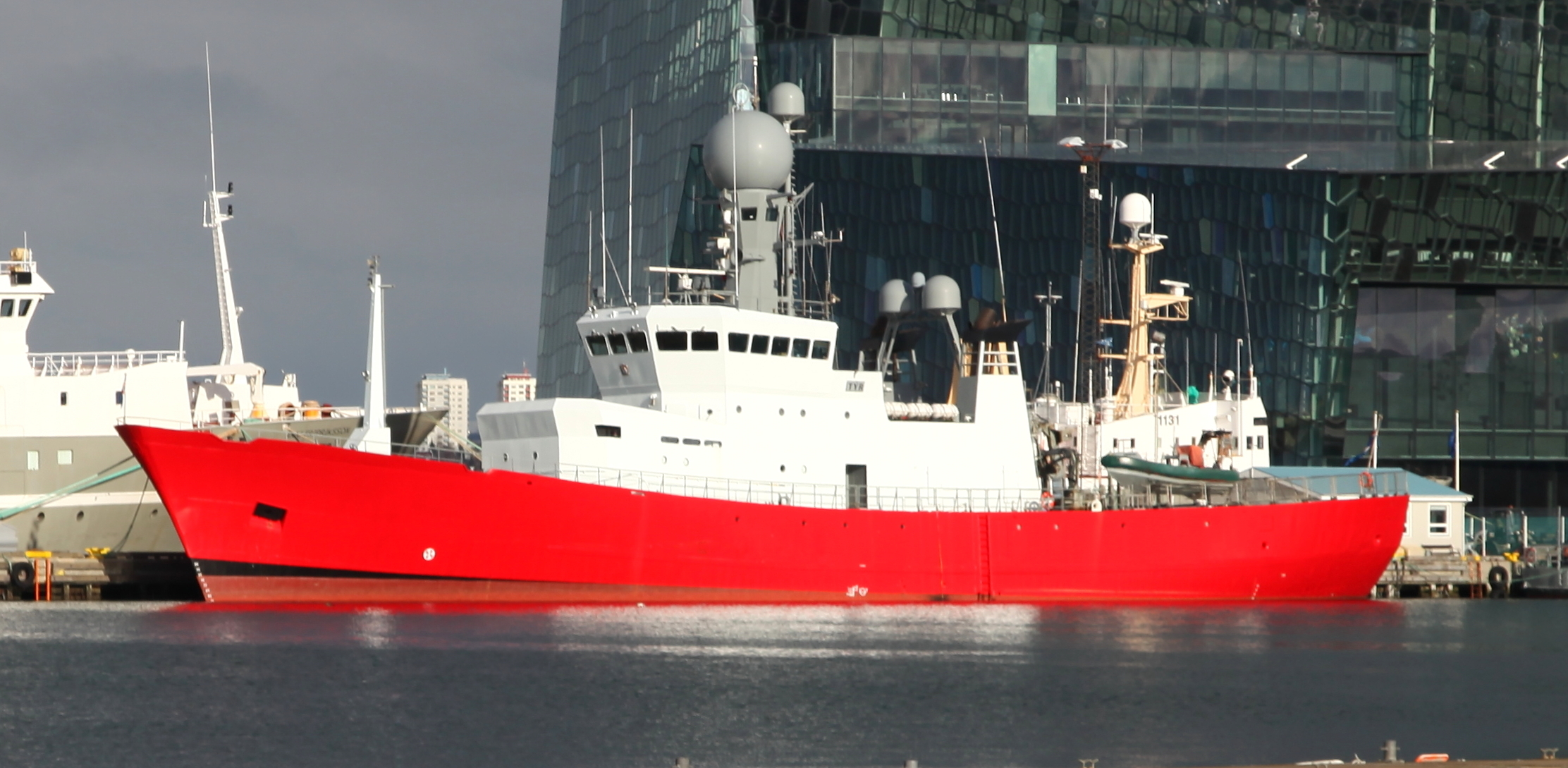
Týr was painted red in 2014 during its lease to Svalbard.

In January 1980, the third engineer on Týr, stabbed and killed two of his crewmates before throwing himself overboard when the ship was located 50 nautical miles (93 km; 58 mi) miles northeast of Grímsey.

In 1994, a crane was fitted in Týr forward of the helicopter deck on the starboard side. In 1997, the ship underwent a refit that extended its helicopter deck and installed a radome atop the ship. In 2006, Týr underwent a refit in Poland that improved the bridge and accommodations along with the installation of in-flight refuelling equipment for the helicopters.

In March 2014, Týr was leased to Fáfnir Offshore hf. for surveillance and rescue work as well as general law enforcement and service work for the Sheriff of Svalbard with home port in Longyearbyen.

The Icelandic Coast Guard fleet takes part in Frontex operations. In December 2014 Týr played a major part in the rescue of 408 migrants 165 nautical miles (306 km; 190 mi) off the coast of Malta in a drifting cargo vessel. of 359 Syrian refugees were rescued in the eastern Mediterranean Sea in January 2015 after they had been abandoned by the crew of the cargo ship Ezadeen off the Italian coast. On 4 April, the crew of Týr rescued 320 people from a boat of the coast of Libya. During the days of 3 and 4 May, the crew rescued 328 people from two small boats north of Libya.

On 11 June 2015, Týr was accidentally rammed and damaged by the Russian sailing ship Kruzenshtern at Reykjavík.

Týr finished its last tour of duty on 15 November 2021 and was put up for a sale. In August 2022, Týr was sold to Fagur ehf, a local shipping company, along with Ægir.

== Notable appearances in media ==
Týr was featured in the 2010 drama film Undercurrent along with the rescue helicopter TF-LÍF.
