= HMS Apollo (F70) =

Type 12I or Leander-class frigate of the Royal Navy and Pakistan Navy

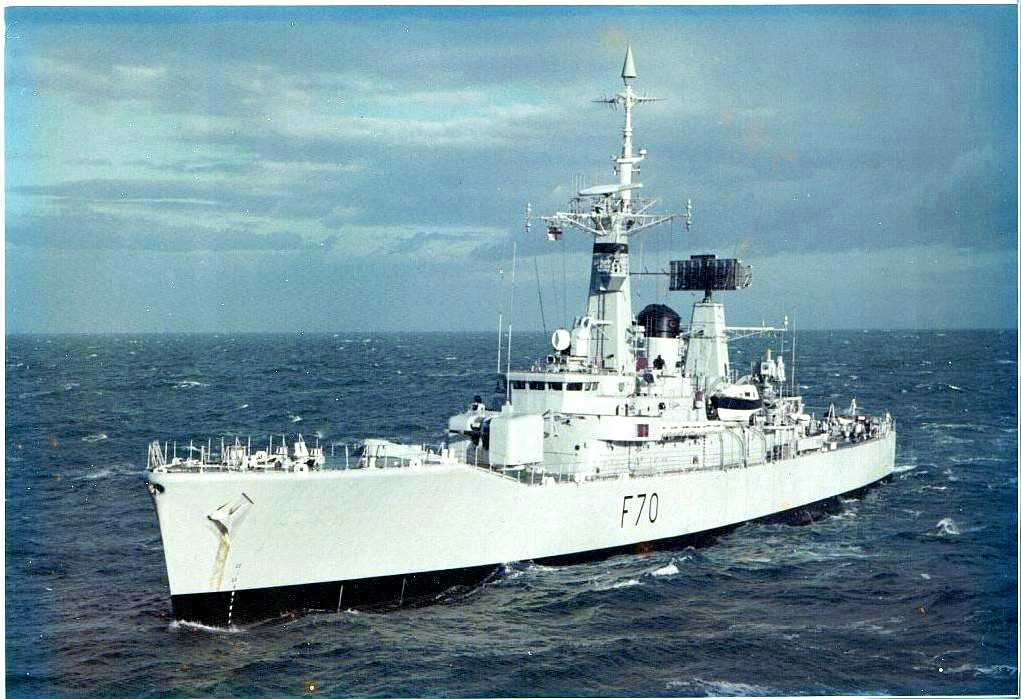

History

United Kingdom
- Name: HMS Apollo
- Builder: Yarrow Shipbuilders
- Laid down: 1 May 1969
- Launched: 15 October 1970
- Commissioned: 28 May 1972
- Decommissioned: 31 August 1988
- Identification: Pennant number: F70
- Fate: Sold to Pakistan, 1988

Pakistan
- Name: PNS Zulfiqar
- Commissioned: 1988
- Decommissioned: 29 October 2006
- Identification: Pennant number: F262
- Fate: Sunk as target, 12 March 2010

General characteristics
- Class & type: Leander-class frigate
- Displacement: 3,200 long tons (3,251 t) full load
- Length: 113.4 m (372 ft)
- Beam: 12.5 m (41 ft)
- Draught: 5.8 m (19 ft)
- Propulsion: 2 × Babcock & Wilcox boilers supplying steam to two sets of White-English Electric double-reduction geared turbines to two shafts
- Speed: 28 knots (52 km/h)
- Range: 4,600 nautical miles (8,500 km) at 15 knots (28 km/h)
- Complement: 223
- Armament: 1 × twin 4.5 inch (114 mm) guns; 1 × quadruple Sea Cat anti-aircraft missile launchers; 1 × Limbo anti-submarine mortar
- Aircraft carried: 1 × Westland Wasp helicopter

HMS Apollo was a batch 3B broadbeam Leander-class frigate of the Royal Navy. She was, like the rest of the class, named after a figure of mythology. Apollo was built by Yarrow Shipbuilders of Scotstoun. She was launched on 15 October 1970 and commissioned on 28 May 1972, making her the penultimate Leander.

Both Apollo and Ariadne are easily distinguished from the other Leanders by their 'witches hat' – fitted to the top of the foremast as a part of the electronic warfare array.

== Construction ==
Apollo was one of two Leander-class frigates ordered on 29 July 1968 for the Royal Navy under the 1967–68 construction programme, the other being Ariadne and were the last two Leanders built for the Royal Navy. She was laid down at Yarrow Shipbuilders' Scotstoun, Glasgow shipyard on 1 May 1969 as Yard number 1002. She was launched on 15 October 1970 and commissioned on 10 June 1972 with the Pennant number F70.

Apollo was a Batch 3, "Broad-Beamed" Leander, and as such was 372 feet (113.4 m) long overall and 360 feet (109.7 m) at the waterline, with a beam of 43 feet (13.1 m) and a maximum draught of 19 feet (5.8 m). Displacement was 2,500 long tons (2,500 t) standard and 2,962 long tons (3,010 t) full load. Two oil-fired boilers fed steam at 550 pounds per square inch (3,800 kPa) and 850 °F (454 °C) to a pair of double reduction geared steam turbines that in turn drove two propeller shafts, with the machinery rated at 30,000 shaft horsepower (22,000 kW), giving a speed of 28 knots (52 km/h; 32 mph).

A twin 4.5-inch (113 mm) Mark 6 gun mount was fitted forward. A single Sea Cat surface-to-air missile launcher was fitted aft (on the Helicopter hangar roof), while two Oerlikon 20mm cannon provided close-in defence. A Limbo anti-submarine mortar was fitted aft to provide a short-range anti-submarine capability, while a hangar and helicopter deck allowed a single Westland Wasp helicopter to be operated, for longer range anti-submarine and anti-surface operations.

Apollo was fitted with a large Type 965 long range air search radar on the ship's mainmast, with a Type 993 short range air/surface target indicating radar and Type 978 navigation radar carried on the ship's foremast. An MRS3 fire control system was carried to direct the 4.5-inch guns. The ship had a sonar suite of Type 184 medium range search sonar, Type 162 bottom search and Type 170 attack sonar.

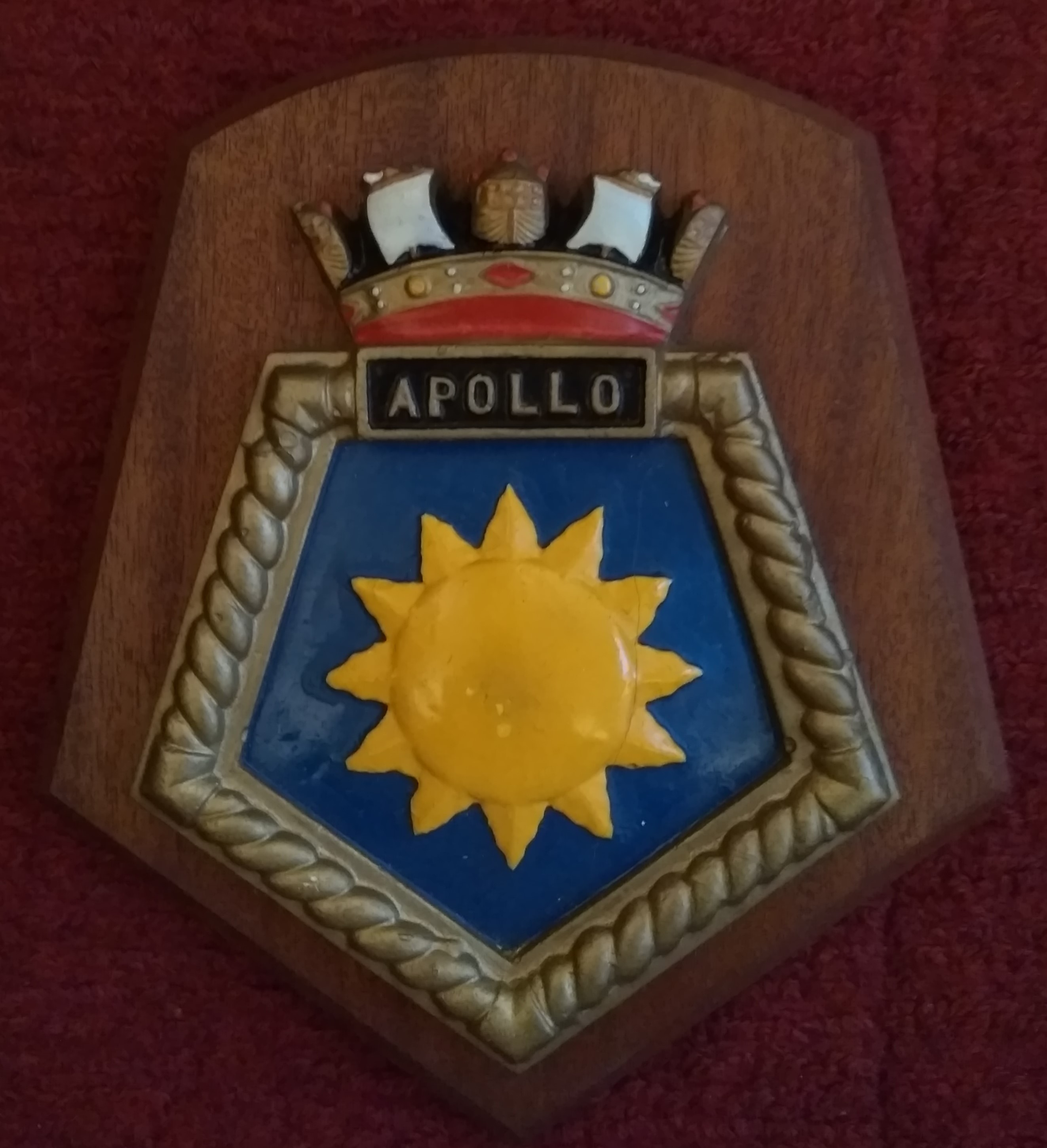
Ship's plaque presented to visitors.

== Royal Navy service ==
Apollo saw her first action during the Second Cod War in 1973, during the fishing disputes with Iceland, when Apollo, while on a fishery protection patrol, was in collision with the Icelandic gunboat ICGV Ægir on 29 August 1973. One Icelandic engineer died later while welding a plate on Ægir's damaged hull, the only recorded fatality of the Cod Wars.

In January 1977 the UK extended its territorial waters from 12 miles to 200 miles to create an exclusive economic zone for fishery rights. Apollo took turns with other frigates to police the North Sea pending the introduction into service of the Island-class fishery protection vessels.

In 1977, Apollo took part in the last Fleet Review of the Royal Navy so far, in celebration of Queen Elizabeth II's Silver Jubilee. As captain of the Second Frigate Squadron, Apollo was responsible for anchorages of all warships at the Royal Fleet Review. In recognition of this work, the admiralty awarded the ship four rather than two 1977 QEII Silver Jubilee Medals. Apollo was positioned between HMS Hardy and HMS Salisbury.

Apollo was intended to be modernised, (probably involving removal of her one 4.5-inch twin gun, which would have been replaced by the Exocet anti-ship missile and Sea Wolf anti-aircraft missiles, but possibly also involving fitting of a towed array sonar), but the modernisation was cancelled due to the 1981 Defence Review by the minister, John Nott. In June 1982, Apollo was sent to patrol the South Atlantic in the aftermath of the Falklands War, encountering heavy seas that damaged her hull. She returned home in October. In late 1983 Apollo once again returned to the South Atlantic.

Apollo was refitted at Devonport between 30 July 1984 and 17 May 1985 at a cost of £11,000,000, recommissioning on 28 June that year. The ship's armament was unchanged, but Type 1006 navigation radar was fitted and the ship's davits and motor boat replaced by a light pole-derrick to handle lighter inflatable boats.

== Sale to Pakistan ==
In 1988, Apollo's Royal Navy career came to an end when she was decommissioned on 7 July and sold to Pakistan on 15 July. The ship was renamed PNS Zulfiqar, and commissioning in the Pakistan Navy on 14 October 1988. From 1991 to 1993 she underwent a major refit and her 20 mm guns and Seacat system were replaced by twin 25 mm mounts, and her Westland Wasp was replaced by an SA 319B Alouette III helicopter. Zulfiqar continued in service for 18 years with the Pakistan Navy until 29 October 2006 when she was decommissioned into training.

== Fate ==
On 12 March 2010, Zulfiqar was sunk as a target in the Arabian Sea. Torpedoes and missiles were fired from an F-22P frigate, P3C aircraft and an Agosta 90B submarine.

== Publications ==
- Blackman, Raymond V. B., ed. (1971). Jane's Fighting Ships 1971–72. London: Sampson Low Marston & Co., Ltd. ISBN 0-354-00096-9.
- Burden, Rodney A.; Draper, Michael I.; Rough, Douglas A.; Smith, Colin R.; Wilton, David (1986). Falklands: The Air War. British Aviation Research Group. ISBN 0-906339-05-7.
- Colledge, J. J.; Warlow, Ben (2006) [1969]. Ships of the Royal Navy: The Complete Record of All Fighting Ships of the Royal Navy from the 15th Century to the Present (3rd Rev ed.). London: Chatham Publishing. ISBN 978-1-86176-281-8. OCLC 67375475.
- Critchley, Mike (1986). British Warships Since 1945: Part 5 Frigates. Liskeard, UK: Maritime Books. ISBN 0-907771-13-0.
- Friedman, Norman (2008). British Destroyers & Frigates: The Second World War and After. Barnsley, UK: Seaforth Publishing. ISBN 978-1-84832-015-4.
- Marriott, Leo (1983). Royal Navy Frigates 1945-1983. Shepperton, Surrey, UK: Ian Allan. ISBN 0-7110-1322-5.
- Osborne, Richard; Sowdon, David (1990). Leander Class Frigates. Kendal, UK: World Ships Society. ISBN 0-905617-56-8.
- Prézelin, Bernard; Baker, A. D., eds. (1990). The Naval Institute Guide to Combat Fleets of the World 1990/1991. Annapolis, Maryland, USA: Naval Institute Press. ISBN 0-87021-250-8.
