= ICGV Ægir =

Ship built in 1968

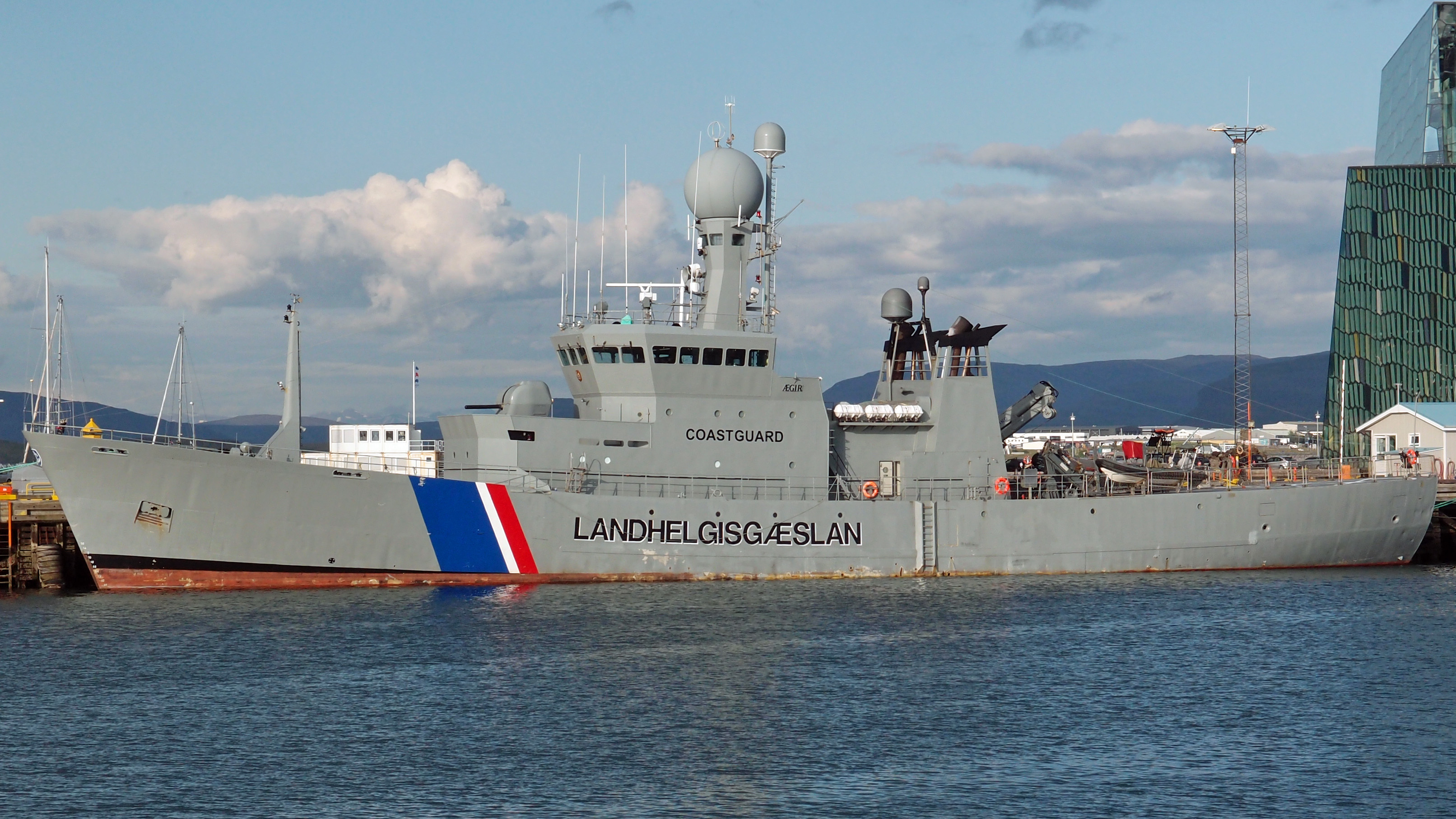
- Ægir

History

Iceland
- Name: Ægir
- Builder: Aalborg Værft, Denmark
- Laid down: May 1967
- Launched: 1967
- Commissioned: 1968
- Decommissioned: 2020
- Stricken: 2022
- Identification: IMO number: 6821585; MMSI number: 251002000; Callsign: TFTA
- Status: Sold in August 2022.

General characteristics
- Class & type: Ægir-class offshore patrol vessel
- Displacement: 1,146 t (1,128 long tons) standard; 1,500 t (1,500 long tons) full load
- Length: 69.8 m (229 ft 0 in)
- Beam: 10 m (32 ft 10 in)
- Draught: 4.6 m (15 ft 1 in)
- Propulsion: 2 × MAN 8L 40/54 diesel engines; 2 × shafts, 9,800 kW (13,200 hp)
- Speed: 19 knots (35 km/h; 22 mph)
- Range: 9,000 nmi (17,000 km; 10,000 mi) at 18 knots (33 km/h; 21 mph)
- Complement: 19
- Sensors & processing systems: Sperry surface search radar E/F-band
- Armament: 1 × Bofors 40 mm (1.6 in)/L70 gun
- Aircraft carried: One helicopter (Eurocopter AS332 Super Puma)
- Aviation facilities: Helicopter deck and hangar

ICGV Ægir is a former offshore patrol vessel of the Icelandic Coast Guard. Built by Aalborg Værft, in Denmark, she is the lead ship of the Ægir class and has one sister ship of an improved design, ICGV Týr. The ship entered service in 1968 and participated in the two last Cod Wars against the United Kingdom. Ægir primarily conducted patrols, search and rescue, fishery inspections, general law enforcement and counter-terrorism operations in the Icelandic exclusive economic zone. In 2020, the patrol vessel was taken out of service and sold two years later.

== Description ==
Ægir has a standard displacement of 1,146 tonnes (1,128 long tons) and 1,500 t (1,500 long tons) at full load. The ship measures 69.8 metres (229 ft 0 in) long with a beam of 10 m (32 ft 10 in) and a draught of 4.6 m (15 ft 1 in). The ship is powered by two MAN 8L 40/54 diesel engines turning two shafts with Kamewa controllable pitch propellers rated at 9,800 kilowatts (13,200 hp). This gives the ship a maximum speed of 19 knots (35 km/h; 22 mph) with a range of 9,000 nautical miles (17,000 km; 10,000 mi) at 18 knots (33 km/h; 21 mph). The vessel has a 20-ton bollard-pulling winch and passive rolling tanks.

The Ægir-class ships were initially armed with a 57 mm (2.2 in) Hotchkiss cannon. However, these weapons were replaced in 1990 with the Bofors 40 mm (1.6 in)/L60 autocannon, which in turn was replaced with the 40 mm Bofors L70 in the late 2000s. Among other weapons equipped include net cutters, which the Icelandic Coast Guard used during the Cod Wars. A large crane is situated forward of the helicopter deck. Ægir mounts Sperry surface search and navigational radar. The vessel sports a helicopter deck aft and a hangar located between the funnels. In 1997, the helicopter deck was extended. The ship has a complement of 19.

== Construction and career ==
The order of a new vessel to be constructed for the Icelandic Coast Guard (ICG) was projected in February 1965. The keel for the ship was laid down in May 1967 by Aalborg Værft in Denmark and the ship was launched that same year. Named for a character in Norse mythology, the ship was completed in 1968 and entered service with the ICG the same year. Ægir primarily conducts patrols, search and rescue, fishery inspections, general law enforcement and counter-terrorism operations in the Icelandic exclusive economic zone (EEZ).

=== Cod Wars ===
Ægir took part in the Second Cod War from 1 September 1972 to 8 November 1973. The Cod Wars began after Iceland extended its EEZ from 4 nautical miles (7.4 km; 4.6 mi) from the coast to 12 nautical miles (22 km; 14 mi) and disallowed other nations to fish within those limits. Traditionally other European nations, including the United Kingdom and West Germany fished in the area for cod. In the late 1950s, Icelandic Coast Guard ships attempted to drive off fishing trawlers which led escalation and the intervention of the British Royal Navy. In 1961, the two sides made peace and allowed British ships in Icelandic waters at certain times of the year. Before this could be completely settled in international courts, a second confrontation began.

Iceland expanded its EEZ again, this time to 50 nautical miles (93 km; 58 mi). ICG vessels were deployed to chase unlicensed fishing trawlers out of the new limit. On 2 September 1972, Ægir chased 16 trawlers out of the EEZ. This led to the Royal Navy creating a special patrol that would stay just outside of the new limit. While awaiting the court's decision, the ICG had armed all of its trawlers with net cutters. If a fishing trawler refused to leave the area, the ICG ships would come up astern of the fishing trawler at a right angle and using the net cutter, cut the fishing vessel's nets. The loss of the nets and the catch within was an expensive proposition for the fishermen, so they began to work together to prevent the ICG vessels from cutting their nets. Some of the fishing trawlers tried to prevent the ICG from cutting their nets by ramming the ICG ships. On 12 September Ægir cut the nets of the fishing trawlers Lucinda and Wyre Victory.

On 23 January 1973 the volcano Eldfell on the island of Heimaey erupted and the ICG ships were withdrawn to aid in the rescue of the island's citizens. They returned on 5 May. In the meantime, the British had chartered two tugboats to help defend the fishing trawlers within Iceland's EEZ. In March Ægir fired upon the trawlers Brucella and St Leger in separate incidents. (Note: Kurlansky claims that one of the ships was one of the tugboats chartered to help defend the trawlers) By 17 May, the ICG vessels had fired upon the trawlers 12 more times, which led them to demand Royal Navy assistance. The Royal Navy entered the area and the trawlers began to fish in boxes of four.

On the morning of 26 May, Ægir, captained by Guðmundur Kjærnested, caught the trawler Everton, captained by George Mussell, fishing within the 50-nautical mile zone and demanded that it stopped to be boarded. Captain Mussell rejected the Coast Guards demands and steamed away. Ægir pursued and fired several warning shots, first blanks and then solid shots across Everton's bow. When that had no effect, Ægir fired a total of eight shots into Everton's hull. Despite the violent act, the communication between the two captains remained cordial during the shooting with Guðmundur stating his intentions ahead of the shootings and asking Mussell to move his crew to the back of the ship. After each shot, Ægir waited until the engineer of Everton inspected the damage, which Mussell then reported to the Coast Guard ship, before commencing shooting. One of the shots hit Everton just above waterline and as it speed away it took on water and started to list. As it neared other British trawlers, Ægir ceased its pursuit. The trawler was repaired by crewmen from the tug Statesman and HMS Jupiter, despite recommendations to otherwise, went back to fishing the day after. In 2004, declassified documents showed that the incident nearly caused an escalation of the dispute as Captain Jock Slater of Jupiter had requested permission from London to fire at Ægir if it was still attempting to seize Everton upon its arrival. By the evening of the day, officials in London seriously discussed ordering Ægir to be seized by any means necessary but did not follow through due to the repercussions those actions could bring, mainly the potential loss of life, as the Coast Guard crew was unlikely to give the ship up without a fight, and the likelihood of Iceland abandoning NATO as a response.

With the arrival of the Royal Navy, the ICG vessels began interactions with the frigates and Ægir had three separate significant collisions with British frigates; on 1 June with HMS Scylla on 17 July with HMS Lincoln and on 29 August with HMS Apollo. Following the final collision, the 2nd engineer on Týr, Halldór Hallfreðsson, died in an accident while working on repairs, becoming the only fatality of the Cod Wars. He had been electric welding holes on the port side of the ship when a wave swept over the ship as it tried to evade the tug Statesman.

On 3 October, Ægir collided with the frigate Lincoln again, this time recorded by a television crew. The Icelandic government threatened to break off diplomatic ties with the United Kingdom, which led to the withdrawal of Royal Navy vessels from the area on 3 October. The de-escalation led to a treaty that allowed access to the area for British fishermen, but only in smaller trawlers.

The Third Cod War began after Iceland extended its EEZ to 200 nautical miles (370 km; 230 mi) in November 1975. ICG vessels began net cutting operations again, with Ægir cutting the nets of Wilber Wilberforce on 25 November and Boston Comanche on 3 December. On 3 January, even with a Royal Navy presence in the area, Ægir managed to cut the nets of two trawlers. The Third Cod War became the most hazardous as the Royal Navy moved to prevent the ICG vessels from cutting nets or arresting trawlers, such as the case of Ægir and the fishing vessel Primella. There were 50 collisions, with the last being Ægir with the frigate HMS Tartar on 26 May. The ICG vessels managed to cut 41 nets. The Third Cod War ended on 31 May.

=== Modernisation ===
In 1994, a crane was fitted in Ægir forward of the helicopter deck on the starboard side. In 1997, the ship underwent a refit that extended its helicopter deck and installed a radome atop the ship. In 2005, Ægir underwent a refit in Poland that improved the bridge and accommodations along with the installation of in-flight refuelling equipment for the helicopters.

=== End of service ===
On 1 November 2020, the Icelandic Central Public Procurement agency Ríkiskaup announced that Ægir will be auctioned because of its age and prolonged inactivity in the recent years. Ríkiskaup opened an online platform that allowed people to submit suggestions about the future of the vessel and the deadline was set for 6 January 2021. In August 2022, Ægir, along with Týr, was sold to Fagur ehf..
