= ICGV Þór (1951) =

Ship

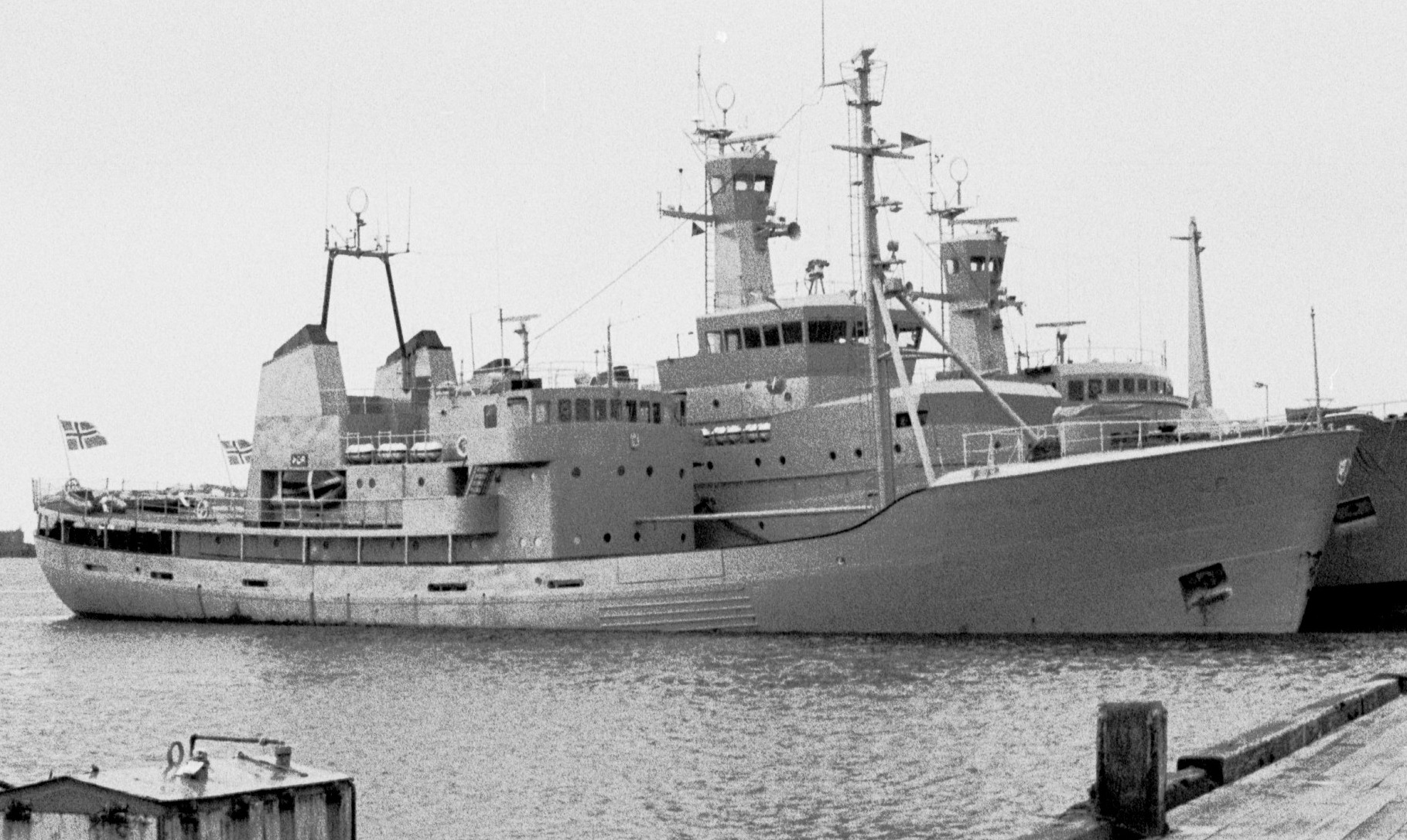
- Þór in Reykjavík harbour in 1983

History

Iceland
- Name: Þór
- Namesake: Thor
- Ordered: 8 November 1948
- Commissioned: 1951
- Decommissioned: 1983
- Out of service: 1985
- Identification: IMO number: 5359743
- Fate: Sold in 1985, scrapped 2012

General characteristics
- Type: Offshore patrol vessel
- Displacement: 960 t
- Length: 62.8 m (206 ft)
- Beam: 9.5 m (31 ft)
- Height: 5.2 m (17 ft)
- Speed: 18 knots (33 km/h; 21 mph)
- Complement: 27

ICGV Þór was an offshore patrol vessel of the Icelandic Coast Guard. The third coast guard ship to bear the name, she was the flagship of the fleet and served in all three Cod Wars conflicts between Iceland and the United Kingdom.

== History ==
Þór was ordered on 8 November 1948. It was built in Ålborg, Denmark and arrived in Iceland on 20 October 1951. It was originally armed with two 47 mm and one 57 mm guns.

=== Cod Wars ===
In the First Cod War, which started on 1 September 1958, Icelandic fisheries protection vessels made numerous attempts to stop British trawlers from fishing in contested waters, attempting to arrest the trawlers or cut their nets. On 29 September that year, Þór fired warning shots when trying to arrest trawlers, while on 30 April 1959, Þór fired on the trawler Arctic Viking, first firing warning shots and then at the trawler's masts to disable Arctic Viking's radio. The British destroyer Contest, which was on patrol in the area, fired three star shells, after which, Þór turned away and abandoned its attempts to arrest the trawler. On 29 February 1960, Þór fired warning shots at the trawler Camilla.

On 11 December 1975, Þór, under the command of Helgi Hallvarðsson, was leaving port at Seyðisfjörður, where it had been minesweeping, when orders were received to investigate the presence of unidentified foreign vessels at the mouth of the fjord. The vessels were identified as three British ships: Lloydsman, an oceangoing tug three times bigger than V/s Þór; Star Aquarius, an oil rig supply vessel of British Ministry of Agriculture, Fisheries and Food; and her sister ship, Star Polaris. They were sheltering from a force nine gale within Iceland's 12-nautical-mile (22 km) territorial waters. In the Icelandic account, when ordered to leave Icelandic territorial waters by the commander of Þór, the three tugboats initially complied. However, around two nautical miles (3.7 km; 2.3 mi) from the coast, Star Aquarius allegedly veered to starboard and hit Þór's port side as the Coast Guards attempted to overtake her. Even as Þór increased speed, Lloydsman again collided with its port side. Þór had suffered considerable damage by these hits and so when Star Aquarius came about, a blank round was fired from Þór. That did not deter Star Aquarius, as it hit Þór a second time. Another shot was fired from Þór as a result, this time a live round that hit the bow of Star Aquarius. Then, the tugboats retreated. V/s Þór, which was close to sinking after the confrontation, sailed to Loðmundarfjörður for temporary repairs.

On 6 January 1976, the ship was damaged after a collision with the British frigate HMS Andromeda, and was further damaged after a second collision with the frigate HMS Leander on 9 January, with Þór needing repairs.

=== Later career ===
In 1985, the ship was sold to the Icelandic Association for Search and Rescue and commissioned as Sæbjörg where it served as a training vessel until 1998. It was sold for scrap in 2012.

== In film ==
Þór served as the main setting in the 2009 film Reykjavik Whale Watching Massacre.
