= ICGV Óðinn =

Former ship of the Icelandic Coast Guard

Coordinates: 64.153250°N 21.947204°W

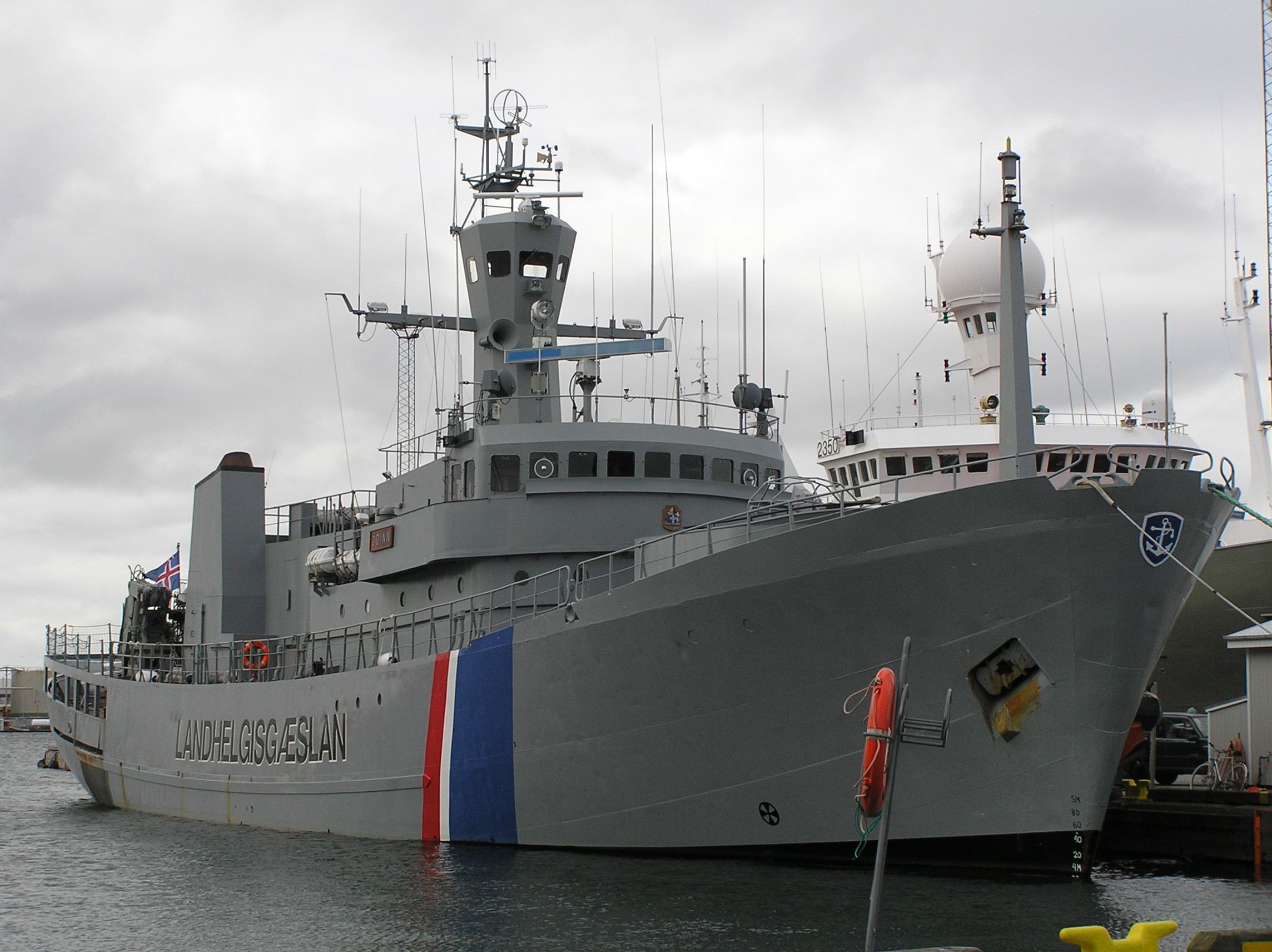
- ICGV Óðinn in 2006

History

Iceland
- Name: Óðinn
- Launched: September 1959
- Commissioned: January 1960
- Decommissioned: 2006
- In service: May 2022
- Identification: IMO number: 5261037
- Status: Museum ship

General characteristics
- Type: Offshore patrol vessel
- Displacement: 925 tonnes (910 long tons)
- Length: 63.68 m (208 ft 11 in)
- Beam: 10 m (33 ft)
- Draught: 5.5 m (18 ft)
- Propulsion: B&W V.B.F 62 × 2; 2096 kW
- Speed: 33 km/h (18 kn)
- Complement: 19
- Sensors & processing systems: Surface Search: Sperry; E/F-band; Navigation: Furuno; I-band
- Armament: 40 mm Bofors L60 MKIII; (57 mm Hotchkiss until 1989)
- Aircraft carried: One helicopter

ICGV Óðinn is a decommissioned offshore patrol vessel formerly operated by the Icelandic Coast Guard. She is the oldest ship in the coastguard's fleet, and it is believed that her Burmeister & Wain engines are the only such engines that are still serviceable in the world today. Since her withdrawal from active duty, she has served as a museum ship at the Reykjavík Maritime Museum in Reykjavík Harbour. The ship is still maintained, and operative as of June 2022.

== Service ==
On 10 July 1960, Óðinn fired on the British trawler Grimsby Town, which was claimed to be fishing within Iceland's 12 mile territorial waters, with two shots hitting Grimsby Town's funnel. The Royal Navy frigate Palliser came up and prevented Óðinn from arresting Grimsby Town. On 27 April 1963, Óðinn caught the Aberdeen trawler Milwood and after a chase, took the trawler into Reykjavík. Milwood was eventually released in August that year after the trawler's owners paid a bond of £10,000. On 23 October 1963, Óðinn went to the aid of the British trawler Northern Spray, which had run aground off the coast of Iceland, and with the trawler James Barrie, rescued Northern Spray's crew and attempted unsuccessfully to refloat the stranded trawler. On 23 January, 1966 she pulled off the British trawler "Wyre Conqueror" that had grounded at Mýrdalssandur in a snowstorm on 18 January.

=== The Cod Wars ===
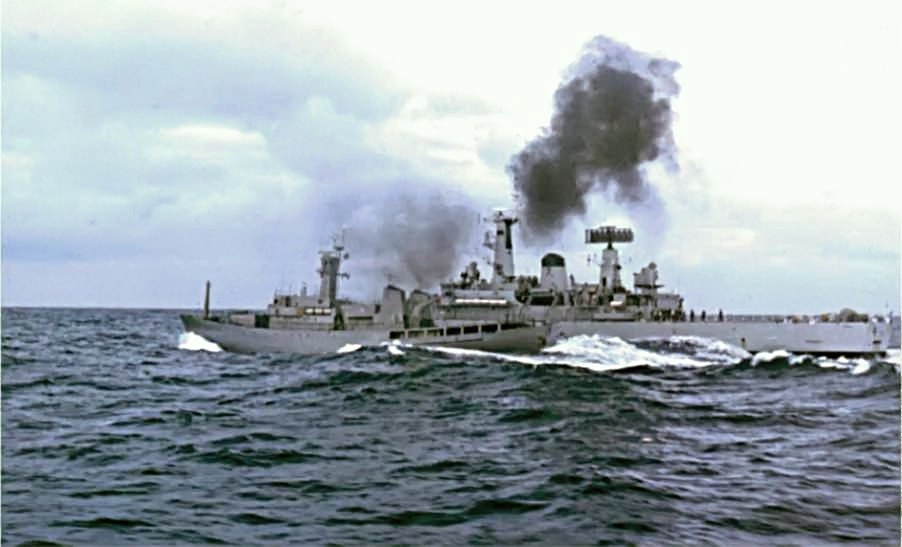
HMS Scylla and Óðinn colliding during the Second Cod War

On 16 April, 1976 she cut both trawl warps of British trawler "Boston Kestrel", and again on 3 May, 1976.

On 30 April 1976, during the cod wars, she rammed the British sidewinder trawler Arctic Corsair, after Óðinn had made three attempts to cut the trawl warps. (In 2017, with both vessels museum ships, their bells were exchanged as a gesture of cooperation). On 11 July, 1976 she cut one trawl warp of British trawler "Boston Explorer".

=== Museum ship ===
The ship was donated to the Hollvinasamtök Óðins in 2008 and it was put on display at the Reykjavík Maritime Museum. In 2014, work on restoring the ship to operational status began and in 2020, the ship sailed from Reykjavík harbour for the first time in more than a decade during an engine test. In May 2022, Óðinn received an official certificate of seaworthiness from the Icelandic Transport Authority. On 11 June 2022, Óðinn sailed with Guðni Th. Jóhannesson, the President of Iceland, and Suzuki Ryotaro, the Japanese ambassador to Iceland, from Reykjavík to Grindavík for the official celebration of the Icelandic Fishermen's day.

== In film ==
ICGV Óðinn, along with ICGV Týr, was used as scenery in the film Flags of Our Fathers, when it was filmed in Iceland the summer of 2005. Its crew rescued one of the landing boats used in the film, as it was about to be thrown into a cliff.

== Previous Óðinns ==
- The first ICGV Óðinn was the second Icelandic Coast Guard vessel that was commissioned and the first purposely built as a patrol ship. She was built in Denmark in 1925 and arrived in Iceland on 23 June 1926. A steel ship with a displacement of 512 tonnes, she was armed with two 57 mm cannon. As a result of severe financial mismanagement of the Icelandic Government she was sold cheaply to Sweden in 1936.
- The second ICGV Óðinn was built at Akureyri in 1938. She was only 85 tonnes and made of oak. When the current Óðinn was commissioned she was renamed Gautur, which is one of Óðinn's pseudonyms. She was decommissioned in 1964.
