= Guðmundur Kjærnested =

- Born: 29 June 1923; Hafnarfjörður, Iceland
- Died: 2 September 2005 (aged 82); Reykjavík, Iceland
- Military career
- Branch: Icelandic Coast Guard
- Years of service: 1940–1984
- Rank: Commander
- Commands: ICGV Týr; ICGV Ægir
- Conflicts: First Cod War; Second Cod War; Third Cod War

Guðmundur Hjaltason Halldórsson Kjærnested (29 June 1923 – 2 September 2005) was an Icelandic commander in the Icelandic Coast Guard and took part in all three Anglo-Icelandic Cod Wars.

== Life ==
Born in Hafnarfjörður, he is most famous for being the commander of ICGV Týr and for his achievements while protecting disputed changes to Icelandic territorial waters from the Royal Navy and British trawlers during the Cod Wars. Guðmundur died on 2 September 2005. He is regarded as a national hero in Iceland.

== Honours ==
- Iceland: Knight of the Order of the Falcon (17 June 1976)
- Iceland: Grand Knight (Commander) of the Order of the Falcon (17 June 1984)
- Denmark: Knight of the Order of the Dannebrog
- Norway: Knight of the Order of St. Olav
