= HMS Scylla (F71) =

22nd Leander-class frigate of the Royal Navy

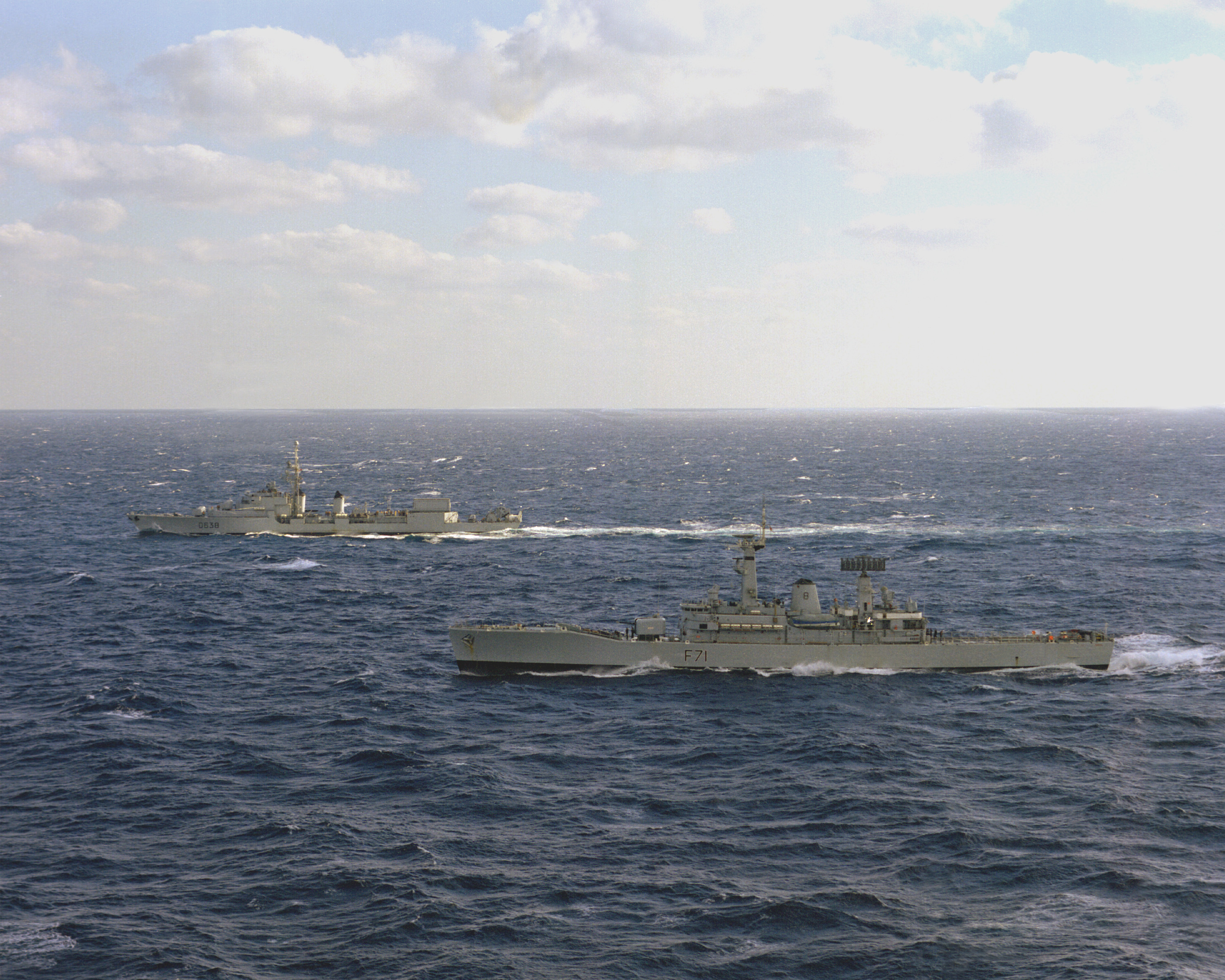
- Scylla (right) and the French destroyer La Galissonniere (left) underway during NATO exercises on 18 November 1978

History

United Kingdom
- Name: HMS Scylla
- Builder: Devonport Royal Dockyard
- Laid down: 17 May 1967
- Launched: 8 August 1968
- Commissioned: 12 February 1970
- Decommissioned: December 1993
- Identification: Pennant number: F71
- Fate: Sunk as an artificial reef on 27 March 2004

General characteristics
- Class & type: Leander-class frigate
- Displacement: 3,200 long tons (3,251 t) full load
- Length: 113.4 m (372 ft)
- Beam: 12.5 m (41 ft)
- Draught: 5.8 m (19 ft)
- Propulsion: 2 × Babcock & Wilcox boilers supplying steam to two sets of White-English Electric double-reduction geared turbines to two shafts
- Speed: 28 knots (52 km/h)
- Range: 4,600 nautical miles (8,500 km) at 15 knots (28 km/h)
- Complement: 223
- Armament: As built: 1 × twin 4.5 inch (114 mm) guns; 1 × quadruple Sea Cat anti-aircraft missile launchers; 1 × Limbo anti-submarine mortar; From 1980: 4 × Exocet anti-ship missile launchers; 1 × GWS 25 Sea Wolf anti-aircraft missile launcher; 2 × single 40 mm Bofors anti-aircraft guns; 2 × triple torpedo tubes
- Aircraft carried: 1 × Westland Wasp helicopter; From 1980: 1 × Lynx helicopter

HMS Scylla (F71) was the last Leander-class frigate built for the Royal Navy (RN). She was the fifth vessel in the Royal Navy to be named after the Sea Monster who devoured the victims of the whirlpool, Charybdis, and was commonly referred to as "Aberdeen's frigate".

Scylla was constructed at Devonport Royal Dockyard, originally for Anti-submarine warfare. She was commissioned in 1970, taken out of service in 1993 in accordance with Options for Change, and sunk as an artificial reef in 2004 off Whitsand Bay, Cornwall.

== Construction ==
In early 1966, the British Admiralty ordered Scylla, a "Broad-Beam" Leander-class frigate from Devonport Dockyard at a cost of £6,600,000.

Scylla was laid down on 17 May 1967 by sponsor Joyce Talbot, the wife of Commander-in-Chief, Plymouth, Vice-Admiral, Sir Fitzroy Talbot.

She was launched at Devonport on 8 August 1968 and commissioned at Portsmouth on 14 February 1970, receiving the pennant number F71, by sponsor Katherine Foley, the wife of Maurice Foley.

She was built to a length of 372 feet (113 m), a beam of 43 feet (13 m) and a draught of 19 feet (5.8 m), featuring two Babcock & Wilcox boilers supplying steam to two sets of White-English Electric double-reduction geared turbines to two shafts, which produce and excess of 33,000 shaft horsepower (25,000 kW), capable of propelling her at speeds over 28 knots (52 km/h; 32 mph).

She was later issued an updated sonar system as her existing one had become obsolete, rendering her vulnerable to advanced threats. The original Westland Wasp on board Scylla was later replaced by a Westland Lynx.

== Royal Navy service ==
=== Early service (1970–1977) ===
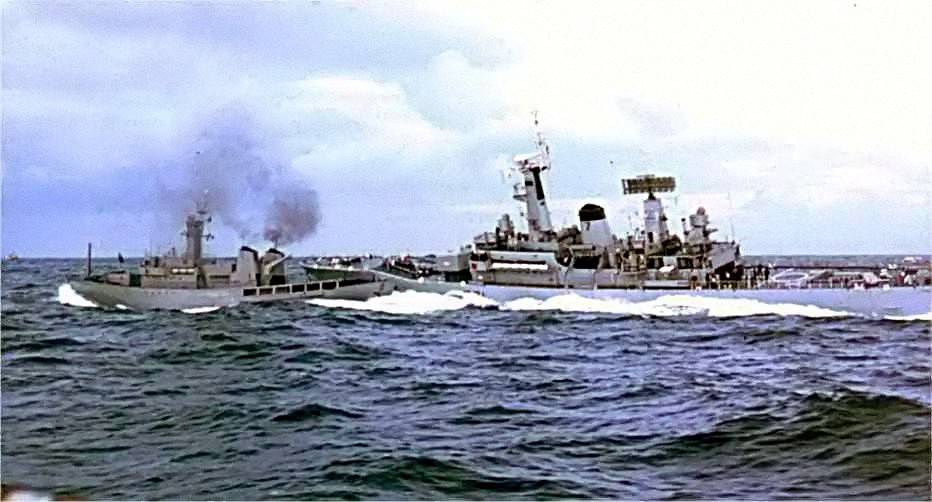
HMS Scylla (right) and Icelandic Coast Guard Vessel Óðinn collide, during the Second Cod War

On 22 January 1973, Scylla collided with the Torpoint ferry, one of three separate collisions involving four warships on the same day. Her collision had occurred while on sea trials following a refit. While she resumed her journey, the ferry sustained a three-foot (0.91 m) gash at the bow. A court martial in May reprimanded Scylla's commanding officer, Captain Peter Sutton. In May, she was deployed with other frigates to support the Royal Navy's operations against Iceland during the Second Cod War. The frigate conducted patrols to counter Icelandic coast guard ships targeting fishing vessels. On 1 June, the Icelandic gunboat Aegir collided with her, the first such incident to occur during the fishing dispute.

Fishing relations with Iceland deteriorated further in 1975, and the dispute escalated into the Third Cod War. From February 1976, she began operating in support of British fishing trawlers. In May, she provided the escort to the royal yacht Britannia during Queen Elizabeth II's state visit to Finland. She attended the Spithead Fleet Review, held in honour of Queen Elizabeth II's Silver Jubilee. During that review she was situated between Berwick and sister ship Euryalus.

=== Middle of service (1978–1987) ===
In 1980, Scylla provided support when Cayman Brac, part of the Cayman Islands, was struck by a powerful hurricane. Scylla went into refit in 1980, to provision the frigate with Type 2016 sonar, Exocet and Sea Wolf missile launchers, and a Westland Lynx helicopter. The refit lasted four years, and cost £79,692,000, rendering the frigate unavailable for service in the Falklands.

After being recommissioned, she acted as guard ship for the West Indies and patrolled the Persian Gulf as part of Armilla Patrol.. In November 1986 at the end of her first Armilla Patrol, she was the escort to Britannia during the Prince and Princess of Wales' visit to the Middle East firing a Royal Salute off Matrah, Oman and also visiting Jiddah. The Princess of Wales flew home from Hurghada and she then escorted Britannia north through the Suez Canal and on to Akrotiri, Cyprus where Prince Charles disembarked.

While on Armilla Patrol in late December 1987, she and USS Elrod twice intervened after two ships, the Korean Hyundai No 7 and British Eastern Power, were targeted by Iranian gunships. After the Korean vessel had been attacked south of Abu Musa Island, Scylla's crew launched the frigate's Westland Lynx helicopter and evacuated some of the ship's crew.

=== Late service (1988–1993) ===
In 1990, Scylla was assigned a new commanding officer, Malcom S. Williams on 16 June, later undergoing a major 10-month refit at Rosyth, an official re-dedication at Her Majesty's naval base, Portsmouth, 2 November 1990.

By 1993, she had become the last representative of her class in active service. The frigate's last deployment came that year when she deployed to the South Atlantic. By then she was showing her age, and it had become difficult for the ship's engineers to maintain. She suffered steering problems while on patrol and collided with the accompanying tanker RFA Gold Rover. While Scylla suffered only superficial damage, Gold Rover had to have repairs for hull damage. She was decommissioned in December 1993.

On 8 June 1992, Scylla, with the commanding officer, officers and members of the ship's company in attendance, was granted the Freedom of the City of Aberdeen.

== Sinking and use as a dive site ==
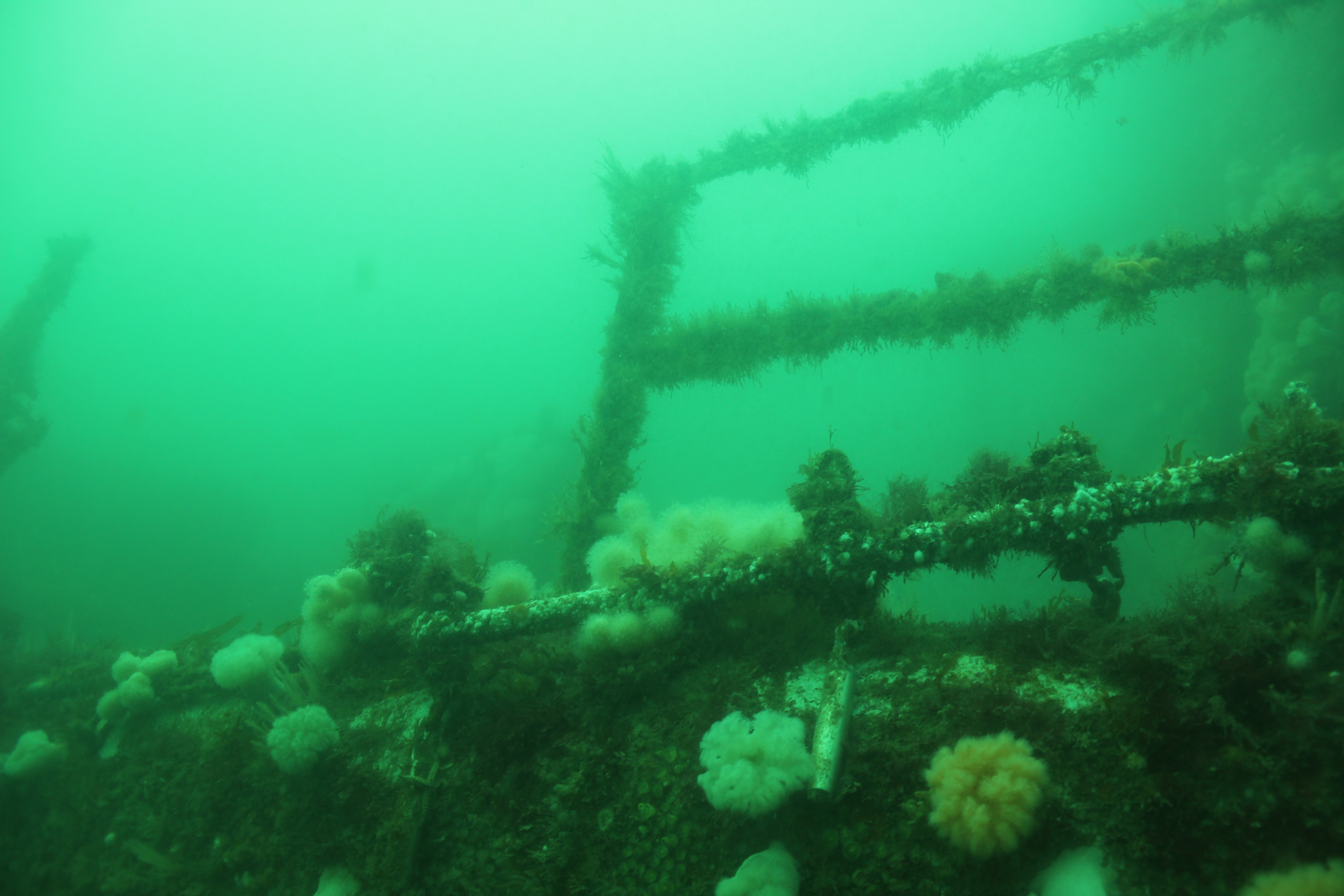
Wreckage of HMS Scylla in 2015

Scylla was bought by the National Marine Aquarium for £200,000 and on 27 March 2004 she was sunk off Whitsand Bay, Cornwall, to form the first such artificial reef in Europe. She was 'planted' on a 24-metre (79 ft) sandy seabed at 50°19.655′N 4°15.162′W approximately 500 metres (1,600 ft) from the wreck of the Liberty ship James Eagan Layne, which has been a dive site for many years.

Within three months of sinking the wreck was colonised by sea anemone, mussels and scallops and by six months sea urchin and starfish were found in large numbers. By 2021, 250 species have been recorded.

In 2007 two amateur divers were killed after entering the wreck. Two more experienced divers died inside the engine room on deck three in September 2021. There are fears that the continuing deposition close to the wreck of dredged waste from the Tamar estuary has led to large quantities of silt spreading through the ship and frequently mixing with the moving water reducing visibility, thereby preventing divers from finding their way out before their air supply diminishes. Following a 2014 survey the National Marine Aquarium who manage the site advised divers not to enter the wreck and solely to undertake scenic dives.

== Publications ==
- Colledge, J. J.; Warlow, Ben (2006) [1969]. Ships of the Royal Navy: The Complete Record of All Fighting Ships of the Royal Navy from the 15th Century to the Present (3rd Rev ed.). London: Chatham Publishing. ISBN 978-1-86176-281-8. OCLC 67375475.
- Marriott, Leo, 1983. Royal Navy Frigates 1945–1983, Ian Allan Ltd. ISBN 07110 1322 5
- Osborne, Richard; Sowdon, David (1990). Leander Class Frigates. Kendal, UK: World Ships Society. ISBN 0-905617-56-8.
- Roberts, John (2009), Safeguarding the Nation: The Story of the Modern Royal Navy, Seaforth Publishing. ISBN 978-1-84832-043-7

Return to HMS Scylla (F71).

Privacy policyAbout WikipediaDisclaimersContact WikipediaLegal & safety contactsCode of ConductDevelopersStatisticsCookie statementMobile view Wikimedia Foundation Powered by MediaWiki

View source for HMS Scylla (F71)

Add languages
