= Net cutter (fisheries patrol) =

Net cutters
- Net cutters
- Place of origin: Iceland

Service history
- In service: 1958–present
- Used by: Iceland; Norway; Brazil
- Wars: Cod Wars; Lobster War

Production history
- Designer: R.Adm Pétur Sigurðsson
- Manufacturer: Icelandic Coast Guard Armory and others
- No. built: unknown
- Variants: normal and explosive versions

Specifications
- Length: approx. 2 metres

Net cutters, or trawlwire cutters, are secret weapons that were employed by the Icelandic Coast Guard during the latter two Cod Wars to cut the trawling wires of foreign fishing trawlers working within the then newly claimed Exclusive Fisheries zones.

They were invented by Commander Pétur Sigurðsson, Director of the Coast Guard, with assistance from Friðrik Teitsson from the Icelandic lighthouse institution and Tómas Sigurðsson, who were both ironmongers. The invention was known as the trawlwire cutter, and was tested in 1958—but not used until 5 September 1972, after every Icelandic ship had been equipped with it.

== The first net cutting ==
On September 5, 1972, at 10:25 ICGV Ægir, under Cdr. Guðmundur Kjærnested's command, encountered an unmarked trawler fishing northeast of Hornbanki. The master of this black-hulled trawler refused to divulge the trawler's name and number, and, after being warned to follow the Coast Guard's orders, played Rule, Britannia! over the radio. At 10:40 the net cutter was deployed into the water for the first time and Ægir sailed along the trawler's port side. The fishermen tossed a thick nylon rope into the water as the patrol ship closed in, attempting to disable its propeller. After passing the trawler, Ægir veered to the trawler's starboard side. The net cutter, 160 fathoms (290 m) behind the patrol vessel, sliced one of the trawling wires. As ICGV Ægir came about to circle the unidentified trawler, its angry crew threw coal as well as garbage and a large fire axe at the Coast Guard vessel. A considerable amount of swearing and shouting came through the radio, which resulted in the trawler being identified as Peter Scott (H103).

== Other users ==
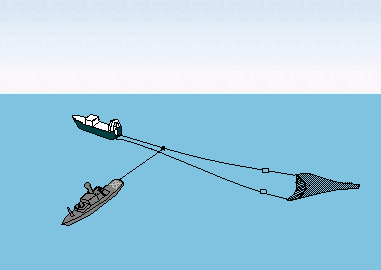
How net cutters are used.

Net cutters have not only been used by the Icelandic Coast Guard. The Norwegian Coast Guard has had the net cutters in its inventory for a long time and has successfully used them against Icelandic trawlers near Svalbard. However, during the first Norwegian usage of the net cutters they were employed on a small inflatable boat and were not as effective as on a full size patrol ship, resulting in one set of net cutters being "captured" by the Icelandic trawler. Shortly afterwards Icelandic coast guard officials made comments about the net cutters being "Used in a wrong manner",. The Norwegian Coast Guard heeded this and as a result did not employ inflatable boats with net cutters.

The Norwegian net cutters had also been slightly modified, and some speculations arose in Icelandic media as to the legality of other users of net cutters.

The Brazilian Navy used some of their own designed net cutters during Lobster War in 1961–63, against French fishing ships off Brazilian waters.

List of known users:

- Iceland
- Norway
- Brazil

== See also ==
- Torpedo net cutter
- Net cutter (submarine)
