= Aarhus Flydedok =

Danish manufacturing company

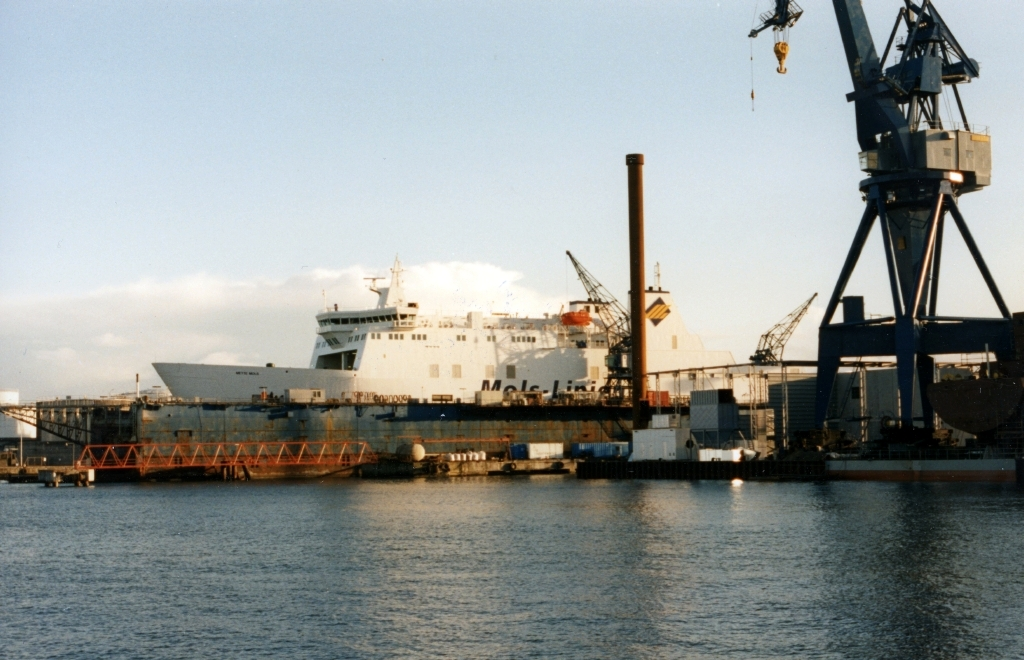
- Aarhus Flydedok A/S
- Type: Public limited company
- Industry: Manufacturing
- Founded: 1945
- Founder: Hans Nielsen
- Headquarters: Aarhus
- Area served: Worldwide
- Products: Ships, repairs

Aarhus Flydedok (Colloquially.: Flydedokken) was a company and floating dry dock in Aarhus, Denmark. The company was established in 1945 based on installations left by occupying German forces. From the mid to late 20th century it became one of the largest employers in the city and employed some 900 workers at its height. Aarhus Flydedok both produced and repaired ships although in its later years production focused on smaller vessels. The company entered bankruptcy proceedings in 1999 and finally closed in 2003.

== History ==
Aarhus Flydedok was founded in 1945 but the early history extends back to the earlier 20th century. In 1913, Hans Nielsen, a lathe operator who had worked at the Frichs ironworks, started the small machine shop Hans Nielsens Maskinfabrik to service cranes, elevators and other transport infrastructure. The company over time transitioned to servicing ships and by the start of the Second World War in 1939 and the Occupation of Denmark in 1930 the machine shop handled almost all ship repairs in Aarhus harbor while also doing subcontracting work for Helsingør Skibsværft (Elsinore Ship Yard).

Shortly after the war ended in 1945 Hans Nielsen and Helsingør Skibsværft created a new shipyard in Aarhus named I/S Aarhus Flydedok og Maskinkompagni. In 1941 Germany had built a floating dock in Korsør, used as a submarine dock, which was moved to Aarhus harbor on 16 August 1945. The dock had been sabotaged by the Danish resistance movement but after a few months of repairs it was back in service and along with the new dock a hall for shipbuilding and a repair facility was constructed on the harbor front. The first task of the new shipyard was to repair German minesweepers which were cleaning the Danish territorial waters of mines. In 1948 the company was turned into a public limited company under the name Aarhus Flydedok og Maskinkompagni A/S with Helsingør Skibsværft as the main stockholder. The ownership of the facilities were not finalized until 1952 when the United Kingdom officially transferred the dock to the Danish state after which Orlogsværftet temporarily leased it to Aarhus Flydedok before ownership was fully transferred on 1 January 1958.

Up to 1967 the company was healthy and in the early 1960s it employed some 900 people; during this time the harbor facilities were expanded when a 2,000 m^{2} (22,000 sq ft) workshop was constructed in Risskov. In 1968 the shipyard suffered from fewer orders and were forced to cut the employees to about 450. In 1970 the board considered closing the company down but instead the company Rederiselskabet Dannebrog bought the shipyard from Helsingør Skibsværft. In 1972 the company changed name to Århus Flydedok A/S although some orders were still completed under the old name. In 1976 the shipyard changed name again to Dannebrog Værft A/S, Århus.

From 1972 to 1984 the company was profitable again and there were enough orders to keep the department of shipbuilding running. The Danish shipyards suffered a general decline starting in the 1979s and employment dropped from 20,000 in 1976 to 14,000 in 1980. In the 1980s the crisis also reached Århus Flydedok and the number of employees fell to 180 in 1989. The company was close to bankruptcy when it was bought by the Ringkøbing based company Nordsøværftets Holding A/S and the investment funds Lønmodtagernes Dyrtidsfond and Kommunernes Pensionsforsikring. The company was renamed Aarhus Flydedok A/S again. The shipbuilding department transitioned to smaller products in larger volumes while the repair department continued unchanged. The changes worked for a while but another crisis in the 1990s resulted in a bankruptcy in 1999. The shipyard employed 800 workers at the time. The last orders were filled after the company closed in 2003.
