= List of Royal Navy deployments =

List of Royal Navy deployments is a list of operations and commitments undertaken by the United Kingdom's Royal Navy on a worldwide basis. The following list details these commitments and deployments sorted by region and in alphabetical order. Routine deployments made by the Navy's nuclear-powered submarines and their location of operations is classified.

== Atlantic ==
=== Antarctic Patrol ===
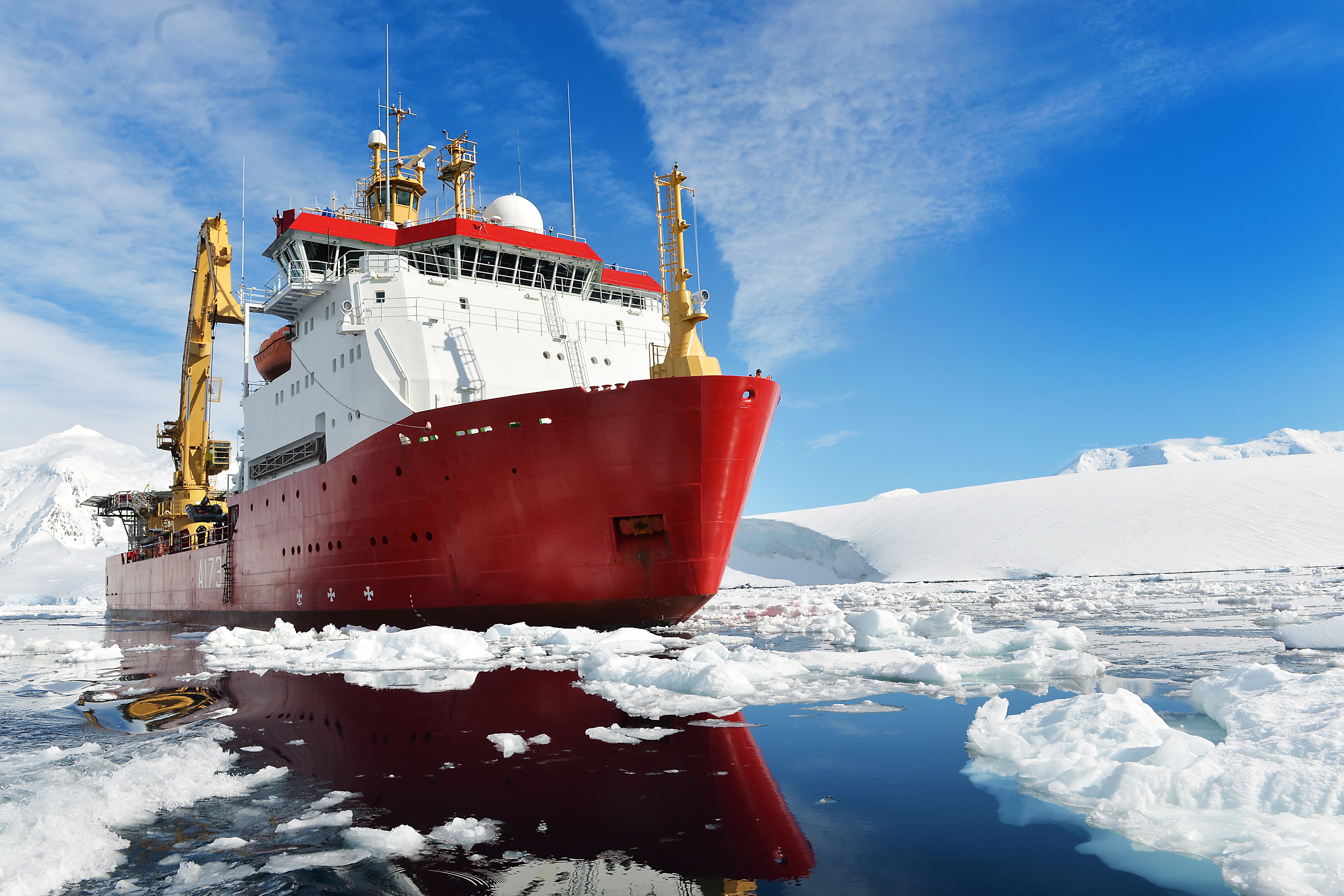
Protector on Antarctic Patrol

Antarctic Patrol is undertaken during the regional summer by the Royal Navy's Icebreaker and survey ship, HMS Protector, in the South Atlantic Ocean. Its primary mission is "surveying and gathering data on the seas around Antarctica" while also providing support to the British Antarctic Survey operation stationed in and around the British Antarctic Territory. A Royal Research Ship is also deployed during the regional summer; RRS Sir David Attenborough.

=== Atlantic Patrol Tasking North ===
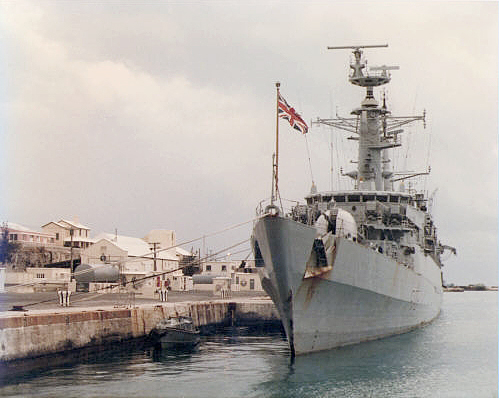
Former HMS Ambuscade at the South Yard (HMS Malabar) of the Royal Naval Dockyard, Bermuda in 1988

Formerly known as the West Indies Guard Ship, the remnant of the former America and West Indies Station. This is the Royal Navy's commitment to secure and protect the interests of the United Kingdom and British Overseas Territories in the regions of the North Atlantic and the Caribbean. The deployment primarily conducts counter narcotics missions and provides humanitarian assistance during hurricane season.

This tasking was augmented by Operation Ruman in 2017 as a result of damage caused by Hurricane Irma.

The task is intermittently carried out by a single warship, or more recently by a River-class offshore patrol vessel or a Royal Fleet Auxiliary vessel.

=== Atlantic Patrol Tasking South ===
The Royal Navy has maintained a permanent presence in the South Atlantic and West Africa to provide "ongoing protection and reassurance to British interests" such as the sovereignty of the Falkland Islands and South Georgia, while also supporting British Forces South Atlantic Islands. The commitment has, at times, consisted of two warships; either a guided-missile destroyer or frigate accompanied by a Royal Fleet Auxiliary vessel. Since 2015, a major warship has not been deployed. As of 2026, the commitment is maintained by a River-class offshore patrol vessel. The 2021 defence white paper indicated that henceforth, one River-class offshore patrol vessel, HMS Trent, would also be permanently based in Gibraltar for operations in the Mediterranean and also in the Gulf of Guinea. However, as of 2026, the commitment is maintained more intermittently.

=== Falkland Islands Patrol Task ===
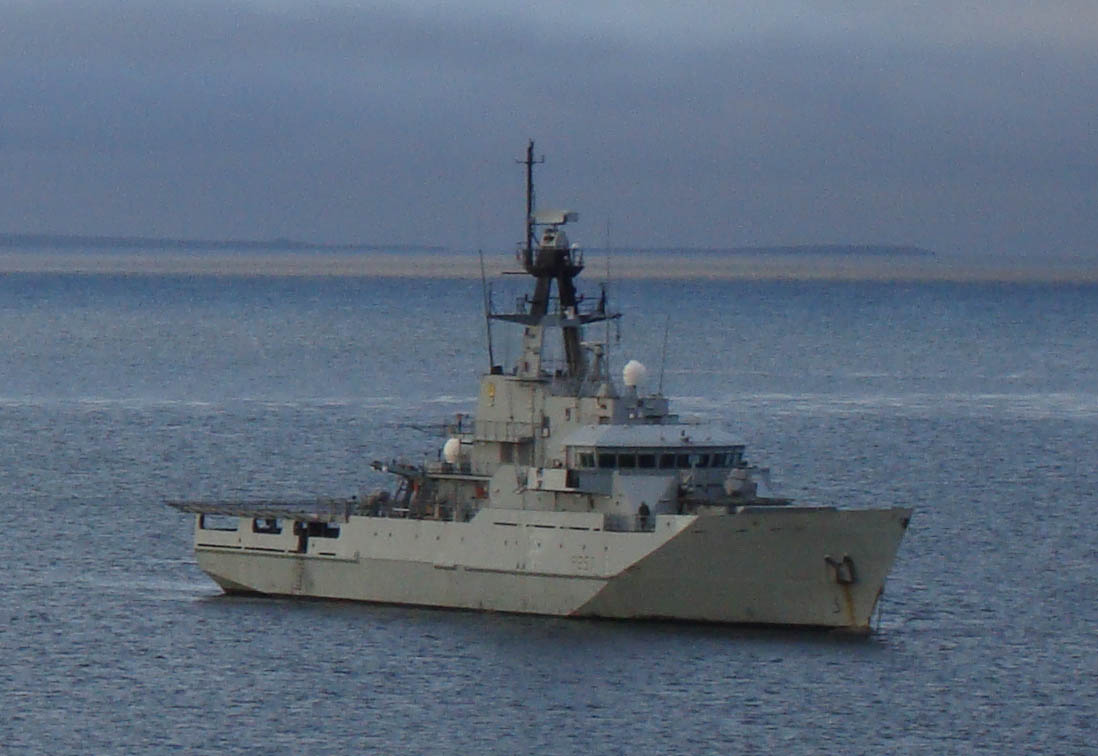
Former HMS Clyde patrols off West Falkland

The Falkland Islands Patrol Task consists of a single warship (a River-class offshore patrol vessel) stationed around the EEZ of the Falkland Islands. It forms part of British Forces South Atlantic Islands and aims to reassure the inhabitants of the region and maintain British sovereignty.

HMS Forth (P222) was permanently assigned to the task from November 2019 until the end of 2025. However, in late-2025, the tasking was assumed by her sister ship, HMS Medway. Royal Navy ships operating in the region use the deepwater naval base facilities of East Cove Military Port at Mare Harbour, East Falkland.

=== Standing NATO Maritime Group 1 ===
The Standing NATO Maritime Group 1 is part of the wider NATO Response Force, its standard area of operations is the Atlantic Ocean. As of Feb 2023, the latest contribution to the task group was the Type 23 HMS Portland.

== British and Northern European Waters ==
=== Littoral Response Group (North) ===
Littoral Response Group (North), is the lead formation, based in Europe, with an area of responsibility in the Atlantic, Baltic and Mediterranean. As of 2024, it includes a Bay-class landing ship dock and a company of 45 Commando Royal Marines and supporting elements. While an Albion-class landing platform dock is nominally assigned to LRG (North), both Albion-class vessels were in reserve as of 2024 with HMS Bulwark only to be activated "if required". Then in late 2024, the newly elected Labour government indicated that the Albion-class ships would in fact be taken out of service, putting the entire Littoral Response Group concept into question.

LRG (North) had been supported by other Royal Navy and allied assets, including the Royal Navy's Carrier Strike Group, as required.

=== Baltops ===
Baltops is an annual 2-week exercise run by the US Navy. It is an exercise in which several NATO members come together to take part in a huge multinational exercise designed to strengthen the bonds of international partnership. The 2021 exercises included Royal Navy ships HMS Albion and RFA Mounts Bay.

=== Cold Weather Training ===
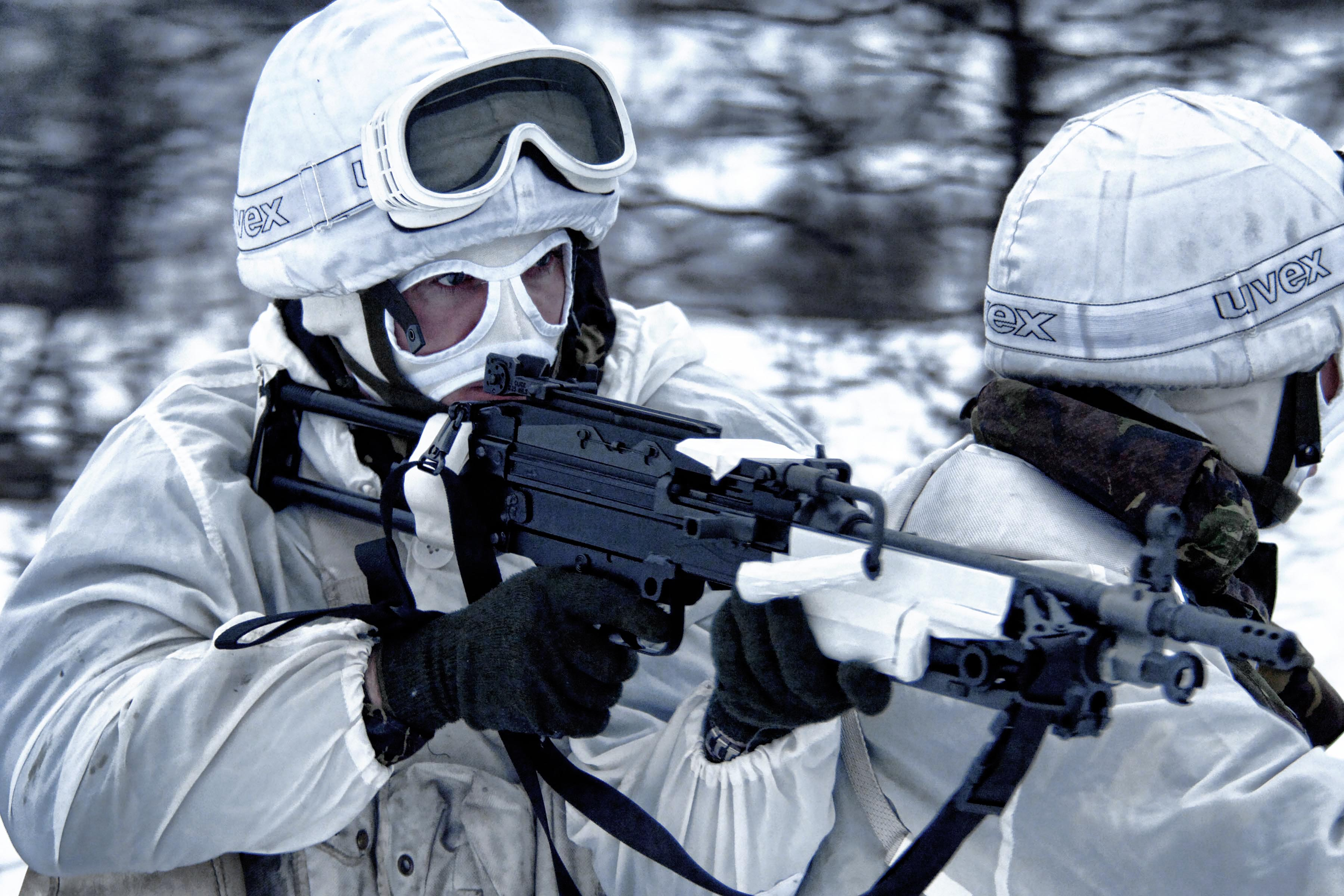
Royal Marines during the annual Cold Weather Training exercise in the Norwegian Arctic

Cold Weather Training is a Royal Navy commitment to the annual Norwegian-led exercise in the Arctic regions. Its purpose is to build and strengthen military ties and to enable the Royal Marines and Royal Navy sailors to "fight and win" in extreme conditions.

=== Faslane Patrol Boat Squadron ===
The Faslane Patrol Boat Squadron (FPBS) provides force protection in around the waters of HMNB Clyde, where the Royal Navy's nuclear-powered submarine fleet is based. The squadron currently consists of HMS Tracker and HMS Raider.

=== Fishery Protection ===
The Fishery Protection Squadron is charged with protecting the British fishing industry, providing security to the oil and gas fields in the North Sea and other duties in the United Kingdom's Exclusive economic zone. It consists of three warships: HMS Tyne, HMS Severn and HMS Mersey.

=== Fleet Ready Escort ===
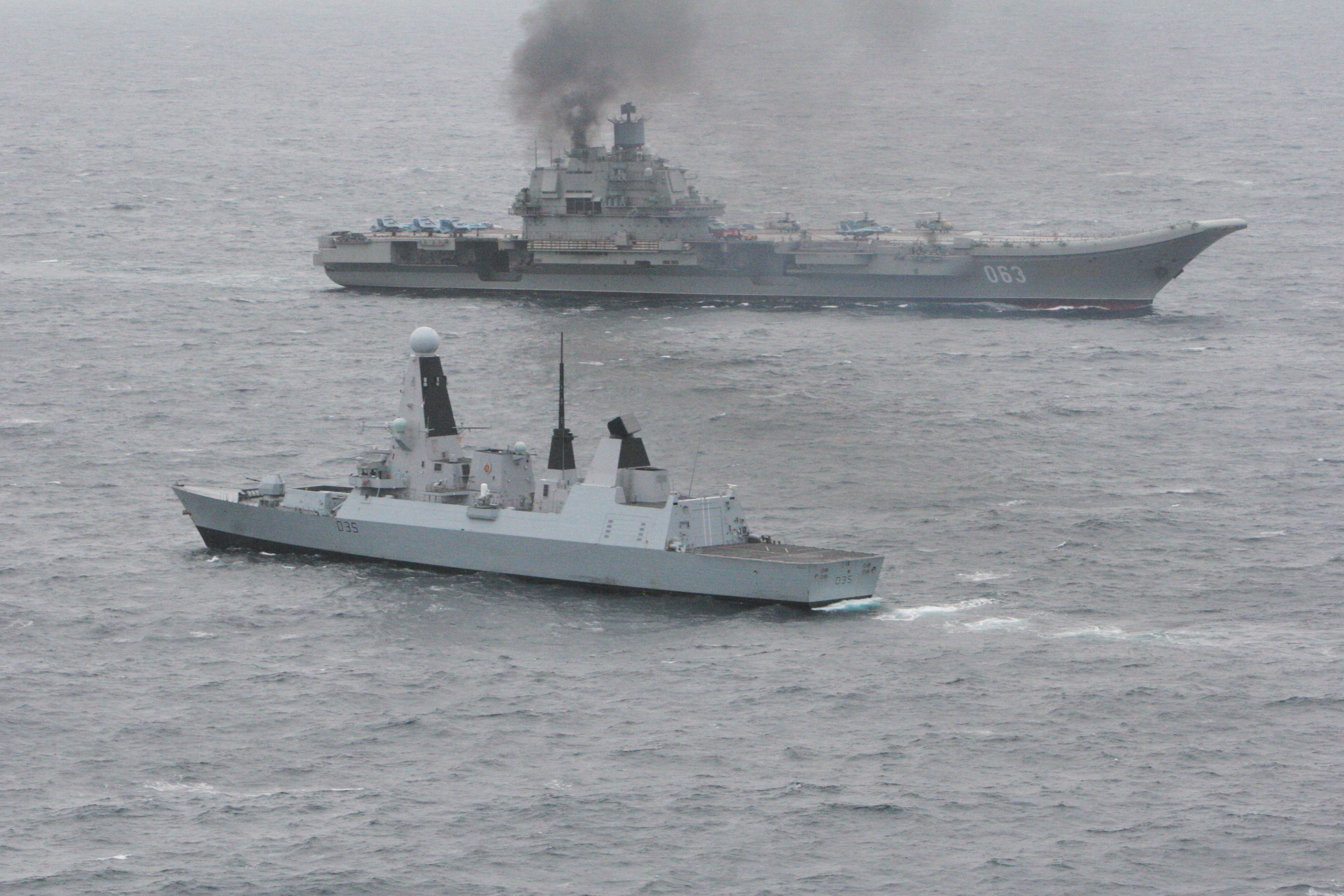
Fleet Ready Escort HMS Dragon escorting the Russian aircraft carrier, Admiral Kuznetsov, through the English Channel

The Fleet Ready Escort (FRE) is a single warship maintained at high readiness for deployment at short notice anywhere in the world. The FRE consists of either a guided-missile destroyer or a frigate. As of January 2014, this commitment has been 'gapped' by the Royal Navy twice; for 19 days in 2011 and 18 days in 2012.

=== Fleet Operational Sea Training ===
Training in UK Home Waters is essential for preparing both crews and ships before overseas deployment. Flag Officer Sea Training (FOST) is responsible for making sure that both Royal Navy and Royal Fleet Auxiliary ships are fit for operational purpose after rigorous exercises and readiness inspections. This commitment is ongoing 365 days a year.

=== Joint Warrior ===
Exercise Joint Warrior is a Royal Navy (and wider British Armed Forces) commitment to engage in a biannual tri-service exercise (including multinational NATO forces) intended to achieve enhanced military effect. It is the largest military exercise in Europe.

=== Towed Array Patrol Ship ===
Towed Array Patrol Ship (TAPS) is a standing task for reactive anti-submarine patrol duties in support of the Continuous At Sea Deterrent (Trident). A Type 23 frigate is maintained at high readiness for this task 365 days a year.

== East of Suez ==
This is a list of operations and commitments presently undertaken by the Royal Navy East of Suez in the Red Sea, Gulf of Aden, Persian Gulf, Arabian Sea, the wider Indian Ocean and the Far East:

=== Combined Task Force ===
The Royal Navy regularly contributes to two multinational coalitions; Combined Task Force 150 and Combined Task Force 151. Combined Task Force 150 is focused on maritime security and counter-terrorism; while Combined Task Force 151 is charged with anti-piracy missions.

=== Humanitarian Missions ===
The Royal Navy remains committed to providing humanitarian aid East of Suez.

=== Operation Kipion ===
Operation Kipion was an ongoing maritime presence in the Gulf and Indian Ocean by the Royal Navy to protect and secure the nation's many political and commercial interests. The enduring commitment usually consisted of an escort (a guided-missile destroyer or frigate), a supporting Royal Fleet Auxiliary ship and several other ships with various roles. Operation Kipion was formerly known as the Armilla patrol during the 1980s and 1990s.

In August 2022, HMS Lancaster departed Portsmouth en route to the Gulf to replace HMS Montrose as the forward deployed Type 23 frigate and Montrose departed the Gulf to return to the U.K. in November 2022. However, as of 2025/26, both HMS Lancaster and vessels from the navy's 9th Mine Counter-Measures Squadron were withdrawn from the region and it was unclear how or whether they will be replaced.

=== Operation Kipion Mine Countermeasures ===
The Royal Navy maintained a permanent presence in the Gulf consisting of mine countermeasure vessels. These provided continued support to the region ensuring the "safe flow of trade and oil". Typically the mine countermeasure vessels were supported by a Royal Fleet Auxiliary ship acting as a 'mothership'.

As of 2025/26, these forces were withdrawn from the region.

=== Littoral Response Group (South) ===
Littoral Response Group (South), to deploy from late 2023, is to be based at the UK Joint Logistics Support Base in Duqm, Oman with responsibility for the Indo-Pacific. As of 2023, the principal vessels for LRG (South) were RFAs Argus and Lyme Bay. The LRG concept provides the UK options in an era of sub-threshold competition, a "grey zone" where nation states and actors compete in a hostile manner using tactics below the threshold of war. The newly elected Labour government's decision to retire the Albion-class assault ships meant that, in future, only vessels from the Royal Fleet Auxiliary would be available to equip both Littoral Response Groups North and South. This put the viability of the concept into question.

=== Indian Ocean/Pacific Offshore Patrol Vessels ===
In September 2021, two Offshore Patrol Vessels, HMS Tamar and HMS Spey, sailed from the U.K. for a planned five to ten-year deployment in the Indian Ocean/Pacific region. The vessels were to be assigned missions ranging from "security patrols to deal with drug-running, smuggling, terrorism and other illegal activities" to "joining in exercises with other navies and armed forces". Crews would be rotated to the ships on a regular basis and the ships were expected to operate from friendly ports as required, though the primary logistics hub is at the British Defence Singapore Support Unit in Singapore.

== Global ==
=== Continuous At Sea Deterrent ===
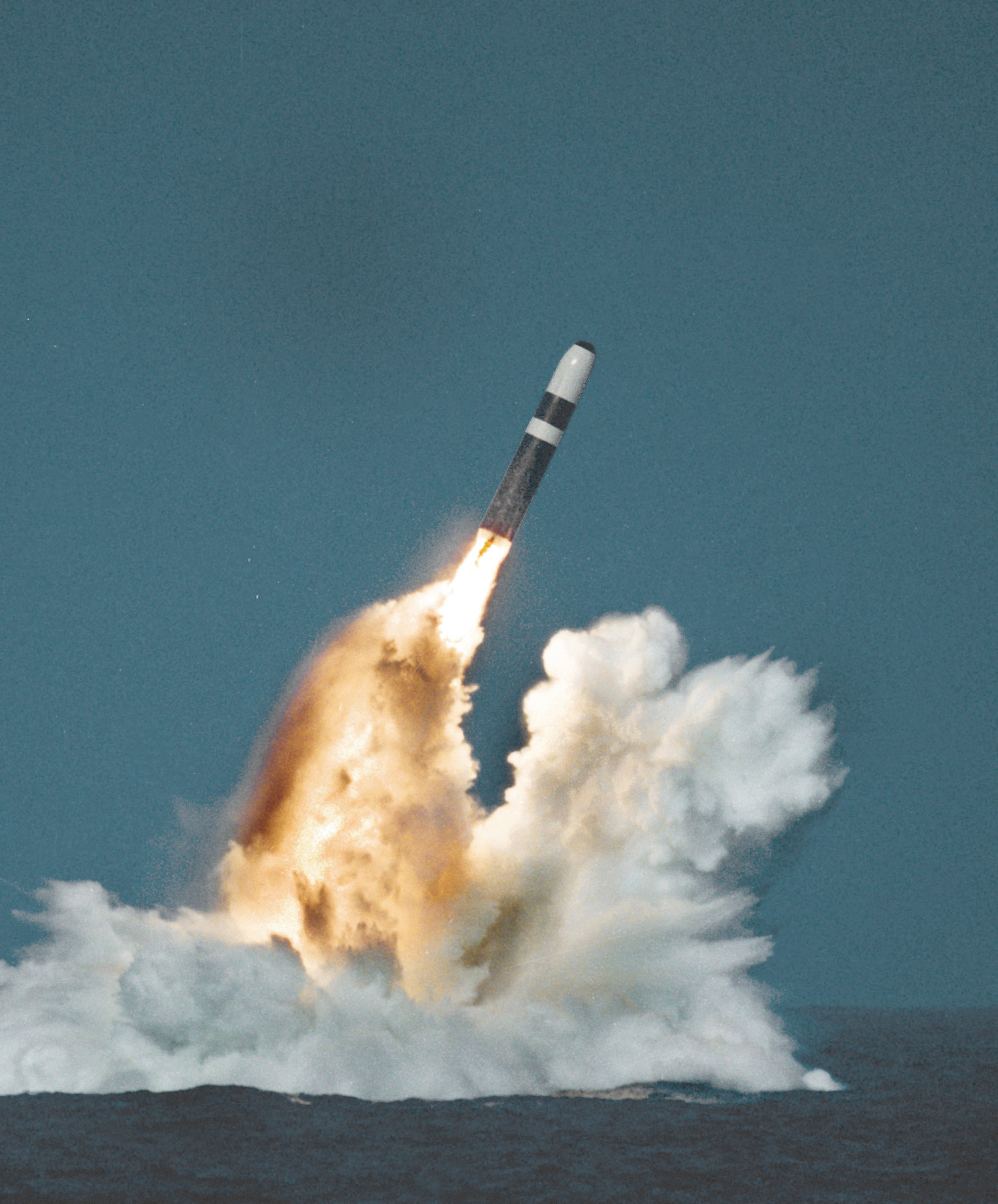
A Trident II D-5 ballistic missile launched from a Vanguard-class submarine

The Continuous At Sea Deterrent (CASD; or, Trident) is provided by the Royal Navy's four Vanguard-class submarines which deploy on a continuous basis around the globe. The Vanguard-class are each armed with a maximum of 16 Trident II D-5 submarine-launched ballistic missiles and 48 nuclear warheads.

=== International Partnerships ===
The Royal Navy remains committed to working with its International Partners around the globe. The principal purpose of these partnerships is to reassure allied nations, to share intelligence and expertise, to build trust and ultimately provide security across the worlds oceans. Examples of such International Partnerships of which the Royal Navy plays a leading role include; the maritime component of the Anglo-French Combined Joint Expeditionary Force (CJEF), the North Atlantic Treaty Organization, AUSCANNZUKUS, the European Maritime Force and the Five Power Defence Arrangements. The United Kingdom is a member of RIMPAC also, although it hasn't participated in way of deploying a surface ship in several years.

=== Joint Expeditionary Force (Maritime) ===
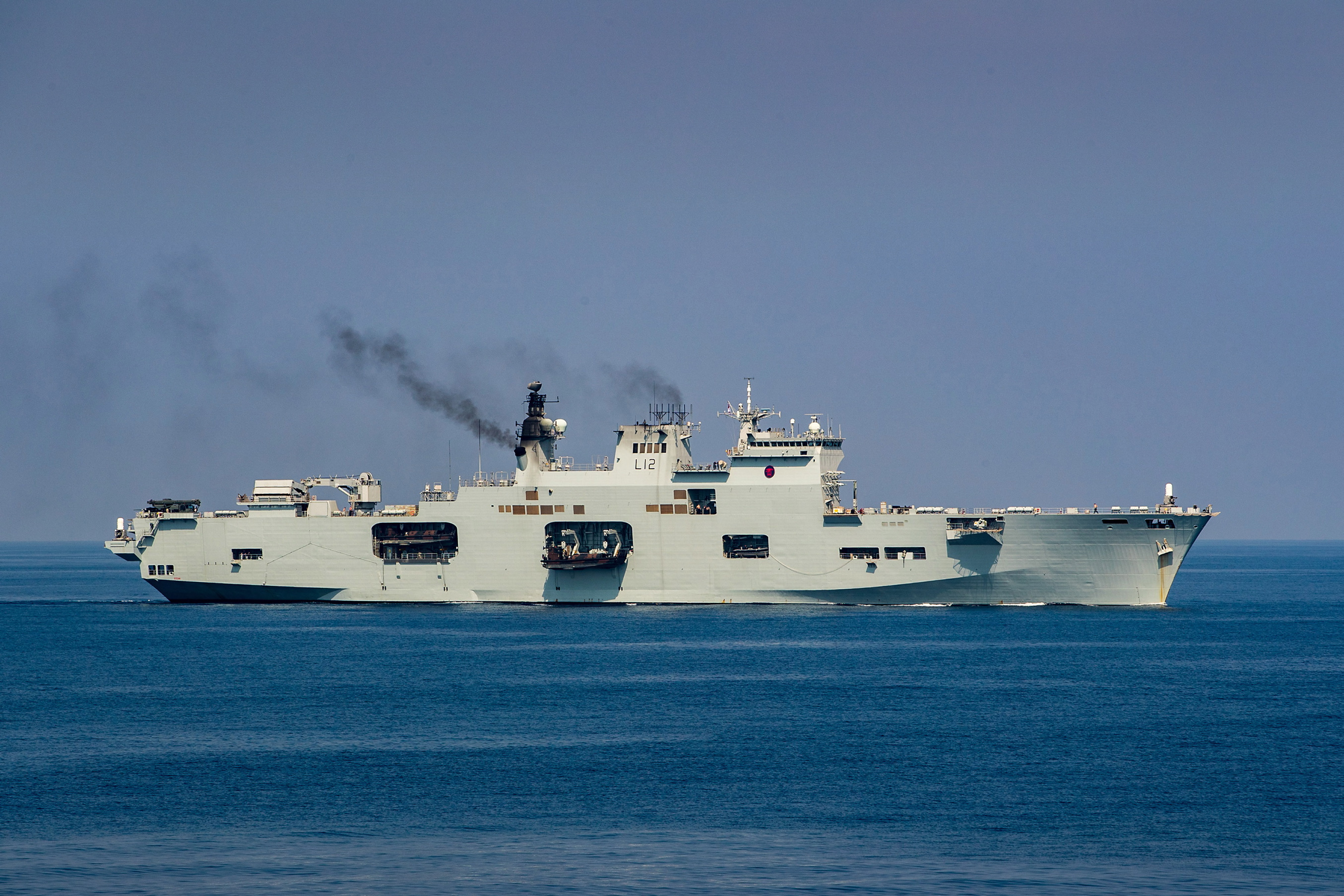
Former LPH HMS Ocean during the JEF(M) Amphibious Task Group in October 2016

Joint Expeditionary Force (Maritime) (JEF(M)) -formerly the Response Force Task Group (RFTG) created under the 2010 Strategic Defence and Security Review- is the Royal Navy's amphibious expeditionary task group maintained at high-readiness and available at short notice to respond to unexpected global events. In addition to amphibious operations, the JEF(M) can undertake a diverse range of activities such as evacuation operations, disaster relief or humanitarian aid. The composition of the JEF(M) generally consists of several large amphibious warfare ships (both RN and RFA) and replenishment ships from the Royal Fleet Auxiliary.

To demonstrate the operational readiness and global reach of the JEF(M), the Royal Navy deploys the amphibious task group on annual large scale international exercises, primarily in the Mediterranean and Indian Ocean. As an international deployment, the JEF(M) gets the chance to engage in "intense" exercises with foreign and allied navies, such as (for example) the Royal Navy of Oman.

The 2021 JEF (M) is centred on the Type 23's HMS Lancaster and HMS Westminster supported by RFA Tiderace (A137) where they are operating in the Baltic. HMS Lancaster is the flagship for the group. The group comprises Estonian, Latvian and Lithuanian vessels supported by aircraft from Sweden. The group have recently been operating with SNMG1 within the baltic.

=== NATO Mine Countermeasures ===
This is the Royal Navy's commitment to support NATO MCM operations in the Baltic, Northern European Waters, the Atlantic and the Mediterranean Sea (though it is capable of deploying globally if needed). There are two organisational structures; Standing NATO Mine Countermeasures Group 1 and Standing NATO Mine Countermeasures Group 2.

As of April 2022 the latest ship to be assigned was HMS Grimsby (M108) with Standing NATO Mine Countermeasures Group 1.

=== UK Carrier Strike Group ===
Since 2015, the Royal Navy has maintained a carrier strike group based around the Queen Elizabeth-class aircraft carriers with the aim to facilitate carrier-enabled power projection. It took to sea for the first time in October 2020 and its inaugural operational deployment is scheduled for 2021. CGS21 will demonstrate a fully sovereign UK carrier strike group comprising: HMS Queen Elizabeth (R08), HMS Diamond (D34), HMS Defender (D36), HMS Kent (F78), HMS Richmond (F239), an attack submarine of the Astute class, RFA Fort Victoria (A387) and a Tide-class tanker. Also accompanying will be a U.S. Navy destroyer USS The Sullivans.

== Mediterranean ==
=== Gibraltar Squadron ===
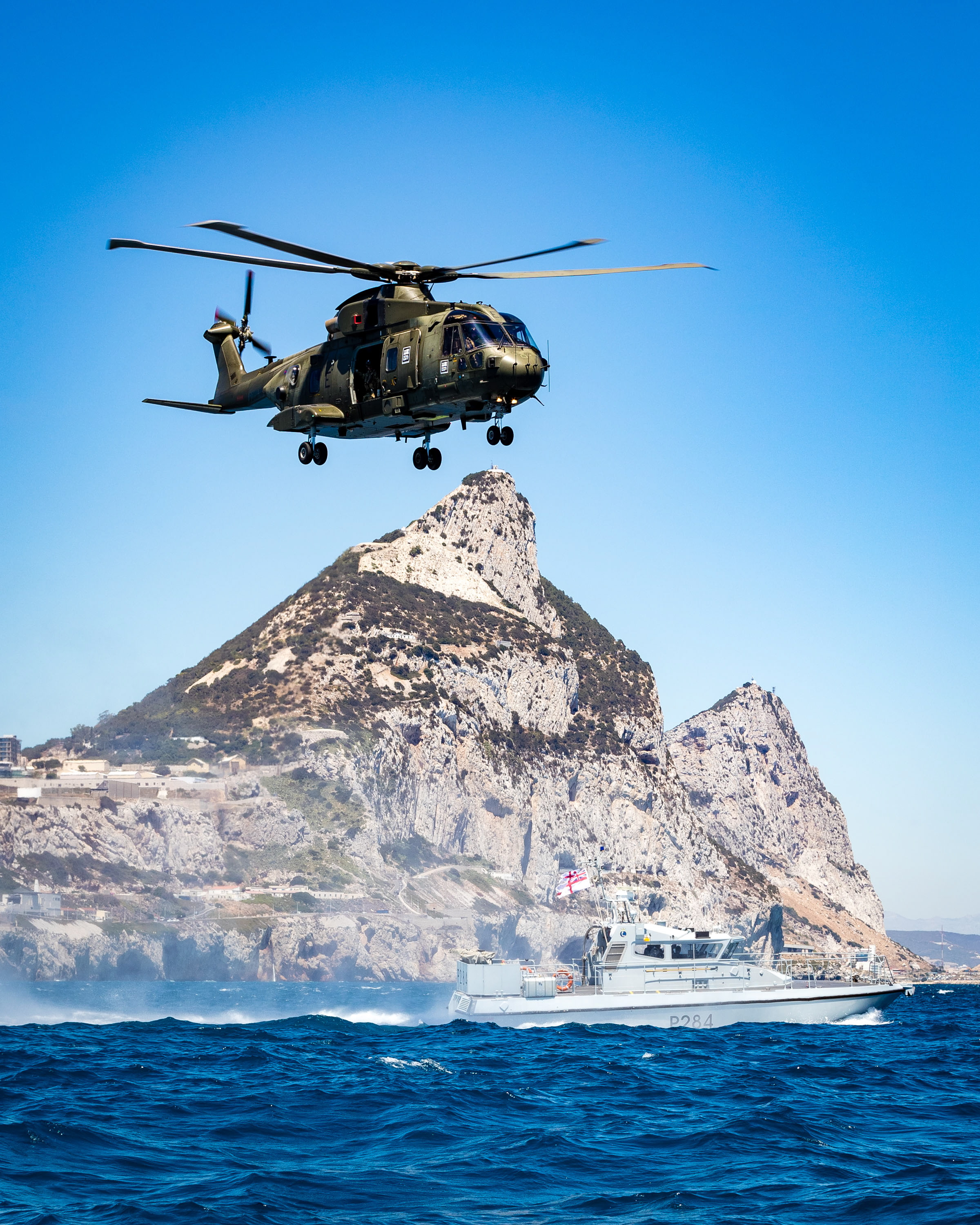
Merlin HC3 of 846 NAS with former HMS Scimitar in British territorial waters off Gibraltar

The Gibraltar Squadron consists of two fast patrol boats: HMS Cutlass (P295) and HMS Dagger (P296). The squadron provides force protection for NATO or coalition warships entering the naval facilities of Gibraltar and conduct maritime security in the surrounding British territorial waters. The 2021 defence white paper indicated that henceforth, one River-class offshore patrol vessel, HMS Trent, would also be permanently based in Gibraltar for operations in the Mediterranean and in the Gulf of Guinea. However, as of 2026, the commitment to base an offshore patrol vessel out of Gibraltar is more intermittently maintained.

=== Standing NATO Maritime Group 2 ===
The Royal Navy routinely provides a single warship to the Standing NATO Maritime Group 2 (part of the NATO Response Force). The standard area of operations for the Standing NRF Maritime Group 2 is the Mediterranean Sea. In 2017, HMS Duncan deployed as flagship of the group, HM Ships Diamond and Ocean also took on the role prior to Duncan resuming her duties in early 2018 till July 2018. The latest ship to be assigned was HMS Duncan in June 2023 as flagship.

=== Special Purpose Task Group ===
In April 2016, IHS Jane's reported that the Royal Navy had formed a new marine task group, named the Special Purpose Task Group (SPTG), in December 2015. The task group is reportedly 150-strong and centred around Zulu Company of 45 Commando Royal Marines. It conducts counter-trafficking, counter-terrorism operations as well as providing support to United Kingdom Special Forces. The SPTG's first operational deployment was in January 2016 to the Mediterranean on board RFA Mounts Bay (L3008). Additional personnel from 29 Regiment Royal Artillery, 17 Port and Maritime Regiment of the Royal Logistic Corps, 24 Engineer Regiment, and 30 (Information Exploitation) Commando Royal Marines were attached to provide specialist capabilities and expertise.

=== Operation Sea Guardian ===
Ships transiting or operating in the Mediterranean will routinely be assigned in Associated Support to Operation Sea Guardian. With the forward basing of HMS Trent to Gibraltar, she has been assigned to OSG in direct support. In 2020 HMS Albion and RFA Lyme Bay have also operated in support of the operation.

=== Humanitarian missions ===
The Royal Navy remains committed to providing humanitarian assistance in the Mediterranean.

== Former ==
=== Humanitarian missions ===
When Typhoon Haiyan struck the Philippines in late 2013, the Royal Navy deployed HMS Daring and HMS Illustrious as part of the United Kingdom's humanitarian aid mission to the region (known as Operation Patwin).

During the 2004 Indian Ocean earthquake and tsunami the Royal Navy responded by deploying RFA Diligence and the frigate HMS Chatham with Westland Lynx helicopters to provide assistance.

In 2014, the Royal Navy deployed HMS Echo (a multi-role hydrographic survey ship) and HMS Tireless (a nuclear-powered fleet submarine) to search for the missing Malaysia Airlines Flight 370 in the Indian Ocean Region.

In 2020, HMS Enterprise was ordered to sail from Crete to use her hydrographic survey expertise to help to re-open the port of Beirut following the massive explosion which devastated the port and surrounding area. She also delivered humanitarian aid.

The Royal Navy provided assistance to Operation Sophia, the EU led mission to counter illegal people trafficking from Libya.

=== East of Suez ===
Previously, before the withdrawal of the United Kingdom from the European Union in 2020 ("Brexit,") the Royal Navy sent vessels to Operation Atalanta, a European Union multinational task force charged to combat Somali piracy off the Horn of Africa. For a period, the operation's headquarters was located in the United Kingdom at Northwood Headquarters, London. In November 2017 Major General Charles Stickland Royal Marines was appointed as Operation Commander of Operation Atalanta.

== See also ==
- Naval Party (Royal Navy)
- Blue-water navy
- His Majesty's Naval Service
- Merchant Navy (United Kingdom)
- Overseas military bases of the United Kingdom
