= Sarah Oakley =

Royal Navy Commodore (born 1973)

Commodore Sarah Oakley
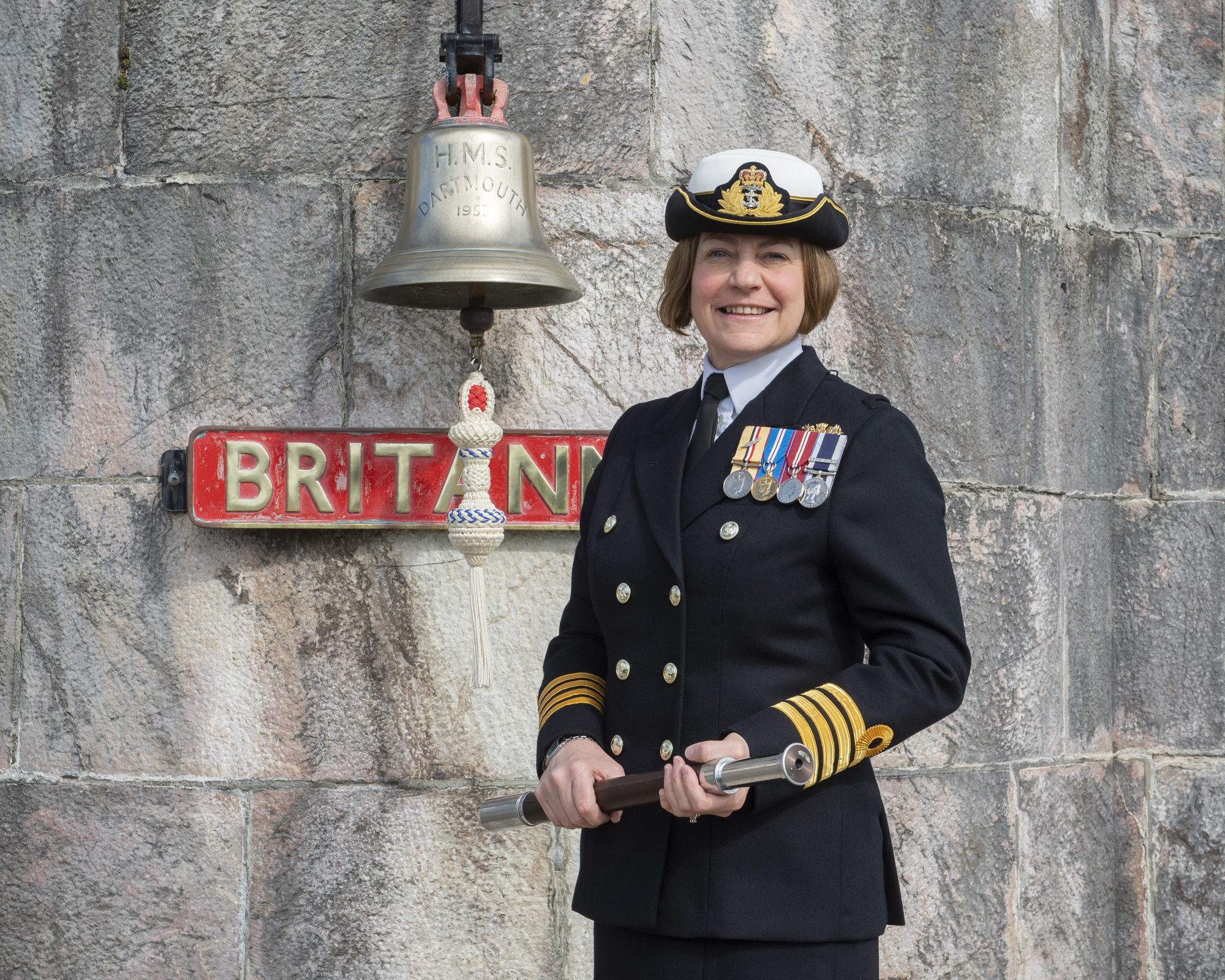
- Oakley as commanding officer of the Britannia Royal Naval College in 2022, in front of the college bell
- Born: February 1973 (age 53); Portsmouth
- Alma mater: Trinity College, Oxford; Britannia Royal Naval College
- Military career
- Allegiance: United Kingdom
- Branch: Royal Navy
- Service years: 1995–present
- Rank: Commodore
- Commands: HMS Mersey; HMS Clyde (Falkland Islands); Fishery Protection Squadron; Britannia Royal Naval College

Commodore Sarah Ellen Oakley (born February 1973) is a British Royal Navy officer, who, until December of 2023, served as the commanding officer of Britannia Royal Naval College, Dartmouth.

In the Iraq War, Oakley worked in oil platform protection. Her first command was HMS Mersey, on fisheries protection duties, her second HMS Clyde, based in the Falkland Islands. She headed the Fishery Protection Squadron from 2017 to 2019.

== Early life ==
Oakley was born in February 1973 in Portsmouth, England. She studied modern history at Trinity College, Oxford. In 1995, she joined the Britannia Royal Naval College, Dartmouth, to undertake officer training. As a graduate, she was commissioned as a Lieutenant on 13 September 1995.

In 2017, Oakley was one of sixteen former women students at Trinity College who were celebrated by the new college president Hilary Boulding in a poster and booklet entitled "Feminae Trinitatis". The others included Dame Frances Ashcroft, Siân Berry, Dame Sally Davies, Olivia Hetreed, Kate Mavor, Roma Tearne, and the opera singer Claire Booth.

== Career ==
After graduating from Dartmouth in 1996, Oakley's early career was at sea and on operational tours. Her first job was as gunnery officer in HMS Alderney, a fishery protection vessel. From there she was posted as Communications Officer in the Type 23 frigate HMS Kent, and then as navigator of another ship of the same class, HMS Norfolk.

Oakley taught at Dartmouth from 2003 to 2005 and was principal warfare and operations officer of the Type 22 frigate HMS Chatham serving in the Gulf. She was later posted to Middle East task forces dealing with terrorism and drug smuggling.

At the time of the Iraq War, Oakley was posted as Operations Officer to the Combined Task Group Iraqi Maritime. She spent seven months living on an Iraqi oil platform in the Gulf, after which her team worked on the transfer of oil platform protection duties from the Coalition forces to Iraqi control.

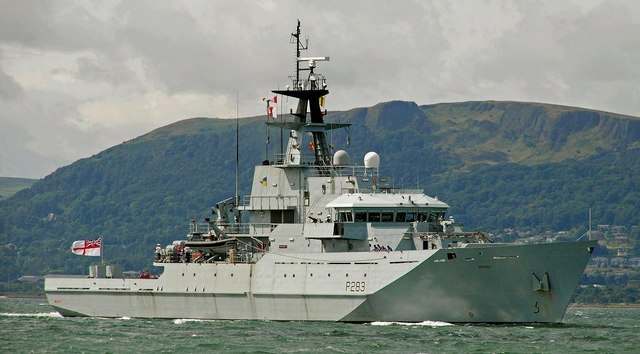
HMS Mersey

In May 2012, Oakley was given her first command, HMS Mersey, a River-class offshore patrol vessel on fisheries protection duties in home waters. She later commanded another of the class, HMS Clyde, the navy’s patrol ship based in the Falkland Islands. On 18 November 2015, Clyde helped to rescue passengers and crew from the cruise ship Le Boreal, drifting off the Falkland Islands after an engine room fire had caused passengers to take to the boats. At 21 knots, it took Clyde four hours to reach the spot, off the north end of Falkland Sound. Clyde resupplied one of the two larger lifeboats with fuel and took on people from the smaller lifeboats, then escorted them to Falkland Sound, where passengers transferred to Le Boreal's sister ship, L'Austral.

From July 2017, Oakley headed the Fishery Protection Squadron. When HMS Forth was commissioned in April 2018, Oakley commented "Forth brings with her an array of new technology, and we will be increasing the number of ships we have from four Batch One Offshore Patrol Vessels (OPVs) to five Batch Two ships. It is fabulous to watch the Navy grow again and to see that the squadron will play such an important part in its development." She relinquished command of the squadron in April 2019.

Oakley's next posting was to the Ministry of Defence, where she joined the Naval Staff Strategy team working on the Integrated Review of Security, Defence, Development and Foreign Policy, published in 2021. On 15 September 2020, Oakley was promoted to Captain. In December 2020 she was awarded the Naval Long Service and Good Conduct Medal.

In May 2022, Oakley took over command of the Britannia Royal Naval College. At the college’s passing out parade in August 2022, BBC News noted that it was the first such parade "with a female captain at the helm."

She is a Director of the Royal Navy Rugby Union.

On 24 February 2025, she was promoted to commodore.

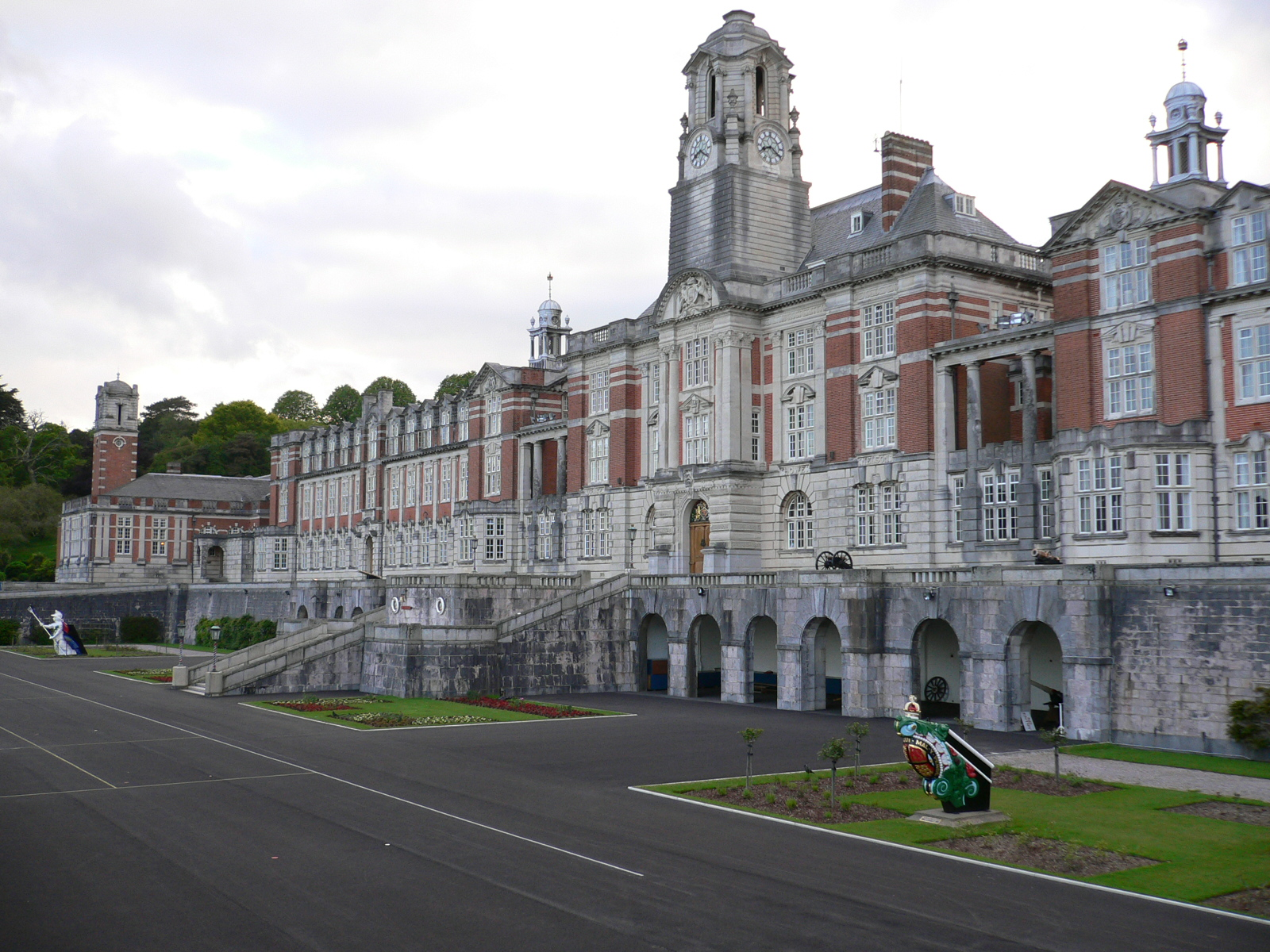
Britannia Royal Naval College

== Personal life ==
On 26 September 2020, in a COVID-19 compliant wedding at St Mary’s Church, Alverstoke, Gosport, Oakley married Group Captain Darren Thorley, Royal Air Force. Apart from the vicar and the couple, the only others present were the photographer and the verger, who acted as witnesses.

In June 2021, Oakley joined the Parochial Church Council of Alverstoke.
