= HMS Severn (P282) =

2003 River-class offshore patrol vessel of the Royal Navy

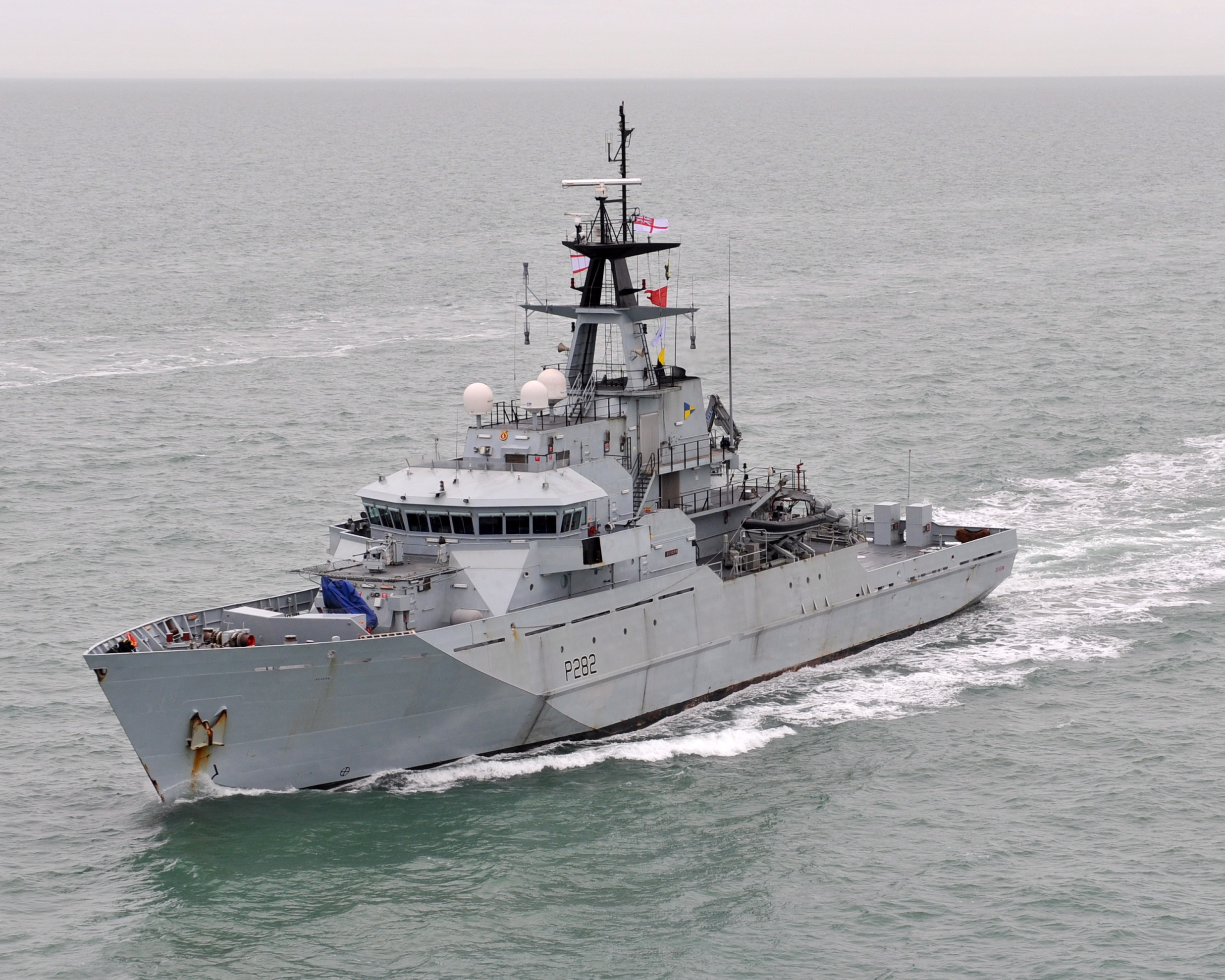
- HMS Severn, 2012

History

United Kingdom
- Name: HMS Severn
- Ordered: April 2001
- Builder: Vosper Thornycroft
- Launched: 4 December 2002
- Commissioned: 31 July 2003
- Decommissioned: 27 October 2017
- Recommissioned: 28 August 2021
- Home port: Portsmouth
- Identification: Pennant number: P282; IMO number: 9261334; MMSI number: 234623000; International call sign: GBSK
- Motto: Fides invicta triumphat (Latin: Faith unconquered triumphs)
- Nickname(s): "Lucky Severn", "Magnificent Severn"
- Honours and awards: Algiers 1816, Belgian Coast 1914, Konigsberg action 1915, Norway 1940, Atlantic 1940–41, Sicily 1943, Aegean 1943
- Status: In active service
- Badge

General characteristics
- Class & type: River-class patrol vessel
- Displacement: 1,700 t (1,700 long tons)
- Length: 79.5 m (260 ft 10 in)
- Beam: 13.5 m (44 ft 3 in)
- Draught: 3.8 m (12 ft 6 in)
- Installed power: 4,125 kW (5,532 hp) at 1,000 rpm
- Propulsion: 2 × Ruston 12RK 270 diesel engines
- Speed: 20 knots (37 km/h; 23 mph)
- Range: 5,500 nmi (10,200 km; 6,300 mi)
- Endurance: 21 days
- Boats & landing craft carried: 2 × RHIB
- Troops: 20
- Complement: 30
- Armament: 1 × Oerlikon 20 mm cannon; 2 × General purpose machine guns
- Notes: Fit with 25-tonne crane

HMS Severn is a River-class offshore patrol vessel of the Royal Navy. Named after the River Severn, the ship is the first to bear the name in 56 years. She was built by Vosper Thornycroft in Southampton, England, to serve primarily as a fishery protection unit within the United Kingdom's waters along with her two sister ships Mersey and Tyne. All three were commissioned into service in 2003 to replace the five older Island-class patrol vessels. The ship was decommissioned in 2017, but the Government decided to recommission her as part of Brexit preparedness. She returned to service in 2020 and was recommissioned into the Royal Navy on 28 August 2021.

== Construction ==
Severn was built by Vosper Thorneycroft Shipbuilding at its shipyard in Woolston, Southampton. Following construction, she was launched on 4 December 2002 as the second vessel of her class. Along with her sister ships, she was among the first vessels to be privately funded by industry and leased to the Royal Navy for five years. On expiry of this lease, the Royal Navy had the option to either purchase the vessels or return them to VT. On 31 July 2003, Severn was commissioned into the Royal Navy in a ceremony attended by her Lady Sponsor Professor Felicity Guild in Portsmouth.

== Operational history ==
Severn undertook her first fishery protection patrol in September 2003. She was also affiliated with the Welsh city of Newport during the same month and awarded the Freedom of the City in June 2006.

Between 2005 and 2006, Severn spent a total of 225 days at sea on fishery protection duties, her busiest year to date.

In September 2012, Severn was purchased by the Royal Navy, along with her sister ships, after their leases had expired.

In October 2014, it was announced that Severn would be the first River-class vessel to deploy overseas to take up the Atlantic Patrol Tasking North, a task traditionally assigned to a frigate or destroyer. Arriving in the Caribbean, Severn patrolled the waters of each British Overseas Territory in the region and was on standby to provide any support, ranging from disaster relief to tackling all forms of illicit trafficking. The ship returned to Portsmouth on 16 July 2015, having visited all of the British Overseas Territories in the region.

In December 2015, acting on intelligence from the British National Crime Agency and French DNRED, the ship intercepted the freighter MV Carib Palm off the south coast of the United Kingdom and escorted the ship to Boulogne-sur-Mer, France, where it was searched by French customs. The search uncovered 2.4 tonnes (2,400 kg) of cocaine with a street value in excess of £350 million.

In April 2017, Severn was detached from fishery protection duties to escort the Russian Navy Ropucha-class landing ship Korolyov through the English Channel.

=== Decommissioning and reactivation ===
After making what was presumed to be her final visit to her affiliated town of Newport, Wales, Severn was decommissioned at HMNB Portsmouth on 27 October 2017. In March 2018, six months since decommissioning, the Ministry of Defence announced that £12.7 million had been allocated from the EU Exit Preparedness Fund to preserve Severn and her two sister ships, should they be required to control and enforce UK waters and fisheries following the United Kingdom's withdrawal from the European Union. In November 2018, defence secretary Gavin Williamson confirmed that Severn and her sister ships would be reactivated and "forward operated" from their affiliated ports. However, the idea of forward basing the Batch 1s was reportedly later abandoned. The ships are now to be retained in service until around 2028.

=== Post-reactivation ===
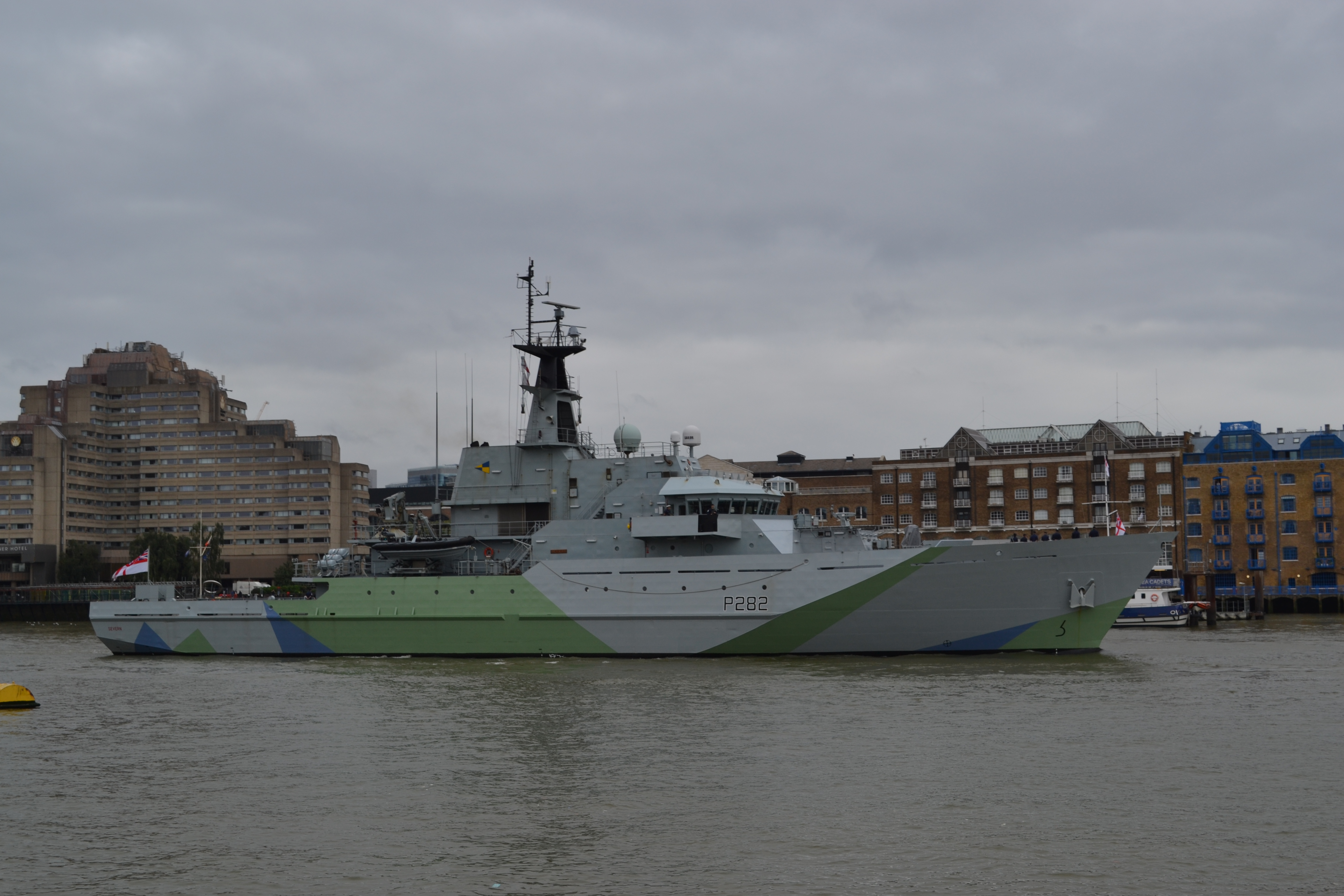
Severn in a Western Approaches camouflage scheme, August 2021

Severn underwent a refit in 2019 in preparation for her planned regeneration. Despite plans to forward-operate Severn from her affiliated port, the ship remained base ported in Portsmouth as of 4 February 2020. After passing her Operational Sea Training (OST) assessment, Severn returned to operations in July 2020, although her re-commissioning ceremony was delayed until August 2021 by the COVID pandemic. One of her first operational taskings since rejoining the fleet saw her shadowing Russian Navy destroyer Vice-Admiral Kulakov, patrol boat Vasily Bykov and their two support ships as they transited through the English Channel on 9 July 2020.

On 6 May 2021, Severn was deployed to Jersey alongside HMS Tamar, another River-class OPV, after reports that fishing boats from France would blockade the ferry Commodore Goodwill from reaching the island at 6am. This was part of a chain of events sparked by a new fishing licence scheme introduced by the Jersey authorities in alleged contravention of an agreement between the UK and the EU nations and without consultation with the French authorities.

Severn was painted in a Western Approaches camouflage scheme in time for her recommissioning ceremony alongside HMS Belfast in the Pool of London on 28 August 2021. The historic scheme is a tribute to sailors who fought in the Battle of the Atlantic. She thereafter, in her role as the navigation training ship, conducted a Fleet Navigation Officer course in mid-September, a week-long training cruise for navigation officers of larger warships.

In August 2026, together with HMS St Albans and HMS Duncan, Severn monitored the Russian ships Admiral Levchenko, Neustrashimy, General Skobelev and Sparta as they moved south from the North Sea through the English Channel.

== Affiliations ==
- City of Newport, Wales
- The King's Trust
- 104th Regiment Royal Artillery
- Dragons rugby team
- Worshipful Company of Wheelwrights

== See also ==
- River-class offshore patrol vessel
- Fishery Protection Squadron
- Royal Navy
- List of active Royal Navy ships
