= Star Sirius =

History
- Name: Star Sirius; Hua Shan

General characteristics
- Type: Tugboat

Star Sirius was a UT 734-class ocean-going anchor handling tug and supply ship berthed in Lerwick, Shetland, Scotland, throughout much of the 1970s. Today it is known as the Hua Shan.

Star Sirius had an unusual career for a tug; it was attached to the Fishery Protection Squadron in the Cod War of 1975-76 between the United Kingdom and Iceland. The tug was also involved in the Shetland oil disaster in 1993, where it had a role in attempting the rescue of the tanker MV Braer. The crew and ship were commended in the official report, which stated:

The Master and crew of the STAR SIRIUS displayed excellent seamanship and did all they possibly could to establish a tow. In the best traditions of the sea, the tugs and Lerwick lifeboat put out to sea without hesitation when asked to do so. Those who volunteered to return to the ship, especially the four who were landed on the stern, displayed bravery and determination in a very dangerous situation.
