= Overseas Patrol Squadron =

Fishery Protection Squadron Overseas Patrol Squadron
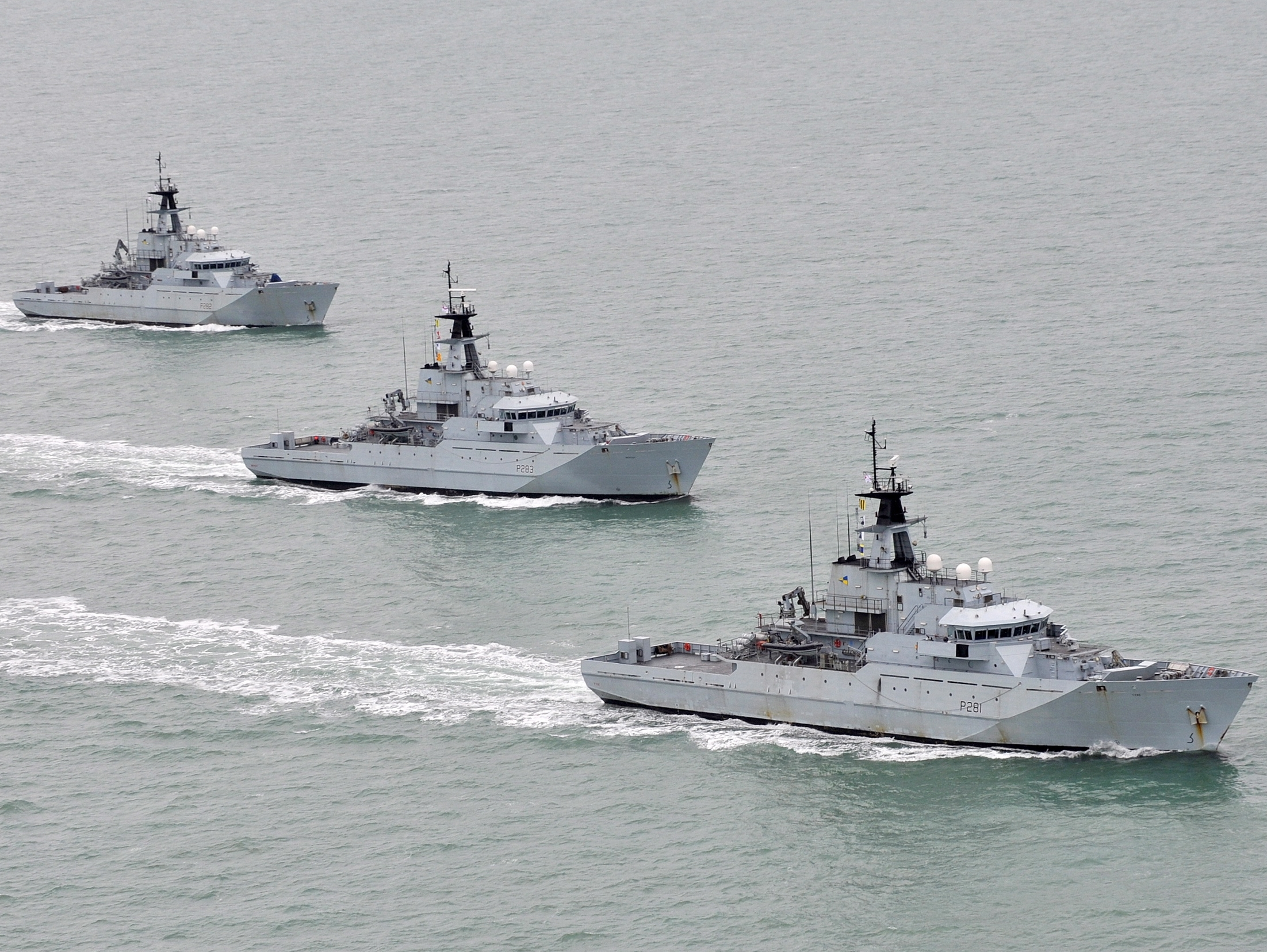
- Three River-class patrol vessels of the Overseas Patrol Squadron, HMS Severn, HMS Tyne and HMS Mersey are pictured exercising off the coast of Cornwall.
- Active: 1379 (ad-hoc); 1891 (official)
- Country: England; United Kingdom
- Branch: Royal Navy
- Type: Squadron
- Role: Fisheries protection
- Size: 8 ships as of 2021
- Home port: HMNB Portsmouth
- Ships: HMS Forth · HMS Medway · HMS Trent · HMS Tamar · HMS Spey · HMS Tyne · HMS Mersey · HMS Severn
- Engagements: Cod Wars,
- Website: Royal Navy

Commanders
- Commanding Officer: Commander Simon Pressdee
- Notable commanders: Horatio Nelson – captained HMS Albemarle in 1781

The Overseas Patrol Squadron (known as the Fishery Protection Squadron until 2020) is a front-line squadron of the Royal Navy with responsibility for patrolling the UK's Extended Fisheries Zone, both at home and around British Overseas Territories. The squadron, with headquarters at HMNB Portsmouth, is equipped with eight of the River-class patrol vessels.

The squadron is the oldest front-line squadron in the Royal Navy, and had Admiral Lord Nelson amongst those who have served in it. Originally the squadron was based on the coast of North America, Iceland and the UK, patrolling much of the North Atlantic against French and American incursions. Over the past hundred years transformed to follow a policing-oriented approach, dealing mainly with infringements by civilian fishermen. Despite this, it has maintained strong military role, as evidenced in its role in the Cod Wars of the 1960s–1970s. Vessels of the squadron fly the historic blue and yellow squared pennant of the Fishery Protection Squadron.

== Current operations ==
Royal Navy officers assigned to the Fishery Protection Squadron have a secondary role as British Sea Fisheries officers. There is a formal contract between the Ministry of Defence, the Marine Management Organisation and DEFRA that allows the squadron to conduct inspections of all fishing vessels in all UK (excepting Scottish which fall under the Marine Directorate) waters. Fishery Protection Squadron vessels can also stop British fishing vessels in international waters. In the 2008/09 contract year, the squadron spent 700 days at sea on patrol, conducting 1,102 inspections. From the inspections, 231 ships broke UK or EU law. As a result, 144 verbal warnings, 33 written warnings and 10 financial administrative penalties were handed out. The most serious breaches resulted in eight vessels being detained at UK ports. When a vessel is detained, the captain of the squadron ship contacts the Marine Management Organisation operation centre in Newcastle, which formulates a decision based on information provided to it by ships, aircraft, marine enforcement officers and fishermen, and then relays this decision back to the fishery protection ship.

In 2008, 60% of all fish caught in the EU were caught within British jurisdiction. With as many as 500 fishing ships in British waters at any one time, including dozens from EU countries, it is regarded by many as a difficult task to patrol UK fishing grounds. There is also monthly rotating aerial surveillance of the entire fishing area under call-sign "Watchdog", with aircraft provided by Direct Flight Aviation. Each aircraft transmits the identity and position of the vessel to squadron ships, which, combined with satellite data from navigational databases which allows the squadron to build a surface picture of fishing activity.

Each day, data from the inspections is sent to fisheries managers. The managers form part of several agencies which co-ordinate on a super-national level to monitor the fish stocks, negotiates fishing agreements and plan conservation measures.

=== Conflict and boarding ===
Occasionally, a fishing trawler will foul another's nets, or the sensitive border areas in the middle of the English Channel will be the focus of a dispute between trawlers. These disputes can escalate to attempted rammings, disruption of each other's fishing, shining searchlights into bridges and even firing flare guns at other trawlers. In these circumstances ships of the squadron are required to separate the trawlers and act as an informal arbitrator in the dispute to prevent further conflict or injury. Their rules of engagement reflect this role.

When a vessel is inspected, a boarding team from the FPS ship is sent. The team is formed of a Royal Navy and British Sea Fisheries-qualified officer, an assistant boarding officer, and a small security team. The officer sent could include the commanding officer, executive officer (XO) or first lieutenant, assisted by the gunnery officer, XO's assistant or operations officer. They work together to examine documentation, ensure the fishing gear (and landed fish) are of legal size, and liaise with the FPS and MMO via radio.

== History ==
Yarmouth colliding with the Icelandic gunboat Thor, which is attempting to reach trawlers off-picture to starboard during the Third Cod War

The Fishery Protection Squadron is the oldest squadron of the Royal Navy and can be traced back to 1481, although some sources, including the Royal Navy, date it to 1379. Even before an organised navy was established, the herring fishermen in Great Yarmouth fought skirmishes with foreign fishermen, who would be hanged as pirates from the gallows at Cross Sands if caught.

=== Early history ===
During the reign of Edward IV and the Wars of the Roses, English fishermen were beginning to fish in the waters around Iceland, and the King ordered that minimal protection be provided by and paid for by levies from the fishing industry. Richard III and Henry VII continued this, but occasionally this protection was not enough: 1,200 English herring fishermen were killed in a single action by Flemish warships, and likewise the Scots often had difficulties with Dutch fishermen. Because of these and other incidents, by the 16th century it was clear that an organised force was required. A petition was put forward to the Lord High Admiral for a small bark or two. As a result, the first Fishery Protection ship was commissioned for an annual fee to the Admiralty of £100, paid for by the fishermen of Yarmouth. It took the form of a wafting ship (wafting meaning 'to convey safely' or 'to convoy'), which patrolled the North Sea fishing grounds during the herring season.

This ship was eventually replaced in 1659 by a dedicated fishery protection ship for Yarmouth, with a crew of 25 and an armament of "swords, half-pikes, muskets and an ample supply of large stones". In the 18th century a similar arrangement was brokered by Scottish fishermen from George III, also for an annual payment of £100. This amount is still paid today, although as a token gesture. Samuel Pepys was connected with Fishery Protection: he received an annual honorarium for efforts to gain similar protection on behalf of English fishermen.

Before becoming famous, Lord Nelson captained HMS Albemarle in 1781 as part of the Fishery Protection Squadron in North America, capturing the U.S. fishing schooner Harmony off the coast of Cape Cod. He took it in tow, with the master of the schooner acting as pilot for both ships for the unfamiliar shores around Boston Harbor. Once the ships were safe, he allowed the schooner to continue unimpeded, saying to the master, "You have rendered us a very essential service, and it is not the custom of English seamen to be ungrateful. In the name, therefore, and with the approbation of the officers of this ship, I return your schooner and with it this certificate of your good conduct. Farewell, and may God bless you." The certificate of good conduct protected the schooner from capture by a British ship. In return, the master gave a present to Nelson of "four sheep, some poultry, and a quantity of vegetables", which Nelson ordered to be shared amongst the sick. Even today, on Trafalgar Day, the flag officer shaves with the same cut-throat razor used by Nelson while he commanded Albemarle.

=== 19th century ===
With historical rivalries between the U.S. and Britain in North America, the fishery protection squadron in Newfoundland and the surrounding area was seen as very important. At the time, the British hugely outnumbered the Americans in terms of fishery protection vessels, with 226 guns to 31 respectively. On 5 August 1853, contingents of the U.S. and British fishery protection squadrons for the area met at Halifax, Nova Scotia for a goodwill visit. The steamer USS Princeton, carrying Commodore Shubrick and his flag, arrived under dense fog and heavy rain at 8:00 pm. Princeton saluted the citadel, and fired a 15-gun salute "for the red cross of St. George", which was displayed by Vice Admiral Sir George Seymour on HMS Cumberland. There was a minor problem when Commodore Shubrick received with a 13-gun salute; he returned the salute to the vice admiral with an equal number of guns, rather than the 15 that the vice admiral was traditionally entitled to. He believed that "a commander in chief is a commander in chief", whatever his rank. The rest of the event went without any problems, as did a similar event held at Berkeley Springs, Virginia.

At the end of May 1898, HMS Partridge and Columbine arrived at St. John's from Halifax, Nova Scotia, to form part of the fishery protection squadron for the French treaty coast. They were sighted off Trepassey by the Americans, who reported on their arrival in the New York Times. With these new arrivals and others, by the end of 1898 the entire squadron had been rebuilt with powerful, modern cruisers replacing the outdated corvettes previously seen. The squadron was rebuilt in part because of the threat of an oversized French armoured cruiser sent to the area the previous year, which was seen as a threat despite being too large to enter most of the local harbours. Two smaller ships were also sent by the French to replace local wooden transport vessels, and in Autumn a French squadron gathered at Saint Pierre and Miquelon, forcing the British government to respond by sending two extra ships to Sydney, Nova Scotia, only 18 hours steaming from St Pierre. For two weeks near the end of the year, a small scale war seemed likely, but was averted after diplomatic talks.

Ships and Vessels of War of the North American Station on 16 August 1853
| Ship/Vessel | Type | Guns |
|---|---|---|
| Leander | Ship | 50 |
| Vestal | Ship | 28 |
| Calypso | Ship | 18 |
| Media | Steamer | 6 |
| Argus | Steamer, 300 ihp (220 kW) | 6 |
| Basilisk | Steamer, 400 ihp (300 kW) | 6 |
| Devastation | Steamer | 6 |
| Rose | Steamer – hired | 2 |
| Neriey? | Cutter | 2 |
| Alice Rogers | Schooner – hired | 2 |
| Dart | Schooner – hired | 2 |
| Bomta? | Schooner – hired | 2 |
| Brisk | Steamer | 14 |
| Nerbuddar? | Brig | 12 |

==== French Shore ====
By 1900, the situation had escalated. The key issue was the French Shore, resulting from the Peace of Utrecht. The treaty allowed the French to fish along the Newfoundland coast between Cape St. John and Cape Ray, however it made no claims about whether this was an exclusive right. As a result, the two nations roughly shared the fishing grounds under an unstable joint sovereignty understanding, but the respective fishery captains were given what were described by the local press as "autocratic powers". These powers were given to the captains by the Newfoundland government, granted via yearly act of the Newfoundland Legislature. In 1900, the bill was rejected in an attempt to force the British to act over what was seen as an encroaching and overbearing French presence. The British prepared to defend the area against the three French warships sent to the area each year. Colonel T Henry McCallum was appointed as governor of the colony. McCallum had already built a reputation for organising the defence of colonies, having previously fortified Singapore and Hong Kong. Fifty men were taken aboard HMS Charybdis as part of a local naval reserve force, with the hope of expanding the force to as many as 1,000 within a few years. There were also plans to turn St. John's into a naval fortress, akin to that of Halifax, Nova Scotia.

==== Lord Astor incident ====
Tensions between Russia and the UK were heightened after the Dogger Bank incident of 1904, and on 9 May 1923 a trawler from Hull—the Lord Astor—was seized by a Soviet gunboat off the coast of Murmansk for alleged illegal fishing. The trawler was captured after the fishery protection sloop HMS Godetia returned briefly to Norway to re-coal and resupply. Godetia was soon relieved by HMS Harebell under Captain Evans, commander of the fishery protection cruiser squadron.

=== 1950s ===
HMS Welcome—from the Scottish region of the Fishery Protection Squadron—was sent to Lossiemouth on 1 June 1953, to act as reviewing ship for a "Coronation fleet review" involving about 70 fishing vessels from the ports of Hopeman, Burghead and Nairn, as well as Lossiemouth proper. A Fleet Air Arm helicopter gave a demonstration of air-sea rescue operations as part of the display.

On 17 April 1957, the Glasgow Herald reported that several East Anglian herring drifters (based at Aberdeen) were encountering trouble with Russian fisherman, who were intentionally fouling the nets of the British in the fishing grounds 40 miles off the coast of Norway. The Ocean Starlight (Yarmouth) lost 50 nets, the George Spashett (Lowestoft) lost 42, and the Ocean Sunlight (Lowestoft) lost 14. The skippers lodged complaints with the Fishery Board Officer at Aberdeen, and it was considered "possible that a fishery protection vessel may be sent".

About a year later, in April 1958, HMS Belton was sent to the northern fisheries to protect British trawlers against Russian incursions, and HMS Mariner, a fishery protection vessel, was officially handed over to the Burmese Navy to become a minesweeper and training vessel. The handover ceremony took place at the Pool of London, and was presided over by the Burmese ambassador and Earl Mountbatten.

==== First Cod War ====
The Fishery Protection Squadron played a key part in the Cod Wars of the 1950s through the 1970s. During the first war, known by the Royal Navy as Operation Whippet, two extra frigates and two minesweepers were sent to the squadron on 16 August 1958 to augment the defence against Iceland's unilateral tripling of its territorial waters. Other countries, such as West Germany, Holland and France intervened in the conflict. The squadron's task was to protect British trawlers from attacks by Icelandic trawlers and coast guard vessels. By 25 August, over 100 trawlers were on their way to fish in the area, protected by four armed ships from the Fishery Protection Squadron. All trawlers carrying children were warned to move out of the conflict area.

HMS Eastbourne—a Whitby-class frigate from the 3rd Training Squadron commanded by Lieutenant Commander R C Mayne—was transferred to fishery protection duties. It left Chatham on August 27, 1958, to keep the squadron at full strength after it had been depleted by other vessels being withdrawn for refits. Unfortunately, one day after leaving, she was forced to drop anchor off Sheerness after salt water was found in her boilers.

Hostilities began on 4 September, four days after the extension came into effect. HMS Russell reported that the Icelandic gunboat Aegir had attempted to ram her while she was escorting British trawlers in the disputed area. Two reports were received from the ship during the evening. The first, at 19:00 BST read, "Four gunboats in the area and plainly up to something. While covering trawlers from Aegir she plainly tried to ram me." The second, at 20:30 BST, read, "Russell had drawn abreast Aegir's starboard side and was steaming at 12 knots on the same course at a distance of 200ft. Intention was to shield trawlers from Aegir... Aegir sounded one short blast [signifying an intention to turn to starboard] and put wheel over. Her wake showed considerable wheel used. I had to use 20 degrees to get clear. Aegir passed close astern."

The Admiralty announced that the destroyer HMS Lagos had sailed to the area to replace HMS Hound, which had to return to the UK because of problems with her radar. The trawler Northern Foam, from Grimsby, had a boarding party of nine Icelandic officers and crew taken off her on 2 September. Before the trawler was boarded by Icelandic forces, an officer read out the punishments by megaphone to the crew.

When Big Brother [the RN escort] goes home, we will get you.

— Officer aboard Thor, to the crew of Northern Foam,

On the 16th, an attempt by ICGV Thor to board the trawler Red Lancer resulted in the Arctic Explorer—temporarily under the command of a Royal Navy Commodore who was visiting the ship at the time—coming to Red Lancer's assistance. Explorer was flanked by Lagos and Hogue, two destroyers, and forced the boarding party from Thor to retreat. Explorer was presented with the Commodore's pennant as a memento of the incident. In another incident, on 7 October, naval surgeons managed to amputate six fingers from an injured fisherman from the trawler Loch Inver. The operation was performed aboard HMS Hardy, in the officer's mess, as Iceland had forbidden sick and injured men to be landed at Icelandic ports.

By the end of the first war, the squadron was recorded to have given assistance on 360 occasions. After the war, there was some experimentation with hovercraft, which were planned to be armed with several machine guns and capable of 50 kn (58 mph; 93 km/h). Four hovercraft—with a crew of 18 each—would have been able to take on the duties of six minesweepers, each with a crew of 35. Because of the limited range and poor sea-keeping qualities of hovercraft, however, these plans were quickly abandoned in favour of regular craft.

=== 1960s ===
In 1967, the Fishery Protection Squadron consisted of three divisions:

- First or Arctic Division
  - Four Type 14 frigates: HMS Duncan, Malcolm, Keppel and Palliser. This division was responsible for patrolling northern Norway, the Faeroes, Greenland, the White Sea and the Barents Sea.
- Second or Home Division
  - Consisting of four coastal minesweepers, this division patrolled the North Sea, Irish Sea and Scottish coastal waters.
- Third or Channel Division
  - The smallest division, consisting of converted inshore minesweepers HMS Squirrel and HMS Watchful. It patrolled the English Channel, arresting poachers and illegal fishing ships from France and Belgium.

=== 1970s and the second and third Cod Wars ===
British ships involved in the third cod war, November 1975 - June 1976
| Ship | Gross tons | Crew |
|---|---|---|
| Leander | 2450 | 251 |
| Galatea | 2450 | 251 |
| Naiad | 2450 | 251 |
| Juno | 2450 | 251 |
| Andromeda | 2500 | 263 |
| Bacchante | 2500 | 263 |
| Scylla | 2500 | 263 |
| Achilles | 2500 | 263 |
| Diomede | 2500 | 263 |
| Brighton | 2380 | 235 |
| Falmouth | 2380 | 235 |
| Yarmouth | 2380 | 235 |
| Eastbourne | 2150 | 225 |
| Dundas | 1180 | 140 |
| Exmouth | 1180 | 140 |
| Gurkha | 2300 | 253 |
| Tartar | 2300 | 253 |
| Leopard | 2300 | 235 |
| Salisbury | 2170 | 237 |
| Mermaid | 2300 | 253 (est.) |
| Lowestoft | 2380 | 235 |
| Star Aquarius | 849 | 15 (est.) |
| Star Polaris | 897 | 15 (est.) |
| Star Sirius | 897 | 15 (est.) |
| Lloydsman | 2041 | 15 (est.) |
| RMAS Typhoon | 800 | 15 (est.) |
| Euroman | 1182 | 15 (est.) |
| Roysterer | 1630 | 15 |
| Statesman | 3583 | 15 (est.) |
| Rollicker | 1630 | 15 |

On 1 September 1972, Iceland again expanded her maritime exclusive economic zone, this time to 50 mi (43 nmi; 80 km). This provoked another dispute, eventually escalating to further armed conflict between the UK and Iceland. Iceland's expansion was recognised by fishermen from all nations except two: the UK, and Germany, who still fished up to 12 mi (10 nmi; 19 km) from the Icelandic coast. German trawlers, however, tended to be more interested in saithe and ocean perch rather than cod, haddock and flatfish; because of this, they tended to stick to oceanic, rather than coastal waters. As the dispute escalated, British trawler captains began to cover their names and registration numbers to avoid action from Icelandic courts; as an additional, and somewhat less effective measure some hoisted the Jolly Roger in addition to the Union Jack. The Icelandic Coastguard viewed this as a violation of international law, and took many photographs of the trawlers displaying these signs; including a picture taken on 5 September 1972 of a ship believed to be the trawler Peter Scott (H103). The Icelandic strategy involved the use of net-cutters, invented by Commander Péter Sigurǒsson, Director of the Coast Guard, with assistance from Friŏrik Teitsson from the Icelandic lighthouse institution and Tómas Sigurǒsson, who were both ironmongers. The invention—tested in 1958—was known as the trawlwire cutter; it was not used until 5 September 1972, after every Icelandic ship had been equipped with it. The ships would take a two-step approach:

1. They would inform the trawler of their violation of Icelandic law, and request them to move outside the 50-mile limit.
2. If this yielded no results, they would lower the cutter into the water, and attempt to cut the nets—worth several thousand pounds—by sailing past the stern of the trawler at right angles.

As previously mentioned, the Ægir carried out the first successful cutting on 5 September in an action against a trawler believed to be the Peter Scott, sailing under a pirate flag and a Union Jack, with its registration number and name covered. Throughout 1972, 10 trawlers had their nets cut: nine British, and one West German. For the year of 1973, this had expanded to 60 British and 14 West German trawlers; a loss of hundreds of thousands of pounds worth of nets.

A British response was inevitable given the anger of the trawler captains at the time. The captains believed that they were well within their rights to fish on what they understood to be the high seas, an assumption they interpreted from the 'interim measures of protection' issued by the International Court of Justice on 17 August 1972. As such, and in line with the ICJ's ruling, the British government endeavoured to protect British trawlers up to the 12-mile limit, provided that the total catch did not exceed 170,000 long tons (170,000 t). British trawler captains, eager to protect their nets, tried several tactics:

1. Ramming of ICG vessels by trawlers. Although technically illegal under maritime law, the trawler Aldershot rammed the Ægir on 18 October 1972, 30 mi (26 nmi; 48 km) north of Hraunhafnartangi. Brucella also tried ramming—on 28 December 1972—in an action against the Óǒinn to the east of Iceland.
2. Using two trawlers to operate one trawl net. Both trawlers would sail in line astern formation; the first would fish while the second would attempt to fend off Icelandic vessels. Unfortunately, this not only cut the number of vessels engaged in fishing in half: it was also ineffective against Icelandic vessels, as the high standard of seamanship required to steer a heavy, unwieldy trawler in tight formation in rough Atlantic seas was simply too much for a civilian fisherman.
3. The British government rented four tugs; Englishman, Irishman, Lloydsman and Statesman. These tugs were sent out with orders to protect the trawlers in the disputed area, but as the tugs were unarmed, both intentional and unintentional collisions were the only way to defend the trawlers. However, this method cost the British taxpayer a substantial amount in rent and fuel costs, and did not have the desired effect.

Because of the failure of all the above tactics, British trawlers withdrew from Icelandic waters on 17 May 1973, citing fears for their own safety and livelihoods. They informed the British government that unless the Royal Navy were sent to protect them, they would not return to fishing in that area. Two days later, on 19 May, the government acquiesced, and a number of British frigates sailed north.

==== Fishery Protection Squadron intervention ====
After 19 May, three or four British frigates, four tugs, and as many as five Royal Fleet Auxiliary vessels were in the disputed area to protect an average of 46 trawlers from Icelandic harassment. In order to keep some on station at all times, seven frigates were taken from ordinary duties to be assigned to the squadron. In addition, several Nimrod maritime patrol aircraft were sent to the area, and the total manpower assigned was in the region of 2,000 personnel. The strategy used by the British was relatively straightforward: they marked out "fishing boxes" for use by trawlers, protected by high-speed frigates at the outer edges, and with the slower tugs ready to see off any attempts by the ICG to intervene inside the boxes.

When an ICG vessel was sighted, the frigates would sail towards it and place themselves between the trawlers and the ICG vessel, sailing parallel at close range. Occasionally, because of the close manoeuvring and heavy seas, one ship would find itself across the path of another. This led to accusations of ramming between the two countries, but accounts from each side differ as to who rammed who; the British maintain that the Icelandic vessels turned and rammed them using their strengthened bows, whereas Iceland maintain that the British ships turned across their bows and immediately slowed down. Altogether, 14 'rammings' were recorded by the ICG between October 1972 and September 1973.

== Administration ==
=== Captain of Fishery Protection and Minesweeping Flotilla ===
Post holders have included:

- Captain Edward R. G. R. Evans, January 1923 – August 1925
- Captain (I) Gerald C. Dickens, August 1925 – September 1926
- Captain Malcolm L. Goldsmith, January 1929 – July 1930
- Captain Benjamin W. Barrow, July 1930 – 15 July 1932
- Captain John S. G. Fraser, July 1934 – August 1935
- Captain Victor A. C. Crutchley, May 1936 – April 1937
- Captain Ernest R. Archer, April 1937 – June 1939
- Captain E. L. Aylmer, August 1939 - 1945

=== Captain, Fishery Protection Squadron ===
Post holders included:

- Captain Anthony H. Thorold: January 1949-1950
- Captain Basil Jones: December 1951-June 1953
- Captain Frank R. Twiss: June 1953-November 1954
- Captain Alastair D. Robin: November 1954-November 1956
- Captain Edward A.S. Bailey: November 1956-November 1957
- Captain Barry J. Anderson: November 1957-July 1959
- Captain Hugo H. Bracken: July 1959-March 1961
- Captain George C. Leslie: March 1961-November 1962
- Captain Richard J. Trowbridge: November 1962-May 1964
- Captain Frank W. Watson: May 1964-July 1965
- Captain William I. Campbell: July 1965-June 1966
- Captain J. Roger S. Gerard-Pearse: June 1966-July 1968
- Captain D.G. Cooper: July 1968-June 1969
- Captain Thomas H.E. Baird: June 1969-August 1971
- Captain Geoffrey R.T. Duffay: August 1971-December 1973
- Captain John T. Tomlinson: December 1973-April 1975
- Captain Michael H. Livesay: April 1975-December 1976
- Captain Peter G.V. Dingemans: December 1976-October 1978
- Captain the Hon. Nicholas J. Hill-Norton: October 1978-July 1980
- Captain John F.S. Trinder: July 1980-October 1982
- Captain Peter G.J. Murison: October 1982-September 1984
- Captain Nicholas J. Barker: September 1984-1986
- Captain James S. Chestnutt: 1986-March 1988
- Captain Roy Harding: March 1988-?

=== Commander Fishery Protection Squadron ===
Post holders include:

- Commander Graham Lovatt 2013
- Lieutenant Commander James Reynolds, 2016–2017
- Commander Sarah Oakley 2017–2019
- Commander Simon Pressdee 2019–2020

=== Commander Overseas Patrol Squadron ===
- Commander Simon Pressdee 2020–

== See also ==
- Hired armed vessels (Royal Navy)
- Naval trawler
- Q-ship
- Royal Naval Reserve
- Auxiliary Patrol
- Royal Naval Patrol Service
- Icelandic Coast Guard
