= MV Braer =

Oil tanker which ran aground during a storm off Shetland, Scotland in 1993

Coordinates: 59°53′00″N 1°21′00″W

History

Liberia
- Name: Braer
- Owner: Braer Corporation
- Operator: Canadian Ultramar Ltd
- Builder: Oshima Shipbuilding Co Ltd, Nagasaki, Japan
- Launched: 31 May 1975
- Home port: Monrovia, Liberia
- Identification: IMO number: 7377220
- Fate: Ran aground near Quendale, Shetland, Scotland, in 1993

General characteristics
- Type: Oil tanker
- Tonnage: 89,730 DWT
- Length: 241.51 m (792 ft 4 in)
- Draft: 14.15 m (46 ft 5 in)
- Installed power: Sumitomo-Sulzer 7RND90 (20,300 bhp)
- Propulsion: Single shaft; fixed pitch propeller
- Speed: 14.5 knots (26.9 km/h; 16.7 mph)
- Crew: 34 (on last voyage)

MV Braer was an oil tanker which ran aground during a storm off Shetland, Scotland, in January 1993. The tanker spilled 84,800 tons of crude oil and 1,600 tons of heavy fuel oil into Quendale Bay. The event is considered the worst marine oil spill in Scottish history.

== Design and history ==
The MV Braer was originally launched as the Hellespont Pride and was constructed by Oshima Shipbuilding Company in 1975. The Braer was originally owned by Tucana Shipping Company of Singapore before being purchased by the Hancock Shipping Company registered in Monrovia when she was renamed Brae Trader. She was named Braer when she was acquired by the Braer Corporation in 1990.

== Reason for ship's loss ==
During the enquiry after the ship's loss, it was stated that the ship lost power due to seawater contamination of the ship's heavy fuel oil on 3 January. This occurred after a pipeline on the deck broke loose, allowing seawater to enter the vessel's bunker tanks via broken air vents. The loss of power caused the crew to lose control of the ship during a storm.

== Timeline ==
At 05:19 on 5 January 1993, Lerwick coastguard were advised that the tanker, Braer, en route from Bergen, Norway to Quebec, Canada, laden with 85,000 tonnes of Norwegian Gullfaks crude oil, had lost engine power but was in no immediate danger. Her estimated position then was 10 nautical miles (19 km) south of Sumburgh Head, although the initial position given to the coastguards was off by 5 nautical miles (9 km), and she was drifting in predominantly southwesterly winds of 24 to 33 metre per second (Beaufort scale 10–11). The coastguard alerted rescue helicopters from Sumburgh and RAF Lossiemouth, and made enquiries about the availability of local tugs. At the Coast Guard's suggestion, the master agreed that non-essential personnel should be removed from the vessel—14 of the 34 crew were taken off by the coastguard helicopter from Sumburgh at 08:25.

At 08:50 it was feared that the ship would run aground near Horse Island, and the experience of Aegean Sea which burst into flames shortly after grounding led the coastguard to persuade the Greek Captain Alexandros S. Gkelis to abandon ship. However, because of strong northwest local currents, Braer moved against the prevailing wind and missed Horse Island, drifting towards Quendale Bay.

With the arrival on scene of the anchor handling vessel Star Sirius, it was decided to attempt to establish a tow. There was a breakdown in communication between the local police and the coastguards which caused a 90-minute delay at this point. However the master and some personnel were then taken out by helicopter and were put back on board the vessel. Efforts to attach a heaving line were unsuccessful, and at 11:19 the vessel was confirmed as being grounded at Garths Ness, with oil being seen to flow out into the sea from the moment of impact. At this time, the would-be rescue team were rescued by the helicopter.

== Environmental consequences ==
The crude Braer was carrying was lighter and more easily dispersible than other North Sea crude oils. This, in combination with strong storms in Shetland (naturally dispersing the oil by wave action and evaporation), is said to have prevented the event from having greater impacts on the shore. However, the spill affected the fishing sector, with fishing activities prohibited for more than six years due to high toxins affecting fish and crustaceans. At least 1,500 birds were killed, and it is estimated that up to one quarter of the area's grey seal population was affected. The higher percentage of volatile compounds may relate to the high rate of respiratory distress noted in seals in the area.

The following is a brief account of the spread and eventual dispersion of the oil.

Location of the wreck off the Shetland Islands

=== Response ===
Initially the local authorities informed the UK Maritime and Coastguard Agency Marine Pollution Control Unit, the Director of Marine Emergencies Operation and various UK Ministries. In order to lead the response they set up a Joint Response Centre (made up of local councillors, managers, environmentalists and technicians). There were fears that the oil could set off an explosion and the area around Quendale beach was closed off. Evacuation of residents from housing in the area was considered if pollution levels became too high but not put into action. Aircraft were immediately ordered to monitor the spread of the oil and to spray chemical dispersants on the oil. Alternative methods of dispersing the oil were considered (mechanical methods or burning) but were rejected because they were thought to be ineffective in the bad weather or dangerous. Authorisation to use dispersant sprays was obtained from the Marine Emergencies Operation, Scottish Natural Heritage and the Scottish Office Agriculture and Fisheries Department. Spraying of dispersants on the oil started on day two. Solo, a Greenpeace ship also arrived in Shetland on day two with facilities to help mammals and birds affected by the oil spill. 23,000 sheep were removed from the area.

Fuelled by intense media coverage over the new year holiday when news is in short supply, initial response also focused on wildlife rescue. The various local organisations that are involved in the wildlife aspects of a large oil spill had for some time planned how to cope with such events. Immediately after Braer grounded, these organisations (under the umbrella of the WRCC), representing the SIC, Sullom Voe Terminal (SVT), Scottish Natural Heritage (SNH), Shetland Oil Terminal Environmental Advisory Group (SOTEAG), Royal Society for the Protection of Birds (RSPB), Scottish Society for Prevention of Cruelty to Animals (SSPCA), and the Hillswick Wildlife Sanctuary, came together to initiate a response at the Boddam Scout hut (it having been identified as a suitable wildlife response "command centre"). From there, they directed all activities relating to wildlife affected by the spill; which was channelled into three categories:

1. Organise teams to walk beaches and collect oiled birds and other animals
2. Deal with live oiled birds and mammals
3. Record and store dead birds and mammals

The volunteer response from the people of Shetland to walk beaches was excellent, especially considering the appalling weather conditions during much of January. From outside Shetland came several "walk-in" helpers, a team of five from the Scottish Wildlife Trust and two from British Gas, while some staff members from organisations such as the RSPB came north and helped out both on beaches and in key duties at the WRC. Volunteers were organised into teams of at least two and collected all dead and any live birds and animals from accessible beaches. Where possible, beaches were checked at least twice per day.

During the first few days of the spill, efforts were concentrated in the south-west Mainland, from Sandwick round to Maywick; but the northward spread of the oil up the west side meant that, by 12 January, surveys had been extended to cover the longer stretches of accessible coastline in the Burra, Scalloway, Whiteness and Weisdale areas, and westwards as far as Culswick. In total, all the accessible beaches from Leebitten (east Mainland) round Sumburgh to the Dale of Walls (west Mainland) were checked during the course of the spill, which prompted the setting up of a forward "command post" at Holmsgarth, Lerwick from where surveys of the "northern" coasts were co-ordinated.

By 26 January focus had shifted from wildlife rescue to human health, economic and ecological issues, and the Secretary of State for Scotland announced the establishment of an Ecological Steering Group to co-ordinate the environmental assessment. Professor William Ritchie of Aberdeen University served as its chair, and Mark O'Sullivan of the Scottish Office as its secretary. The members were David Bedborough, Chief Scientist of the Marine Pollution Control Unit in The Coastguard Agency; Dr John Davies of the Marine Laboratory, Aberdeen; David Dickson of the Scottish Office; Martin Hall the Director of Environmental Services of Shetland Islands Council; Robert Hepworth of the Department of the Environment; Dr Paul Kingston of Heriot-Watt University; Dr John Miles, the Ecological Adviser to the Scottish Office; Dr Patricia Monaghan, a zoologist from Glasgow University; Bobby Tulloch MBE, a Shetland naturalist and author; Professor Michael Usher, the Chief Scientific Adviser to Scottish Natural Heritage.

The total number of dead birds recovered from beaches during January was 1,538. Of these, 805 (52%) were found between Sumburgh Head and Garths Ness. Only 60 corpses (3.8%) were collected from beaches along the east coast, with the remainder scattered fairly evenly along the west coast between Spiggie and Sandsound, with smaller numbers further north and west to Dale. During the first week of the spill (6–12 January), very few dead birds were found away from the area between Scatness and St. Ollie's Isle, and even in this area the majority were collected from the West Voe of Sumburgh, Scatness and Quendale. In the second week (13–19 January), fewer corpses were collected close to Braer, and there was a corresponding increase in the number collected from further north on the west coast. This trend continued into the third week (20–26 January), but, by the fourth week (27–31 January), very few birds were found anywhere and there was no obvious tendency for more to be found in one area than another.

In any oil spill, it is difficult to estimate the proportion of the actual mortality found on beach surveys, and several factors made that even harder in the case of Braer. The almost constant storms made it difficult to search shorelines as thoroughly as could have been done in calmer weather, and also made it much more difficult to catch live birds, some of which were driven inland by the wind. The weather also prevented systematic searches of the islands in Quendale Bay and further north, where birds were likely to have come ashore and died, while the exceptionally high tides at the time also compounded the problem, especially if they occurred in the middle of the day. For several days, beaches were completely under water for the 6–7 hours of daylight available for surveys, with unreachable corpses moving back and forth in the surf. When tides did drop, many beaches had been completely rearranged, or buried in tonnes of kelp by the heavy seas.

At Scatness, dead shags had been driven deep into cracks and crevices in the rocks or buried beneath the kelp, and sometimes just parts of a bird were found. In addition, the many small boulder beaches along the south-west coast were too inaccessible to be checked at all, several corpses were likely to have been scavenged by the larger gulls, and an unknown but almost certainly significant proportion will have been swept out to sea.

The Steering Group published an interim report in May 1993 and a final report in 1994, which contains details of the monitoring strategy and methods. It found that:

1. by the end of July 1993 farmed salmon showed no taint and there was no sign of resuspension of sediment that might contaminate fish in cages,
2. for all species of wild fish contamination fell rapidly, and in April 1993 the ban on fishing had been correctly lifted,
3. in May 1994 there had still been evidence of low levels of contamination in some shellfish and the prohibition on fishing at that time had remained correct,
4. residual oil then lodged in the sea bed west and south-east of Shetland showed no evidence of any effects on whitefish or shellfish,
5. there was no change in the distribution or population of sandeels, an important indicator species and food chain component,
6. there were disturbances to populations of benthic communities in areas of fine sediment affected by oil, but not such as significantly to disrupt community structures, and insignificant effects on communities in the coastal macrobenthos,
7. there was little evidence of hydrocarbon contamination in near-shore and intertidal coastal areas,
8. any impact on rocky shores was small and limited to coastlines near the wreck,
9. Up to 25% of the local grey seal population may have been impacted, with hundreds of animals showing signs of respiratory distress,
10. Over 200 oiled birds were brought in for rehabilitation, with possibly thousands impacted.
11. effects on land were very constrained (e.g. effects on bryophytes were confined to a 10 metre band between Garths Wick and Garths Ness), and any effects on grazing land, soils, livestock or plants were very slight and short-lived.

The Steering Group concluded that although there were local and limited adverse effects the overall impact of the spill had been minimal.

=== Designation under the Protection of Wrecks Act 1973 ===
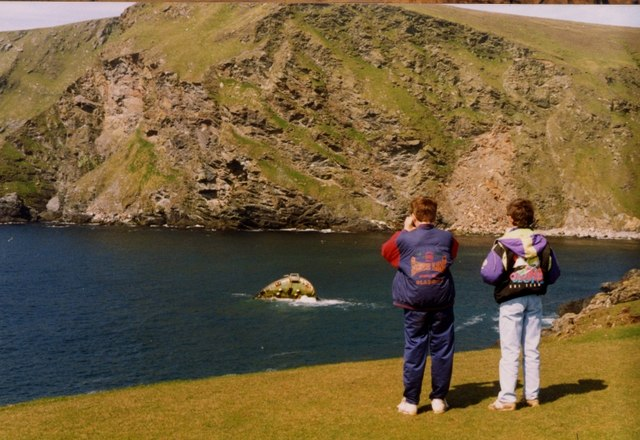
Bow of the Braer visible in June 1993

A designation under section 2 of the Protection of Wrecks Act was made on 5 February 1993. This part of the act is used to designate wrecks categorised as dangerous. It was only the second time that section 2 of the Act was used to designate a wreck site, and the designation was imposed because of the presence of the oil. The designation was revoked on 7 October 1994 following dispersal of the oil.

The wreck of the Braer remained in an exposed position, and finally broke apart and sank on 11 January. The upturned bow remained visible for seven years before sinking. The site of the Braer is on the west coast of Garths Ness, an area with shallow water and very exposed to prevailing winds; so the wreckage is smashed flat in less than 10 metres (33 ft) of water with little recognisable remaining.

== Memorial ==
In 1995, British folk-rock band Fairport Convention released the album Jewel in the Crown, including "The Islands" by Ralph McTell and Maartin Allcock. The song commemorates the wreck of Braer, personifying the sea as the protector of the Shetland Islands.

== See also ==
- List of oil spills
- Amoco Cadiz
- Exxon Valdez
- Torrey Canyon
