= HMS Tyne (P281) =

2003 River-class offshore patrol vessel of the Royal Navy

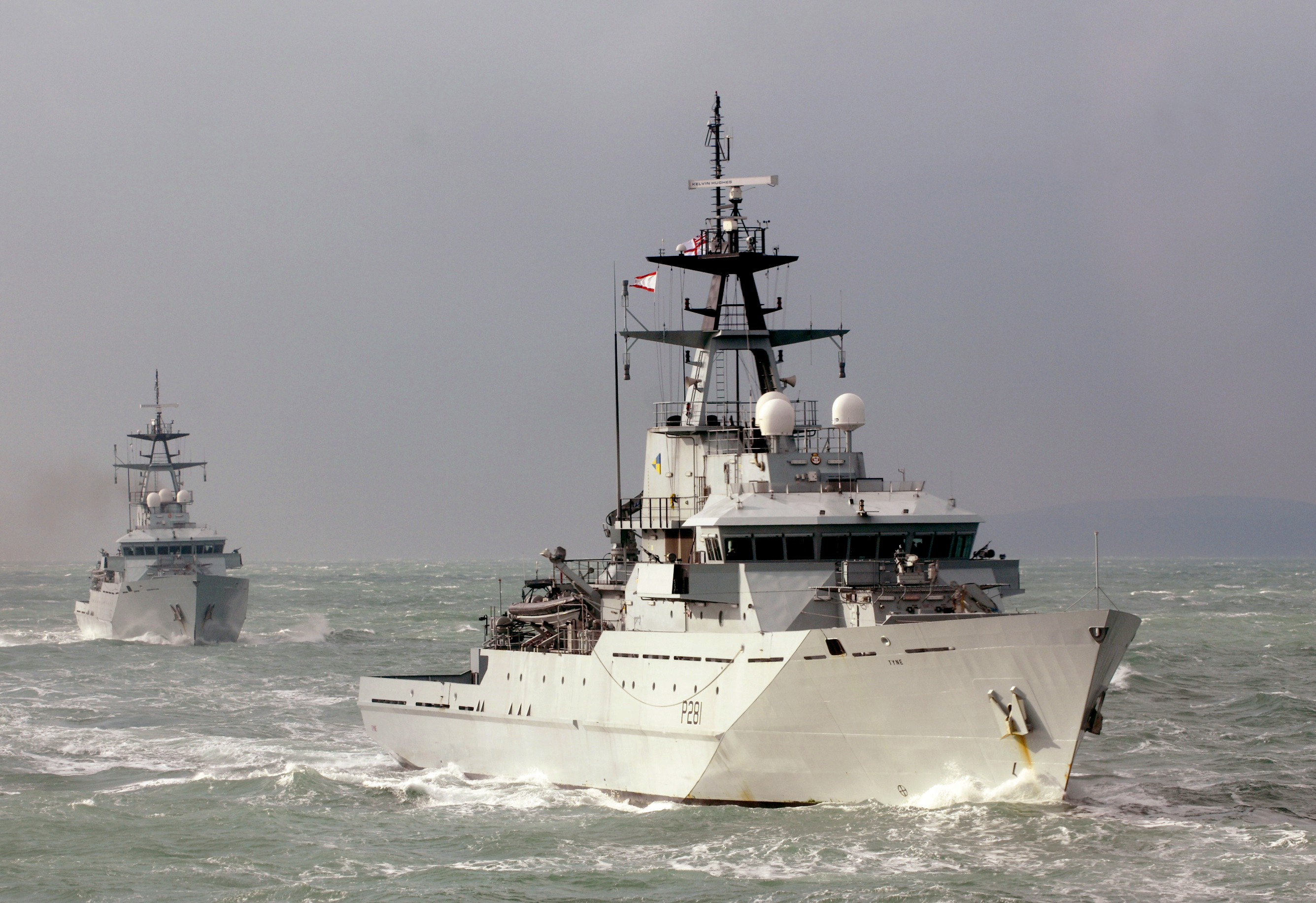
- HMS Tyne on exercise in 2011

History

United Kingdom
- Name: HMS Tyne
- Namesake: River Tyne
- Ordered: April 2001
- Builder: Vosper Thornycroft
- Launched: 1 July 2002
- Commissioned: 4 July 2003
- Home port: Portsmouth
- Identification: Pennant number: P281; IMO number: 9261322; MMSI number: 234605000; International call sign: GAAD
- Status: In active service
- Badge

General characteristics
- Class & type: River-class patrol vessel
- Displacement: 1,700 tonnes
- Length: 79.5 m (260 ft 10 in)
- Beam: 13.5 m (44 ft 3 in)
- Draught: 3.8 m (12 ft 6 in)
- Installed power: 4,125 kW (5,532 hp) at 1,000 rpm
- Propulsion: Two Ruston 12RK 270 diesel engines
- Speed: 20 knots (37 km/h; 23 mph)
- Range: 5,500 nmi (10,200 km; 6,300 mi)
- Endurance: 21 days
- Boats & landing craft carried: 2 × rigid inflatable boats
- Troops: 20
- Complement: 30
- Armament: 1 × Oerlikon 20 mm cannon; 2 × General purpose machine guns
- Notes: Fit with 25-tonne crane

HMS Tyne is a River-class offshore patrol vessel built by Vosper Thornycroft in Southampton for the Royal Navy to serve as a fishery protection unit within the United Kingdom's waters along with her two sister ships Mersey and Severn. All three were commissioned into service in 2003 to replace the five older Island-class patrol vessels.

Tyne is the sixth Royal Navy ship to carry the name and was featured in the first episode of the BBC series Empire of the Seas, "How the Navy Forged the Modern World, Heart of Oak", presented by Dan Snow.

== Construction ==
The first of her class, Tyne was built by Vosper Thornycroft at its Woolston, Southampton shipyard in 2001. Following construction, she was launched on 1 July 2002 with an expected handover to the Royal Navy's Fishery Protection Squadron by November. By January 2003, she had completed the first stage of her sea trials in the Solent.

The first three River-class ships Tyne, Severn and Mersey were the first ever privately funded vessels received by the Royal Navy on charter. They were chartered for five years, after which the Ministry of Defence could either purchase them outright or return them to VT.

== Operational history ==
Tyne made her first operational fishery protection patrol between January and February 2003. In January 2004, having been on fishery protection duties, she helped coordinate a search and rescue following the capsizing of French fishing trawler Bugaled Breizh off the coast of Cornwall.

In September 2012, the Royal Navy purchased Tyne and her sister ships Severn and Mersey, having previously operated them on lease. They had a remaining service life of 11 years.

Aside from her day-to-day fishery protection duties, Tyne has occasionally been called upon to undertake escort roles in the UK Area of Interest. Two such examples occurred in the autumn of 2016 when she was twice assigned to escort Russian warships through the English Channel.

In March 2017, it was announced that Tyne would be crewed by personnel usually assigned to Hunt-class mine countermeasures vessels to allow her regular crew to transfer to the Batch 2 River-class HMS Forth in build in Glasgow.

=== Decommissioning and reactivation ===
In March 2018, Parliamentary Under-Secretary for Defence Guto Bebb revealed that £12.7M had been allocated from the EU Exit Preparedness Fund to preserve Tyne and her two Batch 1 sister ships, should they be required to control and enforce UK waters and fisheries following the United Kingdom's withdrawal from the European Union. In May 2018, the ship entered Portsmouth to be decommissioned on 24 May 2018. However, the ship was still flying the White Ensign in July 2018, and therefore still in active service. The Royal Navy subsequently clarified that the ship had not been decommissioned due to delays in the delivery of her planned successor, HMS Forth. On 22 November 2018, Defence Secretary Gavin Williamson further clarified that Tyne and her two Batch 1 sister ships would be retained in service and forward-operated from their affiliated rivers. The intention to forward-base the Batch 1s was later abandoned, with the ships to be retained in service until around 2028.

=== Post-reactivation ===
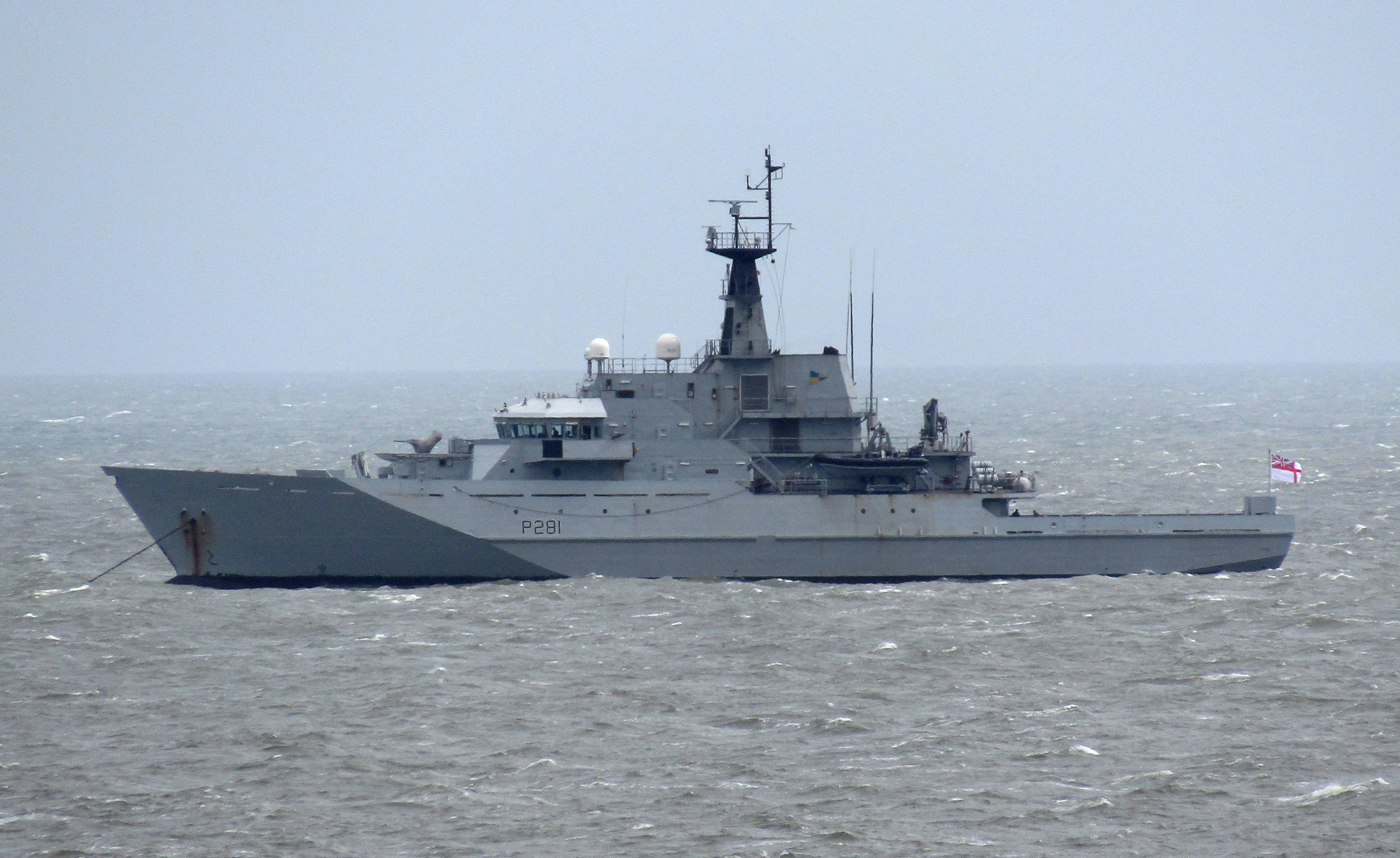
Tyne off the coast of Norfolk, England in May 2020.

Despite plans to station Tyne on her affiliated river, the ship remained base-ported in Portsmouth as of February 2020. Between 1 January 2014 and 30 September 2019, she had spent a total of 1,081 days at sea. In December, she was tasked with shadowing the Russian Navy Smolnyy-class training ship Perekop through the English Channel.

In June 2021, Tyne, along with Northumberland and Tamar, was deployed off the Cornish coast to provide security for the 2021 G7 summit.

In January 2025, Tyne, was reported to be monitoring Russian spy ship Yantar in the North Sea along with Somerset.

In July 2026, Tyne, was shadowing the Russian frigate Neustrashimy when the latter conducted a live fire exercise 40 miles off south of Plymouth.

== Affiliations ==
Her affiliations included North Tyneside Council, St Catherines Primary School, Hadrian Special Needs Primary School, TS Caledonia (Peterhead Sea Cadets unit), TS Tyne (Newburn Sea Cadets unit), and the Worshipful Company of Butchers.
