= HMS Mersey (P283) =

2003 River-class offshore patrol vessel of the Royal Navy

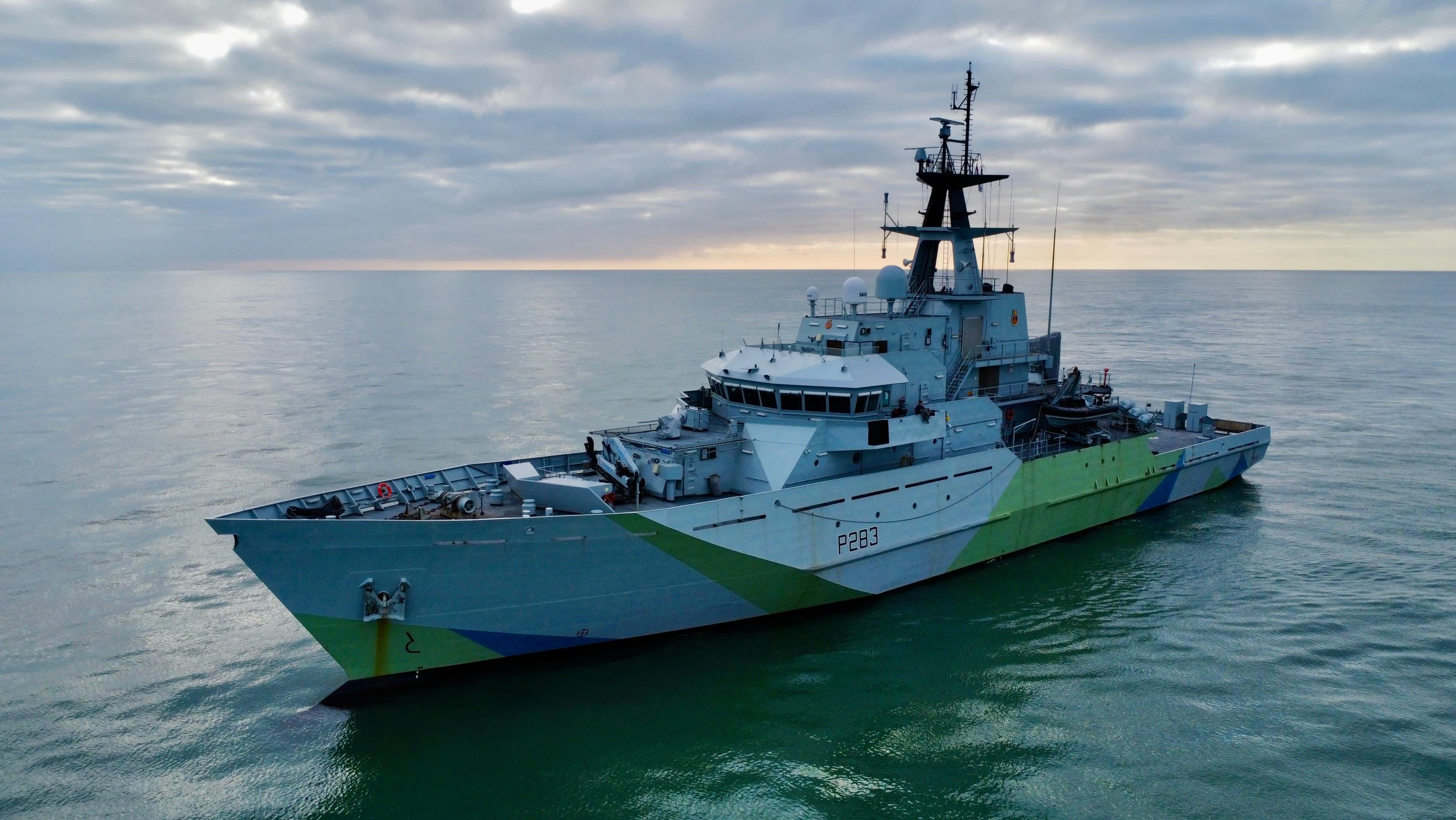
- HMS Mersey, 2024

History

United Kingdom
- Name: HMS Mersey
- Operator: Royal Navy
- Ordered: April 2001
- Builder: Vosper Thornycroft
- Launched: 14 June 2003
- Sponsored by: Mrs Jennie Reeve
- Commissioned: 28 November 2003
- Home port: HMNB Portsmouth
- Identification: Pennant number: P283; IMO number: 9261346; MMSI number: 234637000; Maritime call sign: GBSY
- Status: In active service
- Badge

General characteristics
- Class & type: River-class patrol vessel
- Displacement: 1,700 tonnes (1,700 long tons)
- Length: 79.5 m (260 ft 10 in)
- Beam: 13.5 m (44 ft 3 in)
- Draught: 3.8 m (12 ft 6 in)
- Installed power: 4,125 kW (5,532 hp) at 1,000 rpm
- Propulsion: 2 × Ruston 12RK 270 diesel engines
- Speed: 20 knots (37 km/h; 23 mph)
- Range: 5,500 nmi (10,200 km; 6,300 mi)
- Endurance: 21 days
- Boats & landing craft carried: Two rigid inflatable boats
- Complement: 30
- Armament: 1 × Oerlikon 20 mm cannon; 2 × General purpose machine guns
- Notes: Fitted with 25-tonne crane

HMS Mersey is a River-class offshore patrol vessel of the British Royal Navy. Named after the River Mersey, she is the fifth RN vessel to carry the name and the first to be named Mersey in 84 years. Various tenders were renamed Mersey during their service with Mersey Division Royal Naval Reserve (HMS Eaglet) between the early 1950s and late 1970s.

HMS Mersey was built by Vosper Thornycroft in Southampton, England to serve as a fishery protection vessel within the United Kingdom's waters along with her two sister ships Tyne and Severn. All three were commissioned into service in 2003 to replace the five older Island-class patrol vessels. She was commissioned into the Royal Navy on 28 November 2003. At that time, Mersey was not expected to commence duties until February 2004.

Mersey was the last Royal Navy ship to be launched from Vosper Thornycroft at its Woolston shipyard; Jennie Reeve, wife of Rear-Admiral Jonathon Reeve, Chief of Fleet Support, was the ship's sponsor.

== Operational history ==
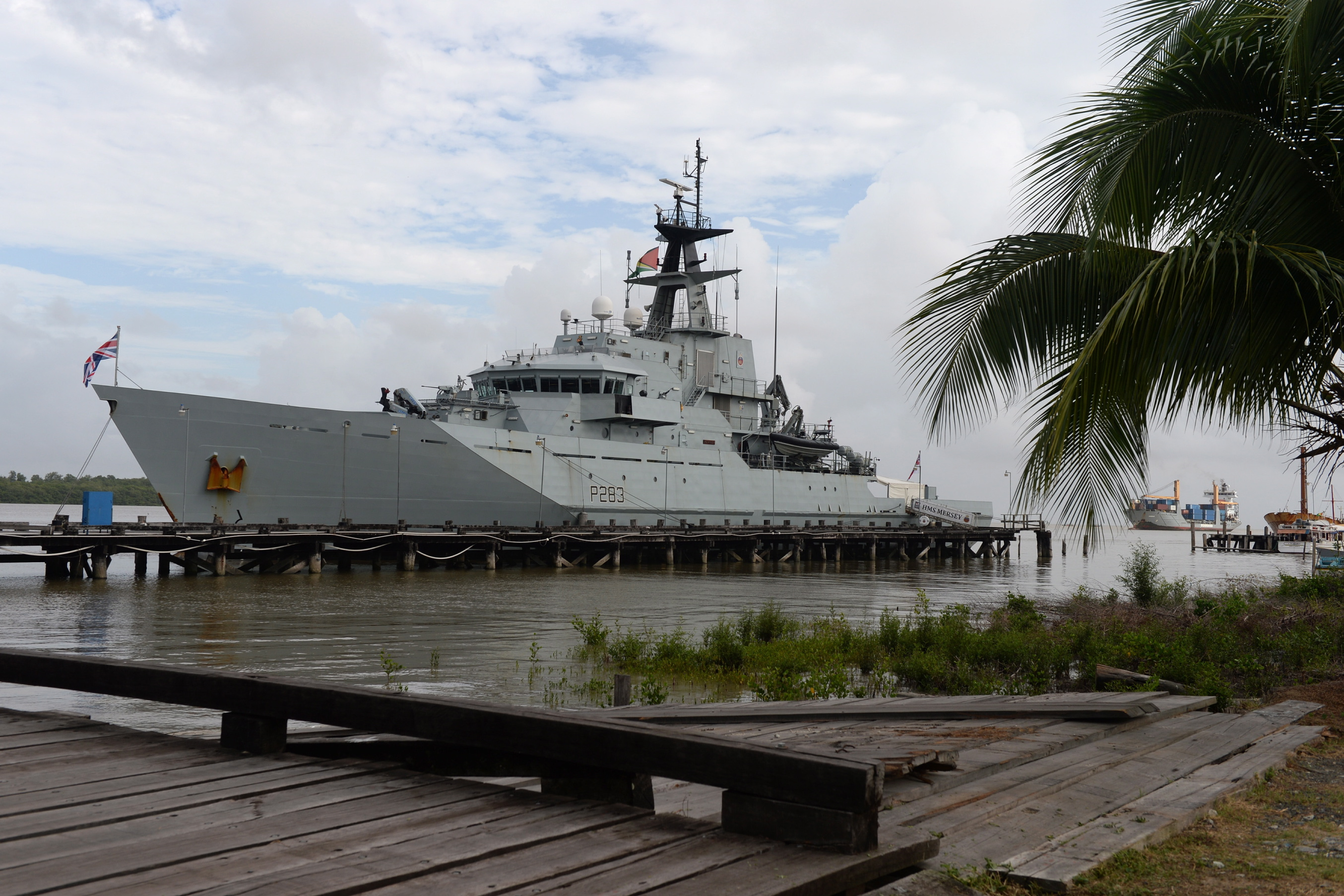
Visiting Guyana in March 2016

For the first thirteen years of operation, Mersey carried out fishery protection duties around the United Kingdom.

In May 2012, Mersey became the first command of Sarah Oakley.

In October 2013, Mersey was dry docked in Falmouth.

In January 2016, Mersey became the second River-class OPV to be deployed to the Caribbean Sea following on from her sister Severn in 2015. In May 2016, Mersey was dry docked in Martinique as part of her mid-deployment maintenance period. By July, Mersey had been relieved by RFA Wave Knight and was deployed on migrant patrols in the Aegean via a port call in Gibraltar. Mersey returned to Portsmouth on 10 February 2017 after 13 months away to resume her fishery protection duties.

On 3 January 2019, Defence Secretary Gavin Williamson confirmed that HMS Mersey has been deployed to assist UK and French authorities with illegal migrant crossings in the English Channel.

== Extended service ==
On 24 April 2017, in a written answer to a question raised by Sir Nicholas Soames, Parliamentary Under-Secretary for Defence Harriett Baldwin stated that Mersey would be decommissioned in 2019.

In March 2018, Baldwin's successor Guto Bebb revealed that £12.7M had been allocated from the EU Exit Preparedness Fund to preserve the three Batch 1 ships, should they be needed to control and enforce UK waters and fisheries following the United Kingdom's withdrawal from the European Union.

On 22 November 2018, Defence Secretary Gavin Williamson announced that three Batch 1 River-class ships would be retained in service and forward operated from their affiliated ports. However, the idea of forward basing the Batch 1s was reportedly later abandoned. The ships are now to be retained in service until around 2028. In late 2023, Mersey began a major refit. Mersey completed an eight-month upkeep period in July 2024.

== Affiliations ==
- HMS Eaglet
- TS Ardent
- The Worshipful Company of Arbitrators

== Freedom of Borough ==
- Metropolitan Borough of Sefton - 13 April 2023.
