= 1978 Special Honours =

British government recognitions

As part of the British honours system, Special Honours are issued at the Monarch's pleasure at any given time. The Special Honours refer to the awards made within royal prerogative, operational honours and other honours awarded outside the New Years Honours and Birthday Honours.

== Life peer ==
=== Baronesses ===
- Nora Ratcliff, Mrs. David. Member of Cambridgeshire County Council.

=== Barons ===
- Aubrey Leland Oakes Buxton, M.C., D.L. Director, Anglia Television Ltd. ; Member, Royal Commission on Environmental Pollution 1970-1974.
- Sir Francis Arthur Cockfield. Lately Chairman, Price Commission.
- Alexander Mitchell Donnet, C.B.E. National Chairman 1970-1976 and Scottish Regional Secretary since 1959, National Union of General and Municipal Workers. Formerly Member, General Council of the Trades Union Congress 1972-1976.
- David Thomas Gruffydd Evans. President, Liberal Party; Member, Merseyside County Council.
- John Charles Hatch. Lecturer. Formerly Head of Commonwealth Department, Labour Party Headquarters.
- William Howie. Member of Parliament for Luton 1963-1970; Lord Commissioner of the Treasury 1966-1967; Comptroller, H.M. Household 1967-1968; Vice-Chairman, Parliamentary Labour Party
- Jeremy Nicolas Hutchinson, Q.C. Formerly Recorder of Bath; Member, Committee on Immigration Appeals.
- John Denis Leonard, O.B.E. Lately Chairman, South Glamorgan County Council; Lately Member, Cardiff City Council.
- Victor Mishcon, D.L. Member, London County Council 1946-1965. Member, Greater London Council 1965-1967. Member, National Theatre Board.
- John Derek Page. Member of Parliament for King's Lynn Division of Norfolk 1964-1970. Director, Cambridge Chemical Company Ltd.
- Cyril Thomas Howe Plant, C.B.E. General Secretary, Inland Revenue Staff Federation 1960-1976. Lately Member, Community Relations Commission; Race Relations Board. Member, Monopolies and Mergers Commission.
- The Right Honourable Sir Peter Anthony Grayson Rawlinson, Q.C., M.P. Member of Parliament for Epsom 1955-1974 and for Epsom and Ewell since 1974. Attorney General 1970-1974.
- William Henry Sefton. Chairman, Runcorn Development Corporation. Member, Merseyside County Council.
- The Right Honourable Sir Arthur Christopher John Soames, G.C.M.G., G.C.V.O., C.B.E. Lately Vice-President, Commission of the European Communities. H.M. Ambassador to France 1968-1972. Minister of Agriculture, Fisheries and Food 1960- 1964. Member of Parliament for Bedford Division of Bedfordshire 1950-1966.
- Thomas Taylor, C.B.E. Member, North West Region Economic Planning Council. Lately Member, Blackburn Borough Council.

== George Cross (GC) ==
- Michael Kenneth Pratt, Constable, Victoria Police Force.

== Most Excellent Order of the British Empire ==
=== Commander of the Order of the British Empire (CBE) ===
- Brigadier John Richard Alexander Macmillan, O.B.E. (431870), late The Gordon Highlanders.
- Brigadier Andrew Dewe Myrtle, M.B.E. (430393), late The King's Own Scottish Borderers.

=== Officer of the Order of the British Empire (OBE) ===
- Lieutenant-Colonel Roger Charles Ayers (426813), Royal Regiment of Artillery.
- Lieutenant-Colonel Geoffrey John Brierley, M.B.E. (443405), The Parachute Regiment.
- Lieutenant Colonel Ewen Duncan Cameron (439964), The Black Watch (Royal Highland Regiment).
- Lieutenant Colonel Colin Frederick Eaton (437053), Royal Tank Regiment.
- Lieutenant-Colonel Wilfred Roy Greenwood (442229), Royal Army Educational Corps.
- Lieutenant-Colonel Peter Walter Ernest Istead (434900), Royal Army Ordnance Corps.
- Lieutenant Colonel Garry Dene Johnson, M.B.E., M.C. (448155), The Royal Green Jackets.
- Lieutenant-Colonel David James St. John Loftus (437103), 13th/18th Royal Hussars (Queen Mary's Own).
- Lieutenant Colonel Daniel Robert George Seidl (433233), The Royal Regiment of Fusiliers.

=== Member of the Order of the British Empire (MBE) ===
- Major (Quartermaster) Edward Morley (480126), Royal Corps of Transport.
- Major Maurice Tudor (486894), General List.

== Imperial Service Medal (ISM) ==
- George Addison, Storeman Senior, Ministry of Defence.
- William Thomas Agnew, Engine Fitter Chargehand, Ministry of Defence.
- Peter Aguilera, Telephone Operator Supervisor, Ministry of Defence.
- Michael Olatunji Akintaro, Hot Water Fitter, Department of the Environment.
- Dennis Sidney George Alder, Fitter Motor Transport, Ministry of Defence.
- Thomas Tedford Alexander, Fitter Airframe, Ministry of Defence.
- David Allenby James Alger, Plumber, Ministry of Defence.
- Leslie Victor Amos, Senior Messenger, Ministry of Defence.
- Frederick Harold Ansell, Auxiliary Electrical Worker B, Department of the Environment.
- Harold Appleton, Storekeeping Assistant I, Ministry of Defence.
- Vernon Albert Apps, Armament Fitter, Ministry of Defence.
- Maurice Raymond Apsley, Armourer Chargehand, Ministry of Defence.
- Ernesto Artesani, Stores Supervisory Grade D, Ministry of Defence.
- Winifred Ashall, Production Worker I, Ministry of Defence.
- Leonard William Askew, Professional and Technology Officer IV, Ministry of Defence.
- Sidney Alfred Asplett, Skilled Labourer, Ministry of Defence.
- Patrick Henry Atkinson, Marine Service Officer III, Ministry of Defence.
- Edwin Amos Avery, Fitter Electrical, Ministry of Defence.
- William Alexander Penny Baird, Professional and Technology Officer III, Ministry of Defence.
- Reginald Ballard, Professional and Technology Officer III, Ministry of Defence.
- John Banks, Electrician, Ministry of Defence.
- Albert Banton, Process and General Supervisory B, Ministry of Defence.
- Thomas William James Barnard, Skilled Labourer, Ministry of Defence.
- Charles Albert Barnes, Senior Storeman, Ministry of Defence.
- Hector Barnfather, Professional and Technology Officer IV, Ministry of Defence.
- James Barr, Senior Storeman, Ministry of Defence.
- Robert Edward Barton, Professional and Technology Officer IV, Ministry of Defence.
- Arthur Ernest Albert Bassett, Skilled Labourer, Ministry of Defence.
- Cecil James Baxter, Tinsmith, Ministry of Defence.
- George Earnest James Redgwell Beal, Professional and Technology Officer IV, Department of the Environment.
- Joseph Beale, Skilled Labourer, Ministry of Defence.
- Ronald Victor Bee, Fire Patrolman, Department of the Environment.
- Vivian Belcher, Fitter, Ministry of Defence.
- Alfred Norman Bennett, Progressor, Ministry of Defence.
- Gordon Sydney Bennett, Senior Storeman, Ministry of Defence.
- Robert Lewis Bennett, Messenger, Department of the Environment.
- Ronald Myhre Bennett, Civilian Instructional Officer Grade III, Ministry of Defence.
- Thomas James Bermingham, Telecommunications Technical Officer III, Ministry of Defence.
- Robert Black, Joiner, Ministry of Defence.
- John Barter Blair, Planner A/E Chargehand, Ministry of Defence.
- Cyril Stanley Blissett, Stores Officer Grade D, Ministry of Defence.
- James Rae Bolan, Fitter Dilutee, Ministry of Defence.
- Herbert Frank Leslie Boorah, Fitter Electrical, Ministry of Defence.
- Robert Bowen, Assistant Groundsman, Department of the Environment.
- Percy Henry Bradbeer, Professional and Technology Officer IV, Department of the Environment.
- John Bradley, Skilled Labourer, Ministry of Defence.
- Sidney Clarence Bridges, Machinis, Ministry of Defence.
- John Alan Christopher Bridgewater, Professional and Technology Officer III, Ministry of Defence.
- Frank Briggs, Stores Officer Grade D, Ministry of Defence.
- Roy Arthur Bright, Foreman Carpenter, Department of the Environment.
- Hilda Brooker, Stewardess, Ministry of Defence.
- John William Brooks, Stores Officer Grade C, Ministry of Defence.
- Henry Christie Brown, Land Preventive Man, HM Customs and Excise.
- Cyril Brumby, Gardener, Department of the Environment.
- George Hendry Buchan, Stoker B, Department of the Environment.
- William George Augustus Bullock, Engineering Plant Operator II, Department of the Environment.
- Peter Daniel Burke, Storeman, Ministry of Defence.
- Manuel Busto, Tractor Driver, Ministry of Defence.
- Arthur Leonard Joseph Butler, Welder, Ministry of Defence.
- George Butler, Fitter, Ministry of Defence.
- Bertie Roy Cable, Process and General Supervisory Grade D, Ministry of Defence.
- Frank Calder, Professional and Technology Officer IV, Ministry of Defence.
- Arthur Calleja, Professional and Technology Officer III, Ministry of Defence.
- Hugh Duncan Cameron, Professional and Technology Officer IV, Ministry of Defence.
- Joseph Cannon, Skilled Labourer, Ministry of Defence.
- Frederick Albert Carne, Experimental Worker III, Ministry of Defence.
- Albert James Chambers, Fitter, Ministry of Defence.
- Lloyd Chammings, Motor Transport Driver, Ministry of Defence.
- Robert Charles Chant, Fitter, Ministry of Defence.
- Peter Gordon Fortesque Childs, Skilled Labourer, Ministry of Defence.
- Thomas Clarke, Professional and Technology Officer IV, Ministry of Defence.
- Sidney James Coles, Storeman, Ministry of Defence.
- Emrys Bramwell Collins, Radio Technician, Ministry of Defence.
- Ernest James Cregeen, Skilled Labourer, Ministry of Defence.
- Claudia Elizabeth Davies, Storewoman, Supply and Transport Store, Watford, Home Office.
- Francis John Davy, Senior Officer Instructor, H.M. Prison, Ford, Home Office.
- Sidney Harold Douglas Day, Electrician Radio, Ministry of Defence.
- William Maitland Dennis, Machinist, Ministry of Defence.
- Marjora Dovey, Production Worker I, Ministry of Defence.
- Leslie Ernest Dunne, Professional and Technology Officer III, Ministry of Defence.
- Arthur William Edgeworth, Storeman A, Department of the Environment.
- Olive Mary Emary, Photoprinter I, Ministry of Defence.
- David Ewart, Skilled Labourer, Ministry of Defence.
- Donald Aubrey Farrell, Professional and Technology Officer III, Ministry of Defence.
- Frank Herbert Field, Senior Photographer, Ministry of Defence.
- William Firby, Craftsman II, Ministry of Defence.
- James Fleming, Fitter, Ministry of Defence.
- Harold Franks, Marker Out, Ministry of Defence.
- Arthur Walter Fromont, Craftsman Auxiliary A, Department of the Environment.
- Victor Donald Galloway, Officer Instructor, H.M. Prison, Standford Hill, Home Office.
- William Richard Giffin, Chart Supply Officer, Ministry of Defence.
- David Gilliland, Joiner, Ministry of Defence.
- Frederick Arthur Godden, Renovator, Ministry of Defence.
- Arnold Gorman, Principal Officer, Officers Training School, Leyhill, Home Office.
- John Robinson Graham, Explosive Maintenance Assistant, Ministry of Defence.
- John Grant, Motor Transport Driver, Ministry of Defence.
- John Francis Griffin, Skilled Labourer, Ministry of Defence.
- Louis Allan Groombridge, Labourer, Ministry of Defence.
- John Hamilton, Senior Storeman, Ministry of Defence.
- Sidney James Hancock, T. & G. Stores Officer Grade D, Ministry of Defence.
- Emily Ada Harris, Storewoman I, Ministry of Defence.
- Charles Robert Hawkins, Chargehand Electrician, Department of the Environment.
- Percy Eric Hawkins, Craftsman Special, Ministry of Defence.
- Albert Edward Head, Chargehand Electrician, Department of the Environment.
- Samuel Heaton, Setter A, Ministry of Defence.
- Raymond Thomas Herpels, Carpenter/Joiner, Department of the Environment.
- Bertram George Higgs, Aircraft Fitter, Ministry of Defence.
- Charles Arthur Hodge, Principal Officer, H.M. Prison, Chelmsford, Home Office.
- Geoffrey Lionel Luscombe Holland, Professional and Technology Officer IV, Ministry of Defence.
- Edith Rosena Honeysett, Supervisor of Duplicator Operators, Ministry of Defence.
- Harry Grenfell Hounslow, Professional and Technology Officer III, Ministry of Defence.
- Douglas Wilson Hurley, Labourer, Ministry of Defence.
- Ronald John Jackson, Explosives Maitenance Assistant, Ministry of Defence.
- William George Jackson, Messenger, Ministry of Defence.
- Desmond Leonard Fitzgerald Jarden, Senior Storeman, Ministry of Defence.
- William Clarence Jeffery, Carpenter, Department of the Environment.
- David Leslie Johns, Professional and Technology Officer IV, Ministry of Defence.
- Roy James Johns, Storeman, Ministry of Defence.
- John Jones, Plumber, Department of the Environment.
- Harry James Jordan, Process and General Supervisory C, Ministry of Defence.
- Francis Kane, Skilled Labourer, Ministry of Defence.
- Leonard Cecil Lewis Kemp, Marine Service Officer IV, Ministry of Defence.
- Leonard Kerr, Stores Assistant Grade II, Ministry of Defence.
- Leonard Kidd, Fitter/Turner, Ministry of Defence.
- Alfred Charles Knott, Storeman, Ministry of Defence.
- Arthur Henry Kynaston, Labourer I, Ministry of Defence.
- Thomas Lamont, Skilled Labourer, Ministry of Defence.
- Bertie Ernest Thomas Lissenden, Shipwright/Driller, Ministry of Defence.
- Arthur James Long, Driver, Ministry of Defence.
- Gerald Maurice Henry Lote, Fitter Engine, Ministry of Defence.
- William Burbridge Mark Edmund Lovell, Professional and Technology Officer IV, Ministry of Defence.
- Frank Godfrey Lowe, Chargehand Fitte, Ministry of Defencer.
- Reginald Lugsden, Equipment Examiner, Ministry of Defence.
- George McBurney, Coppersmith, Ministry of Defence.
- Thomas Gerard McCormick, Joiner, Ministry of Defence.
- Michael McCusker, Stores Officer Grade D, Ministry of Defence.
- Patrick James McGill, Production Worker I, Chargehand, Ministry of Defence.
- Thomas McGlone, Motor Transport Driver, Ministry of Defence.
- Charles Henry Douglas McKenzie, Machinist, Ministry of Defence.
- Bernard McKeown, Fitter, Ministry of Defence.
- John Lilley McMillan, Fitter, Ministry of Defence.
- Harold Albert Macavoy, Professional and Technology Officer IV, Ministry of Defence.
- Hugh Mackintosh, Professional and Technology Officer IV, Ministry of Defence.
- Edgar Charles Manley, Professional and Technology Officer III, Ministry of Defence.
- Frederick Leonard Job Manning, Skilled Labourer, Ministry of Defence.
- Arthur James Charles Marsh, Driver, Ministry of Defence.
- Kenneth William John Marshall, Laboratory Mechanic, Ministry of Defence.
- Arthur Martin, Skilled Labourer, Ministry of Defence.
- James Mathewson, Fitter, Ministry of Defence.
- Jack Douglas Mattey, Vehicle Mechanic, Ministry of Defence.
- Hugh Mawhinney, Senior Storeman, Ministry of Defence.
- Norman Mayes, Professional and Technology Officer IV, Ministry of Defence.
- Ronald Henry Meatyard, Draughtsman Higher Grade, Ministry of Defence.
- John Ernest Milne, Professional and Technology Officer IV, Ministry of Defence.
- Tom Miles, Chief Photoprinter, Ministry of Defence.
- Donald Michael Mitchell, Professional and Technology Officer III, Department of the Environment.
- George Montgomery, Rigger, Ministry of Defence.
- Mair Morgan, Labourer, Ministry of Defence.
- John Douglas Morris, Craftsman Auxiliary B, Department of the Environment.
- Albert Ernest Morrison, Professional and Technology Officer IV, Ministry of Defence.
- William Joseph Morrissey, Leading Seaman, Ministry of Defence.
- Wilfred Douglas Samuel Haig Mullard, Storeman, Ministry of Defence.
- John Patterson Munro, Foreman, Department of the Environment.
- John Samuel Murphy, Boiler Plant Attendant, H.M. Remand Centre, Pucklechurch, Home Office.
- Eric Arthur Murrey, Craftsman Auxiliary B, Department of the Environment.
- Stanley Lawrence Nash, Plant Attendant, Department of the Environment.
- Stanley Needham, Sheet Metal Worker, Ministry of Defence.
- William Albert Newbold, M.B.E., Equipment Examiner, Ministry of Defence.
- Hugh Nimmons, Motor Transport Driver/Chargehand, Ministry of Defence.
- William Henry Nixon, Professional and Technology Officer IV, Ministry of Defence.
- Ronald Norris, Fitter Dilutee, Ministry of Defence.
- Ivor George Norvill, Storeman Senior, Ministry of Defence.
- James Alfred Alexander Novis, Storeman, H.M. Prison, Bedford, Home Office.
- Ronald Trevenen Leopald Opie, Section Leader (Fire Brigade).
- James Turnbull Orrock, Labourer, Ministry of Defence.
- John Joseph O'Shea, B.E.M., Senior Messenger, Ministry of Defence.
- Doris May Pamplin, Storewoman, Ministry of Defence.
- Norman Anthony Parr, Professional and Technology Officer III, Ministry of Defence.
- Victor Patterson, Professional and Technology Officer IV, Ministry of Defence.
- David Bruce Payne, Stores Assistant II, Ministry of Defence.
- Basil Poffley-Rae, Craftsman, Ministry of Defence.
- Edward Leslie Portnall, Skilled Labourer Chargehand, Ministry of Defence.
- Ernest Proctor, Production Worker II, Ministry of Defence.
- Charles Joseph Quigley, Stores Officer Grade D, Ministry of Defence.
- Antonio Luis Ramos, Chargehand Electrical Fitter, Department of the Environment.
- George William Redding, Chargehand Patrolman Checker, Department of the Environment.
- Alen Leslie Rehill, Government Telephonist, Ministry of Defence.
- Thomas Edward Riddick, Foreman New Style, Department of the Environment.
- Alfred Alan Riddle, Professional and Technology Officer IV, Ministry of Defence.
- William Rimmer, Joiner, Department of the Environment.
- Cecil Harold Percy Mordent Rivington, Mobile Crane Driver Leading Hand, Ministry of Defence.
- Thomas James Robinson, Storeman, Ministry of Defence.
- Henry John Rutland, Professional and Technology Officer IV, Department of the Environment.
- Frederick William Salter, Setter A, Ministry of Defence.
- Charles Sampson, Craftsman, Ministry of Defence.
- Sidney James Sands, Iron Caulker Riveter, Ministry of Defence.
- Thomas Saunders, Chief Officer II, H.M. Borstal, Gaynes Hall, Home Office.
- Frederick Schofield, Motor Transport Drive, Ministry of Defence.
- Frederick Henry Francis Searle, Airfield Fireman, Ministry of Defence.
- Ernest Seldon, Labourer, Ministry of Defence.
- Edward Sheehan, Coach Trimmer, Ministry of Defence.
- Wilfred Gersham Simpson, Slinger Leading Hand, Ministry of Defence.
- Harold Percival George Skelton, Professional and Technology Officer IV, Ministry of Defence.
- Brian Leonard Smalley, Professional and Technology Officer IV, Ministry of Defence.
- Lawrence Edwin Stroud Smith, M.M., Senior Officer, H.M. Prison, Brixton, Home Office.
- Reginald Albert Smith, Senior Officer, H.M. Prison, Norwich, Home Office.
- Robert Cookson Smith, Locomotive Driver Chargehand, Ministry of Defence.
- James Somerset, Professional and Technology Officer III, Ministry of Defence.
- Leslie Roy Stebbeds, Stoker C, Department of the Environment.
- Alan Bell Stirling, Fitter, Ministry of Defence.
- George Alexander Taylor Strath, Professional and Technology Officer III, Ministry of Defence.
- Henry Lloyd Strong, Driver, Ministry of Defence.
- Ronald Thomas, Storeman, Ministry of Defence.
- Samuel Fulton Thompson, Professional and Technology Officer IV, Ministry of Defence.
- John Thomson, Foreman, Department of the Environment.
- Samuel Totton, Professional and Technology Officer IV, Ministry of Defence.
- William Andrew Trotter, Land Preventive Man, HM Customs and Excise.
- Joe Tubby, Motor Transport Fitter, Ministry of Defence.
- Peter Eustace Thomas Turner, Skilled Labourer, Ministry of Defence.
- Harold James Urquhart, Skilled Labourer, Ministry of Defence.
- George Walter Utting, Fitter, Ministry of Defence.
- George Vernalls, Fork Lift Truck Driver, Ministry of Defence.
- Herbert Wager, Photoprinter I, Ministry of Defence.
- Francis Walker, Stores Officer Grade D, Ministry of Defence.
- Leslie Albert Ward, Fitter Leading Chargehand, Ministry of Defence.
- Alphonse Charles Warren, Storeman Senior, Ministry of Defence.
- Victor Eric Watkins, Professional and Technology Officer III, Ministry of Defence.
- James Charley West, Skilled Labourer, Ministry of Defence.
- Charles Albert Whent, Fitter Turner, Ministry of Defence.
- Percy George White, Machinist, Ministry of Defence.
- James Whitson, Fitter, Ministry of Defence.
- Raymond Victor Wild, Professional and Technology Officer IV, Ministry of Defence.
- William John Leslie Wilding, Chief Officer II, H.M. Prison, Sudbury, Home Office.
- Robert Brownlees Wilson, Fitter, Ministry of Defence.
- Thomas Wilson, Fitter, Ministry of Defence.
- Frederick John Yarde, Joiner Chargehand, Ministry of Defence.

Australia

State of Western Australia

- Mervyn Keith Blinco, Stores Officer, Education Supplies Branch, Education Department.
- Theodore Gomez Edwards, Head Reader, Government Printing Office.
- John Joseph Flynn, Locomotive Driver, Westrail.
- Walter Norman Froome, Stock Inspector, Animal Health Division, Department of Agriculture.
- Clifford Walter Jackson, District Officer, Public Works Department.
- John Vincent Larkin, Senior Laboratory Technologist in Charge, Animal Health Division, Department of Agriculture.
- Phillip James Rettig, Foreman, Central Maintenance Workshop, Technical Education Division, Education Department.

State of New South Wales

- John Martin Aldridge, Fitter, Public Transport Commission.
- Reginald Bailey, Timekeeper, Department of Public Works.
- Stanley Edward Baker, Timekeeper, Department of Public Works.
- Frederick Alexander Carey-Smith, Senior Detective Inspector, Public Transport Commission.
- Alfred Edward Curley, Labourer, Department of Public Works.
- John Alexander Currie, Inspector, Public Transport Commission.
- David Henry Curtain, Supply Officer, Department of Public Works.
- Kevin Bead Davis, Officer-in-Charge, Burrinjuck Dam, Water Services Commission.
- Joseph James Doherty, Foreman Boilermaker, Public Transport Commission.
- James Edward Eagles, Head Shunter, Public Transport Commission.
- Mathew John Fittler, Estimator, Department of Public Works.
- Clyde Wesley Freeman, Assistant Station Master, Public Transport Commission.
- Raymond Henry Grant, Shunter, Public Transport Commission.
- Norman Cecil Hayes, Controller, Government Printing Office.
- Raymond Haynes, Bridge Ganger, Public Transport Commission.
- Leslie Thomas Francis Heffernan, Fettler, Public Transport Commission.
- Reginald Percy Hetherington, Patrolman, Public Transport Commission.
- Leslie Oswald Hollis, Foreman, Forestry Commission.
- Grantley Herries Jago, Assistant Station Master, Public Transport Commission.
- John Jones, Superintendent, Department of Corrective Services.
- William Kelly, Clerk of Works, Department of Public Works.
- John Lachlan McDonald, Security Guard, Public Transport Commission.
- Violet Kathleen McNamara, Instructor, Public Transport Commission.
- Frank Oswald Marsh, Acting Traffic Chargeman, Public Transport Commission.
- Leslie Cecil Mitchell, Foreman, Forestry Commission.
- Ronald Keith Moore, Supply Officer, Health Commission.
- Claude Owen Moseley, Foreman, Forestry Commission.
- Frank Thomas Ogden, Bookbinder, Government Printing Office.
- James Geoffrey Osborn, Assistant Station Master, Public Transport Commission.
- Reginald John Lionel Pomeroy, Leading Station Master, Public Transport Commission.
- Richard Francis Quirk, Senior Charge Nurse, Health Commission.
- Frederick Charles Saxon, Ticket Examiner, Public Transport Commission.
- Ernest Leslie Northbridge Smith, Special Class Signalman, Public Transport Commission.
- Eric Somerfield, Security Guard Public Transport Commission.
- Joseph Starr, Senior Charge Nurse, Health Commission.
- Eric Edward Studdert, Guard, Public Transport Commission.
- Richard James Watson, Senior Charge Nurse, Health Commission.
- Stanley James Wilesmith, Track Supervisor, Public Transport Commission.
- Wilfred Archier Willing, Special Class Guard, Public Transport Commission.
- William John Woodger, Senior Charge Nurse, Health Commission.
- George Henry Young, Clerk of Works, Department of Public Works.

Hong Kong

- Wing-sam Chan, Telephone Operator.

== Queen's Gallantry Medal (QGM) ==
- Captain George David Preston Bain, Chief Pilot, British Airways Helicopters Ltd., Sumburgh, Shetland.
- Captain Alasdair Boyd MacNeill Campbell, Pilot, British Airways Helicopters Ltd., Sumburgh, Shetland.
- Stanley Noel Blake, Constable, Royal Ulster Constabulary. For gallantly in Northern Ireland.
- David Brannigan, Constable, Royal Ulster Constabulary. For gallantly in Northern Ireland.
- John James Cassidy, Constable, Royal Ulster Constabulary. For gallantly in Northern Ireland.
- Desmond Patrick Conroy, B.E.M., Sergeant, Royal Ulster Constabulary. For gallantly in Northern Ireland.
- Victor George Ferguson, Constable, Royal Ulster Constabulary. For gallantly in Northern Ireland.
- Richard Allister Knowles, Constable, Royal Ulster Constabulary. For gallantly in Northern Ireland.
- John Ross Little, O.B.E., Chief Constable, Tayside Police.
- Campbell Kennedy McCormack, Constable, Royal Ulster Constabulary. For gallantly in Northern Ireland.
- James Melville, Sergeant, Tayside Police.
- Hans Miller, Constable, Strathclyde Police.
- Miss Ann Elizabeth Sutherland, Sergeant, Royal Ulster Constabulary. For gallantry in Northern Ireland.

== Queen's Commendation for Brave Conduct ==
- Roger James Baldry, Sergeant, Metropolitan Police. For disarming and overpowering a man armed with a pistol and knives who threatened them while resisting arrest.
- Brian Malcolm Clark, Constable, Metropolitan Police. For disarming and overpowering a man armed with a pistol and knives who threatened them while resisting arrest.
- Paul Leon Bazire, Constable, Metropolitan Police. For services leading to the arrest of a gang of armed robbers.
- Richard Thomas Gardner, Constable, Metropolitan Police. For services leading to the arrest of a gang of armed robbers.
- Roger John Herbert, Mechanic, Newbury Park, Ilford, Essex. For services leading to the arrest of a gang of armed robbers.
- Miss Laura Jane Duignan, Cadet, Royal Ulster Constabulary. For bravery in Northern Ireland.
- Richard Noel Heaybourne, Constable, Royal Ulster Constabulary. For bravery in Northern Ireland.
- William Robert Jackson, Q.G.M., Constable, Royal Ulster Constabulary. For bravery in Northern Ireland.
- Miss Irene Elizabeth Thompson, Constable, Royal Ulster Constabulary. For bravery in Northern Ireland.
- Miss Mandy Elcock, Constable, West Midlands Police. For services leading to the rescue of a mentally disturbed man who was threatening to commit suicide.
- Brian Ewart, Constable, Strathclyde Police. For services leading to the arrest of two criminals who had committed an armed robbery.
- James Ferguson, Constable, Strathclyde Police. For services leading to the arrest of two criminals who had committed an armed robbery.
- William Toome Finlay, Reserve Constable, Royal Ulster Constabulary. For bravery in Northern Ireland.
- Ernest Anthony William Foster, Constable, Royal Ulster Constabulary. For bravery in Northern Ireland.
- Lester Linsford Garnett, Constable, Belize Police Force. For services leading to the arrest of an armed murderer.
- Keith Harrison, Constable, Nottinghamshire Constabulary. For services in confronting and disarming a man who had shot and wounded his wife.
- Peter John Hollands, Divisional Officer (Grade 1), Royal Berkshire Fire Brigade. For services leading to the rescue of a colleague, who was trapped beneath the wreckage of a burning building.
- Kenneth Edward Reed, Station Officer, Royal Berkshire Fire Brigade. For services leading to the rescue of a colleague, who was trapped beneath the wreckage of a burning building.
- Gwyndaf Lewis Jones, Constable, Dyfed Powys Police. For services leading to the arrest of an armed criminal.
- David Gwynfor Rees, Constable, Dyfed Powys Police. For services leading to the arrest of an armed criminal.
- Wilfred Lavery, Constable, Durham Constabulary. For services leading to the arrest of a man who had robbed a gunsmith's shop, stolen a weapon and was behaving in a threatening manner.
- Robert George Mair (Deceased), lately Medical Practitioner, Ballantrae, Ayrshire. For services in attempting to rescue a girl who was in danger of drowning in rough seas.
- Fernando Oliveira, Salesman, London, W.8. For services in pursuing and detaining an armed robber.
- Eric George Roberts, Attendant, London Ambulance Service. For services leading to the rescue of a mentally unbalanced man who had attempted to commit suicide by jumping into the path of an oncoming underground train.
- Brian Herbert Whiting, Lorry Driver, London, S.E.12. For services in tackling and detaining an armed man.
- Thomas Henry Williams, Able Seaman, M.V. "Dragon", P. & O. Normandy Ferries Ltd. For services leading to the rescue of the master of a yacht which was in difficulties in heavy seas and gale force winds.
- Robert Harris Williamson, Sergeant, Essex Police. For services in pursuing and attempting to arrest three armed men who had been involved in a wages hold-up.

== Queen's Commendation for Valuable Service in the Air ==
- Captain Campbell Claude Bosanquet, Pilot, British Airways Helicopters Ltd. For services leading to the rescue in severe weather conditions and poor visibility of eight crew men stranded on board a wrecked trawler.
- Brian Leslie Johnstone, Operations Assistant, British Airways Helicopters Ltd. For services leading to the rescue in severe weather conditions and poor visibility of eight crew men stranded on board a wrecked trawler.

== See also ==
- 2021 Special Honours
- 2020 Special Honours
- 2019 Special Honours
- 2018 Special Honours
- 2017 Special Honours
- 1993 Special Honours
- 1991 Special Honours
- 1989 Special Honours
- 1987 Special Honours
- 1986 Special Honours
- 1982 Special Honours
- 1974 Special Honours
- 1973 Special Honours
