= 1977 Special Honours =

British government recognitions

As part of the British honours system, Special Honours are issued at the Monarch's pleasure at any given time. The Special Honours refer to the awards made within royal prerogative, operational honours and other honours awarded outside the New Years Honours and Birthday Honours.

== Most Excellent Order of the British Empire ==
=== Commander of the Order of the British Empire (CBE) ===
Military Division

Army

- Brigadier Charles Peter Campbell (357612), late Corps of Royal Engineers.
- Brigadier Richard Eustace John Gerrard-Wright, O.B.E. (407841), late The Royal Anglian Regiment.

=== Officer of the Order of the British Empire (OBE) ===
Military Division

Army

- Lieutenant Colonel Alan Malcolm Hinings, M.B.E. (430327), The Queen's Lancashire Regiment.

=== Member of the Order of the British Empire (MBE) ===
Military Division

Army

- Major Michael John Patrick Best (472489) Royal Regiment of Artillery.
- Major Patrick James Cardwell Moore (470120) The Royal Scots (The Royal Regiment).
- Captain The Honourable Philip John Algernon Sidney (480760), Grenadier Guards.

== George Medal (GM) ==
- 23898399 Staff Sergeant Roger Vardon Bruce, Royal Army Ordnance Corps.

== British Empire Medal (BEM) ==
Military Division

- 24090474 Corporal Alexander Hannah, The Argyll and Sutherland Highlanders (Princess Louise's).
- 24003947 Sergeant Edward Victor Young, The Cheshire Regiment.

== Military Medal (MM) ==
- 24134224 Corporal (acting Sergeant) Patrick John Ralph, The Green Howards (Alexandra, Princess of Wales's Own Yorkshire Regiment).

== Queen's Gallantry Medal (QGM) ==
- John Allport, Constable, Metropolitan Police.
- Joseph Martin Henry Beecroft, Sergeant 2nd Class, New South Wales Police.
- Gerard Francis Buchtmann, Captain, Xepean Volunteer Rescue Squad.
- Gardiner Dawson, Reserve Constable Royal Ulster Constabulary. For gallantry in Northern Ireland.
- Aubrey Driscoll, Governor, H.M. Prison, Liverpool.
- Guy Richard Goronwy Edwards, Racing Driver.
- William Robert Elliott, Constable, Royal Ulster Constabulary. For gallantry in Northern Ireland.
- Kenneth Ralph Kay, Fireman, Berkshire Fire Brigade.
- William Kinniburgh, Constable, Metropolitan Police.
- James Charles Pearcey, Estate Agent, Walthamstow, London E.17.
- Ernest Branwell Pedersen, Police Medical Officer, Denistone, New South Wales.
- James Ferguson Steele, lately Seed and Implement Merchant, Belfast. For gallantry in Northern Ireland.
- Mervyn Charles Thomas, Registrar, Prince Henry Hospital, Little Bay, New South Wales.
- Miss Margaret Joyce Warby, Sister, Parramatta District Hospital, Parramatta, New South Wales.
- Daryl Raymond Williams, Inspector 2nd Class, New South Wales Police.
- Yip, Long-ping, Salesman, Shing Yuen Goldsmith's Shop, Kowloon, Hong Kong.

== Queen's Commendation for Brave Conduct ==
- Alexander Algie, Sergeant 1st Class, New South Wales Police Force.
- Jack Bannister, Constable, Metropolitan Police.
- Peter Francis Beacroft, Senior Constable, New South Wales Police Force.
- Barry Steven Brewster, Medical Practitioner, Settle, North Yorkshire.
- David Bright, Constable, Essex Police
- David Charles Brockway, Constable, West Mercia Constabulary
- Peter Patrick Croxford, B.E.M., Chief Inspector, Essex Police.
- Roy Donovan, Sergeant, Essex Police.
- Neil Henry Harris, Constable, New South Wales Police Force.
- John Frederick Spinks, Sergeant, Metropolitan Police.
- Michael Turner, Constable, Metropolitan Police.

== Mentioned in Despatches ==
Royal Navy

- Commander Nicholas Humphrey Nowell Wright, Royal Navy.
- Lieutenant John David Plummer, Royal Navy.
- Major Christopher James Hickinbotham, Royal Marines.
- Lieutenant Alexander Malcolm Mason, Royal Marines.

Army

- 23462661 Warrant Officer Class 2 Dennis Baron, Royal Corps of Transport.
- Lieutenant Simon James Barry (497367), The Parachute Regiment.
- Major Brian Baty, M.M. (480027), General List.
- 23256793 Staff Sergeant Malcolm Brian Jack Baughan, M.M., The Parachute Regiment.
- 24031261 Sergeant Victor Robert Bennett, Royal Army Veterinary Corps.
- 24017021 Sergeant (acting Staff Sergeant) Philip John Carr, The Cheshire Regiment.
- 24174457 Corporal John Roper Cavanagh, 15th/19th The King's Royal Hussars.
- Captain Peter Mackay Dixon Coeshott (481623), Royal Army Ordnance Corps.
- Major Graham Coxon, M.B.E. (461676), The Stafford- shire Regiment (The Prince of Wales's).
- 24153997 Corporal John Lawrence Eedle, The Cheshire Regiment.
- Colonel John Wheatley Gray (377276) late The Royal Regiment of Fusiliers.
- Lieutenant Richard Edward Gillies (502671), The King's Own Scottish Borderers.
- 824129784 Lance Corporal Thomas Ashley Holloway, The King's Regiment.
- Lieutenant Colonel John Michael Jones (453508),Royal Horse Artillery.
- Major Michael Clement Le Masurier (465795), The Queen's Lancashire Regiment.
- Lieutenant Colonel Andrew Christopher David lloyd (449003), Corps of Royal Engineers.
- Major Roger Patrick Miller (476395), The Parachute Regiment.
- Lieutenant Colonel Peter Stuart Morton (445926), The Parachute Regiment.
- 2nd Lieutenant Paul Stephen Raybould Norman (500387) The Cheshire Regiment.
- Major Alexander Douglas Morton Ogilvie (458722), The Queen's Lancashire Regiment.
- Lieutenant Colonel Christopher Robert Parrish (414938), Corps of Royal Electrical and Mechanical Engineers.
- Lieutenant Colonel William Keith Lloyd Prosser, M.B.E., M.C. (449037), The Cheshire Regiment.
- Major David John Venn (470165), Intelligence Corps.
- 824283821 Corporal Colin Arthur Wallbanks, The Staffordshire Regiment (The Prince of Wales's).
- 23689425 Warrant Officer Class 2 Colin Leslie Wilson, Intelligence Corps.

== See also ==
- 2021 Special Honours
- 2020 Special Honours
- 2019 Special Honours
- 2018 Special Honours
- 2017 Special Honours
- 1993 Special Honours
- 1991 Special Honours
- 1982 Special Honours
- 1979 Special Honours
- 1974 Special Honours
- 1973 Special Honours
