= 1986 Special Honours =

British government recognitions

As part of the British honours system, Special Honours are issued at the Monarch's pleasure at any given time. The Special Honours refer to the awards made within royal prerogative, operational honours and other honours awarded outside the New Years Honours and Birthday Honours.

== Most Excellent Order of the British Empire ==
=== Commander of the Order of the British Empire (CBE) ===
Military Division

Army

- Brigadier Roger St. Clair Preston, O.B.E. (443540), Staff late Light Infantry.

=== Officer of the Order of the British Empire (OBE) ===
Military Division

Army

- Lieutenant-Colonel James Gordon Barber (473870), Corps of Royal Engineers.
- Lieutenant-Colonel William Robert Dickson, M.B.E (489435). Ulster Defence Regiment.
- Major Peter David Harry (480325), The Royal Regiment of Wales.
- Lieutenant Colonel John Stanley Regan (489929), Royal Army Ordnance Corps.
- Lieutenant Colonel Martin Edridge Romilly (475225), The Royal Anglian Regiment.

=== Member of the Order of the British Empire (MBE) ===
Military Division

Army

- Major Ronald William Michael Baker (424252), Ulster Defence Regiment.
- 24027697 Warrant Officer Class II (acting Warrant Officer Class I) Peter James Baron, Intelligence Corps.
- Major Robert McMeekin Bonar (495056), Ulster Defence Regiment.
- Major Mark Stephen Buck (500258), Army Air Corps.
- Major Michael Collins (507793), Ulster Defence Regiment.
- 23864892 Warrant Officer Class II Guy James Crofts, Royal Corps of Signals.
- Major Matthew Ashley Lyle Cummins (453002), Ulster Defence Regiment.
- Captain Robert Stephen Ernest McKay (512755), Ulster Defence Regiment.
- Major Edwin Frank Palmer (482967), Royal Corps of Transport.
- Major (now Lieutenant Colonel) Kenneth Andrew Peacock (482805), The Prince of Wales's Own, Regiment of Yorkshire.
- Captain (acting Major) Prunella Jane Samson (495286), Women's Royal Army Corps.
- Captain David Douglas Smith (517931), Royal Corps of Signals.
- Major (Quartermaster) David William Spalding (504723), The Royal Anglian Regiment.
- Captajn Michael Keith Watkins (509863), Royal Army Ordnance Corps.
- Major Michael John Watson (487599), The Prince of Wales's Own Regiment of Yorkshire.
- Captain Kenneth Henry Webb (504131), Ulster Defence Regiment.

== George Medal (GM) ==
- Major Michael John Davison, M.B.E. (485709), Royal Army Ordnance Corps.

== Queen's Gallantry Medal (QGM) ==
- 24329999 Private (now acting Sergeant) Charles Christian Cameron Bruce, The Parachute Regiment.
- 23914661 Warrant Officer Class II Michael Anthony Christy, B.E.M., Corps of Royal Engineers.
- 24204737 Warrant Officer Class II Jonathan Lionel Austin Earey, Royal Army Ordnance Corps.
- Captain Mark William Grieveson (511552), Royal Army Ordnance Corps.
- 24146900 Staff Sergeant Ian McQueen, The Parachute Regiment.
- 24215513 Sergeant Malcolm Shearer, 17/21st Lancers (now Intelligence Corps).
- 24256213 Sergeant (now acting Staff Sergeant) Christopher John Williams, Intelligence Corps.
- Captain (now Major) George Victor Alexander Williams, M.B.E. (509878), Intelligence Corps.

=== British Empire Medal (BEM) ===
Military Division

- 24199545 Corporal William John Barton, Ulster Defence Regiment.
- 24117795 Staff Sergeant Thomas Andrea Bowen, The King's Own Royal Border Regiment.
- 24275478 Sergeant Norman Sydney Crawford, Ulster Defence Regiment.
- 24055648 Staff Sergeant (now acting Warrant Officer Class II) Stephen James Firth, Intelligence Corps.
- 24195839 Staff Sergeant Rodger Christopher Helmn, The Green Howards (Alexandra, Princess of Wales's Own Yorkshire Regiment).
- 24303241 Sergeant (now Staff Sergeant) John Michael Higgs, The Duke of Edinburgh's Royal Regiment (Berkshire and Wiltshire).
- 24301066 Staff Sergeant (now Warrant Officer Class II) Thomas James Hynes, Ulster Defence Regiment.
- 24115764 Staff Sergeant Kevin Guy Pilgrim, Intelligence Corps.
- 24328320 Sergeant Ian Robert Douglas Strettle, Corps of Royal Engineers.

== Queen's Commendation for Valuable Service in the Air ==
- 24012331 Sergeant William Robert Griffiths, 14th/ 20th King's Hussars.

== Mention-in-Despatches ==
- Lieutenant-Colonel Stuart Grant Adlington (475089), The Green Howards (Alexandra, Princess of Wales's Own Yorkshire Regiment).
- 24386018 Lance Corporal John Francis Armstrong, Ulster Defence Regiment.
- Captain Sharon Teresa Aungiers (512238), Women's Royal Army Corps (attd Royal Electrical and Mechanical Engineers).
- 24472292 Corporal Kevin Edwin Baldock, The Royal Anglian Regiment.
- 24198339 Warrant Officer Class II Paul Raymond Curtis, B.E.M., Intelligence Corps.
- Captain (acting Major) Adrian Matthew Donaldson (504701), Ulster Defence Regiment.
- 24164262 Staff Sergeant Andrew James Urquhart Dowie, Scots Guards.
- Lieutenant-Colonel (now Colonel) Julian John Finch Field, O.B.E., M.C. (473943), The Devonshire and Dorset Regiment.
- 24506910 Lance Corporal Carl Brian Fisher, The Royal Regiment of Fusiliers.
- 24221141 Sergeant Peter John David Fleming, Q.G.M., Corps of Royal Military Police.
- Lieutenant-Colonel Rory Hamish John Forsyth (473947), The Prince of Wales's Own Regiment of Yorkshire.
- 24508854 Corporal James Arthur Gedney, Royal Corps of Transport.
- 24551818 Corporal Michael Anthony Germaine, Royal Army Medical Corps.
- Captain Archibald James Graham Gibson (506846), Queen's Own Highlanders (Seaforth and Camerons).
- 24055073 Warrant Officer Class II James Francis Hanifin, Royal Corps of Signals.
- Lieutenant Colonel Guy de Vere Wingfield Hayes (480328), The Royal Green Jackets.
- Major David Martin Holloway, M.B.E. (498301), Corps of Royal Engineers.
- Lieutenant Albert Hughes (489361), Ulster Defence Regiment
- 23955012 Warrant Officer Class II James Thomas Hughes, The Parachute Regiment
- 24205389 Private Malcolm Moffitt Hunter, Ulster Defence Regiment.
- 24199881 Sergeant John Gerald Hugh Johnston, Ulster Defence Regiment.
- Major Robert Nigel Kendell (495633), Royal Tank Regiment.
- Major John Edward Francis Kirby (488457), Royal Corps of Signals.
- 24277666 Corporal (now acting Staff Sergeant) David Knowles, Corps of Royal Engineers.
- Captain Richard Alfred Leonard (512352), Corps of Royal Engineers.
- 24177109 Staff Sergeant Andrew Martin Lewis, Intelligence Corps.
- Major Phillip Lilleyman (496522), Corps of Royal Engineers.
- 24616915 Corporal Bruce Alexander Martin, Royal Army Ordnance Corps.
- 24135480 Sergeant Harold John Matthews, The Royal Green Jackets.
- Lieutenant (acting Captain) Susan Anne Mawby (514345), Women's Royal Army Corps.
- 24158270 Staff Sergeant Francis McCartney, Ulster Defence Regiment.
- 24280804 Corporal Robert McCluney, Ulster Defence Regiment
- Major Norman Oswald Miller, M.B.E. (494091), Intelligence Corps.
- Colonel William Michael Morgan (443514), Staff late Royal Regiment of Artillery.
- 24334620 Sergeant (now Staff Sergeant) Paul Alan Myers, The Royal Regiment of Fusiliers.
- 24314110 Sergeant Peter Parnell, The Prince of Wales's Own Regiment of Yorkshire.
- Captain Nigel Denton Rees (496855), Royal Army Ordnance Corps.
- Lieutenant Colonel Keith Emerson Reid (470889), Army Air Corps.
- Lieutenant Colonel John George Reith (488478), The Parachute Regiment
- Major Gordon Terence Robey (485814), The Green Howards (Alexandra, Princess of Wales's Own Yorkshire Regiment).
- 24199021 Sergeant George Ross, Ulster Defence Regi- ment
- Lieutenant Colonel Roger Charles Smith (470155), Royal Corps of Transport.
- 24208846 Sergeant William John Sproule, Ulster Defence Regiment.
- Major Simon Roger Stanford-Tuck (486744), The Royal Green Jackets.
- Lieutenant Colonel Michael Rex Stephenson (474065), Royal Corps of Signals.
- 24099957 Staff Sergeant Bernard Joseph Swift, Q.G.M., The Parachute Regiment.
- Major George Frederick Tomlin (492718), The Royal Anglian Regiment
- Major John Vickers (487596), Royal Army Ordnance Corps.
- 24314744 Sergeant Matthew David Whitfield, Corps of Royal Electrical and Mechanical Engineers.
- 24346594 Sergeant Thomas Cassidy Wright, Royal Corps of Transport

== See also ==
- 2021 Special Honours
- 2020 Special Honours
- 2019 Special Honours
- 2018 Special Honours
- 2017 Special Honours
- 1993 Special Honours
- 1991 Special Honours
- 1989 Special Honours
- 1987 Special Honours
- 1982 Special Honours
- 1974 Special Honours
- 1973 Special Honours
