= 1972 Special Honours =

British government recognitions

As part of the British honours system, Special Honours are issued at the Monarch's pleasure at any given time. The Special Honours refer to the awards made within royal prerogative, operational honours and other honours awarded outside the New Years Honours and Birthday Honours.

== Life Peer ==
=== Baronesses ===
- Diana Louie Elles, Member of the Women's National Advisory Committee of the Conservative Party. Member of the Judicial Commission of the European Union of Women since 1956. Member of the Cripps Committee on legal discrimination against women, 1968-69.

=== Barons ===
- Lieutenant-Colonel The Right Honourable Sir Michael Edward Adeane, G.C.B., G.C.V.O., Private Secretary to The Queen and Keeper of Her Majesty's Archives.
- The Right Honourable John Archibald Boyd-Carpenter, M.P., Member of Parliament for Kingston-upon-Thames since 1945. Chairman designate of the Civil Aviation Authority.
- Marshal of the Royal Air Force Sir Samuel Charles Elworthy, G.C.B., C.B.E., D.S.O., M.V.O., D.F.C., A.F.C., Chief of the Defence Staff 1967-71. Constable and Governor of Windsor Castle since 1971.
- Charles Leslie Hale, Member of Parliament for Oldham, Lancashire, 1945-50; and for the West Division of Oldham, 1950-68.
- Sir Thomas Clyde Hewlett, C.B.E., Chairman, Executive Committee of the National Union of Conservative and Unionist Associations since 1965. Deputy Chairman and Managing Director, Anchor Chemical Company Ltd.
- Sir Frederic Seebohm, T.D., Chairman, Joseph Rowntree Memorial Trust; National Institute for Social Work Training; Seebohm Committee on Local Authority and Allied Personal Social Services. Director of Barclays Bank Ltd. since 1947.
- Tudor Elwyn Watkins, Member of Parliament for Brecon and Radnor, 1945-70; Alderman of Breconshire County Council since 1940; Member of the Countryside Commission since 1970.

== Most Excellent Order of the British Empire ==
Ribbon bar of the Order of the British Empire (Military)

Ribbon bar of the Order of the British Empire (Civil)

=== Commander of the Order of the British Empire (CBE) ===
Military Division

Army

- Brigadier Frank Edward Kitson, O.B.E, M.C. (362061), late Infantry.

=== Officer of the Order of the British Empire (OBE) ===
Military Division

Army

- Lieutenant-Colonel Edward Arthur Burgess (393092), Royal Regiment of Artillery.
- Lieutenant-Colonel Kenneth Dodson (393120), The Queen's Regiment.
- Lieutenant-Colonel Geoffrey Hugh Whitby Howlett, M.C. (411979), The Parachute Regiment.
- Lieutenant-Colonel Charles Richard Huxtable, M.B.E. (420858), The Duke of Wellington's Regiment (West Riding).
- Lieutenant-Colonel Roy Lindsay Jackson (403501), The Royal Anglian Regiment.
- Lieutenant-Colonel (Acting) Brian William Reginald Pearson (390237), Royal Regiment of Artillery.
- Lieutenant-Colonel Derek Wilford (427792), The Parachute Regiment.

=== Member of the Order of the British Empire (MBE) ===
Military Division

Royal Navy

- Lieutenant Commander Cornelius Glanton.

Army

- Major James Paget Barden (426819), Royal Regiment of Artillery.
- Captain Richard Charles John Britton (471657) The Parachute Regiment.
- Major David Vernham Child, The Corps of Royal Marines.
- 22982113 Warrant Officer Class II Arnold Fothergill, The Light Infantry.
- 21126050 Warrant Officer Class I Alan Conway Graham, Royal Army Ordnance Corps.
- Major Peter Walter Graham (451249), The Gordon Highlanders.
- Lieutenant (acting Captain) Christopher Ross Maguire Kemball (479976), The Royal Green Jackets.
- 22820897 Warrant Officer Class I Terrence Bernard Latham, The Green Howards.
- Captain (Quartermaster) William Thomas Lesson (479591), Royal Corps of Signals.
- Major Anthony Makepeace-Warne (458344), The Light Infantry.
- Major David Falcon Mallam (455060), Royal Tank Regiment.
- Captain Anthony Rowland Redwood-Davies (476625), The Duke of Wellington's Regiment (West Riding).
- Captain (Acting) Alistair David Roberts (479979), The Duke of Wellington's Regiment (West Riding).
- Captain George Frank Smythe (488094), The Royal Green Jackets.
- Major Nicholas Charles Thompson, The Corps of Royal Marines.
- The Reverend Gerard Edward Weston, Chaplain to the Forces Fourth Class (483415), Royal Army Chaplain's Department.
- Major William Nuttall Wren (455127), The Queen's Regiment.

== George Medal (GM) ==
Royal Navy

- Ordnance Electrical Artificer First Class David Arthur Guest, P/MX 888978

Army

- Captain Alan Ian Clouter (471223), Royal Army Ordnance Corps.
- 23876213 Sergeant Anthony Ernest Dedman, Royal Army Ordnance Corps.
- 22805546 Warrant Officer Class II Terence John Green, Royal Army Ordnance Corps.
- Captain Derek Markham (470112), Royal Army Ordnance Corps.
- Captain (Acting) Roger Frederick Mendham (483984), Royal Army Ordnance Corps.

== British Empire Medal for Gallantry (BEM) ==
Royal Navy

- Acting Leading Marine Engineering Mechanic Donald Patrick Beckett, P.083664
- Leading Marine Engineering Mechanic Robert Charles Croxon, P.083266
- Marine Engineering Mechanic Ian Stuart Ralphs, P. 097609

Army

- 23825367 Sergeant Roger Bernard Crisp, Royal Army Ordnance Corps.
- 23236216 Sergeant George Forsyth, The Light Infantry.
- 23971849 Corporal James Malon McKinley, Corps of Royal Military Police.

== British Empire Medal (BEM) ==
- 23247476 Staff Sergeant Peter George Allsop, Corps of Royal Military Police.
- 23873416 Sergeant (Acting) Geoffrey Deveroux, The Parachute Regiment.
- 23951416 Sergeant (Acting) Leslie Ingham, The Queen's Regiment.
- 23974516 Corporal James Francis Wilson, The Royal Scots Dragoon Guards (Carabiniers and Greys)

== Distinguished Service Order (DSO) ==
- Lieutenant-Colonel Ronald Eccles (397232), The Green Howards.
- Lieutenant-Colonel Roland Kelvin Guy, M.B.E. (397265), The Royal Green Jackets.
- Lieutenant-Colonel Richard Mayfield (403568), Scots Guards.
- Lieutenant-Colonel Richard Frederick Vincent (417555), Royal Regiment of Artillery.

== Military Cross (MC) ==
- Lieutenant Clifford Lowis Burrage (488399), The Green Howards.
- Lieutenant Desmond Patrick Cangley (481744), The Gloucestershire Regiment.
- Major Ian Douglas Corden-Lloyd (457134), The Royal Green Jackets.
- Major Christopher Campbell Dunphie (443428), The Royal Green Jackets.
- Captain Julian John Finch Field (473943), The Devonshire and Dorset Regiment.
- Major Brian Charles Mellows Harding (426898), Royal Regiment of Artillery.
- 2nd Lieutenant John Taylor Holmes (489540), Scots Guards.
- 2nd Lieutenant Anthony Kynaston Jacques (490125), Coldstream Guards.
- Major Peter Maurice Kingston (426927), The Parachute Regiment.
- Major Robert George Long (448172), The Royal Hampshire Regiment.
- Major (Acting) John Michael Anthony Nurton (469066), Scots Guards.
- Captain Frank Ronald Sainsbury (488556), The Royal Green Jackets.
- Second-Lieutenant Michael Smith (490556), The Royal Green Jackets.
- Lieutenant William Barry Stevens (483827), Royal Regiment of Artillery.
- Major Mathew John Anthony Wilson, M.B.E. (451349), The Light Infantry.
- 2nd Lieutenant Simon John Young (487863), The Royal Green Jackets.

== Distinguished Conduct Medal (DCM) ==
- 22955109 Sergeant Derek John Harmon, Corps of Royal Military Police.
- 24114640 Corporal Thomas William Thompson, The Royal Green Jackets.

== Military Medal (MM) ==
- 24076879 Lance Sergeant (Acting) Alan Leslie Ball, Scots Guards.
- 24113581 Bombardier Henryk Adam Barczynski, Royal Regiment of Artillery.
- 23597366 Staff Sergeant (Acting) Keith Bridgeman, Corps of Royal Military Police.
- 23878845 Colour Sergeant Edmund Bright, The Royal Green Jackets.
- 24035872 Corporal Michael John Brook, The Green Howards (Alexandra, Princess of Wales's "Own Yorkshire Regiment).
- 24121327 Private Paul Stewart Burlace, The Parachute Regiment.
- 24070418 Private Colin James Butler, The Queen's Regiment.
- RM 23000 Corporal Keith Callaghan, The Corps of Royal Marines.
- 23697027 Corporal Carl Robert Chinn, The Queen's Regiment.
- 24074068 Corporal Graham Crossland, The Green Howards.
- 24026343 Corporal Eugene William Fisher, The Green Howards.
- 24076698 Guardsman Ian Glendenning, Cbldstream Guards.
- 23999989 Lance Corporal David Grant, The Royal Green Jackets
- 23530537 Sergeant James Dennis Hughes, The Royal Scots Dragoon Guards (Cairabiniers and Greys).
- 23873459 Corporal Brian Tegg, The Parachute Regiment.
- 23832081 Sergeant Robert John Henry Thompson, Royal Regiment of Artillery.
- 23726903 Corporal Peter Bernard Webb, 14th/20th Kings Hussars.
- 23883534 Sergeant Andrew Robb Welsh, The Parachute Regiment.
- 24031479 Corporal Clive Graham Williams, Corps of Royal Military Police.
- 24179013 Sapper Alan Grant Young, Corps of Royal Engineers.

== Mentioned in Despatches ==
Palm of the Mentioned in Despatches

Army

- Lieutenant Jonathan Harvey Glynne Allen (480761), Scots Guards.
- 23923683 Sergeant Kenneth Clifford Ambrose, The Royal Green Jackets.
- 24110498 Corporal David John Barker, The Royal Green Jackets.
- 22251303 Staff Sergeant John Beattie, Royal Army Ordnance Corps.
- Major Raymond Bell (439947), Royal Corps of Signals
- 23734173 Sergeant Roger Lambert Bentley, Royal Tank Regiment.
- Second-Lieutenant Keith Best (489892), The Duke of Wellington's Regiment (West Riding).
- 24078568 Corporal Richard Francis Bridgeman, The Devonshire and Dorset Regiment.
- 22309015 Warrant Officer Class II Kenneth Alan Butler, The Light Infantry.
- 24037741 Corporal Patrick Roger Butler, The Parachute Regiment.
- 23871047 Lance Corporal William Liddle Caldwell, The Queen's Regiment.
- Major Bernard Charles Calledene (415727), Royal Army Ordnance Corps (died of wounds).
- Colonel Kenneth John Carter (343118), late Infantry.
- Lieutenant Christopher George Frank Charter (484829), The Queen's Regiment.
- 2nd Lieutenant John Clarke-Beven (488786), The Royal Scots Dragoon Guards (Carabiniers and Greys).
- 22215814 Warrant Officer Class II Robert Titus Clarkson, Scots Guards.
- 24093491 Lance Corporal David James Cleary, The Parachute Regiment.
- Lieutenant The Honourable Thomas Hugh John Clifford (483788), Coldstream Guards.
- 24180769 Private Ronald Alan Cook, The Parachute Regiment.
- 23856749 Sergeant Paul Frank Copson, The Parachute Regiment
- 24011193 Bombardier Brian Cyril Corser, Royal Regiment of Artillery.
- Second Lieutenant James Averell Daniell (487268), The Royal Green Jackets.
- 24064491 Private Michael Rosslyn Dawes, The Gloucestershire Regiment.
- Lieutenant Anthony Brian Christopher Dollard (488419), The Royal Green Jackets.
- 24074476 Private Phillip Barry Donegan, The Green Howards.
- 24146397 Lance Corporal Peter Scott Eliot, The Queen's Regiment.
- 24213093 Rifleman John McAleese Ferrier, The Royal Green Jackets.
- 23977671 Corporal Colin Fleming, The Duke of Wellington's Regiment (West Riding).
- 24205389 Private Thomas John Fletcher, Ulster Defence Regiment (died of wounds).
- 23951516 Sergeant Dennis James Foran, The Royal Anglian Regiment.
- Major Peter David France (393005), Army Catering Corps.
- 23835673 Bombardier Colin Gillespie, The Royal Regiment of Artillery.
- 24049033 Corporal Anthony Goddard, The Duke of Wellington's Regiment (West Riding).
- 22960504 Warrant Officer Class II Maurice John Goodby, The Royal Hussars (Prince of Wales's Own).
- RM 24789 Marine Frank Edward Green, Royal Marines.
- 24210929 Rifleman John Henry Hanna, The Royal Green Jackets.
- 24053542 Corporal Thomas Henry Hansford, The Royal Green Jackets.
- Captain Enrol Kenneth Harries (470080), Royal Corps of Transport.
- 24067551 Lance Bombardier James Alexander Harrison, Royal Regiment of Artillery.
- 2nd Lieutenant Ronald Janusz Heath (490518), The Light Infantry.
- Major Clinton Lionel Guy Grant Henshaw (448979), The Royal Green Jackets.
- 24122734 Lance Corporal Joseph Hill, The Parachute Regiment.
- Major Percy George Hill (471991), Royal Regiment of Artillery.
- Lieutenant Simon Patrick Hill, The Corps of Royal Marines.
- 23921367 Sergeant Keith Malcolm Jeffery, Corps of Royal Engineers.
- 23974251 Corporal James Johnson, Royal Tank Regiment.
- Major John Francis Jones (332218), Ulster Defence Regiment.
- 24101389 Private Gerald Martin Kelly, The Duke of Wellington's Regiment (West Riding).
- 24156258 Sapper John Lavender, Corps of Royal Engineers.
- 23888972 Lance Bombardier Thomas Lewis, The Royal Regiment of Artillery.
- 24088074 Corporal Anthony Paul Frederick Liggins, The Light Infantry.
- 24090503 Lance Corporal Keith Lister, The Duke of Wellington's Regiment (West Riding).
- 24128633 Corporal Paul Leslie Ludbrook, The Royal Anglian Regiment
- 23909357 Sergeant Murdo Alexander Macdonald, Queen's Own Highlanders (Seaforth and Camerons).
- 2nd Lieutenant Nicholas Marden (492704), The Devonshire and Dorset Regiment.
- 24187075 Private Peter Ambrose Matthews, The Parachute Regiment.
- 23730471 Staff/Sergeant Alexander James McCrea, Royal Army Ordnance Corps.
- 23732830 Sergeant John McPherson, Royal Regiment of Artillery.
- 24096978 Guardsman Stephen George McRonald, Scots Guards.
- 2nd Lieutenant Brian Anthony McSwiney (489919), The Royal Scots Dragoon Guards (Carabiniers and Greys).
- 23504596 Warrant Officer Class II Clarence William Millington, The Parachute Regiment
- 23860235 Corporal Timothy Michael Murray, Corps of Royal Engineers.
- 24104808 Lance Corporal Clive John Newham, The Queen's Regiment.
- 23855815 Sergeant John O'Brien, The Green Howards.
- Lieutenant-Colonel Peter Harry Bedford O'Meara (412027), The Queen's Lancashire Regiment.
- 23989572 Rifleman Michael John O'Shea, The Royal Green Jackets.
- Lieutenant Anthony Malcolm Douglas Palmer (487557), The Royal Green Jackets.
- 24154165 Corporal (acting Sergeant) Ian Michael George Parfitt, The Royal Green Jackets.
- 24009326 Lance Corporal Colin John Parker, Corps of Royal Engineers.
- 23868183 Sergeant (acting Colour Sergeant) Ronald Paterson, Scots Guards.
- 23204240 Staff Sergeant Dennis Gilbert Poynter, The Parachute Regiment.
- Second Lieutenant John Ronald William Pullinger (490374), The Parachute Regiment.
- 2nd Lieutenant Charles John Lavallin Puxley (489202), The Royal Green Jackets.
- RM21822 Corporal Richard Gordon Quirk, The Corps of Royal Marines.
- Lieutenant Michael Richard Raworth (488476), Royal Regiment of Artillery.
- 23921965 Sergeant James Joseph Regan, The Royal Regiment of Fusiliers.
- 23769630 Corporal Bryan Roy Rolf, Corps of Royal Military Police.
- 24146498 Lance Corporal Paul Gary Roy, The Queen's Regiment.
- Major Alexander Norman McLeod Scott (455179), The Gordon Highlanders.
- Captain Selwyn Charles Seelhoff (485088), Royal Scots Dragoon Guards.
- 24064507 Corporal Jeffery Walter Seeney, The Royal Green Jackets.
- 24141537 Guardsman Kevin Shepherd, Coldstream Guards.
- 23745466 Corporal (acting Sergeant) Charles Peter Slocombe, The Royal Green Jackets.
- 23855400 Colour Sergeant Roy Smith, The Royal Anglian Regiment.
- Major Jeremy James Elliott Snow (445978), Royal Regiment of Fusiliers. (Died of wounds).
- 24048502 Lance Corporal James Ward Speirs, Scots Guards.
- 24173795 Guardsman Richard John Spring, Coldstream Guards.
- Lieutenant Colonel Joseph Nigel Stisted (420930), The Royal Scots (The Royal Regiment).
- 24185476 Guardsman Michael Anthony Sullivan, Coldstream Guards.
- 23663022 Sergeant Christopher Colin Tottman, 14th/20th Kings Hussars.
- Lieutenant-Colonel Greville Wyndham Tufnell (424492), Grenadier Guards.
- 23701103 Colour Sergeant David Sydney Wade, The Royal Anglian Regiment.
- Lieutenant Edward Charles Walshaw (484964), The Royal Regiment of Artillery.
- 22823091 Sergeant Samuel Geoffrey Ward, Corps of Royal Electrical and Mechanical Engineers.
- 24252215 Gunner Thomas Raymond Weir, Royal Regiment of Artillery.
- Captain Peter John Williams (479387), Corps of Royal Engineers.
- 19044361 Warrant Officer Class II William Williams, The Royal Regiment of Artillery.
- Lieutenant Edward Anthony Woods (485931), Scots Guards.
- 23850347 Corporal Gordon Francis Yates, Corps of Royal Military Police.

Royal Air Force

- Master Signaller Michael John Carter (SO585360), Royal Air Force.
- JO572977 Flight Sergeant Robert Swift, B.E.M., Royal Air Force.

== Queen's Commendation for Brave Conduct ==
- E8083312 Senior Aircraftman James Johnson, Royal Air Force.

== See also ==
- 2021 Special Honours
- 2020 Special Honours
- 2019 Special Honours
- 2018 Special Honours
- 2017 Special Honours
- 1993 Special Honours
- 1991 Special Honours
- 1974 Special Honours
- 1973 Special Honours
