= 1983 Special Honours =

British government recognitions

As part of the British honours system, Special Honours are issued at the Monarch's pleasure at any given time. The Special Honours refer to the awards made within royal prerogative, operational honours and other honours awarded outside the New Years Honours and Birthday Honours.

== Knight Bachelor ==
Knight's Bachelor ribbon

- The Right Honourable Neil Marten, M.P.
- The Honourable Mr. Justice (Donald James) Nicholls
- The Honourable Mr. Justice (Philip Howard) Otton.
- The Honourable Mr. Justice (Oliver Bury) Popplewell.

== Order of the Bath ==
Ribbon bar of the Order of the Bath

=== Knight Commander of the Bath (KCB) ===
- The Right Honourable John William Frederic Nott, M.P.

== Royal Victorian Order ==
Royal Victorian Order ribbon

=== Knight Grand Cross of the Royal Victorian Order (GCVO) ===
- Sir Florizel Augustus Glasspole, G.C.M.G.

=== Knight Commander of the Royal Victorian Order (KCVO) ===
- Crispin Charles Cervantes Tickell, M.V.O.

=== Commander of the Royal Victorian Order (CVO) ===
- John Lewis Beaven, M.V.O.
- George Ferguson Finlayson, C.M.G.
- The Honourable Dennis Haley Foster, C.B.E.
- George Peter Lloyd, C.M.G.
- Neville Haig Smith, M.V.O.
- Lawrence James Wallace.

=== Member of the Royal Victorian Order, 4th Class (LVO) ===
- Charles Vernon Anson.
- Kenneth Chaplin.
- Donald Ewart Davidson.
- Commander David Leonard Deakin, Royal Navy.
- Michael Edward Frost.
- Graham Leslie Minter.
- Herman Ricketts.
- John Stephen Wall.

=== Member of the Royal Victorian Order, 5th Class (MVO) ===
- Major John Everett Prescod.

== Royal Victorian Medal ==
Royal Victorian Medal ribbon

=== Silver ===
- Sergeant Buel Ebanks.

== Most Excellent Order of the British Empire ==
Ribbon bar of the Order of the British Empire (Civil)

Ribbon bar of the Order of the British Empire (Military)

=== Commander of the Order of the British Empire (CBE) ===
Military Division

Army

- Colonel Dennis Shaw, O.B.E. (448646), Staff, late Corps of Royal Electrical and Mechanical Engineers.

=== Officer of the Order of the British Empire (OBE) ===
Military Division

Army

- Lieutenant-Colonel Ian McLeod, M.C. (469053), The Parachute Regiment.
- Lieutenant-Colonel David John Venn (470165), Intelligence Corps.

=== Member of the Order of the British Empire (MBE) ===
Military Division

Army

- Captain Stephen Ritohieson Brown (498144), Royal Army Ordnance Corps.
- Major John Nelson Gunson, G.M. (482746), Royal Array Ordnance Corps.
- Major Julian Arthur Seymour Lancaster (483804), Scots Guards.
- Major Thomas Longland (485774), The Royal Anglian Regiment.
- Major Peter Peregrine Rawlinson (481846), The Royal Anglian Regiment.

== Queen's Gallantry Medal (QGM) ==
Ribbon bar of the Queen's Gallantry Medal

- 24100659 Staff Sergeant Robert McKenzie, Intelligence Corps.
- 24012801 Sergeant Peter Harry Simpkins, Q.G.M, Royal Tank Regiment
- 24083057 Colour Sergeant John McGregor Simpson, The Parachute Regiment
- 23733814 Warrant Officer Class 1 David Walker, Royal Army Ordnance Corps.

== British Empire Medal (BEM) ==
Ribbon bar of the British Empire Medal (Military)

- 24310037 Lance Corporal (Acting Corporal—now substantive Corporal) George Richard Burrows, Q.G.M., Royal Corps of Signals.
- 24146530 Colour Sergeant Kevin William Carberry, The Royal Regiment of Fusiliers.
- 23914661 Staff Sergeant Michael Anthony Christy, Corps of Royal Engineers.
- 24158506 Sergeant George Phillip Corcoran, Q.G.M., 4th/7th Royal Dragoon Guards.
- 24168485 Sergeant (now Acting Staff Sergeant) William John Downs, Corps of Royal Engineers.
- 24111323 Sergeant James Gallagher, The Royal Scots (The Royal Regiment).
- 24262662 Sergeant Michael Raymond Glazer, Q.G.M., Royal Regiment of Artillery.
- 24154719 Sergeant (Acting Colour Sergeant Alan Howarth, The Light Infantry.
- 23864898 Sergeant Brian Arthur Longney, Corps of Royal Military Police.
- 24080558 Colour Sergeant (now Warrant Officer Class 2) James McBride, The Royal Regiment of Fusiliers.
- 24099732 Colour Sergeant (Acting Warrant Officer Class 2) Kenneth William Taylor, The Royal Anglian Regiment.
- 22999484 Staff Sergeant (Acting Warrant Officer Class 2) James Walkden, Corps of Royal Electrical and Mechanical Engineers.

== Polar Medal ==
Ribbon bar of the Polar Medal

- Douglas George Allan, Scientific Diver to 1981. For outstanding services as members of the British Antarctic Survey - 5 April 1983.
- Stuart James Lawrence, Ships Master to 1981. For outstanding services as members of the British Antarctic Survey - 5 April 1983.
- David Michael Rootes, Base Commander to 1981. For outstanding services as members of the British Antarctic Survey - 5 April 1983.

== Distinguished Conduct Medal (DCM) ==
Ribbon bar of the Distinguished Conduct Medal

- 24146715 Sergeant John Michael Robinson, The Parachute Regiment

== Mentioned in Despatches ==
Palm of the Mentioned in Despatches

- Captain Christopher Robert Bradley (499586), Royal Army Ordnance Corps.
- 23913984 Warrant Officer Class 1 Mervyn John Chapman, Royal Army Ordnance Corps.
- Lieutenant Robin Gilbert Arthur Cope (504912), The Royal Anglian Regiment.
- Major Richard Paul Cousens (487468), The Light Infantry.
- Lieutenant Colonel Michael Humphrey Dry Drury, M.B.E. (473934), The Light Infantry.
- 23943452 Staff Sergeant (Acting Warrant Officer Class 2) Martin Patrick George Fitzgerald, Q.G.M., The Light Infantry.
- 24321634 Corporal (now Sergeant) Andrew Simon Gerrard, The Royal Regiment of Fusiliers.
- 23955254 Corporal Dermot Malcolm Fergus Giles, Royal Tank Regiment.
- 24212037 Sergeant Alexander William Gunn, Royal Corps of Transport
- 24279118 Corporal Michael Haley, The Royal Green Jackets.
- 24355125 Corporal Edward Reginald Harris, The Royal Hampshire Regiment.
- Lieutenant-Colonel Robert Ian Lorraine Ker (461460), The Black Watch (Royal Highland Regiment).
- Captain Keith Walter Kiddie (498070), The Royal Regiment of Fusiliers.
- 23987399 Warrant Officer Class 2 John Edward Knight, Royal Army Ordnance Corps.
- 24298045 Corporal (now Sergeant) Kenneth William Lindon, The Light Infantry.
- Captain Michael John Lock (506438), Royal Army Pay Corps.
- 24080549 Lance Corporal James Christopher Malcolmson, The Parachute Regiment.
- Major Robert McCartney (490109), Ulster Defence Regiment
- 24203651 Corporal (Acting Sergeant) John Gibb McCubbin, The Royal Scots (The Royal Regiment).
- 24127657 Staff Sergeant Ernest William Morgan, The Parachute Regiment.
- Major Michael John Rescorle (501056), The Light Infantry.
- 24351750 Corporal Kevin Francis Ryan, The Parachute Regiment.
- 23924563 Corpoal Matin Archibald Shedden, The Royal Green Jackets.
- 24093180 Warrant Officer Class 2 Hugh Dalton Smith, The Royal Anglian Regiment
- 24228128 Sergeant; Andrew George Swanson, B.E.M., The Devonshire and Dorset Regiment
- 24191119 Corporal Peter Raymond Thomas, Corps of Royal Military Police.
- 24010081 Corporal Gordon Thursfield, Royal Corps of Signals.
- 24274235 Corporal Ronald Waters, The Royal Regiment of Fusiliers.
- Major Julian Michael Baring Whitehead (480658), Intelligence Corps.
- Major David John Wray (489355), Ulster Defence Regiment

== See also ==
- 2021 Special Honours
- 2020 Special Honours
- 2019 Special Honours
- 2018 Special Honours
- 2017 Special Honours
- 1993 Special Honours
- 1991 Special Honours
- 1974 Special Honours
- 1973 Special Honours
