= 1979 Special Honours =

British government recognitions

As part of the British honours system, Special Honours are issued at the Monarch's pleasure at any given time. The Special Honours refer to the awards made within royal prerogative, operational honours and other honours awarded outside the New Years Honours and Birthday Honours.

== Life peerage ==
- Sir Bernard Miles CBE; to be Baron Miles, of Blackfriars in the City of London – 9 February 1979

== Most Excellent Order of the British Empire ==
=== Commander of the Order of the British Empire (CBE) ===
Military Division

Army

- Colonel John Malcolm Cubiss, MC (400455), late The Prince of Wales's Own Regiment of Yorkshire.

=== Officer of the Order of the British Empire (OBE) ===
Military Division

Army

- Lieutenant-Colonel William Thomas Dodd, MBE (451227), The Royal Anglian Regiment.
- Lieutenant-Colonel Simon David Anson Firth, MBE (461422), The Gloucestershire Regiment.
- Lieutenant-Colonel Roger St. Clair Preston (443540), The Light Infantry.
- Lieutenant-Colonel Mathew John Anthony Wilson, MBE, MC (451349), The Light Infantry.

=== Member of the Order of the British Empire (MBE) ===
Military Division

Army

- Captain Allan Edward Black (498322), Intelligence Corps.
- Major Thomas John Doonan (140326), Ulster Defence Regiment.
- Major Adrian John Harcourt Hughes (463356), The Royal Regiment of Fusiliers.
- Major Timothy Bruce Owen (467075), Royal Army Ordnance Corps.
- Major Timothy Laurence Murray Porter (471653), The Royal Welch Fusiliers.
- Major (Quartermaster) John Edward Stone (485259), The Worcestershire and Sherwood Foresters Regiment (29th/45th Foot).
- Major Mathew Smyth (377277), Ulster Defence Regiment.

== Queen's Gallantry Medal (QGM) ==
- 24056585 Corporal of Horse John Edward Brammer, The Life Guards.
- 24171993 Sergeant Colin Terence Brooks, The Parachute Regiment.
- 24092429 Staff Sergeant George Robert Ferguson, Royal Army Ordnance Corps.
- 24214060 Lance Bombardier (Acting Bombardier) Ian James Girvin, Royal Regiment of Artillery.
- 24068812 Staff Sergeant Andrew Shoemaker, Royal Army Ordnance Corps.
- 24048438 Sergeant Stephen James Williamson, Scots Guards.

== British Empire Medal (BEM) ==
Military Division

- Sergeant David James McDowall, P023444X, Royal Marines.
- Corporal Peter John Bloom, P02S789T, Royal Marines.
- 23868323 Sergeant Allan Finney, Ulster Defence Regiment.
- W/458393 Lance Corporal (Acting Corporal) Elizabeth Marion Linne, Women's Royal Army Corps.
- 23967499 Sergeant William John Mawhinney, The King's Own Royal Border Regiment.
- 24273545 Sergeant (Acting Staff Sergeant) Phillip James Morrison, Ulster Defence Regiment.
- 24125385 Sergeant (Acting Staff Sergeant) Richard Andrew James Phasey, Grenadier Guards.

== Air Force Cross (AFC) ==
- Flight Lieutenant Ross Payne (4231693), Royal Air Force.
- Major Denzil Goulding Sharp (479342), Army Air Corps.

== Queen's Commendation for Brave Conduct ==
- Second Lieutenant Michael John Butler (507644), Ulster Defence Regiment.
- U4284041 Sergeant Howard John Dowding, Royal Air Force.
- 21159941 Lance Corporal Swiba Lepcha, Queen's Gurkha Signals.
- Captain Anthony Michael Duncan McKechnie (492706), Royal Regiment of Artillery.

== Queen's Commendation for Valuable Service in the Air ==
- 23835849 Staff Sergeant Michael Stephen Edwards, Army Air Corps.
- Lieutenant Ian Vernon Munday, Royal Navy.
- Leading Aircrewman Raymond John Walters, D097527E.

== Mentioned in Despatches ==
- 24033494 Staff Sergeant John Edward Atkinson, The Light Infantry.
- 24254193 Lance Corporal Kevin Rodney Batten, The Gloucestershire Regiment.
- 23472009 Warrant Officer Class 1 Peter William Budden, Army Catering Corps.
- Major Keith Richard Burnett (443408), Intelligence Corps.
- 23826564 Staff Sergeant (Acting Warrant Officer Class 2) Jack Burris, Royal Corps of Transport.
- Lieutenant-Colonel Mark Mackenzie Carnegie-Brown (454996), Scots Guards.
- Lieutenant Duncan William Chattin (506789), Corps of Royal Electrical and Mechanical Engineers.
- Major Richard Stephen Clayton (482237), Royal Regiment of Artillery.
- Captain David Frederick Meredith Collyer (496353), Royal Corps of Signals.
- Major Charles John Crow (455005), Royal Corps of Signals.
- Major Christopher Geoffrey Deedes (475136), The Light Infantry.
- Lieutenant Jonathan Mark Ellison, Royal Navy.
- Sergeant Paul John Evans, P022130Q, Royal Marines.
- 23943452 Sergeant (Acting Staff Sergeant) Martin Patrick George Fitzgerald, Q.G.M., The Light Infantry.
- 24037366 Staff Sergeant David Norman Goble, Intelligence Corps.
- Colonel David Hancock, M.B.E. (430314), late The Light Infantry.
- 24280126 Staff Sergeant Maxwell Ivan Hanlon, Ulster Defence Regiment.
- 24091319 Staff Sergeant Allan Mackay Hare, Intelligence Corps.
- Warrant Officer 2 Malcolm Harold Harris, P020555R, Royal Marines.
- Captain Michael Richard Harris (489536), 15th/19th The King's Royal Hussars.
- 24425461 Lance Corporal Peter David Hartley (now discharged), The Parachute Regiment.
- Lieutenant-Colonel Robert John Hodges, M.B.E. (451264), The King's Own Royal Border Regiment.
- 24026658 Sergeant (Acting Staff Sergeant) Trevor Kenneth Jacobs, The Light Infantry.
- Captain Maxwell Kerley (492959), Royal Army Ordnance Corps.
- Lieutenant-Colonel Clive Brereton Lea-Cox (430362) (now retired), The Duke of Edinburgh's Royal Regiment (Berkshire and Wiltshire).
- 24208347 Private (Acting Lance Corporal) James Mcllva Lees, The Ulster Defence Regiment.
- 23922123 Sergeant Errol Tyrone Lewis, Army Catering Corps.
- 24377517 Lance Corporal Thomas William Mathews, Ulster Defence Regiment.
- 24369205 Signalman Ian Robert Millar, Royal Corps of Signals.
- 24100659 Sergeant (Acting Staff Sergeant) Robert McKenzie, Corps of Royal Electrical and Mechanical Engineers.
- Major John Michael Anthony Nurton, M.C. (469066), Scots Guards.
- 24216338 Lance Corporal Liam Francis O'Hare, Ulster Defence Regiment.
- 23461330 Warrant Officer Class 2 (Acting Warrant Officer Class 1) William O'Leary, Royal Corps of Transport.
- Captain David Alasdair Machray Park (494556), Corps of Royal Engineers.
- Lieutenant-Colonel John Axel Pharo-Tomlin (437139), 14th/20th King's Hussars.
- 24275615 Corporal George Thomas Sampson, Ulster Defence Regiment.
- 24062707 Sergeant John Starrs, Royal Army Ordnance Corps.
- 23780641 Warrant Officer Class 1 Ian Streeter, Royal Corps of Transport.
- 24205624 Sergeant Malachy Sweeny, The Ulster Defence Regiment.
- 24273004 Private James Irvine Topping, The Ulster Defence Regiment.
- Captain Martin Spencer Vine (495248), The Gloucestershire Regiment.
- 23729527 Warrant Officer Class 2 EIrick George Young, Royal Corps of Transport.

== See also ==
- 2021 Special Honours
- 2020 Special Honours
- 2019 Special Honours
- 2018 Special Honours
- 2017 Special Honours
- 1993 Special Honours
- 1991 Special Honours
- 1982 Special Honours
- 1974 Special Honours
- 1973 Special Honours
