= 1989 Special Honours =

British government recognitions

As part of the British honours system, Special Honours are issued at the Monarch's pleasure at any given time. The Special Honours refer to the awards made within royal prerogative, operational honours and other honours awarded outside the New Years Honours and Birthday Honours.

== Most Excellent Order of the British Empire ==
=== Commander of the Order of the British Empire (CBE) ===
Military Division

Army

- Colonel Ronald George Silk (472619), Staff (late The Worcestershire and Sherwood Foresters Regiment (29th/45th Foot)).
- Colonel Bruce James Willing, O.B.E. (47139S), Staff, (late The Royal Hampshire Regiment).

=== Officer of the Order of the British Empire (OBE) ===
Military Division

Army

- The Reverend John Robert Bolton (482319), Chaplain to the Forces Class 2, Royal Army Chaplains' Department.
- Lieutenant Colonel David Alexander Cameron Hannah (484996), The Royal Hampshire Regiment.
- Lieutenant Colonel John Stewart Wadsworth Powell (481842), The Green Howards (Alexandra, Princess of Wales's Own Yorkshire Regiment).
- Lieutenant Colonel (now Colonel) John George Reith (488478), The Parachute Regiment.
- Lieutenant Colonel David John Ross, M.B.E. (485817), The Royal Welch Fusiliers.

=== Member of the Order of the British Empire (MBE) ===
Military Division

Army

- Major Peter Noel Bamber (513247), Corps of Royal Military Police.
- Major Mark Blatherwick (489174), Royal Army Ordnance Corps.
- Major David Norman Broadfoot (499589). The Gordon Highlanders.
- Major Roger Martin Brunt (497573), The Royal Anglian Regiment.
- 23867422 Warrant Officer Class 2 Samuel Baird Calvert, Ulster Defence Regiment.
- Major (now acting Lieutenant Colonel) Robert Jonathan Griffiths (501599), Corps of Royal Engineers.
- Major Mark Richard Gritten (493720), Corps of Royal Engineers.
- 23933407 Warrant Officer Class 1 Lawrence Leck, The Parachute Regiment.
- Captain Robert Samuel McKelvey (506466), Ulster Defence Regiment.
- Captain Jonathan David Page (512953), The Parachute Regiment.
- Captain Robert William Patterson (506427), Ulster Defence Regiment.
- Captain John Peden (504810), Ulster Defence Regiment.
- 24343377 Warrant Officer Class 2 Michael Walter Robson, Intelligence Corps.
- Major Martin Hubert Somervell (483550), Coldstream Guards.

== Air Force Cross (AFC) ==
- 24098816 Warrant Officer Class 2 Bryan John Rowsell, Army Air Corps.

== George Medal (GM) ==
- 24396795 Staff Sergeant Michael Graham Knox, Royal Army Ordnance Corps.

== Queen's Gallantry Medal (QGM) ==
- 4384479 Sergeant Delmore Alexander Britton, The Parachute Regiment.
- 24533454 Sergeant Jonathan Fraser Clarke, Royal Army Ordnance Corps.
- 245894662 Private Mark Patrick Flanigan, Ulster Defence Regiment.
- 24365472 Sub-Lieutenant Marcus Darius Khurody, Fleet Air Arm, Royal Navy.
- 24578375 Corporal Christopher Charles Gillespie, Devonshire and Dorset Regiment.
- 24319192 Sergeant Anthony Ronald Hoare, The Royal Green Jackets.
- 24395525 Staff Sergeant Shaun O'Brien, Royal Army Ordnance Corps.

== British Empire Medal (BEM) ==
Military Division

Army

- 24033305 Corporal Michael Raymond Benton, The Queen's Regiment.
- 243S70S6 Staff Sergeant (acting Warrant Officer Class 2) Kevin Clark, The Royal Regiment of Fusiliers.
- 24373456 Sergeant Kelfryn John Clement, The Royal Welch Fusiliers.
- 24140708 Staff Sergeant Colin John Foster, The Green Howards (Alexandra, Princess of Wales's Own Yorkshire Regiment).
- 24147670 Corporal Martin John Hargraves, The Royal Welch Fusiliers.
- 24119533 Staff Sergeant Peter Garreth Jones, Royal Army Ordnance Corps.
- 24449155 Sergeant Malcolm Paul Kerrigan, The Duke of Wellington's Regiment (West Riding).
- 24311106 Sergeant Andrew Reginald Popplewell, Royal Regiment of Artillery.
- F0449028 Staff Sergeant (acting Warrant Officer Class 2) Eileen Florence June Spence, Ulster Defence Regiment.
- 24414421 Corporal Kevin Townley, The Royal Regiment of Fusiliers.
- 24433349 Corporal Christopher Gordon Wallace, The Green Howards (Alexandra, Princess of Wales's Own Yorkshire Regiment).

== Mention in Despatches ==
- 24243078 Corporal George Peter Adam, Corps of Royal Engineers.
- 24498333 Corporal Ivan Jon Blacklock, The Green Howards (Alexandra, Princess of Wales's Own Yorkshire Regiment).
- Major Jonathan George Ian David Boileau Goad (496303), The Royal Welch Fusiliers.
- 24104092 Warrant Officer Class 2 David John Booth, The Light Infantry.
- 24245012 Corporal James Brown, The Green Howards (Alexandra, Princess of Wales's Own Yorkshire Regiment).
- Lieutenant Colonel John Malcolm Vincent Machines Cargin, LVO, (480263), The Royal Irish Rangers (27th (Inniskilling) 83rd and 87th).
- Lieutenant Colonel James Strickland Carter, (485195), The Royal Green Jackets.
- 24399597 Sergeant John Joseph Coleman, The Royal Regiment of Fusiliers.
- 24128807 Warrant Officer Class 2 Richard Stephen Davies, Army Air Corps.
- 24254191 Warrant Officer Class 2 John James Dineen, The Gloucestershire Regiment.
- Captain Thomas Flanagan (519590), Intelligence Corps.
- Captain Terence James Gammons (526653), The Royal Regiment of Fusiliers.
- 24443843 Bombardier John Mervin Gibson, Royal Regiment of Artillery.
- 24673705 Lance Corporal Andrew Robert Gray, Coldstream Guards.
- 24463885 Sergeant Timothy Carl Greaney, 1st The Queen's Dragoon Guards, Royal Armoured Corps.
- 24258512 Sergeant Gerald Hawkins, The Royal Welch Fusiliers.
- Captain John Harry Andrew Hawkins (507047), Royal Army Ordnance Corps.
- Major (now Lieutenant Colonel) David Leslie Haydock, M.B.E. (498265), Intelligence Corps.
- Lieutenant Colonel Shane Crisp Hearn (481791), The Royal Green Jackets.
- 24273850 Sergeant Samuel Gerald Herron, Ulster Defence Regiment.
- Lieutenant (now Captain) Donald Anthony Joyce (526827), Corps of Royal Engineers.
- 24377818 Sergeant Samuel Andrew Lowry, Ulster Defence Regiment.
- Colonel (now Brigadier) William Alan Mackereth (454311), Staff (late The Duke of Edinburgh's Royal Regiment (Berkshire and Wiltshire)).
- 24512209 Bombardier David Charles Mann, Royal Regiment of Artillery.
- 24280804 Corporal Robert McCluney, Ulster Defence Regiment.
- Major Godfrey Jason John McFall (495204), The Parachute Regiment.
- Major Helen Elizabeth McMahon (509112), Women's Royal Army Corps.
- 24632937 Corporal Matthew Ronald Mears, Corps of Royal Military Police.
- Major Trevor John Minter (495558), The Royal Regiment of Fusiliers.
- 24682407 Corporal Andrew James Monaghan, Intelligence Corps.
- 24694419 Private David Rees Morgan, The Green Howards (Alexandra, Princess of Wales's Own Yorkshire Regiment).
- 24387530 Staff Sergeant Robert Nicol, Royal Army Ordnance Corps.
- Captain David Michael Nield (515566), The Royal Welch Fusiliers.
- Captain (acting Major) Julian Fergus Panton (504959), The Green Howards (Alexandra, Princess of Wales's Own Yorkshire' Regiment).
- 24357981 Warrant Officer Class 2 David Reginald Paynter, Corps of Royal Military Police.
- Lieutenant Colonel Mitchell Hastings Philp (485804), The Light Infantry.
- Captain James Craig Preston (514621), The Duke of Wellington's Regiment (West Riding).
- Major Christopher Michael Edward Pugh (484007), Royal Tank Regiment, Royal Armoured Corps.
- 24750204 Sapper Stephen Graeme Rafferty, Corps of Royal Engineers.
- Major Richard Mark James Rollo-Walker (49S378), The Light Infantry.
- Major Robert James Vincent Ross (493780), The Royal Welch Fusiliers.
- 24724323 Private Philip Rouke, Ulster Defence Regiment.
- 24408753 Warrant Officer Class 2 David Scullion, Royal Army Ordnance Corps.
- Captain Ian Alexander Robert Stenning (511909), Corps of Royal Military Police.
- 24451517 Staff Sergeant Steven Andrew Strong, Royal Army Ordnance Corps.
- 24358467 Corporal Keith Thompson, Corps of Royal Engineers.
- 24176446 Warrant Officer Class 1 (now Lieutenant (532243)) Anthony David Thorogood, Royal Army Ordnance Corps.
- Major Peter Errington Townsend, M.B.E. (481883), Corps of Royal Military Police.
- 24345435 Sergeant Thomas Barry Traynor, Ulster Defence Regiment.
- Major Mark Stirling Ranulph Vincent (496864), The Light Infantry.
- 24565820 Lance Corporal David Walker, Royal Tank Regiment, Royal Armoured Corps.
- Captain (acting Major) Henry Owen Walters (510437), The Royal Welch Fusiliers.
- 24539396 Private Darrell Raymond Walton, The Duke of Wellington's Regiment (West Riding).
- 24267716 Warrant Officer Class 2 Michael Ward, Royal Corps of Transport.
- Lieutenant Colonel Colin Worsley Watkins (477430), Corps of Royal Military Police.
- Lieutenant Colonel Roy Maddox Wilde, (485861), The Royal Regiment of Fusiliers.
- Major Christopher Stanley Wilson, B.E.M. (511774), Army Air Corps.
- Major Robert John Wiseman (496773), The Royal Welch Fusiliers.

== See also ==
- 2021 Special Honours
- 2020 Special Honours
- 2019 Special Honours
- 2018 Special Honours
- 2017 Special Honours
- 1993 Special Honours
- 1991 Special Honours
- 1982 Special Honours
- 1974 Special Honours
- 1973 Special Honours
