= Michael Pratt (GC) =

Australian police officer (1954–2025)

Michael Pratt GC
- Born: 13 November 1954; East Melbourne, Victoria, Australia
- Died: 11 October 2025 (aged 70)
- Police career
- Service: Victoria Police Force
- Service years: 1974–1979
- Rank: Senior Constable
- Awards: George Cross

Michael Kenneth Pratt GC (13 November 1954 – 11 October 2025) was an Australian police officer who was a constable of the Victoria Police Force in the Melbourne area. He received the George Cross for outstanding bravery in his efforts to thwart the armed robbery of a bank in 1976, the last Australian to be awarded the decoration before Australia withdrew from the Imperial honours system.

== Early life and education ==
Pratt was born on 13 November 1954 in East Melbourne, Victoria. He was one of six children of Kenneth and Velda Pratt (née Warry). He went to school at the Christian Brothers College (Junior School) at Alphington and Bundoora, followed by Preston Technical School, where he studied accounting and captained the Football Club in 1972.

== Early career ==
After Pratt completed his training with the Victoria Police in 1974, he served with the Melbourne division until he transferred to Heidelberg, Victoria in 1975.

== Intervention ==
On the morning of 4 June 1976, Constable Pratt intervened in a robbery of an ANZ Bank branch in Clifton Hill, Victoria. When he was driving his car while he was off-duty, Pratt saw three men covering their faces with masks and pulling out handguns from under their jackets outside of an ANZ Bank branch. Shortly after the robbers entered the bank, Pratt turned on his hazard lights, drove his car across the opposite lane of traffic and jammed it into the bank's door. When two of the criminals exited the bank after breaking the glass panel of the jammed door, Pratt, who was unarmed, fought with one of the thieves and eventually held him in an armlock while he was face-down on the ground. Although Pratt tried to position the subdued criminal so that he could be used as a shield, the other robber shot Pratt in the back, with the bullet entering the lower part of his right lung and damaging his spine. After emergency surgery, Pratt identified two of the thieves via photographs. The three robbers were eventually caught. Keith George Faure was convicted of shooting Pratt and also of two counts of manslaughter for unrelated crimes; he was sentenced to 17 years in prison. The other criminals were also imprisoned for their role in the robbery. The injuries Pratt received resulted in his retirement in 1979 from the Victoria Police Force.

== Citation ==
In 1978, Pratt was awarded the George Cross. The official announcement was published in the London Gazette on 3 July described how Pratt "displayed outstanding bravery, devotion to duty and a complete disregard for his own safety when, unarmed and single handed, he faced and attempted to arrest these dangerous armed criminals."

== Personal life and death ==
Pratt married his wife Dianne, a teacher of autistic children, in 1976. He died in palliative care in Melbourne, on 11 October 2025 at the age of 70. He was survived by his wife, their son and their three daughters.
