= Teruo Asada =

Japanese businessperson

- Born: 1948 (age 77–78)
- Occupations: Chairman, Marubeni

Teruo Asada (born October 13, 1948) is a Japanese businessman, the chairman of Marubeni since April 2013.

Asada joined Marubeni's finance department in 1972 and was its president and CEO from April 2008 to April 2013. Over the course of his tenure, he has held positions and executive titles in finance, business and investment functions at Marubeni, as well as posts in the company's Los Angeles and London operations early in his career.

Asada graduated from Keio University in 1972.

In June 2021, he was appointed as Honorary Commander of the Order of the British Empire (CBE), for services to UK Trade and Investment.
