= 1987 Special Honours =

British government recognitions

As part of the British honours system, Special Honours are issued at the Monarch's pleasure at any given time. The Special Honours refer to the awards made within royal prerogative, operational honours and other honours awarded outside the New Years Honours and Birthday Honours

== Life peer ==
=== Baronesses ===
- Dr. Tessa Ann Vosper Blackstone, Visiting Fellow, Policy Studies Institute. Master-elect of Birkbeck College.
- Emily May, Mrs. Blatch, Conservative Leader, Cambridgeshire County Council. Former Leader of the council.

=== Barons ===
- David Basnett, former General Secretary, General and Municipal Boilermakers' and Allied Trades Union.
- Denis Victor Carter, Director of firm of Agricultural Consultants and farmer.
- Sir James Duncan Goold, D.L., Chairman, Scottish Conservative Party. Former Chairman, Confederation of British Industry, Scotland.
- Alexander Andrew Mackay Irvine, Q.C., Queen's Counsel.
- Sir Charles Collier Johnston, T.D., Joint Honorary Treasurer, Conservative Party. Former Chairman, Executive Committee of the National Union of Conservative and Unionist Association.
- Professor Maurice Harry Peston, Professor of Economics, Queen Mary College, London University.
- Sir Charles Henry Plumb, D.L., President of the European Parliament. Former President, National Farmers' Union.
- David Robert Stevens, Chairman, United Newspapers plc.
- Sir Joseph Anthony Porteous Trafford, Consultant Physician, Brighton Health Authority. Chairman of Council and Senior Pro-Chancellor, University of Sussex. Former Conservative Member of Parliament.
