= 1973 Special Honours =

British government recognitions

As part of the British honours system, Special Honours are issued at the Monarch's pleasure at any given time. The Special Honours refer to the awards made within royal prerogative, operational honours and other honours awarded outside the New Years Honours and Birthday Honours.

== Most Excellent Order of the British Empire ==
Ribbon bar of the Order of the British Empire (Military)

Ribbon bar of the Order of the British Empire Civil)

=== Commander of the Order of the British Empire (CBE) ===
Military Division

Army

- Colonel Desmond Alfred Barker-Wyatt, M.B.E. (290897) (late Royal Engineers).

=== Officer of the Order of the British Empire (OBE) ===
Military Division

Army

- Lieutenant-Colonel Ian Richard Cartwright (430258), The Royal Regiment of Fusiliers.
- Lieutenant Colonel Robert Henville Chappell (418224), The Queen's Regiment.
- Lieutenant Colonel Paul Laurence Crosby (387427), Royal Army Ordnance Corps.
- Lieutenant-Colonel David William Hanson, M.B.E. (420851), The Prince of Wales's Own Regiment of Yorkshire.
- Lieutenant Colonel David Edwin Miller, M.C. (418335), The King's Own Royal Border Regiment.
- Lieutenant-Colonel John Terence Southgate (414983), Royal Regiment of Artillery.

=== Member of the Order of the British Empire (MBE) ===
Military Division

Army

- Major Charles Michael John Barnes (448908), The Royal Anglian Regiment.
- Major David Arthur Betley (451187), The Royal Regiment of Fusiliers.
- Major George Humphrey Bradshaw (432484), The Royal Anglian Regiment.
- W/340054 Warrant Officer Class 2 Doris Audrey Brook, Women's Royal Army Corps.
- Major Gavin Bulloch (454819), The Queen's Regiment.
- Captain (acting Major) Anthony Arthur Denison-Smith (471244), Grenadier Guards.
- Major William Robert Dickson (489435), Ulster Defence Regiment.
- Captain Christopher Henry Acton Hawker (481788), The Royal Green Jackets.
- Major (E.M.A.E.) John Frederick Hill (463674), Corps of Royal Electrical and Mechanical Engineers.
- Captain Roger Howe (473975), The Royal Anglian Regiment
- Major Howard Alfred John Jordan (478114), Royal Corps of Transport.
- Captain (Quartermaster) Gordon Long (478334), The Green Howards (Alexandra, Princess of Wales's Own Yorkshire Regiment).
- Captain (Quartermaster) Frederick George Marsh (477057), The King's Own Royal Border Regiment.
- Major Timothy Nolan (455070), Royal Regiment of Artillery.
- Reverend Curwen Rawlinson (473425), Chaplain to the Forces Class 3, Royal Army Chaplains' Department.
- Major Gerald Alexander Crozier Saunt (457270), The Light Infantry.
- Major Peter Treneer-Michell (457293), The Royal Green Jackets.
- Captain Geoffrey Charles Van-Orden (475684), Intelligence Corps.
- 23351910 Warrant Officer Class 2 (acting Warrant Officer Class 1) David Ralph Williams, Corps of Royal Military Police
- Captain (Quartermaster) Francis Alan Williams (484460), The Royal Green Jackets.
- 23833021 Warrant Officer Class 2 Alan Heatherill Willson, Intelligence Corps.
- Major John Anthony Wright (467650), 16th/5th The Queen's Royal Lancers.

== George Medal (GM) ==
- 23881153 Sergeant Kevin Callaghan, Royal Army Ordnance Corps.
- 22995602 Warrant Officer Class 1 Frederick Herbert Eldred, Royal Army Ordnance Corps.
- Captain John Nelson Gunson (482746), Royal Army Ordnance Corps.
- 22367973 Warrant Officer Class 1 Peter Edwin Spencer Gurney, Royal Army Ordnance Corps.

== British Empire Medal for Gallantry (BEM) ==
- 23919662 Sergeant Alan Anfield, Royal Army Ordnance Corps.
- 23714370 Warrant Officer Class 2 John Stanley Clark, Corps of Royal Engineers.
- 23668269 Sergeant Anthony Riley Leak, The Light Infantry.
- 23678891 Staff-Sergeant Michael Daniel Maloney, The Queen's Regiment.

== British Empire Medal (BEM) ==
- 23497049 Corporal (acting Sergeant) James Lee Bryce, The Parachute Regiment.
- 23547930 Corporal Brian Griddle, Royal Army Veterinary Corps.
- 23889722 Corporal (acting Sergeant) Brian Keith Dent, The Prince of Wales's Own Regiment of Yorkshire.
- 24211821 Lance Corporal John Edwards, Intelligence Corps.
- 23996856 Sergeant David Thomas Gibb, Army Air Corps.
- 23895674 Sergeant John Gordon McCrindle, Royal Corps of Signals.
- 23984656 Sergeant Christopher Norman Mears, The Royal Regiment of Fusiliers.
- W/424066 Corporal Jane Brown Purdie, Women's Royal Army Corps
- 24125069 Corporal Peter Phillip Walters, Corps of Royal Military Police.

== Military Cross (MC) ==
- Major Stuart Trevor Willcocks Anderson (453432), The Queen's Regiment.
- Lieutenant David Michael Beaumont Ash (484814), The Light Infantry.
- Lieutenant Francis Richard Dannatt (491436), The Green Howards (Alexandra, Princess of Wales's Own Yorkshire Regiment).
- Lieutenant Christopher Arnold Downward (486636), The Light Infantry.
- Lieutenant Stephen John Anthony Flanagan (490503), The King's Own Royal Border Regiment.
- Major Roger Hugh Ker (469035), The Royal Green Jackets.

== Distinguished Conduct Medal (DCM) ==
- 23738257 Lance Corporal (acting Corporal) Michael Rattigan, The Royal Green Jackets.
- 23945040 Sergeant Nigel Whitfield, The Royal Anglian Regiment.

== Military Medal (MM) ==
- 23677224 Staff Sergeant Leslie McLean Boyes, The King's Own Scottish Borderers.
- 23721959 Sergeant George Henry Clarke, The Green Howards (Alexandra, Princess of Wales's Own Yorkshire Regiment).
- 24122688 Lance Corporal Kenneth Michael Cross, The Queen's Lancashire Regiment.
- 24076618 Guardsman James Falconer, Coldstream Guards. 23928843
- 24001066 Corporal John Hamilton, Corps of Royal Engineers.
- Corporal Julian Laker, The Royal Regiment of Fusiliers.
- 24040476 Corporal William James Monks, The Queen's Lancashire Regiment.
- 23915386 Sergeant Patrick Paul Mellon Ryan, The Queen's Regiment.
- 24035692 Corporal Herbert Shingleston, The King's Own Scottish Borderers.
- 23965687 Corporal (acting Sergeant) Rupert George Smith, The Light Infantry.
- 24174907 Lance Corporal William Stuart, 15th/19th The King's Royal Hussars.
- W/439979 Lance Corporal Sarah Jane Warke, Women's Royal Army Corps.
- 23778545 Corporal (acting Sergeant) Eric White, The Royal Regiment of Fusiliers.
- 823965677 Corporal Robert George Wootten, The Royal Regiment of Fusiliers.

== Mentioned in Despatches ==
Palm of the Mentioned in Despatches

- Major Robert Henry Aylmore (461366), Corps of Royal Engineers
- Lieutenant Karl Phillip Allardyce Barclay (488384), The Argyll and Sutherland Highlanders (Princess Louise's)
- Major John Alexander Barr (458231), Royal Army Medical Corps.
- 24124744 Corporal Leslie Norman Barras, Corps of Royal Military Police.
- Lieutenant-Colonel Kenneth Winston Battson, M.B.E, (352320), Ulster Defence Regiment.
- 23916403 Sergeant Ronnie Bradley, The Prince of Wales's Own Regiment of Yorkshire.
- Major Denis Thomas Myles Brunnan (472196), Royal Army Medical Corps.
- Major Robert Daubeny Buchanan-Dunlop (463067), Scots Guards.
- 24205278 Staff Sergeant Samuel John Caldwell, Ulster Defence Regiment.
- Lieutenant (Acting Captain) The Lord Richard Valentine Cecil (482576), Grenadier Guards.
- 23914661 Corporal Michael Anthony Christy, Corps of Royal Engineers.
- 23972318 Lance Corporal (Acting Corporal) George Albert Coney, The Royal Green Jackets.
- Captain (Acting Major) Paul Howard Cordle (468971), Grenadier Guards.
- Lieutenant Gwynfryn Iain Davies (489180), The Royal Welch Fusiliers.
- Major Christopher.Rowlands Day (459240), The Prince of Wales's Own Regiment of Yorkshire.
- Major Antony James Barker Egremont-Lee (451587), The Light Infantry.
- 24127325 Lance Corporal Alan James Fairbairn, Royal Corps of Signals.
- Lieutenant Malcolm James Findlay (481651), The Royal Welch Fusiliers.
- 24076201 Lance Corporal Geoffrey Fishwick, Grenadier Guards.
- 23675292 Warrant Officer Class II William John Gaskin, Royal Army Ordnance Corps.
- 24205110 Lance Corporal Thomas Wilson George, Ulster Defence Regiment.
- 23784715 Sergeant Alan Richard Gibson, Royal Army Ordnance Corps.
- Major Harold Roy Goble (443451), The Prince of Wales's Own Regiment of Yorkshire.
- Captain John Jeffrey Gordon (488272), Royal Army Ordnance Corps.
- 24093297 Lance Corporal (acting Corporal) David Ronald Grimes, The Royal Green Jackets.
- 23968665 Lance Corporal Joseph Haldane, Royal Corps of Signals.
- Lieutenant-Colonel Leon Maxwell Halfpenny (411961), Royal Regiment of Artillery.
- 23979887 Lance Corporal (Acting Corporal) Michael Thomas Hall, The Light Infantry.
- Lieutenant Charles Michael Fawcett Hampton (488796), 16th/5th The Queen's Royal Lancers.
- Lieutenant David Alexander Cameron Hannah (484996), The Royal Hampshire Regiment.
- 24199498 Corporal William Thomas Hawthorne, Ulster Defence Regiment.
- Captain Guy de Vere Wingfield Hayes (480328), The Royal Green Jackets.
- Major Peter Vernon Hervey (467572), 15th/19th The King's Royal Hussars.
- 24191449 Fusilier Christopher Hobbs, The Royal Welch Fusiliers.
- Captain (Acting Major) Murray Bernard Neville Howard (473974), Coldstream Guards.
- 23735817 Staff Sergeant Edward Glyn Hughes, The Royal Welch Fusiliers.
- Captain Robin Anthony Hulf (480338), The King's Own Scottish Borderers.
- Major John Gilmour Humphreys-Evans (459276), The Royal Welch Fusiliers.
- 24118553 Trooper Alan Jones, 15th/19th The King's Royal Hussars.
- 23951731 Sergeant Richard Michael Judd, The Queen's Lancashire Regiment.
- Captain John Wilson Kewley (481947), The King's Regiment.
- 23920298 Sergeant Rodney James Knight, Royal Army Veterinary Corps.
- 24104022 Corporal Brian Edward Lawrence, The Royal Green Jackets.
- Lieutenant (Acting Captain) Nicholas Charles Lego (490356), The Royal Green Jackets.
- Lieutenant Nicholas Patrick Chad Lewis (484897), The Light Infantry.
- Major Colin Lindsay (440077), The King's Own Scottish Borderers.
- Lieutenant Thomas Longland (485774), The Royal Anglian Regiment
- Lieutenant-Colonel Brian Jeremy Lowe, M.B.E. (433179), The Light Infantry.
- Colonel Egon Bjarne Madsen (383186), late Intelligence Corps.
- 23472937 Warrant Officer Class II Patrick Maher, The Royal Green Jackets.
- Major Paul Mallalieu (449154), The Queen's Regiment.
- Major Simon Hugh Cadman Marriott (467599), The Royal Green Jackets.
- Major James Michael Fredrick Martin (430381), The Worcestershire and Sherwood Foresters Regiment (28th/45th Foot).
- Captain James Heggie Merrick (444749), Regular Army of Officers (late General List).
- 24280651 Private Thomas George Metcalfe, Ulster Defence Regiment.
- Major Andre Roger Raymond Millorit (464021), Royal Army Ordnance Corps.
- 23855284 Sergeant Michael Morrison, Royal Army Ordnance Corps.
- 23220474 Staff Sergeant Frederick Victor Christopher Moth, Corps of Royal Engineers.
- B4283658 Acting Corporal Ian Alexander Collie Mowat, Royal Air Force.
- 23887353 Sergeant James Mulvaney, The Royal Green Jackets.
- Brigadier Denis Leonard Ormerod, M.B.E. (350712), late Infantry.
- 23534843 Staff Sergeant Robert John Palmer, Corps of Royal Engineers.
- 24049380 Corporal Derek Parker, The Queen's Lancashire Regiment.
- 23458890 Staff Sergeant James Henry William Pearson, The Queen's Regiment.
- 22784540 Warrant Officer Class II Barry Phillips, Royal Corps of Transport.
- Major Michael John Reynolds (446885), The King's Own Scottish Borderers.
- 24015147 Sergeant Alexander Robert Robertson-Ferguson, Royal Regiment of Artillery.
- 23664568 Staff Sergeant Gerald Robinson, The Royal Regiment of Fusiliers.
- Major Terence Nigel Robinson (440441, Royal Army Ordnance Corps.
- Major Michael Henry Sharpe (445972), The Prince of Wales's Own Regiment of Yorkshire.
- 2nd Lieutenant Michael Guy Andre Shipley (492713), The Royal Anglian Regiment.
- Captain The Honourable Philip Reginald Smith (476888), The Royal Green Jackets.
- 24167736 Gunner Ian David Stansfield, Royal Regiment of Artillery.
- 23743426 Sergeant James Struthers, The Argyll and Sutherland Highlanders (Princess Louise's).
- 24172892 Driver James Taylor, Royal Corps of Transport.
- 24129865 Private James Taylor, The Argyll and Sutherland Highlanders (Princess Louise's).
- 22515870 Warrant Officer Class 1 James Frederick Thornton, Royal Corps of Signals.
- 22337817 Warrant Officer Class I Raymond Vere Tilbury, Corps of Royal Military Police.
- 22900151 Staff Sergeant Donald James Varney, Royal Army Ordnance Corps.
- 23999684 Corporal Ronald Andrew Weatheritt, The Royal Regiment of Fusiliers.
- 22204919 -Staff Sergeant Thomas Joseph Wiggins, Royal Army Ordnance Corps.
- Major Patrick Erlin Wood (459340), The Parachute Regiment.
- 23657528 Lance Corporal (acting Corporal) George Burton Woodhouse, The Light Infantry.
- Reverend John Brian Wright, Chaplain to the Forces Third Class, Royal Army Chaplain's Department.

== Queen's Commendation for Brave Conduct ==
- Lieutenant Commander Gordon Douglas Hotchkiss, M.B.E., Royal Navy.
- Lieutenant Gordan James Lowrey, Royal Navy.

== See also ==
- 2021 Special Honours
- 2020 Special Honours
- 2019 Special Honours
- 2018 Special Honours
- 2017 Special Honours
- 1993 Special Honours
- 1991 Special Honours
- 1974 Special Honours
