= 1974 Special Honours =

British government recognitions

As part of the British honours system, Special Honours are issued at the Monarch's pleasure at any given time. The Special Honours refer to the awards made within royal prerogative, operational honours and other honours awarded outside the New Years Honours and Birthday Honours.

== Life peer ==
=== Baroness ===
- Inga-Stina, Mrs. Robson, President, Women's Liberal Federation 1968-69 ; 1969-70: President, Liberal Party Organisation 1970-71 ; Chairman, Liberal Party Environment Panel since 1971. Chairman, Board of Governors, Queen Charlotte's and Chelsea Hospitals. Chairman, South West Thames Regional Health Authority.

=== Barons ===
- George Yull Mackie, C.B.E., D.S.O., D.F.C., Member of Parliament for Caithness and Sutherland, 1964–66. Vice-Chairman, Scottish Liberal Party, 1960–65 ; Chairman, 1965–70. Member, National and Local Committees for Scotland, National Farmers' Union. Member of the Scottish Advisory Committee of the British Council.
- Basil Thomas Wigoder, Q.C., Chairman, Liberal Party Executive, 1963–65 ; Liberal Party Organising Committee 1965–66. Vice-President, Liberal Party, 1966.

== Most Excellent Order of the British Empire ==
Ribbon bar of the Order of the British Empire (Military)

Ribbon bar of the Order of the British Empire Civil)

=== Commander of the Order of the British Empire (CBE) ===
Military Division

Army

- Brigadier Joseph David Frederick Mostyn, M.B.E. (397994), (late Infantry).

=== Officer of the Order of the British Empire (OBE) ===
Military Division

Army

- Lieutenant-Colonel Michael Vincent Hayward, M.B.E. (415786), The Queen's Regiment.
- Lieutenant-Colonel Warren Herbert Sillitoe (400065), The Royal Regiment of Fusiliers.
- Lieutenant-Colonel John Charles Wakerley (458786), Army Legal Department
- Lieutenant-Colonel Guy Hansard Watkins (430472), Royal Regiment of Artillery.

=== Member of the Order of the British Empire (MBE) ===
Military Division

Army

- Major Michael John Campbell-Lamerton (425196), The Duke of Wellington's Regiment (West Riding).
- 22792358 Warrant Officer Class 1 Dennis Connell, Royal Corps of Signals.
- Major Brian Goring (443455), The Queen's Regiment.
- Captain Michael John Menage (470114), The Royal Anglian Regiment.
- Captain Kevin Francis Robbin (476091), The Prince of Wales's Own Regiment of Yorkshire.
- Captain Richard Hugh Whittington (489936), Corps of Royal Engineers.
- 23749087 Warrant Officer Class 2 John Alexander Wraith, Royal Corps of Signals.
- Major Antony Peter Wright (459339), The Worcestershire and Sherwood Foresters Regiment (29th/45th Foot)

== George Medal (GM) ==
- 3856214 Staff Sergeant Allan George Griffin, Royal Army Ordnance Corps.
- Major John Albert Jackson, M.B.E. (455036), Royal Army Ordnance Corps.
- 23503123 Warrant Officer Class 2 David Oldham, Royal Army Ordnance Corps.

== British Empire Medal for Gallantry (BEM) ==
- 24026532 Sergeant Frank Haley, Royal Army Ordnance Corps.
- 4011617 Bombardier Peter Lyons, Royal Regiment of Artillery.
- 23876271 Staff Sergeant Ian James Frazer Munro, Royal Army Ordnance Corps.
- 23882230 Corporal (Acting Sergeant)Robert William Nicholls, The Royal Anglian Regiment.
- 23971052 Corporal Michael Henry Smith, Royal Pioneer Corps.
- 23950646 Lance Corporal (Acting Corporal) Paul Keith Sumner, The Royal Green Jackets.
- 24236713 Trooper Derek Graham Woolley, Royal Tank Regiment.

== British Empire Medal (BEM) ==
- 23891379 Staff Sergeant Charles Seth Apcar, Intelligence Corps.
- 23483170 Staff Sergeant Matthew Lever Hall, The Duke of Wellington's Regiment (West Riding).

== Military Medal (MM) ==
- 24205012 Private Mervyn John Johnston, The Ulster Defence Regiment.
- 24068579 Lance Corporal (Acting Corporal) Richard John Tyson, The Royal Green Jackets.

== Mentioned in Despatches ==
Palm of the Mentioned in Despatches

=== Navy ===
- Lieutenant Commander Roger Ernest Arnold-Shrubb.

=== Army ===
- Lieutenant Nigel Stephen Alderman (491400), The Royal Hampshire Regiment.
- Major William Anthony Allen (451181), Royal Tank Regiment.
- 23733711 Staff Sergeant Leslie Lawrence Winston Bowen, Royal Army Ordnance Corps.
- 24070412 Lance Corporal Raymond George Brooks, Royal Army Ordnance Corps.
- Lieutenant Colonel Peter Henry Brumham (420790), Royal Regiment of Artillery.
- 23673607 Sergeant Neville Roger Cox, Royal Corps of Signals.
- 23515756 Staff Sergeant Dicker, The Royal Hampshire Regiment.
- 24031643 Staff Sergeant Stuart Roy Dicker, Intelligence Corps.
- 23870011 Sergeant Brian John Michael Draper, 14th/ 20th Kings Hussars.
- Lieutenant Colonel John Robin Garnet Nial Evelegh (439734), The Royal Green Jackets.
- Lieutenant Maurice Walter Ewence (491147), Royal Regiment of Artillery.
- 23928952 Corporal (Acting Sergeant) William Foxton, The Royal Green Jackets.
- 22807132 Warrant Officer Class 1 Geoffrey Garrick, Royal Army Ordnance Corps.
- 23893862 Sergeant (Acting Staff Sergeant) Charles Frederick Heyman, The Royal Green Jackets.
- Major Kenneth Hurrell Hedges (472088), Royal Army Medical Corps.
- 24139886 Lance Corporal (Acting Corporal) Stanley Louis Holman, The Royal Green Jackets.
- 24141783 Lance Corporal (Acting Corporal) Jeffrey Robert Knight, Grenadier Guards.
- 24123917 Bombardier Graham Lewis, Royal Regiment of Artillery.
- Lieutenant Colonel Leslie John Philip Morrish (437126), The Royal Hampshire Regiment.
- Lieutenant Colonel Robert Alan Pascoe, M.B.E. (424428), The Royal Green Jackets.
- 22053015 Warrant Officer Class 1 Reginald Phillips, Royal Army Ordnance Corps.
- 22801083 Warrant Officer Class 1 George James Pinchin, The Duke of Edinburgh's Royal Regiment (Berkshire and Wiltshire).
- Major Thomas Michael Plewman (444859), Corps of Royal Military Police.
- Major Malcolm James Spencer Reed (449041), Royal Regiment of Artillery.
- 24221855 Lance Corporal David John Rimmer, The Royal Green Jackets,
- Captain (acting Major) Richard John Rimmer (479330), The Royal Green Jackets.
- Captain Anthony John Shipley (482834), Royal Corps of Transport.
- Major Henry Martin Lockhart Smith (455097), Grenadier Guards.
- 24161648 Private Philip Alan Smith, The Queen's Regiment.
- Major John Gerald Thomas Southwood (453557), The Royal Hampshire Regiment.
- Captain William Boyd Squires (487857), Royal Army Ordnance Corps.
- 24281183 Lance Corporal Ronald William St. John, The Royal Hampshire Regiment.
- W//441777 Private Kathleen Taylor, Women's Royal Army Corps.
- Captain (Acting Major) Alan Elliott Thompson, M.B.E., M.C. (471365), The Royal Anglian Regiment.
- Major Peter Loftus Troughton (459134), Royal Regiment of Artillery.
- 22776550 Staff Sergeant Robin John Wherry, Royal Corps of Signals.
- Captain John Albert Wilkins (493390), Royal Corps of Signals.
- 23751021 Staff Sergeant Paul Wilkinson, Duke of Wellington's Regiment (West Riding).
- Captain Robert George Woodfield (490320), Grenadier Guards.

=== Air Force ===
- Acting Warrant Officer William Elvin (K4020755).
- X4270624 Corporal Alfred Francis Wood, Royal Air Force Regiment.

== See also ==
- 2021 Special Honours
- 2020 Special Honours
- 2019 Special Honours
- 2018 Special Honours
- 2017 Special Honours
- 1993 Special Honours
- 1991 Special Honours
