= 2021 Special Honours =

British government recognitions

As part of the British honours system, Special Honours are issued at the Monarch's pleasure at any given time. The Special Honours refer to the awards made within royal prerogative, operational honours, political honours and other honours awarded outside the New Year Honours and Birthday Honours.

== Life Peerage ==
=== Conservative Party ===
- Malcolm Ian Offord, to be Baron Offord of Garvel, of Greenhook in the County of Renfrewshire – 13 October 2021

=== Crossbench ===
- Professor Dame Sue Black, DBE FBA FRSE, to be Baroness Black of Strome, of Strome in the County of Ross-shire – 26 April 2021
- Sir Amyas Charles Edward Morse, KCB, to be Baron Morse, of Aldeburgh in the County of Suffolk – 26 March 2021
- Sir Simon Stevens, to be Baron Stevens of Birmingham, of Richmond upon Thames in the London Borough of Richmond upon Thames – 5 July 2021

== Lord Lieutenant ==
- Roderick Macduff Urquhart – to be Lord-Lieutenant of East Lothian – 1 February 2021
- Gawn William Rowan Hamilton – to be Lord-Lieutenant for County Down – 12 May 2021
- Lady Redmond, MBE – to be Lord-Lieutenant of the County of Cheshire – 17 May 2021
- Andrew Blackman – to be Lord-Lieutenant of East Sussex – 17 May 2021
- James Robert Edwards Wotherspoon – to be Lord-Lieutenant for Inverness – 27 May 2021
- Marjorie Glasgow, BEM – to be Lord-Lieutenant of Oxfordshire – 7 June 2021
- Matthew Murray Kennedy St Clair, The Lord Sinclair – to be Lord-Lieutenant of Kirkcudbright – 29 July 2021
- Professor Dame Hilary Chapman, DBE – to be Lord-Lieutenant of South Yorkshire – 18 August 2021

== Privy Counsellor ==
- Stuart Andrew, MP – 12 February 2021
- Nigel Evans, MP – 12 February 2021
- Mark Pritchard, MP – 12 February 2021
- Col Robert Stewart, DSO, MP – 12 February 2021
- Stewart Hosie, MP – 12 February 2021
- Dame Diana Johnson, DBE, MP – 12 February 2021
- Angela Rayner, MP – 12 February 2021
- Nicklaus Thomas-Symonds, MP – 12 February 2021
- Jonathan Ashworth, MP – 12 February 2021
- The Rt Hon. The Lord Udny-Lister – 12 February 2021
- Lucy Frazer, QC, MP – 2 March 2021
- The Hon. Sir Andrew Edis – 10 March 2021
- The Rt Hon. The Lord Frost, CMG – 10 March 2021
- The Hon. Sir Paul Maguire – 10 March 2021
- The Hon. Sir Mark Warby – 10 March 2021
- The Rt Hon. The Lord Parker of Minsmere, GCVO, KCB – 28 April 2021
- The Hon. Sir Colin Birss – 28 April 2021
- The Most Hon. Andrew Holness, ON, MP – 26 May 2021
- Nadine Dorries, MP – 20 September 2021
- Nadhim Zahawi, MP – 20 September 2021
- Michelle Donelan, MP – 20 September 2021
- Simon Clarke, MP – 20 September 2021
- Kit Malthouse, MP – 20 September 2021
- Nigel Adams, MP – 20 September 2021
- The Hon. Dame Siobhan Keegan, DBE – 20 September 2021
- Dorothy Bain, QC – 10 November 2021
- The Hon. Sir William Davis – 15 December 2021
- The Hon. Sir Richard Snowden – 15 December 2021
- The Hon. Dame Philippa Whipple, DBE – 15 December 2021

== George Cross (GC) ==
George Cross ribbon

- National Health Service – 5 July 2021 – For "This award recognises all NHS staff, past and present, across all disciplines and all four nations. Over more than seven decades, and especially in recent times, you have supported the people of our country with courage, compassion and dedication, demonstrating the highest standards of public service."

== Most Distinguished Order of St Michael and St George ==
Order of St Michael and St George ribbon

=== Knight Grand Cross of the Order of St Michael and St George (GCMG) ===
Honorary

- His Majesty Sultan Haitham bin Tariq, GCVO – 16 December 2021 Sultan of Oman

=== Knight Commander of the Order of St Michael and St George (KCMG) ===
- Baron Peter Karel Piot, KCMG – 4 October 2021 – Honorary appointed in 2016 to be made Substantive

=== Companion of the Order of St Michael and St George (CMG) ===
- Dr. Stefan Nicolaas Dercon, CMG – 4 October 2021 – Honorary appointed in 2018 to be made Substantive

Honorary

- Dr. Garret Adare Fitzgerald – Professor of Systems Pharmacology and Translational Therapeutics, University of Pennsylvania. For services to the advancement of UK medical science.
- Patti Whaley – Lately Chair, ActionAid. For services to international development.

== Royal Victorian Chain ==
Ribbon of the Royal Victorian Chain

- The Rt Hon. The Earl Peel, GCVO, PC, DL – Former Lord Chamberlain of the Royal Household – 13 April 2021

== Royal Victorian Order ==
Royal Victorian Order ribbon

=== Knight Grand Cross of the Royal Victorian Order (GCVO) ===
- The Rt Hon. The Lord Parker of Minsmere, KCB – upon appointment as Lord Chamberlain of the Royal Household – 14 April 2021.

=== Member of the Royal Victorian Order (MVO) ===
- Major Sanjip Rai, The Royal Gurkha Rifles – on relinquishment of his appointment as Queen’s Gurkha Orderly Officer – 30 November 2021.
- Major Deepak Rai, The Queen’s Gurkha Signals – on relinquishment of his appointment as Queen’s Gurkha Orderly Officer – 30 November 2021.
- Captain Deny Gurung, The Queens’ Own Gurkha Logistic Regiment – on relinquishment of his appointment as Queen’s Gurkha Orderly Officer – 30 November 2021.
- Captain Ganeshkumar Gurung, The Royal Gurkha Rifles – on relinquishment of his appointment as Queen’s Gurkha Orderly Officer – 30 November 2021.

== Most Excellent Order of the British Empire ==
Ribbon bar of the Order of the British Empire (Civil)

Ribbon bar of the Order of the British Empire (Military)

=== Knight / Dame Commander of the Order of the British Empire (KBE / DBE) ===
Civil division

- Professor Uta Frith, DBE, FRS – 4 October 2021 – Honorary appointed in 2012 to be made Substantive

Honorary

- Professor Philip Chase Bobbitt – For services to UK/US relations and public life.
- Professor Adrian V. S. Hill – Director of the Jenner Institute and Lakshmi Mittal and Family Professor of Vaccinology at Oxford University. For services to Science and Public Health

=== Commander of the Order of the British Empire (CBE) ===
Military division

- Commodore Dean Anthony Bassett, Royal Navy

Civil division
Honorary

- Teruo Asada – Chairman of Marubeni Corporation, Japan. For services to UK Trade and Investment.
- Professor May Cassar – Director, University College London, Institute for Sustainable Heritage. For services to heritage.
- Sue Ann Costa Clemens – Director Vaccine Group Oxford-Brazil and Visiting Professor in Global Health, Department of Paediatrics, Oxford University. For services to Science and Public Health.
- Fiona Dawson – Global President, Mars Food, Drinks and Multisales. For services to women and the UK economy.
- Angela Moore – Owner, Belleek Pottery. For services to economic development and philanthropy in Northern Ireland.
- Henry Obi – Businessman. For services to Public and Political Service.
- Stephen Trautman – Deputy Director, Naval Reactors, US Department of Energy and US Department of Navy. For services to UK/US relations.

=== Officer of the Order of the British Empire (OBE) ===
Military division

- Colonel Douglas Malcolm George Bowley, QHS
- Surgeon Lieutenant Colonel Jeremy Hart Lewin, The Blues and Royals (Royal Horse Guards and 1st Dragoons)
- Wing Commander Morgan Williams, Royal Air Force
- Commander Murray William Adam, Royal Navy
- Captain Fiona Percival, Royal Navy
- Colonel James Douglas Loudoun, Late Parachute Regiment
- Wing Commander Jennie Bernadette Cross, Royal Air Force

Civil division
Honorary

- Ernie Allen – Chair, WePROTECT Global Alliance. For services to the protection of children in the UK.
- Susan Mary Allen – Head of Retail and Business Banking, Santander plc. For services to finance.
- Professor Ruth Arnon – Paul Ehrlich Professor of Immunology at the Weizmann Institute of Science, Israel. For services to UK-Israel Science Collaboration.
- Veronique Aubert-Bell – Conflict and Humanitarian Research and Policy Advisor, Save the Children. For services to children living in conflict.
- Paul Buggy – Employment Judge, Office of the Industrial Tribunals and Fair Employment Tribunal. For services to employment law.
- Professor Gabriel Cooney – Chair of the Historic Monuments Council for Northern Ireland. For services to Heritage.
- Professor Derrick Crook – Professor of Microbiology, Nuffield Department of Medicine, University of Oxford. For services to Microbiology.
- Francisco de la Torre Prados – Mayor of the City of Málaga. For services to bilateral relations between Málaga and the UK.
- Edel Harris – Chief Executive, Cornerstone, Scotland. For services to the public sector and charity.
- Dr. Farid Ahmad Homayoun – Country Director, The HALO Trust. For services to international development.
- Jay Jolley – Assistant Artistic Director, Royal Ballet School. For services to dance.
- Associate Professor Teresa Lambe – COVID Associate Professor at the Jenner Institute. For services to Science and Public Health.
- Anne Langley – Formerly Head of Group Operations, People and Operations Division, Department for International Development. For services to international development.
- Dr. Olivier Le Polain De Waroux – Deputy Director, UK Public Health Rapid Support Team, Public Health England. For services to global health.
- Professor Ronan Lyons – Clinical Professor of Public Health, Wales. For services to research, innovation and public health.
- Carlos Alfonso Nobre – Climate Scientist and Meteorologist. For services to UK/Brazil climate science collaboration.
- Professor Máire O’Neill – Professor of Information Technology, Queen’s University Belfast. For services to computer security.
- Professor Massimo Palmarini – Director Medical Research Council, University of Glasgow Centre for Virus Research. For services to Public Health.
- Geraldine Mary Rodgers – Director of Nursing, Leadership and Quality at NHS England and NHS Improvement. For services to older people.
- Dr. Rosaleen Ann Sharkey – Consultant Respiratory Physician, Altnagelvin Hospital, Londonderry. For services to respiratory medicine during the COVID-19 crisis.
- Professor Jason Swedlow – Professor of Quantitative Cell Biology, University of Dundee. For services to biological imaging.
- Denise Valín Álvarez– Director, Burberry. For services to International Trade.

=== Member of the Order of the British Empire (MBE) ===
Military division

- Acting Lieutenant Colonel (now Major) Romesh Vanendra Chinnadurai, The Royal Logistic Corps
- Major Damien Alexander Mead, The Royal Regiment of Scotland
- Major Dominic Joseph Andrew Dias, Corps of Royal Engineers
- Lieutenant Commander Paul Inglesby, Royal Navy
- Lieutenant Colonel Brian Douglas Duff, Corps of Royal Engineers

Civil division
Honorary

- Nueteki Akuetteh – Senior Policy Advisor, British Embassy, Washington, USA. For services to global health and COVID-19 response.
- Reem Al Atrouni – Head of Corporate Services, British Embassy Beirut, Lebanon. For services to the British Embassy in Beirut.
- Salar Amin – Political Officer, British Consulate General, Erbil, Iraq. For services to the British Consulate General, Erbil.
- Karina Aprile – Consular Assistant, British Embassy, Montevideo, Uruguay. For services to British and Commonwealth nationals.
- Abdessattar Mohamed Badri – British Honorary Consul, Sousse, Tunisia. For services to the Foreign, Commonwealth & Development Office.
- Suha Batarseh – Head of Trade and Investment Jordan, British Embassy, Amman, Jordan. For services to UK/Jordanian Trade and Investment.
- Himangi Bhardwaj – Senior Health and Life Sciences Policy Advisor, British Embassy, New Delhi, India. For services to healthcare services in India and UK.
- Elaine Birchall – Chief Executive Officer, SHS Group. For services to economic development in Northern Ireland.
- Carlos Chau – Deputy Director Infrastructure, British Embassy, Lima, Peru. For services to bilateral trade and British business.
- Martine Clark – Executive Head Teacher, Byron Court Primary School, Wembley. For services to education in the London Borough of Brent.
- Isabelle Clement – Director, Wheels for Wellbeing. For voluntary charitable services.
- Sonsoles Diez de Rivera y de Icaza – Vice President, British Hispanic Foundation. For services to promoting British culture in Spain.
- Marian Doogan – Clinical Sister, South West Acute Hospital. For services to cardiology nursing in Northern Ireland.
- Kayla Beth Ente – Chief Executive Officer, Brighton and Hove Energy Service Co-operative. For services to community-led energy efficiency.
- Jyoti Anne Fernandes – Farmer. For services to food and organic farming.
- David Fernández Jímenez – Business Engagement Manager, Consular Contact Centre, Malaga, Spain. For services to British nationals overseas.
- Gulnar Gabdulova – Deputy Director DIT Kazakhstan and Head of British Trade Office in Atyrau, Kazakhstan. For services to Trade and Investment.
- Kieran Gordon – Lately Chief Executive, Career Connect. For services to Careers Education in North West England.
- Peter Hannan – Proprietor and Managing Director, Hannan Meats. For services to Economic Development in Northern Ireland.
- Jeffrey Hay – Attorney. For services to UK/US Business Relations.
- Rory Hoy – Inspector, Police Service of Northern Ireland. For services to policing.
- Ann Hutchinson-Guest – Author and Researcher on Dance. For services to dance.
- Lolita Jackson – Chair of the British American Project and Special Advisor to Director of Climate Policy, New York City Mayor’s Office. For services to promoting deeper links and partnership between the UK and USA.
- Dr. Kondal Reddy Kandadi – Deputy Vice Chancellor, University of Bolton and Chair, Alliance Learning. For services to Education, Public Health and Industry.
- Diala Khlat – Chairman, Rebuilding Childhoods Board, National Society for the Prevention of Cruelty to Children. For services to Children.
- Tarek Khlat – Volunteer, Rebuilding Childhoods Board and Trustee, National Society for the Prevention of Cruelty to Children. For services to Children.
- Joanna Lau – Marshall Aid Commemoration Commission Regional Chair, Boston, USA. For services to the Marshall Scholarship Programme.
- Maureen McKeever – Principal, Mount Lourdes Grammar School, Enniskillen, Northern Ireland. For services to Education in Northern Ireland.
- Mahmoud Mouselli – Director Programmes & Partnerships, British Council. For services to Education in Northern Ireland.
- Jean-Christophe Louis Phillipe Novelli – Chef and Author. For voluntary and charitable service.
- Melissa Odabash – Fashion Designer. For services to international swimwear fashion.
- Carlos Pulenta – President, Bodegas Vistalba and British Honorary Consul. For services to British Nationals overseas and to Trade and Investment.
- Sabina Maria Joyce Purcell – Organiser of First World War commemorations, Dublin. For services to UK/Ireland relations and First World War commemorations.
- Giulia Parisi St George – Co-Founder, The Italian Job. For services to charity.
- Lucy Santamarina – Vice Consul, British Embassy, Buenos Aires, Argentina. For services to British nationals overseas.
- Dr. Ananda Giri Manchanahalli Shankar – Professional Lead for Health Protection at Public Health Wales. For services to public health in Wales.
- Mohini Singh – Consular Officer, British Deputy High Commission, Chandigarh, India. For services to COVID-19 Crisis Response in India.
- Marie Margaret Stock – Vice Principal, The Manchester College. For services to Education.
- Eamonn James Patrick Sullivan – Chief Nurse, The Royal Marsden NHS Foundation Trust. For services to nursing.
- Salah Taha – Political and Press Officer, British Embassy Riyadh. For services to British Foreign Policy.

== British Empire Medal (BEM) ==
Ribbon bar of the British Empire Medal (Civil)

Honorary

- Sumer Adlakha – British Airways Customer Service Manager for India and the Maldives. For services to vulnerable British nationals in India.
- Jude Baldsing – Protocol Officer, British High Commission, Colombo, Sri Lanka. For services to the delivery of British foreign policy in Sri Lanka.
- Gurcharan Singh Bedi – Volunteer. For services to charitable fundraising and the community in Dudley.
- Uday Vickram Bhosale – Iyengar Yoga Instructor. For fundraising services to NHS charities and supporting the mental health of yoga practitioners during COVID-19.
- Susan Marjorie Linda Black – Volunteer Hockey Coach, Cookstown, Northern Ireland. For services to the community in Cookstown.
- Renee Bornstein – Holocaust survivor. For services to Holocaust education and commemoration.
- Daniel Feldman – Consulate Agent. For services to the British Embassy and British nationals in Argentina during the COVID-19 crisis.
- Dr. Peter Hickey – Consultant Respiratory and General Physician, Chesterfield Royal Hospital. For services to the National Health Service.
- Aby Joseph – Clinical Service Manager, Alveston Leys Care Home. For services to care home residents.
- Dimitrios Mavridis – Media Relations Manager, UK Mission to the European Union. For services to British foreign policy.
- Clare McCarroll – Physiotherapist, Merseycare NHS Foundation Trust. Foundation Trust For services to the National Health Service.
- Eisa Mohammed-Ali – Dietitian. For services to UK/Kuwait relations.
- Simukai Mudzingwa – North West Ventilation Unit House Keeper. For services to the NHS.
- Wendy Yewande Olayiwola – Senior Midwifery Manager and Better Births Project Lead, Barts Health NHS Trust. For services to the National Health Service.
- Donald Emmanuel Payen – Executive Vice President, Air Mauritius. For services to UK/Mauritian relations, including during COVID-19 crisis.
- Venkatraman Perumal – Head Gardener, Madras Commonwealth War Graves Ceremony. For services to Commonwealth War Graves.
- Nandita Rajput – Senior Investment Adviser, British Deputy High Commission Gujarat, India. For services to the British Community in Gujarat during the COVID-19 pandemic.
- Arbo Seppel – Embassy Driver, British Embassy Tallinn, Estonia. For services to the British Embassy in Tallinn.
- Samuel Victoria – Butler, UK Ambassador’s Residence, British Embassy Buenos Aires. For services to the British Embassy in Buenos Aires.

== Queen's Gallantry Medal (QGM) ==
Ribbon bar of the Queen's Gallantry Medal

- Michael Hooper, Leicestershire Police
- Stephen Quartermain, Leicestershire Police
- Daniel Nicholson
- Joel Snarr

== Royal Victorian Medal (RVM) ==
Royal Victorian Medal ribbon

Silver

- Pipe Major Richard Keith Grisdale – on the relinquishment of his appointment as The Queen’s Piper – 29 September 2021

== Mentioned in Despatches ==
Palm of the Mentioned in Despatches

- Lance Corporal Michael Thomas Cameron, Royal Army Medical Corps
- Lance Corporal (now Corporal) John Wardle, Royal Army Medical Corps

== Queen's Commendation for Bravery ==
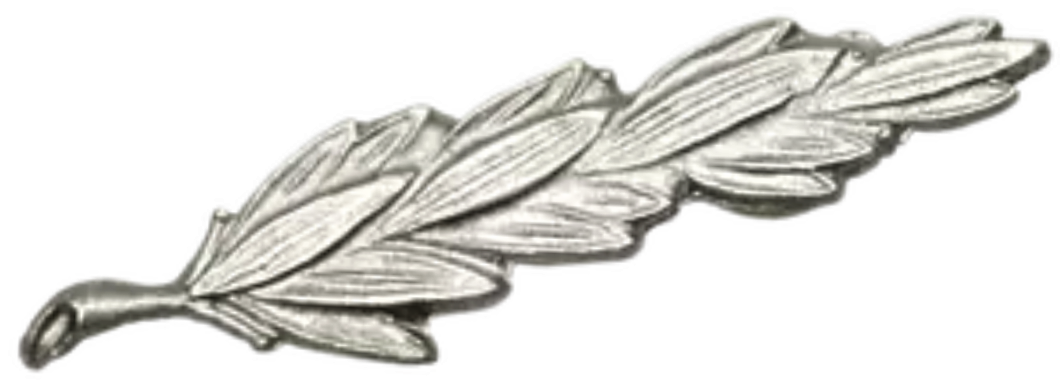
Queen's Commendation for Bravery

- Shaun Randall, Leicestershire Police
- Colin Burgess, Cheshire Fire and Rescue Service
- Nigel Quarmby, Cheshire Fire and Rescue Service
- Stephen Wharton, Cumbria Fire and Rescue Service
- Maurice Wrightson – posthumous
- Robert (Glenn) Carr, National Crime Agency
- Joel Andrews, National Crime Agency
- Lillian Hood – posthumous
- Petty Officer Engineering Technician Jonathon Wayne, Royal Navy
- Colour Sergeant (now Warrant Officer Class 2) Bishwahang Rai, The Royal Gurkha Rifles
- Corporal Dean Jonathan Wilson, The Royal Logistic Corps, Army Reserve

== Queen's Commendation for Valuable Service ==
Palm of the Queen's Commendation for Valuable Service

- Commander Robin Donovan, Royal Navy
- Lieutenant Commander Andrew Nolan, Royal Navy
- Lieutenant Colonel (now Colonel) Sam Edward Armel Cates, The Rifles
- Corporal Modou Faye, Adjutant General’s Corps (Staff and Personnel Support Branch)
- Lance Corporal (now Corporal) Anne Louise Gowdy, Intelligence Corps
- Lieutenant Colonel Robert Paul James Kace, The Royal Dragoon Guards
- Acting Major (now Captain) Oliver James Lewis, Corps of Royal Engineers
- Lieutenant Colonel William John McKeran, MBE, Intelligence Corps
- Warrant Officer Class 2 Paul Stephen Nancollis, The Rifles
- Major Simon James Pierson, Royal Corps of Signals
- Wing Commander Edward Stephen Kenworthy, Royal Air Force
- Chief Petty Officer Engineering Technician Martin Craib, Royal Navy
- Lieutenant Martin Andrew Head, Royal Navy
- Commander Oliver Hucker, Royal Navy
- Petty Officer Richard James Paul Jenkins, Royal Navy
- Chief Petty Officer Warfare Specialist Glenn Thompson, Royal Navy
- Corporal Frazer Duncan Berry, Intelligence Corps
- Sergeant (now Colour Sergeant) James Alain Chissel, The Royal Irish Regiment
- Lieutenant Colonel Darren Edward Dempsey, The Royal Logistic Corps
- Acting Major (now Captain) Jonathon Oliver Norfield, Corps of Royal Engineers
- Corporal Oluwabunmi Daniel Ojo, The Royal Logistic Corps
- Acting Major (now Major) Sam Patterson, The Royal Logistic Corps
- Lieutenant Colonel Andrew David Pearce, The Rifles
- Lance Corporal Max Richardson, Intelligence Corps
- Lieutenant Colonel Jonathan Andrew Round, Royal Army Medical Corps
- Rifleman Daniel Lee Rowe, The Rifles
- Captain Malcolm Alexander Scott, The Royal Logistic Corps
- Major Simon Christopher Scott, The Light Dragoons
- Colour Sergeant Warren Aiden Keith Swain, The Princess of Wales’s Royal Regiment
- Lieutenant Colonel Martin Gerard Windsor, The Royal Logistic Corps
- Squadron Leader Samantha Anne Murray, Royal Air Force
- Major Mads Fogh Rasmussen, Danish Army

== Order of St John ==
Order of St John ribbon

=== Bailiff of the Order of St John ===
- Dr. Steven Alan Evans
- Professor Deon François Schõnland Fourie

=== Dame of the Order of St John ===
- Her Grace The Duchess of Argyll
- The Rt Hon. Dame Alcyion Cynthia Kiro, GNZM, QSO

=== Knight of the Order of St John ===
- David William McCorkell
- Alderman Vincent Keaveny

=== Commander of the Order of St John ===
- Brian James Clare
- Carl Makins
- Jonathan Joseph Mannion
- Joyce Millington
- Terence Alan Millington
- Prebendary Peter John Roberts
- Raymond Williams
- Franco Cassar

=== Member of the Order of St John ===
- Alderman Alison Jane Gowman
- Alderman Nicholas Stephen Leland Lyons
