= 1993 Special Honours =

British government recognitions

As part of the British honours system, Special Honours are issued at the Monarch's pleasure at any given time. The Special Honours refer to the awards made within royal prerogative, operational honours and other honours awarded outside the New Years Honours and Birthday Honours.

== Life Peer ==
Barons

- Simon Haskel.
- The Right Honourable Sir Anthony John Leslie Lloyd.

== Knight Bachelor ==
- The Honourable Mr. Justice (Anthony Peter) Clarke
- The Honourable Mr. Justice (Anthony David) Colman
- The Honourable Mr. Justice (William Marcus) Gage.

== Royal Victorian Order ==
=== Knight Commander of the Royal Victorian Order (KCVO) ===
- John Allan Birch, C.M.G.

=== Commander of the Royal Victorian Order (CVO) ===
- Howard John Stredder Pearce.

=== Lieutenant of the Royal Victorian Order (LVO) ===
- Joan Kathleen, Mrs. Jackson, M.V.O.
- Miss Sarah Caroline Rowland Jones.
- Miss Sheila Margaret MacTaggart.

=== Member of the Royal Victorian Order (MVO) ===
- William Hume James Blanchard.

== Most Excellent Order of the British Empire ==
Ribbon bar of the Order of the British Empire (Military)

Ribbon bar of the Order of the British Empire (Civil)

=== Commander of the Order of the British Empire (CBE) ===
Military Division

- Brigadier (now Major-General) Marston Eustace Tickell, M.B.E., M.C. (314396) (late Royal Engineers).

=== Officer of the Order of the British Empire (OBE) ===
Military Division

- Lieutenant-Colonel Thomas Anthony Boam (424271) Scots Guards.
- Lieutenant-Colonel Derek Harvey Bowen, M.B.E. (407765) Corps of Royal Engineers.
- Lieutenant-Colonel Alistair Dennis (420824) 16th/5th The Queen's Royal Lancers.
- Lieutenant-Colonel Peter Miles Welsh, M.C. (418431) The Royal Green Jackets.

=== Member of the Order of the British Empire (MBE) ===
Military Division

- Major Patrick Michael Beaumont (440421), The Parachute Regiment.
- 24199129 Warrant Officer Class II Ernest Frederick Cox, Ulster Defence Regiment.
- Captain Peter David Hawkins, The Corps of Royal Marines.
- Captain (Quartermaster) Robert Stuart Hay, B.E.M. (485128) The Gordon Highlanders.
- Captain Ian Neil Osborne (479314), Royal Corps of Transport.
- 22214413 W arrant Officer Class I Albert Pickles, Coldstream Guards.
- Major Alexander Norman McLeod Scott (455179), The Gordon Highlanders.
- 22205578 Warrant Officer Class I Lewis Derek Stratford, The Life Guards.

== George Medal (GM) ==
- 23532442 Warrant Officer Class II John Michael Coldrick, Royal Army Ordnance Corps.
- Lieutenant (Acting Captain) Hugh David McCormack (482966), Royal Army Ordnance Corps.
- Captain Michael Frederick Stagey (476643) Royal Army Ordnance Corps.
- 23652753 Warrant Officer Class II Colin Bernard Tennant, Royal Army Ordnance Corps.

== Distinguished Service Order (DSO) ==
- Lieutenant-Colonel Jeremy Calcott Reilly (433223), The Royal Regiment of Fusiliers.

== Military Cross (MC) ==
- Captain (now Major) John Anthony Charteris (468963), The Royal Scots (The Royal Regiment).
- Major John Muir Clavering (465919), Scots Guards.
- Major Ian Stephen Creamer (475019), Royal Army Medical Corps.
- Captain (now Major) Ian Maxwell Tomes (465844), The Royal Regiment of Fusiliers.
- Lieutenant John Maldwyn Watkins, The Corps of Royal Marines.

== Distinguished Conduct Medal (DCM) ==
- 22502533 Warrant Officer Class II Ronald Michael Kenny, The King's Regiment.
- 24128884 Corporal Raymond David Shorthouse, The Royal Regiment of Fusiliers.

== Military Medal (MM) ==
- 24064064 Lance Corporal (acting Corporal) Louis Clive Barnett, The Royal Regiment of Fusiliers.
- RM 22703 Sergeant Ralph Charles Dyke, The Corps of Royal Marines.
- 24093625 Lance Corporal (acting Corporal) Neville Robert Robson, The Light Infantry.

== Mentioned in Despatches ==
Palm of the Mentioned in Despatches

Army Department

- Major (acting Lieutenant-Colonel) David John Atkinson (433287), Royal Regiment of Artillery.
- Reverend Peter Bayley (489267), C.F. 4th Class, Royal Army Chaplain's Department.
- Lieutenant Harry William Beaves (485671), Royal Regiment of Artillery.
- 23861026 Sergeant Laurence Hugh Beesley, 16th/5th The Queen's Royal Lancers.
- Major Robert John Bewell (445792), The Gloucestershire Regiment.
- Captain David Arnold Kellett Biggart (481643), The Royal Regiment of Fusiliers.
- 23882270 Sergeant John David Blanchette, The Queen's Regiment.
- Captain Percy Robert Brewis (470028), Royal Corps of Signals.
- Lieutenant Christopher Marten Brightman (487820), 16th/5th The Queen's Royal Lancers.
- Captain Kenneth John Brown (485510), Royal Army Medical Corps.
- Major Anthony Michael Child (448931), Royal Regiment of Artillery.
- Captain Anthony Humphreys Clark (481746), The Parachute Regiment.
- Captain Keith Maxwell Cook (479195), The Royal Regiment of Fusiliers.
- Captain Francis Xavier Erdozain (485624), Royal Regiment of Artillery.
- Major Simon John Furness (448962), The Light Infantry.
- Lieutenant-Colonel Richard Eustace John Gerrard-Wright, O.B.E. (407841), The Royal Anglian Regiment.
- Captain Roger Michael Greenhouse (472549), The Royal Regiment of Fusiliers.
- 24169572 Lance Corporal Robert Francis Halford, The King's Regiment.
- 24144029 Trooper Brian George Hansell, 14th/20th King's Hussars.
- 24093203 Corporal John Ingham Hirst, The Parachute Regiment.
- 24153790 Private William Lorimer Hornal, The Gordon Highlanders.
- 24157719 Driver Steven Paul Hosgood, Royal Corps of Transport.
- 23891162 Lance Corporal of Horse Kensley Christopher Hughes, The Blues and Royals (Royal Horse Guards and 1st Dragoons).
- Lieutenant Iain Alexander Johnstone (485762), The Royal Scots (The Royal Regiment).
- 24071569 Corporal Peter Matthew Richard Leggat, Intelligence Corps.
- Major Nigel John Lewis (453515), The Royal Anglian Regiment.
- 23928525 Sergeant John Patterson Macdonald, Scots Guards.
- 24058439 Lance Corporal Peter Royston Maile, Royal Army Ordnance Corps.
- 24211039 Rifleman Leo Murray, The Royal Green Jackets.
- 24054329 Corporal John Neil, The Royal Scots (The Royal Regiment).
- 24203734 Private Keith Newton, The Gordon High- landers.
- 22410300 Fusilier Alan Christopher Peterson, The Royal Regiment of Fusiliers.
- Captain (acting Major) Richard Folliott Powell (469188), Welsh Guards.
- 23523406 Sergeant Philip John Price, (deceased), Welsh Guards.
- Captain (Quartermaster) Basil Wilfred Rimmer (481610), The Royal Green Jackets.
- 22842835 Staff Sergeant John Ruddy (deceased), Ulster Defence Regiment.
- 24135127 Lance Corporal (acting Corporal) David John Shepherd, The Royal Green Jackets.
- 23662370 Corporal of Horse Stuart Frank Sibley, The Blues and Royals (Royal Horse Guards and 1st Dragoons).
- 23735333 Staff Sergeant Allan Frederick Simpson, The Prince of Wales's Own Regiment of Yorkshire.
- Lieutenant John Douglas Sneezy (485928), The Royal Regiment of Fusiliers.
- Major Ian Oliver John Sprackling (451321), RoyalCorps of Signals.
- 23879384 Lance Corporal (acting Corporal) Robert Duncan Stewart, Welsh Guards.
- 23886830 Corporal Sikeli Vakalala, Royal Corps of Transport.
- Major Christopher Harold Van der Noot (463410), The Gordon Highlanders.
- Major Paul Philip Young (420965), The Royal Anglian Regiment.
