= Fowey (disambiguation) =

Fowey is a town and civil parish in Cornwall, England.

Fowey may also refer to:

- River Fowey, Cornwall, England
- Fowey railway station, Fowey, Cornwall, a former station
- HMS Fowey, various Royal Navy ships
- Fowey (1798 ship), an armed cutter hired by the Royal Navy (1798–1800), later a privateer
- Fowey (UK Parliament constituency)
