= 1982 Special Honours =

British government recognitions

As part of the British honours system, Special Honours are issued at the Monarch's pleasure at any given time. The Special Honours refer to the awards made within royal prerogative, operational honours and other honours awarded outside the New Years Honours and Birthday Honours.

== Victoria Cross (VC) ==
- Lieutenant Colonel Herbert Jones, O.B.E. (465788), The Parachute Regiment
- 24210031 Sergeant Ian John McKay, The Parachute Regiment.

== Life Peer ==
- Admiral of the Fleet Sir Terence Thornton Lewin, GCB, MVO, DSC, Lately Chief of the Defence Staff.

== Most Excellent Order of the British Empire ==
Ribbon bar of the Order of the British Empire (Military)

Ribbon bar of the Order of the British Empire Civil)

=== Knight Commander of the Order of the British Empire (KBE) ===
Civil Division

- The Honourable Mr Justice Guy Stephen Montague Green

=== Commander of the Order of the British Empire (CBE) ===
Military Division

Army

- Brigadier Patrick Frank Blair Hargrave, O.B.E. (431873), Staff, late The Worcestershire and Sherwood Foresters Regiment (29th/45th Foot).
- Colonel Eric Montefort Westropp (456002), Staff, late The Royal Hussars (Prince of Wales's Own).

=== Officer of the Order of the British Empire (OBE) ===
Military Division

Royal Navy

- Commander Thomas Anthony Allen,
- Commander Lionel Stuart Joseph Barry.
- Commander Peter Stanley Birch.
- Major Robert James Bruce, Royal Marines.
- Major John Shane Chester, Royal Marines.
- Commander Michael Cudmore.
- Captain John Barrie Dickinson, Royal Fleet Auxiliary.
- Commander Frederick Brian Goodson.
- Commander Lister Theodore Hickson.
- Surgeon Lieutenant Commander (Acting Surgeon Commander) Richard Tadeusz Jolly.
- Commander Christopher John Esplin-Jones.
- Captain John Stuart Kelly, M.B.E.
- Commander David Arthur Henry Kerr.
- Commander Martin Leonard Ladd.
- Captain Peter James McCarthy, Royal Fleet Auxiliary.
- Commander Peter John McGregor.
- Major David John Minords, Royal Marines.
- Commander Andrew William Netherclift, Royal Navy.
- Commander (Acting Captain) Anthony James Oglesby.
- Captain Gilbert Paul Overbury, Royal Fleet Auxiliary.
- Commander George Sheddon Pearson.
- Captain Shane Redmond, Royal Fleet Auxiliary.
- Commander Andrew Stephen Ritchie.
- The Reverend Anthony McPherson Ross.
- Commander Robert Austin Rowley.
- Commander Jeremy Thomas Sanders.
- Commander Ronald James Sandford.
- Major James Maurice Guy Sheridan, Royal Marines.
- Commander Donald William Shrubb.
- Major Simon Ewen Southby-Tailyour, Royal Marines.
- Major Jonathan James Thomson, Royal Marines.
- Commander Christopher Watkin Williams.
- Commander George Anthony Charles Woods.
- Captain Christopher Anthony Purtcher-Wydenbruck, Royal Fleet Auxiliary.

Army

- Lieutenant Colonel Anthony Edward Berry (459211), The Royal Green Jackets.
- Lieutenant Colonel Ivar Jack Hellberg (472558), Royal Corps of Transport.
- Major (Now Lieutenant Colonel) Peter John Hubert, M.B.E. (467580), The Queen's Regiment.
- Lieutenant Colonel William Stewart Petrie McGregor (462291), Royal Army Medical Corps.
- Lieutenant Colonel David Patrick de Courcy Morgan (461477), 7th Duke of Edinburgh's Own Gurkha Rifles.
- Lieutenant Colonel Alexander Douglas Morton Ogilvie (458722), the Queen's Lancashire Regiment.
- Lieutenant Colonel John Francis Rickett, M.B.E. (461643), Welsh Guards.
- Lieutenant Colonel (Quartermaster) Patrick John Saunders (485226), Corps of Royal Engineers.
- Lieutenant Colonel Michael John Holroyd Smith (460614), Royal Regiment of Artillery.
- Lieutenant Colonel Ronald Welsh (470783), Royal Army Medical Corps.
- Lieutenant Colonel Geoffrey Melville Youll (464377), The Royal Regiment of Fusiliers.

Royal Air Force

- Wing Commander Anthony John Crowther Bagnall (608630).
- Wing Commander David Llewellyn Baugh (608336).
- Wing Commander Peter Fry, M.B.E. (4181201).
- Squadron Leader Brian Sydney Morris, A.F.C. (4232141).
- Wing Commander Joseph Kerr Sim, A.F.C. (608065).
- Wing Commander Anthony Peter Slinger (4142065).
- Wing Commander Charles Julian Sturt (607859).
- Wing Commander Brian James Weaver (586716).

=== Member of the Order of the British Empire (MBE) ===
Military Division

Army

- Major Anthony Brian Spencer Collings (484639), The Devonshire and Dorset Regiment
- 23664849 Warrant Officer Class 2 Bernard Thomas Humberstone, The Royal Hussars (Prince of Wales's Own) now Captain (Quartermaster) (513832) The Wessex Yeomanry, Territorial Army.
- 24216908 Warrant Officer Class 2 John Kerr, M.M., Ulster Defence Regiment.
- Captain (Garrison Engineer) Hugh Mostyn Morgan (507217), Corps of Royal Engineers.
- Captain Malcolm James Rees, M.M. (508695), Special Air Service Regiment.
- 23689425 Warrant Officer Class 1 Colin Leslie Wilson, Intelligence Corps.

== Distinguished Service Order (DSO) ==
- Commodore Samuel Clark Dunlop C.B.E., Royal Fleet Auxiliary.
- Captain Michael Ernest Barrow, Royal Navy.
- Captain John Jeremy Black M.B.E., Royal Navy.
- Captain William Robert Canning, Royal Navy.
- Captain John Francis Coward, Royal Navy.
- Major Cedric Norman George Delves (485712), The Devonshire and Dorset Regiment.
- Captain Peter George Valentine Dingemans, Royal Navy.
- Major Christopher Patrick Benedict Keeble (475184), The Parachute Regiment.
- Captain Edmund Shackleton Jeremy Larken, Royal Navy.
- Captain Christopher Hope Layman, M.V.O., Royal Navy.
- Captain Linley Eric Middleton, A.D.C., Royal Navy.
- Captain David Pentreath, Royal Navy.
- Lieutenant Colonel Hew William Royston Pike, M.B.E. (472599), The Parachute Regiment.
- Captain Philip Jeremy George Roberts, Royal Fleet Auxiliary.
- Lieutenant Colonel Michael Ian Eldon Scott (467628), Scots Guards
- Lieutenant Colonel Nicholas Francis Vaux, Royal Marines.
- Lieutenant Colonel Andrew Francis Whitehead, Royal Marines.
- Commander Christopher Louis Wreford-Brown, Royal Navy.
- Lieutenant Commander Brian Frederick Dutton, Q.G.M., Royal Navy.

== Distinguished Service Cross (DSC) ==
- Captain Ian Harry North, Merchant Navy.
- Lieutenant Commander Gordon Walter James Batt, Royal Navy.
- Lieutenant Commander John Stuart Woodhead, Royal Navy.
- Lieutenant Commander John Murray Sephton, Royal Navy.
- Captain George Robert Green, Royal Fleet Auxiliary.
- Captain David Everett Lawrence, Royal Fleet Auxiliary.
- Captain Anthony Francis Pitt, Royal Fleet Auxiliary.
- Commander Paul Jeffrey Bootherstone, Royal Navy.
- Commander Christopher John Sinclair Craig, Royal Navy.
- Commander Anthony Morton, Royal Navy.
- Commander Nicholas John Tobin, Royal Navy.
- Commander Nigel David Ward, A.F.C., Royal Navy.
- Commander Alan William John West, Royal Navy.
- Lieutenant Commander Andrew Donaldson Auld, Royal Navy.
- Lieutenant Commander Michael Dennison Booth, Royal Navy.
- Lieutenant Commander Hugh Sinclair Clark, Royal Navy
- Lieutenant Commander Hugh John Lomas, Royal Navy.
- Lieutenant Commander Neil Wynell Thomas, Royal Navy.
- Lieutenant Commander Simon Clive Thornewill, Royal Navy.
- Lieutenant Alan Reginald Courtenay Bennett, Royal Navy.
- Lieutenant Nigel Arthur Bruen, Royal Navy.
- Lieutenant Richard Hutchings, Royal Marines.
- Lieutenant Nigel John North, Royal Navy.
- Lieutenant Stephen Robert Thomas, Royal Navy.
- Sub Lieutenant Peter Thomas Morgan, Royal Navy.
- 23675237 Warrant Officer Class 2 John Henry Phillips, Corps of Royal Engineers
- Fleet Chief Petty Officer (Diver) Michael George Fellows, B.E.M. J944234N.
- Flight Lieutenant David Henry Spencer Morgan 5200931, Royal Air Force, 899 Naval Air Squadron.

== Military Cross (MC) ==
- Major Michael Hugh Argue (495605), The Parachute Regiment.
- Major Charles Peter Cameron, Royal Marines.
- Major David Alan Collett (482704), The Parachute Regiment.
- Major John Harry Crosland (483886), The Parachute Regiment.
- Major Charles Dair Farrar-Hockley (483902), The Parachute Regiment
- Major John Panton Kiszely (486680), Scots Guards.
- Captain Peter Murray Babbington, Royal Marines.
- Captain Timothy William Burls (491132), The Parachute Regiment.
- Captain Gavin John Hamilton (499793), The Green Howards (Alexandra, Princess of Wales's Own Yorkshire Regiment).
- Captain William Andrew McCracken (501653), Royal Regiment of Artillery.
- Captain Aldwin James Glendinning Wight (501023), Welsh Guards.
- Lieutenant Colin Spencer Connor (509087), The Parachute Regiment.
- Lieutenant Clive Idris Dytor, Royal Marines.
- Lieutenant Robert Alasdair Davidson Lawrence (508365), Scots Guards.
- Lieutenant Christopher Fox, Royal Marines.
- Lieutenant David James Stewart, Royal Marines.

== Distinguished Flying Cross (DFC) ==
- Captain Samuel Murray Drennan (503656) Army Air Corps.
- Captain John Gordon Greenhalgh (497429), Royal Corps of Transport.
- Squadron Leader Richard Ulric Langworthy AFC 3516433, Royal Air Force.
- Squadron Leader Calum Neil McDougall 3144488, Royal Air Force.
- Lieutenant Richard James Nunn, Royal Marines.
- Captain Jeffrey Peter Niblett, Royal Marines.
- Squadron Leader Jeremy John Pook 608507, Royal Air Force.
- Wing Commander Peter Ted Squire AFC 608512, Royal Air Force.
- Flight Lieutenant William Francis Martin Withers 2607689, Royal Air Force.

== Conspicuous Gallantry Medal (CGM) ==
- 23834301 Staff Sergeant James Prescott, Corps of Royal Engineers.

== George Medal (GM) ==
- Second Engineer Officer Paul Anderson Henry, Royal Fleet Auxiliary.

== Air Force Cross (AFC) ==
- Flight Lieutenant Harold Currie Burgoyne 8020990, Royal Air Force.
- Wing Commander David Emerson 4230086, Royal Air Force.
- Lieutenant Commander Douglas John Smiley Squier, Royal Navy.
- Lieutenant Commander Ralph John Stuart Wykes-Sneyd, Royal Navy.
- Squadron Leader Robert Tuxford 608997, Royal Air Force.

== Distinguished Conduct Medal (DCM) ==
- 24355246 Corporal David Abols, The Parachute Regiment
- Corporal Julian Burdett, Royal Marines PO36660J.
- Able Seaman (Radar) John Edward Dillon, D191232P.
- 23951692 Staff Sergeant Brian Faulkner, The Parachute Regiment.
- 24579367 Private Stephen Illingsworth, The Parachute Regiment.
- 24103698 Sergeant John Clifford Meredith, The Parachute Regiment.
- 23867615 Warrant Officer Class 2 William Nicol, Scots Guards.
- 24159222 Sergeant John Stuart Pettinger, The Parachute Regiment.
- 24549305 Guardsman James Boyle Curran Reynolds, Scots Guards.

== Queen's Gallantry Medal (QGM) ==
- 24317545 Lance Corporal (now Corporal) Richard Charles Acott, Corps of Royal Engineers.
- Chief Engineer Officer Charles Kenneth Arthur Adams, Royal Fleet Auxiliary.
- Lieutenant John Kenneth Boughton, Royal Navy.
- Marine Engineering Artificer (M) 1st Class Kenneth Enticknapp, D113547S.
- Third Officer Andrew Gudgeon, Royal Fleet Auxiliary.
- Acting Colour Sergeant Brian Johnston, Royal Marines, PO23116X.
- K8000244 Flight Sergeant Brian William Jopling, Royal Air Force.
- Major James Gordon Kerr (490901), Intelligence Corps.
- Petty Officer Medical Assistant Gerald Andrew Meager, D127245D.
- Lieutenant Philip James Sheldon, Royal Navy.
- Flight Lieutenant Alan James Swan 68568S, Royal Air Force.
- 23947081 Warrant Officer Class 2 James Osmund Unsworth, Royal Army Ordnance Corps.
- Third Engineer Brian Robert Williams, Merchant Navy.

== Distinguished Service Medal (DSM) ==
- Petty Officer Marine Engineering Mechanic (M) David Richard Briggs D13481S7
- Acting Corporal Aircrewman Michael David Love, Royal Marines P035079S.
- Colour Sergeant Michael James Francis, Royal Marines P021992F.
- Chief Marine Engineering Mechanic (M) Michael David Townsend, K984117P.
- Chief Petty Officer (Diver) Graham Michael Trotter, D089894B.
- Chief Petty Officer Aircrewman Malcolm John Tupper, D083002W.
- Petty Officer John Steven Leake D197741A.
- Sergeant William John Leslie, Royal Marines P023234T.
- Acting Petty Officer (Sonar) (SM) Graham John Robert Libby, D152458V.
- Leading Aircrewman Peter Blair Imrie, D134900T.
- Leading Seaman (Radar) Jeffrey David Warren ,D133771A

== Military Medal (MM) ==
- 23929678 Warrant Officer Class 2 Brian Thomas Neck, Welsh Guards.
- 24093381 Sergeant Terence Irving Barrett, The Parachute Regiment.
- 24172118 Sergeant Derrick Sidney Boultby, Royal Corps of Transport.
- Sergeant Thomas Collings, Royal Marines P029088B.
- Sergeant Michael Collins, Royal Marines P027813G.
- 24093340 Sergeant Desmond Fuller, The Parachute Regiment.
- 24185654 Sergeant Robert White Jackson, Scots Guards.
- 23963008 Sergeant Joseph Gordon Mather, Special Air Service Regiment.
- 23952578 Sergeant Peter Hurcliche Rene Naya, Royal Army Medical Corps.
- Sergeant Joseph Desmond Wassell, Royal Marines.
- 24196881 Sergeant Roman Hugh Wrega, Corps of Royal Engineers.
- 24438472 Corporal Ian Phillip Bailey, The Parachute Regiment.
- 24068607 Corporal Trevor Brookes, Royal Corps of Signals.
- 24325093 Corporal Thomas James Camp, The Parachute Regiment.
- Corporal Michael Eccles, Royal Marines, P028263C.
- 24440296 Corporal John Anthony Foran, Corps of Royal Engineers.
- 24252527 Corporal Thomas William Harley, The Parachute Regiment.
- Corporal David Hunt, Royal Marines, P035637B.
- Corporal Stephen Charles Newland, Royal Marines, P030503S.
- Corporal Harry Siddall, Royal Marines, P027128B.
- Corporal Chrystie Nigel Hanslip Ward, Royal Marines, P031958E.
- Acting Corporal Andrew Ronald Bishop, Royal Marines, P037457N.
- 24511890 Lance Corporal Stephen Alan Bardsley, The Parachute Regiment
- 24174900 Lance Corporal Martin William Lester Bentley, The Parachute Regiment.
- 24347663 Lance Corporal Gary David Bingley, The Parachute Regiment.
- 24498706 Lance Corporal Dale John Loveridge, Welsh Guards.
- 24464323 Lance Corporal Leslie James Leonard Standish, The Parachute Regiment.
- 24S470SS Private Richard John de Mansfield Absolon, The Parachute Regiment.
- 24608372 Private Graham Stuart Carter, The Parachute Regiment.
- 24521305 Private Barry James Grayling, The Parachute Regiment.
- 24167965 Bombardier Edward Morris Holt, Royal Regiment of Artillery.
- 24599314 Guardsman Stephen Mark Chapman, Welsh Guards.
- 24408498 Guardsman Andrew Samuel Pengelly, Scots Guards.
- Marine Gary William Marshall, Royal Marines, P041435J.

== British Empire Medal (BEM) ==
Military Division

- 24196571 Sergeant Mervin Rudolph Bassett, Corps of Royal Engineers.
- 24021383 Staff Sergeant Albert Edward Eastwood, Royal Army Ordnance Corps.
- 24302290 Corporal (Acting Sergeant) Michael Emberson, The Parachute Regiment.
- 24216292 Corporal James McCandless, Ulster Defence Regiment

== Air Force Medal (AFM) ==
- 24136567 Sergeant (now Staff Sergeant) Ian Shoobridge, Army Air Corps.

== Distinguished Flying Medal (DFM) ==
- Sergeant William Christopher O'Brien, Royal Marines PO30684R.

== Queen's Commendation for Brave Conduct ==
- Marine Paul Anthony Cruden, Royal Marines P040123Y
- Petty Officer Class 2 Boleslaw Czarnecki, Merchant Navy
- Chief Marine Engineering Mechanic (L) Alan Frank Fazackerley, D093379J.
- Weapon Engineering Mechanic (R) 1st Class John Richard Jesson, D182970E.
- Petty Officer Weapon Engineering Mechanic (R) Graeme John Lowden, D109859U.
- Sergeant William Allun Morgan, Royal Marines, PO21689W
- Second Officer Ian Povey, Royal Fleet Auxiliary.
- Chief Weapon Engineering Mechanic (R) William Rumsey, D070938J.
- P8183010 Senior Aircraftman Kenneth James Soppett-Moss, Royal Air Force.
- Radio Operator (Tactical) 1st Class David Frederick Sullivan, D158457W.
- Marine Engineering Mechanician (M) 1st Class Thomas Arthur Sutton, D012657Q.
- L8171807 Junior Technician Adrian Thorne, Royal Air Force.
- Acting Colour Sergeant David Alfred Watkins, Royal Marines, P023317B.

== Mentioned in Despatches ==
Palm of the Mentioned in Despatches

- 2416S24S Sergeant Ian Aird, The Parachute Regiment.
- 24519233 Private Simon John Alexander, The Parachute Regiment.
- Lieutenant Colonel James Anderson (472326), Royal Army Medical Corps.
- Lieutenant (Acting Captain) Brian Armstrong (509019), Ulster Defence Regiment.
- 24325221 Corporal Raymond Ernest Armstrong, The Royal Green Jackets (Posthumous).
- Radio Operator (Tactical) 1st Class, Richard John Ash, D179252P.
- Petty Officer Aircrewman Alan Ashdown, D113217K.
- Marine Robert Bainbridge, Royal Marines, P027011B.
- Flight Lieutenant Edward Henry Ball 5201241, Royal Air Force.
- Petty Officer Aircrewman John Arthur Balls, BEM, D105972F.
- Lieutenant Philip James Barber, Royal Navy.
- Sub Lieutenant Richard John Barker, Royal Navy.
- Marine Nicholas John Barnett, Royal Marines, P038293A.
- Sergeant Peter Beevers, Royal Marines, P026130T.
- Chief Air Engineering Artificer (M) Richard John Bentley, D065863N.
- Major The Honourable Richard Nicholas Bethel M.B.E. (490483), Scots Guards.
- Acting Leading Medical Assistant George Black, D156353Y.
- Lieutenant Commander Michael Stephen Blissett, Royal Navy.
- Lance Corporal Peter William Boorn, Royal Marines, P037261V.
- Acting Leading Marine Engineering Mechanic (M) Craig Robert Boswell, D166924U.
- Captain Anthony Peter Bourne (495483), Royal Regiment of Artillery.
- Sergeant Ian William Brice, Royal Marines, P027697Y.
- Chief Officer John Keith Brocklehurst, Merchant Navy.
- 24565119 Private Andrew Ernest Brooke, The Parachute Regiment.
- Able Seaman (Missile) Nicholas Scott Brotherton, D176347N.
- 24574504 Driver Mark Brough, Royal Corps of Transport.
- Captain Christopher Charles Brown (497571), Royal Regiment of Artillery.
- Corporal Christopher John Graham Brown, Royal Marines, P033816X.
- 24587118 Guardsman Gary Brown, Scots Guards.
- 24254951 Corporal James Hanah Brown, The Royal Anglian Regiment.
- Warrant Officer Class 2 Robert John Brown, Royal Marines, P021729L.
- Lieutenant Commander Barry William Bryant, Royal Navy.
- Captain Ian Anderson Bryden (498672), Scots Guards.
- Sergeant Edward Lindsay Buckley, Royal Marines, P025425T.
- Marine Engineering Artificer (H) 1st Class Derek Adrian Bugden, D087152F.
- Captain Bernard Lawrence Bunting (504432), The Green Howards (Alexandra, Princess of Wales's Own Yorkshire Regiment).
- Sergeant Brian Gordon Burgess, Royal Marines, P037926M.
- Petty Officer Aircrewman Richard Burnett, D183515C.
- Lieutenant (now Captain) Leslie Christopher Burrlock (509336), The Devonshire and Dorset Regiment.
- Lieutenant Commander Robert Gerwyn Burrows, Royal Navy.
- Lieutenant Nicholas Abraham Marsh Butler, Royal Navy.
- Major William Keith Butler (481739), Royal Corps of Signals.
- Sergeant Edgar Robert Candlish, Royal Marines, P031726H.
- Lieutenant Christian Thomas Gordon Caroe, Royal Marines.
- 23891099 Staff Sergeant William Henry Carpenter, Special Air Service Regiment.
- Marine Engineering Mechanic (M) 1st Class Lee Cartwright, D166332T.
- 24473145 Lance Corporal Leonard Allan Carver, The Parachute Regiment.
- 23834337 Warrant Officer Class 2 (now Acting Warrant Officer Class 1) Clifford John Castree, Corps of Royal Engineers.
- Lieutenant Commander John Sydney Maurice Chandler, Royal Navy.
- Lieutenant (Queen's Gurkha Officer) Chandrakumar Pradhan (511108), 7th Duke of Edinburgh's Own Gurkha Rifles.
- Marine Engineering Mechanic (M) 1st Class Michael Lindsay Chiplen, D169374E.
- Lieutenant Commander John Normanton Clark, Royal Navy.
- Captain Moira Boyne Clarke (499077), Ulster Defence Regiment
- 24115457 Sergeant (Acting Staff Sergeant) Robert Douglas Clay, Royal Army Ordnance Corps.
- Lieutenant Christopher Hugh Trevor Clayton, Royal Navy.
- Captain Michael Anthony Falle Cole, Royal Marines.
- 24066769 Staff Sergeant Trevor Collins, Corps of Royal Engineers.
- Marine David Stanley Combes, Royal Marines, P037746K.
- 24472422 Private Kevin Patrick Connery, The Parachute Regiment.
- Corporal Gordon Cooke, Royal Marines, P024499L.
- Chaplain to the Forces Third Class David Cooper (495866), Royal Army Chaplains' Department.
- Sergeant Robert Terence Cooper, Royal Marines, P027420D.
- Able Seaman (Missile) Andrew Coppell, D167857W.
- Lieutenant Mark Rudolph Coreth (506827), The Blues and Royals (Royal Horse Guards and 1st Dragoons).
- 24565221 Private Adam Michael Corneille, The Parachute Regiment.
- 24217216 Corporal Ian Clifford Corrigan, Corps of Royal Electrical and Mechanical Engineers.
- Lieutenant Commander Gervais Richard Arthur Coryton, Royal Navy.
- Lieutenant Mark Townsend Cox (511695), The Parachute Regiment.
- Lieutenant Ronald Lindsay Crawford, Royal Marines.
- Marine Engineering Mechanic (M) 1st Class Christopher Crowley, D168185G.
- 23948859 Staff Sergeant Phillip Preston Currass Q.G.M., Royal Army Medical Corps (Posthumous).
- Lieutenant William Alan Curtis, Royal Navy (Posthumous).
- Marine Garry Cuthell, Royal Marines, P036511U.
- 24327863 Lance Sergeant Alan Charles Ewing Dalgleish, Scots Guards.
- Sergeant Graham Dance, Royal Marines, P041201U.
- 24441081 Lance Corporal Neal John Dance, The Parachute Regiment.
- Marine Leslie Daniels, Royal Marines, P038702U.
- Major Romilly Edmund Humphrey David, M.B.E. (483793), Welsh Guards.
- 24164306 Lance Sergeant Ian Davidson, Scots Guards.
- Colour Sergeant Barrie Davies, Royal Marines, P020357M.
- Sergeant Colin Charles De Lacour, Q.G.M. Royal Marines, P024604K.
- Major Peter Eastaway Dennison (485714), The Parachute Regiment.
- 23942650 Staff Sergeant George Kenneth Dixon, Royal Regiment of Artillery.
- Sergeant Brian DOliveira, Royal Marines, P028117H.
- 24460571 Piper Steven William Duffy, Scots Guards.
- Marine Stephen Duggan, Royal Marines, P029137R.
- 24384481 Lance Corporal Kevin Peter Dunbar, The Parachute Regiment.
- Lieutenant-Colonel Richard Phillip Thomas Earle (459247), The Royal Regiment of Fusiliers.
- Lieutenant Andrew John Ebbens, Royal Marines.
- 24444973 Gunner Gary Eccleston, Royal Regiment of Artillery.
- Marine Engineering Mechanic (M) 1st Class David John Edwards, D169378U.
- Weapon Engineering Artificer 1st Class Anthony Charles Eggington, D076798T ((Posthumous).
- Squadron Leader John Geoffrey Elliott 608743, Royal Air Force.
- Petty Officer Marine Engineering Mechanic (M) John Richard Ellis, D077493B.
- Sub Lieutenant Richard Charles Emly, Royal Navy (Posthumous).
- Captain Martin Patrick Entwistle (510418), Royal Army Medical Corps.
- Sergeant Andrew Peter Evans, Royal Marines, P025446U (Posthumous).
- Lieutenant Colonel Keith Richard Hubert Eve (397236), Royal Regiment of Artillery.
- Captain Paul Raymond Farrar (497688), The Parachute Regiment.
- Commander Robert Duncan Ferguson, Royal Navy.
- Lieutenant William James Truman Fewtrell, Royal Navy.
- Sergeant Ian David Fisk, Royal Marines, P028197B.
- Midshipman Mark Thomas Fletcher, Royal Navy.
- 24598563 Private Mark William Fletcher, The Parachute Regiment (Posthumous).
- 24328155 Corporal David Ford, Corps of Royal Engineers.
- Weapons Engineering Artificer 2nd Class Jonathan Martin Charles Foy, D147831X.
- 23953947 Warrant Officer Class 2 John Francis, Royal Regiment of Artillery.
- Lieutenant David Peart Frankland (505966), Royal Corps of Transport.
- Lieutenant Commander Rodney Vincent Frederiksen, Royal Navy.
- Lieutenant Commander David Gordon Garwood, Royal Navy.
- Lance Corporal Barry Gilbert, Royal Marines, P040829B.
- 24435699 Lance Corporal Roy Gillon, Corps of Royal Engineers.
- Chief Marine Engineering Artificer (H) Keith William Goldie, D098612T.
- Marine Leonard John Goldsmith, Royal Marines, P041637T.
- 24472119 Private (now Lance Corporal) Darren John Gough, The Parachute Regiment.
- Leading Seaman (Missile) Robert Marshall Gould, D142490P.
- 4386530 Lance Sergeant David Graham, Welsh Guards.
- Sub Lieutenant David Edgar Graham, Royal Navy.
- Chief Petty Officer (Ops)(M) Eric Graham, D093155W.
- Flight Lieutenant Gordon Carnie Graham 8026356, Royal Air Force.
- 24554170 Private David Gray, The Parachute Regiment.
- Major Patrick Hector Gullan M.B.E. M.C. (483921), The Parachute Regiment.
- Chief Petty Officer (Diver) Brian Thomas Gunnell, J928008Q.
- Lieutenant Commander Andrew Clive Gwilliam, Royal Navy.
- Lieutenant Fraser Haddow, Royal Marines.
- Sergeant David Keith Hadlow, Royal Marines, P032506X.
- Major Charles Victor Hamill (492339), Ulster Defence Regiment.
- 24154715 Private (Acting Corporal) Joseph Edward Hand, The Parachute Regiment.
- 24088979 Lance Corporal (Acting Corporal) Stephen Paul Harding-Dempster, The Parachute Regiment.
- Flight Lieutenant Mark William James Hare 5202373, Royal Air Force.
- 24399337 Corporal David Hardman, The Parachute Regiment (Posthumous).
- 24428182 Private Patrick John Harley, The Parachute Regiment.
- Leading Aircrewman James Andrew Harper, D157272T.
- Lieutenant-Colonel John Robert Hart, M.B.E. (473533), The Royal Anglian Regiment.
- Acting Leading Marine Engineering Mechanic (M) Stanley William Hathaway, D187590N.
- Major Richard Bruce Hawken (482753), Corps of Royal Engineers.
- Lieutenant Robert Charles Hendicott (501606), Corps of Royal Engineers.
- 24122734 Corporal (Acting Sergeant) Joseph Hill, The Parachute Regiment.
- Chief Officer Peter Ferris Hill, Royal Fleet Auxiliary.
- Marine Graham Hodkinson, Royal Marines, P028769S.
- Major Timothy John Douglas Holmes (480331), 1st The Queen's Dragoon Guards.
- Lieutenant Colonel George Anthony Holt (463176), Royal Regiment of Artillery.
- Lieutenant Robert Ian Horton, Royal Navy.
- 24008055 Warrant Officer Class 2 Graham Hough, Welsh Guards.
- Captain (now Major) Euan Henry Houstoun, M.B.E. (476876), Grenadier Guards.
- 24449606 Lance Bombardier (Acting Bombardier) Owain Dyfnallt Hughes, Royal Regiment of Artillery.
- Captain Stephen James Hughes (504259), Royal Army Medical Corps.
- Lieutenant Commander Laon Stuart Grant Hulme, Royal Navy.
- Sub Lieutenant Paul John Humphreys, Royal Navy.
- Leading Radio Operator (Tactical) Roderick John Hutcheson, D125879S.
- 24438583 Guardsman James Alexander Hutchison, Scots Guards.
- 24298847 Lance Corporal (now Acting Corporal) Barry Stroud Hutt, The Devonshire and Dorset Regiment.
- 24228871 Corporal Stephen Darryl Iles, Corps of Royal Engineers.
- Able Seaman (Missile) Stephen Ingleby, Dl82467J.
- Lieutenant The Lord Robert Anthony Innes-Ker (508197), The Blues and Royals (Royal Horse Guards and 1st Dragoons).
- Lieutenant Commander Ian Inskip, Royal Navy.
- Squadron Leader Robert Douglas Iveson 4233414, Royal Air Force.
- 24130402 Bombardier John Rodney Jackson, Royal Regiment of Artillery.
- Marine Engineering Artificer (H) 1st Class Peter Gerhard Jakeman, D104369N.
- Sergeant Kevin Michael James, Q.G.M. Royal Marines, P025432M.
- Major Graham Jefferies (468642), The Devonshire and Dorset Regiment.
- Flight Lieutenant Alan Tom Jones 593549, Royal Air Force.
- Petty Officer (Missile) Hugh Jones, D076100V.
- 24392508 Gunner Jeffrey Jones, Royal Regiment of Artillery.
- 24501852 Lance Corporal Kenneth Bryan Jones, Royal Corps of Transport.
- 24088121 Sergeant Richard Ryszad Kalinski, The Parachute Regiment.
- Leading Seaman (Diver) Phillip Martin Kearns, D16S223E.
- 23824139 Warrant Officer Class 2 John Malcolm Kendrick, Army Air Corps.
- Lieutenant Commander Robin Sean Gerald Kent, Royal Navy.
- Captain Simon James Knapper (499735), The Staffordshire Regiment (The Prince of Wales's).
- FO681327 Flight Sergeant Derek William Knights, Royal Air Force.
- 23856221 Staff Sergeant (Acting Warrant Officer Class 2) Anthony La Frenais, Special Air Service Regiment.
- Marine Engineering Artificer (M) 1st Class Kevin Stuart Lake, D120231J.
- Major Peter Ralph Lamb, Royal Marines.
- Major Brendan Charles Lambe (492701), Royal Regiment of Artillery.
- Commander Roger Charles Lane-Nott, Royal Navy.
- Able Seaman (Radar) Mark Stanley Leach, D166068N.
- Marine Engineering Artificer 2nd Class David John Leaning, D154240A.
- Lieutenant Herbert John Ledingham, Royal Navy.
- 24464559 Lance Corporal Paul Anthony Legg, The Royal Regiment of Fusiliers.
- Sergeant William David Paul Lewis, Royal Marines, P028215X.
- Lieutenant Commander John Andrew Lister, Royal Navy.
- Lieutenant Clive Ralph Livingstone (500967), Corps of Royal Engineers.
- Lieutenant David Anthony Lord, Royal Navy.
- Commander Thomas Maitland Le Marchand, Royal Navy.
- 24355078 Lance Corporal Christopher Keith Lovett, The Parachute Regiment (Posthumous).
- Lieutenant Jonathan George Ormsby Lowe (503127), Royal Corps of Transport.
- 24026186 Staff Sergeant Clive Dennis Lowther, Special Air Service Regiment.
- Lieutenant (Acting Captain) Rupert Henry Charles Lucas (500968), The Royal Anglian Regiment.
- Major Neil Patrick Hayes Macaulay (481817), Royal Regiment of Artillery.
- 23954942 Lance Corporal Duncan MacColl, Scots Guards.
- Major Roderick Macdonald (485776), Corps of Royal Engineers.
- 24498356 Piper Peter Alexander MacInnes, Scots Guards.
- Lieutenant Commander Iain Bruce Mackay, Royal Navy.
- 24462159 Lance Corporal John Daniel Maker, Corps of Royal Engineers.
- Captain Robin John Makeig-Jones (498932), Royal Regiment of Artillery.
- 24551227 Private Andrew Mansfield, The Parachute Regiment.
- Lieutenant Peter Charles Manley, Royal Navy.
- Major Tymothy Alastair Marsh (479123), The Parachute Regiment.
- 24097724 Sergeant Peter James Marshall, Army Catering Corps.
- Chief Petty Officer Airman (AH) Nicholas Charles Martin, D062129D.
- Lieutenant-Colonel Russell Frank Maynard, M.B.E. (465801), Royal Corps of Signals.
- 24400559 Corporal Paul McCarthy, The Royal Regiment of Fusiliers.
- 24199091 Warrant Officer Class 2 Herbert McConville, Ulster Defence Regiment
- 24136114 Staff Sergeant Raphael Francis Joseph McGrath, Corps of Royal Electrical and Mechanical Engineers.
- 24438768 Lance Sergeant Thomas McGuinness, Scots Guards.
- Lieutenant Andrew Neville McHarg, Royal Navy.
- Sergeant Mitchell McIntyre, Royal Marines, P022409Q.
- Corporal Thomas William McMahon, Royal Marines, P030590A.
- Captain Joseph Hugh McManners (495368), Royal Regiment of Artillery.
- 23860783 Sergeant Ernest McWilliams, Ulster Defence Regiment.
- Marine Engineering Mechanician (M) 1st Class Timothy Miles, D104773Q.
- Flying Officer Colin Miller 8027110, Royal Air Force.
- Lieutenant John Andrew Gordon Miller, Royal Navy.
- Lieutenant Paul Graham Miller, Royal Navy.
- Lieutenant Alasdair Macfarlane Mitchell (508221), Scots Guards.
- 24185774 Lance Sergeant Clark Mitchell, Scots Guards (Posthumous).
- Marine Engineering Artificer (M) 1st Class Stephen Derek Mitchell, Dl54261B
- Weapon Engineering Mechanician 1st Class Peter Robert Moir, D077965Y.
- Lieutenant Andrew Gerald Moll, Royal Navy.
- Major Kenneth Beresford Molyneux-Carter (482790), The Royal Regiment of Fusiliers.
- 2nd Lieutenant Ian Charles Moore (511053), The Parachute Regiment.
- Lieutenant Commander Clive Ronald Wellesley Morrell, Royal Navy.
- 24455553 Private Richard Peter George Morrell, The Parachute Regiment.
- Flight Lieutenant Ian Mortimer 5202579, Royal Air Force.
- Sergeant Henry Frederick Napier, Royal Marines, P025932E.
- Lieutenant Commander Kenneth Maclean Napier, Royal Navy.
- Major Philip Neame (499126), The Parachute Regiment.
- Marine Mark Andrew Neat, Royal Marines, P040450H.
- Captain Andrew Bennett Newcombe, Royal Marines.
- Medical Assistant Michael Nicely, D162979K.
- 24372921 Corporal Thomas Kiernan Noble, The Parachute Regiment.
- Marine Geoffrey Nordass, Royal Marines, P038320X.
- Major Michael John Norman, Royal Marines.
- Lieutenant Commander Michael John O'Connell, Royal Navy.
- Marine David Lloyd O'Connor, Royal Marines, P037962R.
- Captain Eugene Joseph O'Kane, Royal Marines.
- Lieutenant Richard John Ormshaw, Royal Navy.
- 24600120 Private Emmanuel O'Rourke, The Parachute Regiment.
- Lieutenant Jonathan David Page (512953), The Parachute Regiment.
- Lieutenant Christopher Laurence Palmer, Royal Navy
- Captain Michael Edward Parle (494450), Royal Army Ordnance Corps.
- 24208305 Warrant Officer Class 2 Hugh Watters Patterson, Ulster Defence Regiment.
- 24049124 Private (Acting Corporal) David John Pearcy, Intelligence Corps.
- Major David Anthony Pennefather, Royal Marines.
- 24400826 Corporal Jeremy Frank Phillips, The Parachute Regiment.
- Captain Andrew Robert Pillar, Royal Marines.
- 24026589 Private (Acting Sergeant) Brian William Pitchforth, The Queen's Regiment.
- Lieutenant Roland Frederick Playford, Royal Marines.
- Lieutenant Christopher James Pollard, Royal Navy.
- Marine Engineering Mechanician (M) 1st Class Hugh Bromley Porter, D089199D.
- 24491946 Private Anthony Potter, Royal Army Ordnance Corps.
- Captain Nicholas Ernest Pounds, Royal Marines.
- Lieutenant Anthony Pringle, Royal Navy.
- Flight Lieutenant Hugh Prior 4160477, Royal Air Force.
- Lieutenant Peter Iain Mackay Rainey, Royal Navy.
- Petty Officer Air Engineering Mechanic (M) Stuart Rainsbury, D102005H.
- 24375064 Lance Corporal Barry John Randall, Corps of Royal Engineers.
- 24180996 Sergeant Peter Ratcliffe, Special Air Service Regiment.
- 24355586 Lance Corporal Graham Rennie, Scots Guards.
- Lieutenant Commander Alvin Arnold Rich, Royal Navy.
- 23942520 Warrant Officer Class 2 Malcolm Douglas Richards, Royal Regiment of Artillery.
- 24442062 Lance Corporal Julian Jon Rigg, Army Air Corps.
- Lieutenant Colonel John David Arthur Roberts (468711), Royal Army Medical Corps.
- Lieutenant Frederick William Robertson, Royal Navy.
- Leading Aircrewman Ian Robertson, D181123Y.
- Warrant Officer Class 2 Adrian Spencer Robinson, Royal Marines, P019573Y.
- Major Barnaby Peter Stuart Rolfe-Smith (486734), The Parachute Regiment.
- Captain Christopher Roy Romberg (505905), Royal Regiment of Artillery.
- Lieutenant Colonel Hugh Michael Rose O.B.E. (460818), Coldstream Guards.
- Acting Petty Officer Marine Engineering Mechanic (M) David Morgan Kerlin Ross, D149384F.
- 24098338 Sergeant Ian Roy, Corps of Royal Engineers.
- Flight Lieutenant Richard John Russell, A.F.C. 2485566, Royal Air Force.
- Sergeant Thomas Arthur Sands, Royal Marines, P027627C.
- Captain Julian David Gurney Savers (497504), Welsh Guards.
- Marine Christopher James Scrivener, Royal Marines, P039444L.
- Lieutenant (Acting Captain) Matthew Rodgers Selfridge (505347), The Parachute Regiment (Posthumous).
- Marine Engineering Mechanic (M) 1st Class David John Serrell, D148036B.
- 23251028 Warrant Officer Class 2 Michael John Sharp, Army Air Corps.
- 24128025 Corporal John William Sibley, The Parachute Regiment.
- Major Colin Stewart Sibun (482836), Army Air Corps.
- Marine Engineering Mechanician 1st Class Alan Gordon Siddle, D081197P.
- 24328940 Sapper (Acting Lance Corporal) William Austen Skinner, Corps of Royal Engineers.
- Lieutenant Robin Edgar John Sleeman, Royal Navy.
- Lieutenant David Alexander Bereton Smith, Royal Navy.
- Major Graham Frederick William Smith (479351), Royal Regiment of Artillery.
- Chief Marine Engineering Mechanic Tyrone George Smith, D060835V.
- Leading Seaman (Diver) Charles Anthony Smithard, D172151C.
- Captain Royston John Southworth (489603), Royal Army Ordnance Corps.
- Marine Engineering Mechanic (M) 1st Class Alan Stewart, D177728N.
- Chief Engineer James Mailer Stewart, Merchant Navy.
- Sergeant William John Stocks, Royal Marines, P024265U.
- Sergeant Christopher Ralph Stone, Royal Marines, P026323M.
- Marine John Stonestreet, Royal Marines, P03SS76L.
- Marine Ricky Shaun Strange, Royal Marines. P032274P.
- 24158229 Corporal of Horse Paul Stretton, The Blues and Royals (Royal Horse Guards and 1st Dragoons).
- 2nd Lieutenant James Douglas Stuart (512691), Scots Guards.
- Lieutenant William John Syms (507543), Welsh Guards.
- Marine Engineering Artificer (M) 1st Class Simon Patrick Tarabella, D121652D.
- Petty Officer Aircrewman Colin William Tattersall, D130870T.
- Commander James Bradley Taylor, Royal Navy.
- Lieutenant Nicholas Taylor, Royal Navy (Posthumous).
- Flying Officer Peter Lewis Taylor 2624527, Royal Air Force.
- 24222562 Corporal (Acting Sergeant) Robert Clive Taylor, Royal Corps of Signals.
- Commander Bryan Geoffrey Telfer, Royal Navy.
- Marine Perry Thomason, Royal Marines, P038632D.
- 23982858 Warrant Officer Class 2 Anthony John Thompson, The Devonshire and Dorset Regiment.
- Leading Seaman (Diver) Anthony Savour Thompson, D142800G.
- 24441297 Lance Corporal Paul Thompson, The Royal Regiment of Fusiliers.
- Acting Chief Weapon Engineering Mechanician Michael Gordon Till. D099091A (Posthumous)
- Major Anthony Todd (466005), Royal Corps of Transport.
- Lieutenant Christopher Todhunter, Royal Navy.
- R8086882 Corporal Alan David Tomlinson, Royal Air Force.
- 24184308 Lance Corporal Gary Tytler, Scots Guards.
- Fleet Chief Marine Engineering Artificer (P) Ernest Malcolm Uren, D069665M.
- Major Rupert Cornelius Van Der Horst, Royal Marines.
- Marine Engineering Mechanician (L) 1st Class William Geoffrey Waddington, D119620E.
- 22999484 Warrant Officer Class 2 James Walkden, B.E.M., Special Air Service Regiment.
- 24173097 Private (Acting Corporal) Peter Andrew Walker, The Staffordshire Regiment (The Prince of Wales's).
- 24309152 Sergeant Richard John Walker, Army Air Corps.
- Weapon Engineering Mechanician 2nd Class Barry James Wallis, D135931G (Posthumous).
- 2nd Lieutenant Guy Wallis (511082), The Parachute Regiment.
- Able Seaman (Diver) David Walton, D182484U.
- Lieutenant Mark Evan Waring (501715), Royal Regiment of Artillery.
- Captain James Nicholas Edward Watson (499787), Royal Regiment of Artillery.
- Lieutenant Geoffrey Ronald Weighell (507872), The Parachute Regiment.
- Captain John Frederick Wheeley (490570), Corps of Royal Engineers.
- Seaman (OPS) Douglas James Whild, D194256X.
- Lieutenant Commander Robert Ernald Wilkinson, Royal Navy.
- Lieutenant (now Captain) Mark Graham Williams (501719), Royal Regiment of Artillery.
- Captain Paul Williamson (499644), Royal Army Ordnance Corps.
- Lieutenant-Colonel John Finlay Willasey Wilsey (461522), The Devonshire and Dorset Regiment.
- Marine Paul Kevin Wilson, Royal Marines, P040423E.
- Lieutenant (now Captain) Maldwyn Stephen Henry Worsley-Tonks (501706), The Parachute Regiment.
- Sergeant Robert David Wright, Royal Marines, P027999Q.
- Flight Lieutenant Robert Dennis Wright 8021320, Royal Air Force.
- Leading Aircrewman Stephen William Wright, D1S5244K.
- Colour Sergeant Everett Young, Royal Marines, P023189T.
- Leading Medical Assistant Paul Youngman, D1S3917W.

== See also ==
- 2021 Special Honours
- 2020 Special Honours
- 2019 Special Honours
- 2018 Special Honours
- 2017 Special Honours
- 1993 Special Honours
- 1991 Special Honours
- 1974 Special Honours
- 1973 Special Honours
