= HMS Hermione (F58) =

1969 Type 12I or Leander-class frigate of the Royal Navy

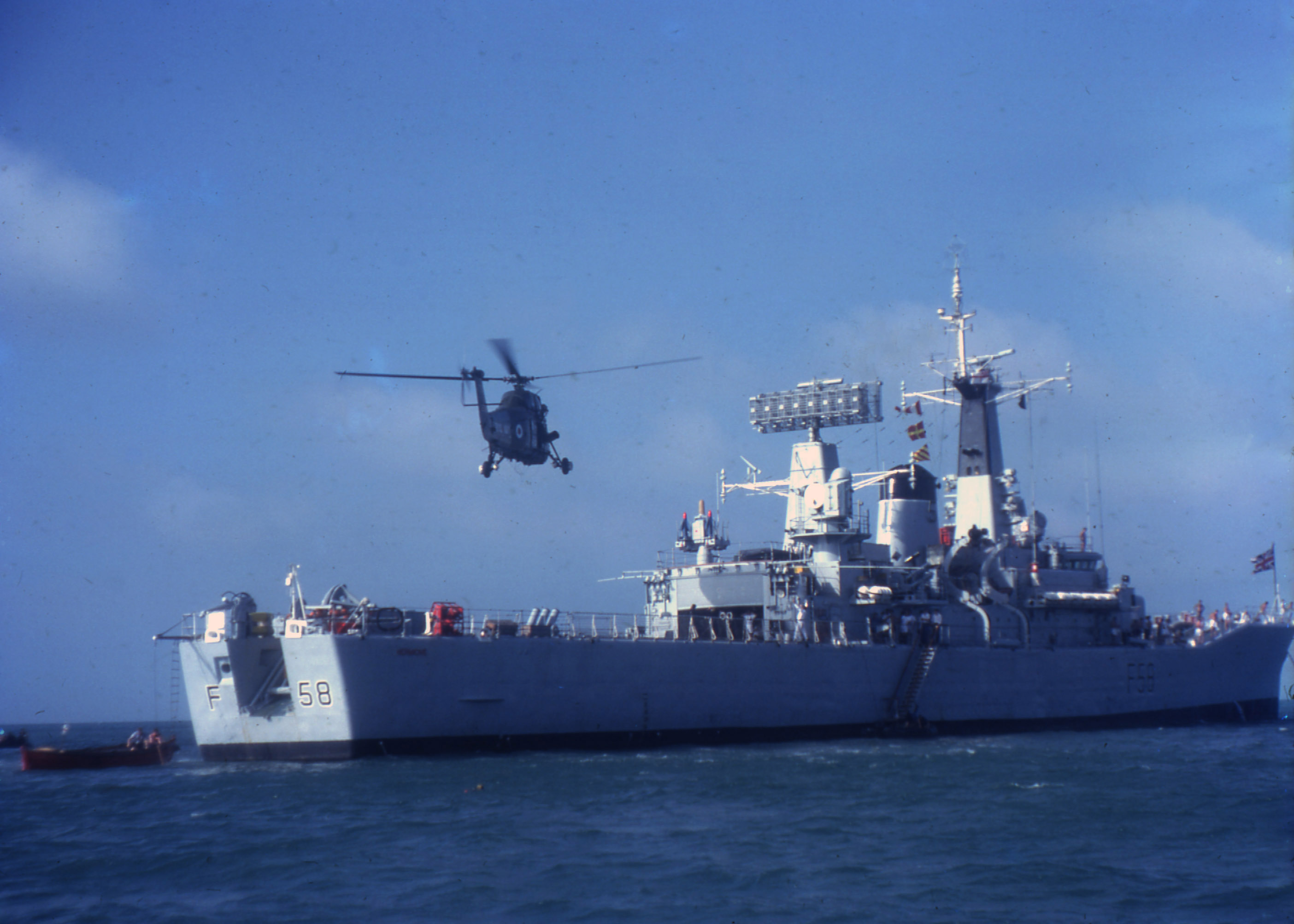
- Helicopter landing on F58 in November 1978

History

United Kingdom
- Name: HMS Hermione (F58)
- Operator: Royal Navy
- Builder: Alexander Stephens and Son, Govan, Glasgow
- Laid down: 6 December 1965
- Launched: 26 April 1967
- Commissioned: 11 July 1969
- Decommissioned: 30 June 1992
- Fate: Sold for scrap, 1997

General characteristics
- Class & type: Leander-class frigate
- Aircraft carried: 1 × Westland Wasp or Westland Lynx

HMS Hermione (F58) was a Leander-class frigate of the Royal Navy (RN). She was, like the rest of her class, named after a figure of mythology. Hermione was built by Alexander Stephen and Sons, though she was completed by Yarrow Shipbuilders. She was launched on 26 April 1967 and commissioned on 11 July 1969.

== Operational service ==
In 1970, Hermione deployed to the Far East and Pacific visiting a variety of places and performing a number of duties. Hermione became quite used to such warm climates during the 1970s. In 1977 Hermione, as leader of the 5th Frigate Squadron, took part in the Fleet Review of the Royal Navy, in celebration of HM the Queen's Silver Jubilee.

In January 1980, Hermione began her modernisation programme, which included the addition of the Sea Wolf missile and the Exocet anti-ship missile, which forced the removal of Hermione's twin 4.5 in guns. The modernisation was completed in 1983 at Chatham Naval Dockyard, and Hermione was the last ship to leave when the dockyard closed. Upon the completion of her modernisation, Hermione joined the 8th Frigate Squadron. Hermione saw service in the Middle East, also being involved in the so-called 'Tanker War' during the Iran–Iraq War. In 1991, Hermione returned to the Middle East on an Armilla Patrol deployment, but in the following year Hermione was decommissioned and in 1997 she was sold to India for scrap.

The ship also enjoyed fame on BBC TV, through starring as "HMS Hero" in the acclaimed drama series Warship. All members of the crew were given "HMS Hero" cap tallies for filming purposes. The main ship used for filming was, however, HMS Phoebe.

== Notable commanders ==
Notable commanders of the ship include Robert Squires (1971), Peter Stanford (1974–75) and John McAnally (1989).

== Publications ==
- Colledge, J. J.; Warlow, Ben (2006) [1969]. Ships of the Royal Navy: The Complete Record of All Fighting Ships of the Royal Navy from the 15th Century to the Present (3rd Rev ed.). London: Chatham Publishing. ISBN 978-1-86176-281-8. OCLC 67375475.
- Marriott, Leo, 1983. Royal Navy Frigates 1945-1983, Ian Allan Ltd, Surrey.
