= HMS Fowey =

Seven ships of the Royal Navy have borne the name HMS Fowey, either after the Cornish town of Fowey, or the River Fowey which runs through it, whilst another two were planned:

- HMS Fowey (1696) was a 32-gun fifth rate launched in 1696 and captured by the French in 1704.
- HMS Fowey (1705) was a 32-gun fifth rate launched in 1705 and captured by the French in 1709.
- HMS Fowey (1709) was a 44-gun fifth rate launched in 1709. She was renamed HMS Queenborough in 1744 and was broken up in 1746.
- HMS Fowey (1744) was a 44-gun fifth rate launched in 1744 and wrecked in 1748.
- HMS Fowey (1749) was a 24-gun sixth rate launched in 1749 and sunk in 1781.
- HMS Fowey (1795) was a 3-gun gunvessel, originally an ex-barge purchased in 1795 and sold on 29 December 1801 for £160.
- HMS Fowey was a planned Hunt-class minesweeper. She was renamed HMS Forres in before being launched in 1918.
- HMS Fowey (L15) was a Shoreham-class sloop launched in 1930 and sold in 1946.
- HMS Fowey was laid down as a Rothesay-class frigate. This hull was ultimately cancelled and reordered as the Leander-class frigate HMS Ajax.

== See also ==
- HM Hired armed cutter Fowey, which served the Royal Navy between 1799 and 1800.
