= HMS Andromeda (F57) =

Type 12I or Leander-class frigate of the Royal Navy and Indian Navy

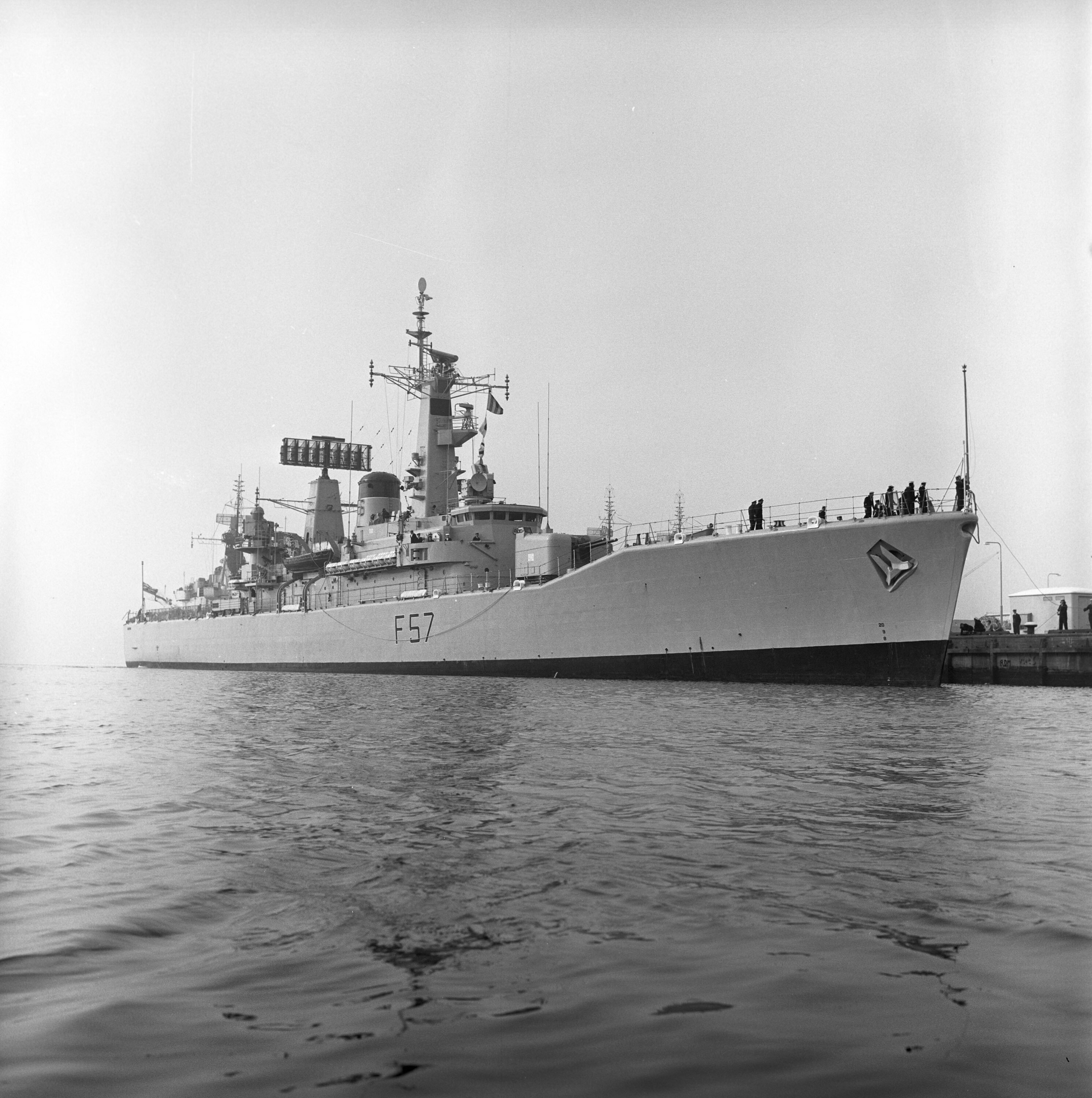
- HMS Andromeda (F57) in 1972

History

United Kingdom
- Name: HMS Andromeda
- Builder: HMNB Portsmouth
- Laid down: 25 May 1966
- Launched: 24 May 1967
- Sponsored by: Mrs G Reynolds
- Commissioned: 2 December 1968
- Decommissioned: June 1993
- Identification: Pennant number: 57
- Nickname(s): "Heinz Variety"
- Fate: Sold to India, 1995

India
- Name: INS Krishna
- Namesake: Krishna River
- Commissioned: 22 August 1995
- Decommissioned: 24 May 2012
- Identification: Pennant number: F46
- Fate: Sunk as a target, 2012

General characteristics
- Class & type: Leander-class frigate
- Displacement: 3,200 long tons (3,251 t) full load
- Length: 113.4 m (372 ft)
- Beam: 12.5 m (41 ft)
- Draught: 5.8 m (19 ft)
- Propulsion: 2 × Babcock & Wilcox boilers supplying steam to two sets of White-English Electric double-reduction geared turbines to two shafts
- Speed: 28 knots (52 km/h)
- Range: 4,600 nautical miles (8,500 km) at 15 knots (28 km/h)
- Complement: 223
- Armament: As built: 1 × twin 4.5 inch (114 mm) guns; 1 × quadruple Sea Cat anti-aircraft missile launchers; 1 × Limbo anti-submarine mortar; From 1980: 4 × Exocet anti-ship missile launchers; 1 × GWS 25 Sea Wolf anti-aircraft missile launcher; 2 × single 40 mm Bofors anti-aircraft guns; 2 × triple torpedo tubes
- Aircraft carried: 1 × Westland Wasp helicopter; From 1980: 1 × Lynx helicopter

HMS Andromeda was a Leander-class frigate of the Royal Navy. She was built at HM Dockyard Portsmouth. She was launched on 24 May 1967 and commissioned into the Royal Navy on 2 December 1968. She took part in the Falklands War. She was sold to India in 1995, for use as a training ship, and renamed INS Krishna. She was finally decommissioned in May 2012.

== Construction ==
Andromeda was one of three Leander-class frigates ordered on 12 January 1965, the other two being Hermione and Jupiter. She was laid down at HMNB Portsmouth on 25 May 1966, launched on 24 May 1967 and commissioned on 2 December 1968 with the Pennant number F57.

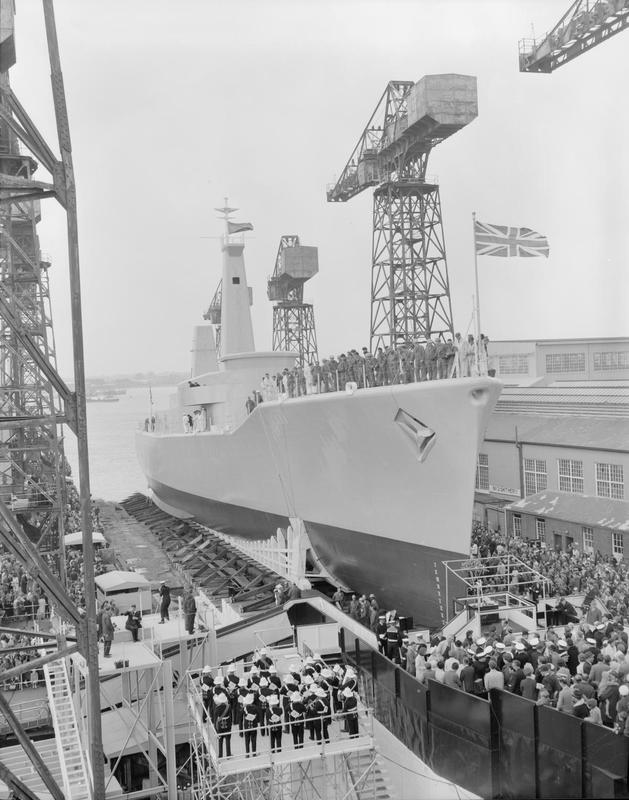
HMS Andromeda being launched at Portsmouth Royal Dockyard, May 1967.

Andromeda was a Batch 3, "Broad-Beamed" Leander, and as such was 372 feet (113.4 m) long overall and 360 feet (109.7 m) at the waterline, with a beam of 43 feet (13.1 m) and a maximum draught of 19 feet (5.8 m). Displacement was 2,500 long tons (2,500 t) standard and 2,962 long tons (3,010 t) full load. Two oil-fired boilers fed steam at 550 pounds per square inch (3,800 kPa) and 850 °F (454 °C) to a pair of double reduction geared steam turbines that in turn drove two propeller shafts, with the machinery rated at 30,000 shaft horsepower (22,000 kW), giving a speed of 28 knots (52 km/h; 32 mph).

A twin 4.5-inch (113 mm) Mark 6 gun mount was fitted forward. A single Sea Cat surface-to-air missile launcher was fitted aft (on the Helicopter hangar roof), while two Oerlikon 20mm cannon provided close-in defence. A Limbo anti-submarine mortar was fitted aft to provide a short-range anti-submarine capability, while a hangar and helicopter deck allowed a single Westland Wasp helicopter to be operated, for longer range anti-submarine and anti-surface operations.

As built, Andromeda was fitted with a large Type 965 long range air search radar on the ship's mainmast, with a Type 993 short range air/surface target indicating radar and Type 978 navigation radar carried on the ship's foremast. An MRS3 fire control system was carried to direct the 4.5-inch guns. The ship had a sonar suite of Type 184 medium range search sonar, Type 162 bottom search and Type 170 attack sonar, together with a Type 199 variable depth sonar (VDS). (Note: The VDS was later removed and its well plated over.)

Between 1977 and 1980, Andromeda underwent a major reconstruction, in which the ship's armament and sensors were greatly revised. The 4.5 inch gun turret, Sea Cat launcher and Limbo anti submarine mortar were removed, with a sextuple Sea Wolf surface-to-air missile launcher and four Exocet missiles fitted forward. Two triple STWS-1 324-millimetre (12.8 in) torpedo tubes allowed anti-submarine torpedoes to be launched, while the ship's hangar and flight deck were enlarged to allow a Westland Lynx helicopter to be carried instead of the smaller Wasp. A completely new radar outfit was fitted, with a Type 967 air-search radar and a Type 968 low-level air warning and surface search radar fitted back to back on the ship's foremast, and with a Type 1006 navigation radar fitted lower down on the ship's foremast. A Type 2016 long-range search sonar replaced the Type 184 sonar, while the Type 162 bottom search sonar was retained. Displacement increased to 2,790 long tons (2,830 t) standard and 3,300 long tons (3,400 t) full load, while speed dropped to 25 knots (46 km/h; 29 mph).

== Royal Navy Service ==
=== Beira Patrol ===
In 1969, Andromeda was deployed to the Persian Gulf and Far East as leader of the 2nd Destroyer Flotilla, taking part in the Beira Patrol, a deployment that was used to prevent oil reaching Rhodesia via Mozambique. On 1 June 1970, the Royal Fleet Auxiliary tanker RFA Ennerdale, on her way to refuel Andromeda, struck an uncharted pinnacle of rock off the Seychelles, and sank. Andromeda was the first ship on the scene of the accident, and helped to rescue the crew of Ennerdale, the wreck of which was later destroyed by explosives. Later that year, Andromeda returned to European waters. On 23 October 1970, the Liberian-flagged tanker Pacific Glory collided with the tanker Allegro off the Isle of Wight and caught fire with 13 killed aboard Pacific Glory. The blazing Pacific Glory ran aground on 24 October, and Andromeda took part in the large scale clean up operation. On 9 October 1970, Andromeda and her helicopter went to the aid of the tug RMAS Samsonia which had suffered a mechanical breakdown when towing the landing ship Stalker in bad weather through the Pentland Firth. In 1971 she was present at Portsmouth Navy Days. In August 1971 she joined the 6th Frigate Squadron as leader.

=== Cod Wars ===
In 1973, Andromeda took part in the Second Cod War, patrolling to intervene in case of interference on British fishing by Icelandic vessels. On 11 August 1973, Andromeda was rammed by the Icelandic gunboat Óðinn. The following year, Andromeda had to evacuate British civilians from the Mediterranean island of Cyprus after Turkey had invaded it. In 1975, during the Third Cod War, the Icelandic gunboat Týr rammed Andromeda on 28 December, damaging her guardrail and a chaff launcher. On 7 January 1976, Andromeda was involved in another ramming, this time with the gunboat Þór. Both warships were damaged, with Andromeda receiving a 12 feet (3.7 m) dent as a result of this collision, and had to return to Devonport for repairs.

=== Falklands War ===
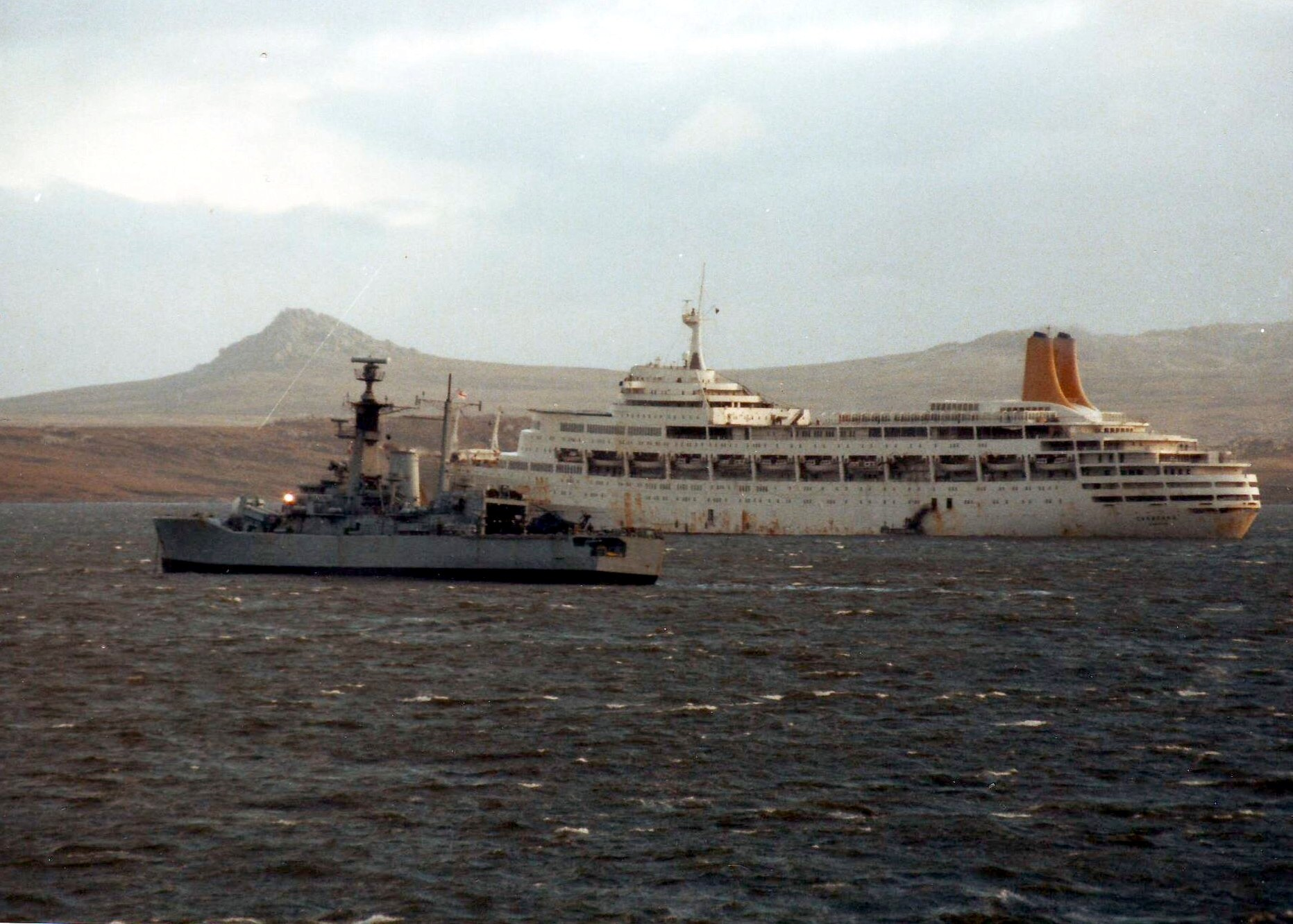
Andromeda alongside SS Canberra at the end of the Falklands War

In 1977, Andromeda took part in the Fleet Review of the Royal Navy, during the Silver Jubilee celebrations for Queen Elizabeth II. Between November 1977 and December 1980, Andromeda underwent modernisation, including the addition of Exocet and Sea Wolf missiles at Devonport dockyard. Andromeda took part in the Falklands War in 1982, returning to the United Kingdom from a deployment in the Western Atlantic in April 1982, before sailing for the South Atlantic as part of the 'Bristol Group', entering the Total Exclusion Zone on 25 May. She mainly acted as a close-escort for the aircraft carrier Invincible, receiving no damage during the war. After visiting South Georgia in August, she sailed for home, reaching Devonport on 10 September.

=== Varied duties ===
In the subsequent years of the 1980s, Andromeda performed a number of varied duties, patrolling the Persian Gulf on Armilla Patrol, and deployments to the Falklands and West Indies. In late summer of 1984, Andromeda docked at Baltimore Harbor in the US for 10 days, on her way from the Falklands back home to England. Armilla deployment 1983. Ports visited included Djibouti, Cochin, Singapore, Mombasa, Mauritius, Reunion and the Maldives Falklands 1984 Armilla deployment 1985. Ports visited included Muscat, Seychelles Sharjah, Mombasa and Gibraltar.

== Sale ==
Between 1990 and 1991, Andromeda underwent a refit. She was decommissioned two-years later. Andromeda was sold to the Indian Navy in 1995, where she was commissioned as the training ship, INS Krishna. Her armament had been reduced to two Bofors 40 mm guns and two Oerlikon 20 mm cannons.

== Fate ==
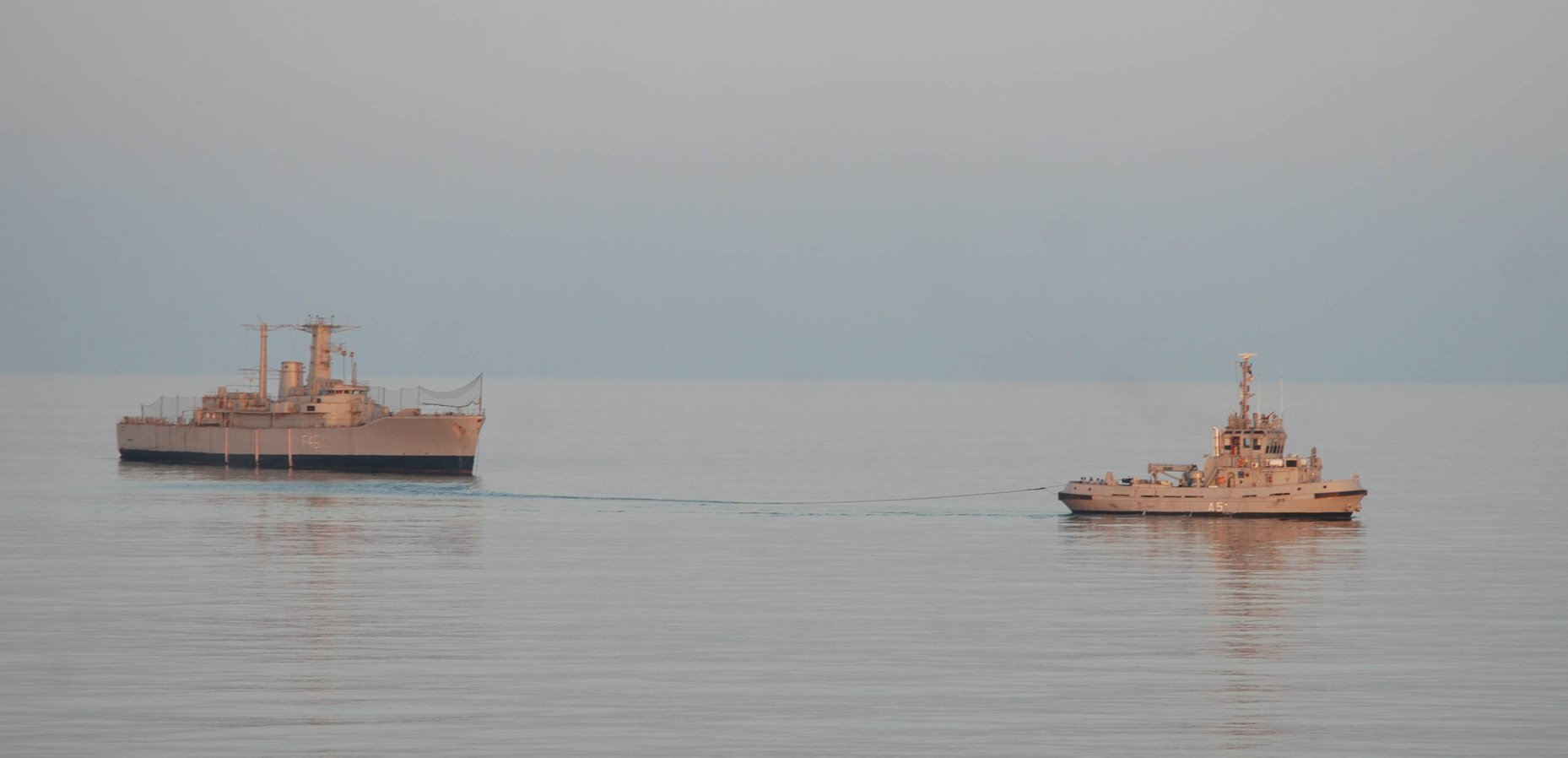
INS Krishna under tow following her retirement

Krishna was decommissioned on 24 May 2012 at Mumbai, 44 years to the day after her launch. The ship was sunk in the Bay of Bengal for target practice by Indian Navy ships later in 2012.

== Commanding officers ==
| From | To | Captain |
|---|---|---|
| 1968 | 1970 | Captain Michael L Stacey |
| 1970 | 1971 | Captain David T Smith |
| 1971 | 1972 | Captain Richard D Franklin |
| 1972 | 1974 | Captain Alexander F R Weir |
| 1974 | 1976 | Captain Robert Gerken |
| 1976 | 1977 | Captain Anthony M G Pearson |
| 1977 | 1977 | Captain Kelvin A Low |
| 1980 | 1982 | Commander J A A McCoy |
| 1982 | 1984 | Captain James Weatherall |
| 1984 | 1985 | Captain Michael A C Moore |
| 1985 | 1987 | Captain Jeremy Sanders |
| 1987 | 1988 | Captain Neil E Rankin |
| 1988 | 1989 | Commander Charles Style RN |

== Publications ==
- Blackman, Raymond V. B., ed. (1971). Jane's Fighting Ships 1971–72. London: Sampson Low Marston & Co., Ltd. ISBN 0-354-00096-9.
- Burden, Rodney A.; Draper, Michael I.; Rough, Douglas A.; Smith, Colin R.; Wilton, David (1986). Falklands: The Air War. British Aviation Research Group. ISBN 0-906339-05-7.
- Colledge, J. J.; Warlow, Ben (2006) [1969]. Ships of the Royal Navy: The Complete Record of All Fighting Ships of the Royal Navy from the 15th Century to the Present (3rd Rev ed.). London: Chatham Publishing. ISBN 978-1-86176-281-8. OCLC 67375475.
- Critchley, Mike (1992). British Warships Since 1945: Part 5: Frigates. Liskeard, UK: Maritime Press. ISBN 0-907771-13-0.
- Friedman, Norman (2008). British Destroyers & Frigates: The Second World War and After. Barnsley, UK: Seaforth Publishing. ISBN 978-1-84832-015-4.
- Marriott, Leo (1983). Royal Navy Frigates 1945–1983. Shepperton, Surrey, UK: Ian Allan Ltd. ISBN 0-7110-1322-5.
- Osborne, Richard; Sowdon, David (1990). Leander Class Frigates. Kendal, UK: World Ships Society. ISBN 0-905617-56-8.
- Prézelin, Bernard; A.D. Baker III, eds. (1990). The Naval Institute Guide to Combat Fleets of the World 1990/1991. Annapolis, Maryland, USA: Naval Institute Press. ISBN 0-87021-250-8.
