= HMS Ajax (F114) =

1963 Type 12I or Leander-class frigate of the Royal Navy

- HMS Ajax underway

History

United Kingdom
- Name: HMS Ajax
- Builder: Cammell Laird
- Laid down: 12 October 1959
- Launched: 16 August 1962
- Commissioned: 10 December 1963
- Decommissioned: 31 May 1985
- Identification: Pennant number: F114
- Nickname(s): White tornado
- Fate: Scrapped 1988
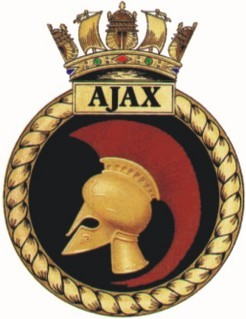
- Badge

General characteristics
- Class & type: Leander-class frigate
- Displacement: 2,450 tons standard; 2,860 tons full load
- Length: 372 ft (113 m)
- Beam: 41 ft (12 m)
- Draught: 18 ft (5 m)
- Propulsion: 2 × Babcock & Wilcox 550psi boilers; 2 × English Electric steam turbines
- Speed: 30 knots (56 km/h; 35 mph)
- Range: 5,300 nmi (9,800 km; 6,100 mi) at 12 knots (22 km/h; 14 mph)
- Complement: 251 as built, 257 after Ikara refit
- Armament: As built: 2 × Vickers 4.5 in (114 mm) gun in Mk6 turret (1 × 2); 2 × 40 mm Bofors guns (2 × 1); 1 × Mk10 Limbo anti-submarine mortar; After Ikara refit: 2 × 40 mm Bofors guns (2 × 1); 1 × Mk10 Limbo AS mortar; 1 × Ikara AS rocket; 8 × GWS22 Sea Cat (2 × 4)
- Aircraft carried: 1 × Wasp helicopter

HMS Ajax was a Leander-class frigate of the Royal Navy. She was built by the famous Cammell Laird company of Birkenhead. Ajax was launched on 16 August 1962 and commissioned on 10 December 1963. She was originally intended to be named HMS Fowey, and laid down as a Rothesay class, but instead became part of Batch 1 of the Leander class.

== Construction ==
Ajax was built by Cammell Laird of Birkenhead. She was laid down, with the yard number 1285, as a Rothesay-class frigate to be called Fowey on 19 October 1959, but in 1960 it was decided to complete the ship as one of the new Leander class, with the new name Ajax. Ajax was launched on 16 August 1962 and was commissioned on 11 December 1963. Total construction cost was £4,800,000

The ship was 372 feet (113.4 m) long overall and 360 feet (109.7 m) at the waterline, with a beam of 41 feet (12.5 m) and a maximum draught of 18 feet (5.5 m). Displacement was 2,380 long tons (2,420 t) standard and 2,860 long tons (2,910 t) full load. Two oil-fired boilers fed steam at 550 pounds per square inch (3,800 kPa) and 850 °F (454 °C) to a pair of double reduction geared steam turbines that in turn drove two propeller shafts, with the machinery rated at 30,000 shaft horsepower (22,000 kW), giving a speed of 28 knots (52 km/h; 32 mph).

A twin 4.5-inch (114 mm) Mark 6 gun mount was fitted forward. While the Leander class was planned to be fitted with the Sea Cat surface-to-air missile, Ajax was completed with two Bofors 40 mm anti-aircraft guns as a temporary substitute until Sea Cat could be fitted. A Limbo anti-submarine mortar was fitted aft to provide a short-range anti-submarine capability, while a hangar and helicopter deck allowed a single Westland Wasp helicopter to be operated, for longer range anti-submarine and anti-surface operations.

As built, Ajax was fitted with a large Type 965 long range air search radar on the ship's mainmast, with a Type 993 short range air/surface target indicating radar and Type 974 navigation radar carried on the ship's foremast. An MRS3 fire control system was carried to direct the 4.5-inch guns. The ship had a sonar suite of Type 177 medium range search sonar, Type 162 bottom search and Type 170 attack sonar, while the ship was designed to carry a Type 199 variable depth sonar (VDS), this was not installed on Ajax.

== Service history ==
In early 1964 Ajax assisted the Swedish MV Solklint after it collided with the Cissoula in the English Channel. Later in 1964, Ajax was deployed to the Far East, becoming the leader of the 24th Escort Group. It was a long deployment, and she did not return to the UK until 1968. Activities included taking part in the Beira Patrol, covering the withdrawal of British forces from operations off Aden, and acting as guardship for Hong Kong. In 1970, Ajax became the Gibraltar guard ship, a required deployment at that time due to the tense fears of invasion by General Franco.

In September 1970, Ajax began a modernisation at Devonport Dockyard that lasted until 1973, having her 4.5-inch gun turret replaced by an Ikara anti-submarine missile system. A pair of quadruple GWS22 SeaCat launchers were fitted aft while the two Bofors guns were retained but moved forward to abreast the ship's mainmast. The Limbo anti-submarine mortar and Wasp helicopter were retained. The long-range Type 965 radar was removed, with improved navigation and target indicating radars fitted, and the ADAWS 5 computer-aided combat direction system added to direct Ikara operations, while the Type 199 VDS was restored.

Following her conversion she became leader of the 8th Frigate Squadron. In 1974, she assisted in the evacuation of British citizens after the Turkish invasion of Cyprus. In 1976, while on a visit to Canada, Ajax visited the town of Ajax, Ontario, which had been named in honour of her predecessor, the Leander-class cruiser Ajax made famous by the Battle of the River Plate during the Second World War. The 'new' Ajax was granted the freedom of the city.

In 1977, Ajax underwent a refit at Devonport Dockyard, deploying in 1979 to the Mediterranean. In 1980, she underwent a refit at Gibraltar which was completed in 1981. That year, Ajax became the leader of the 1st Frigate Squadron. She did not take part in the 1982 Falklands War, but was deployed as Persian Gulf guard ship; she later completed a four-month deployment around the Falklands as part of the South Atlantic Protection Force in 1984. She participated in further deployments that culminated in the highlight of her final year in 1985 when she escorted HMY Britannia, which took a number of the Royal Family on a tour of Italy.

== Fate ==
She was decommissioned 31 May 1985, then replaced HMS Salisbury as a static training ship at Devonport. On 3 August 1988, Ajax arrived at Millom, Cumbria to be broken up.

Her anchor is now located at the local Royal Canadian Legion Branch (Hunt Street) and bell hangs in the Ajax Town Council Chamber in Ajax, Ontario. One of her radio masts can be seen at Millom RUFC, Wilson Park, Haverigg where it acts as the flagpole near the entrance to the car park.

== Commanding officers ==
From	To	Captain
1963	1965	Captain The Hon D P Seely RN
1965	1966	Captain Gordon Tait DSC RN
1966	1968	Captain George A de G Kitchin RN
1968	1969	Captain David Hepworth RN
1969	1970	Captain Harry R Keate RN
1970	1973	Refit (Ikara Conversion)
1973	1974	Captain Richard J Bates RN
1974	1976	Captain David J MacKenzie RN
1976	1977	Captain Robert Squires RN
1977	1978	Captain Peter Cobb RN
1978	1980	Captain M J F Rawlinson RN
1980	1981	Captain Timothy M. Bevan RN
1981	1983	Captain Jeremy Michael Porter RN
1983	1984	Captain Peter Abbott RN
1984	1985	Captain John F S Trinder RN

== Publications ==
- Colledge, J. J.; Warlow, Ben (2006) [1969]. Ships of the Royal Navy: The Complete Record of All Fighting Ships of the Royal Navy from the 15th Century to the Present (3rd Rev ed.). London: Chatham Publishing. ISBN 978-1-86176-281-8. OCLC 67375475.
- Critchley, Mike (1986). British Warships Since 1945: Part 5 Frigates. Liskeard, UK: Maritime Books. ISBN 0-907771-13-0.
- Marriott, Leo (1983). Royal Navy Frigates 1945–1983. Shepperton, Surrey, UK: Ian Allan. ISBN 0-7110-1322-5.
- Osborne, Richard; Sowdon, David (1990). Leander Class Frigates. Kendal, UK: World Ships Society. ISBN 0-905617-56-8.
