= 8th Frigate Squadron =

- Active: June 1973 – 1993
- Country: United Kingdom
- Branch: Royal Navy
- Size: Squadron

Commanders
- First: Captain Richard J. Bates
- Last: Captain David A.J. Blackburn

The 8th Frigate Squadron was an administrative unit of the Royal Navy from 1973 to 1993.

== Operational history ==
During its existence, the squadron included Rothesay-class, Leander-class and Type 22 frigates. Ships from the squadron participated in the Cod Wars, the Silver Jubilee Fleet Review, the Falklands War, the Armilla Patrol, and as part of STANAVFORLANT. The squadron was disbanded as part of the Royal Navy's reorganization in the mid-1990s.

== Squadron commander ==
Commander	Ship	Dates
Captain Richard J. Bates	HMS Ajax	June 1973-December 1974
Captain David J. Mackenzie	HMS Ajax	December 1974-July 1976
Captain Robert R. Squires	HMS Ajax	July 1976-March 1977
Captain Peter Cobb	HMS Ajax	March 1977-December 1978
Captain Michael J.F. Rawlinson	HMS Ajax	December 1978-July 1980
Captain Timothy M. Bevan	HMS Ajax/HMS Ariadne	July 1980-April 1982
Captain James L. Weatherall	HMS Andromeda	April 1982-February 1984
Captain Michael A.C. Moore	HMS Andromeda	February 1984-September 1985
Captain Jeremy T. Sanders	HMS Andromeda	September 1985-March 1987
Captain Neil E. Rankin	HMS Andromeda	March 1987 – 1988
Captain Christopher L. Wreford-Brown	HMS Cornwall	1988-January 1989
Captain Richard T.R. Phillips	HMS Cornwall	January 1989 – 1990
Captain Paul Branscombe	HMS Cornwall	1990-1992
Captain David A.J. Blackburn	HMS Cornwall	1992-1993

== See also ==
- List of squadrons and flotillas of the Royal Navy
