= Robert Squires =

Royal Navy admiral (1927–2016)

Vice-Admiral Robert Squires DL
- Born: 11 February 1927
- Died: 30 June 2016 (aged 89)
- Military career
- Allegiance: United Kingdom
- Branch: Royal Navy
- Rank: Vice-Admiral
- Commands: HMS Hermione; HMS Bristol; 8th Frigate Squadron; First Flotilla; Submarines; Scotland and Northern Ireland

Vice-Admiral Robert Risley Squires DL (11 February 1927 – 30 June 2016) was a Royal Navy officer who became Flag Officer, Scotland and Northern Ireland.

== Naval career ==
Squires joined the Royal Navy as a sub-lieutenant in 1946. He was given command of the frigate HMS Hermione in 1971 and of the destroyer HMS Bristol in 1975. He went on to be Commanding Officer of the frigate HMS Ajax as well as Captain of the 8th Frigate Squadron in 1976, Flag Officer First Flotilla in 1977 and Flag Officer Submarines in 1978. Promoted to vice admiral on 2 May 1980, he became Flag Officer, Scotland and Northern Ireland in 1982 before retiring in 1983.

He lived at Seaview, Isle of Wight, and became Deputy Lieutenant of the Isle of Wight. He died on 30 June 2016 at the age of 89.

== Family ==
He was married to Sue.

Military offices
Preceded by John Fieldhouse	Flag Officer Submarines; 1978–1981	Succeeded by Sir Peter Herbert
Preceded by Sir Thomas Baird	Flag Officer, Scotland and Northern Ireland; 1982–1983	Succeeded by Sir Nicholas Hunt
