= Lissa Solklint =

Dutch built Australian ship

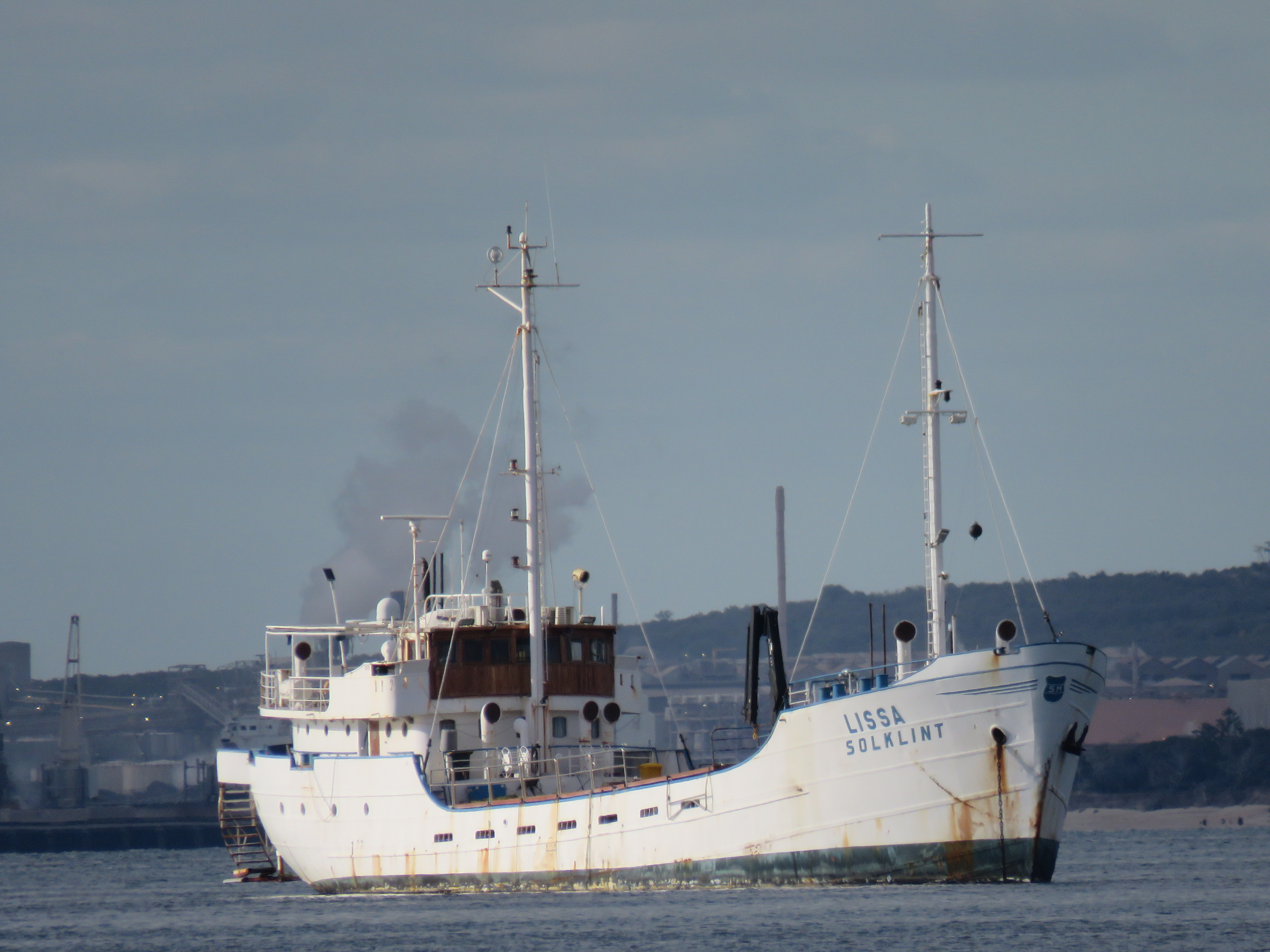
- Lissa Solklint in Mangles Bay, May 2021.

History

Sweden
- Name: Solklint
- Owner: Sven J. Mattsson
- Builder: Ferus Smit, Royal Niestern Sander
- Yard number: 120
- Launched: 17 December 1955
- In service: May 1956
- Renamed: Nea

Cook Islands
- Name: Lissa
- Owner: Chris Packer and Eric Meier
- Port of registry: Avatiu
- In service: February 2002

Australia
- Name: Lissa
- Owner: Mack McCormack
- Operator: Lissa Pty. Ltd.
- Port of registry: Fremantle
- In service: November 2006
- Renamed: Lissa Solklint
- Identification: IMO number: 5333567

General characteristics
- Type: General cargo ship
- Tonnage: 494 GRT
- Length: 53.09 m (174 ft 2 in)
- Beam: 8.41 m (27 ft 7 in)
- Draft: 3.21 m (10 ft 6 in)
- Depth of hold: 891 cbm (grain)
- Propulsion: Alpha-Diesel A/S, 2SA 5 cyl (260 x 400), 500 bhp (370 kW)
- Speed: 9.5 knots (17.6 km/h; 10.9 mph)

MV Lissa Solklint (originally named Solklint, and then Nea, and finally Lissa) is a general cargo ship built in the Netherlands and converted into a private yacht currently residing in Western Australia. The vessel is most notable for being wrongfully suspected of arms smuggling by Indonesian police.

== History ==
Launched on 17 December 1955 in Foxhol with the hull constructed by Scheepswerf Ferus Smit (Smit & Zoon) and completed by Royal Niestern Sander in Delfzijl entering service in May 1955 for Sven J. Mattsson of Slite, with the vessel being named by Mattsson's godmother Linnea and loosely translates to "Sunflower", it had a relatively uneventful life under Swedish ownership during which it carried cargo from Gotland to mainland Sweden as well as serving multiple other routes in the Baltic Sea.

On 25 February 1964 the vessel collided with the Panamanian steam tramper Cissoula in the English Channel being badly damaged, the crew were rescued by the transatlantic MV Hallaren. The Solklint was able to return to Cherbourg with assistance from HMS Ajax.

In June 1976 it was transferred to Mattsson's new company Rederi AB Solklint founded the year prior who promptly sold 50% ownership off to CEO of Gotlandsbolaget, Eric D. Nilsson of Visby in November 1977 for 450,000 kr, it was renamed Nea, Mattsson's nickname for his wife, so the name Solklint could be applied to its replacement. Nea's replacement effectively, built in 1978 bankrupt Rederi AB Solklint which was forced into liquidation so in June 1979 it was sold to Rolf H. E. Pettersson of Skärholmen for 800,000 kr who renamed it Lissa after Pettersson's eldest daughter, the ship entered service on 18 October 1979 in Kalmar being chartered for general cargo by Löfstrand & Brown. In March 1992 Rolf H. E. Pettersson became the sole owner of Lissa when his father Herbert died, the ship was now chartered by Bröderna Höglund until 1999 when Pettersson sold it to Australian multimillionaire Chris Packer and oilrig worker Eric Meier in 2000 for 1.7 million kr upon which it was refitted in Klaipėda, Lithuania.

In February 2002 it was registered to the Cook Islands with Lissa first arriving in Australia in November 2004 at Sydney. Packer met his future partner, Gianna Botto while sailing with Lissa near Peru, it was also here that Packer was robbed by pirates. In 2004 Packer was arrested by Indonesian authorities after finding undeclared weapons aboard Lissa which was detained at Benoa, initially Packer was suspected of illicit arms trafficking which carries the death sentence in Indonesia, however he was cleared of these charges in a Denpasar court and given a reduced sentence of 3 months in Kerobokan Prison for not declaring he had weapons aboard Lissa - which was a customs violation, the weapons were actually for use as self-defense against piracy while Lissa was en route from Malaysia.

Following health problems stemming from a heart attack in April, Lissa was sold by Packer to former Special Air Service sergeant Mack McCormack in November 2006. who founded the private company Lissa Pty Ltd on 15 November in 2006.

McCormack renamed the vessel in June 2009 to the Lissa Solklint and sailed it to East Timor in 2010 providing humanitarian aid, when it returned to Australian waters while en route to Fremantle Lissa Solklint was forced to be towed to Exmouth after breaking-down due to the blower failing near Ningaloo reef.

The Lissa Solklint was also briefly listed as a training ship under McCormack's company Saferight as a training vessel, for which the cargo hold was outfitted with air-conditioned classrooms and the 8-tonne crane to be used for launching and recovering smaller tenders. Since around 2014 the Lissa Solklint has been anchored in Mangles Bay and can be seen from Rockingham foreshore. It is considered a pleasure craft by the Seafarers Safety, Rehabilitation and Compensation Authority.

== Gallery ==
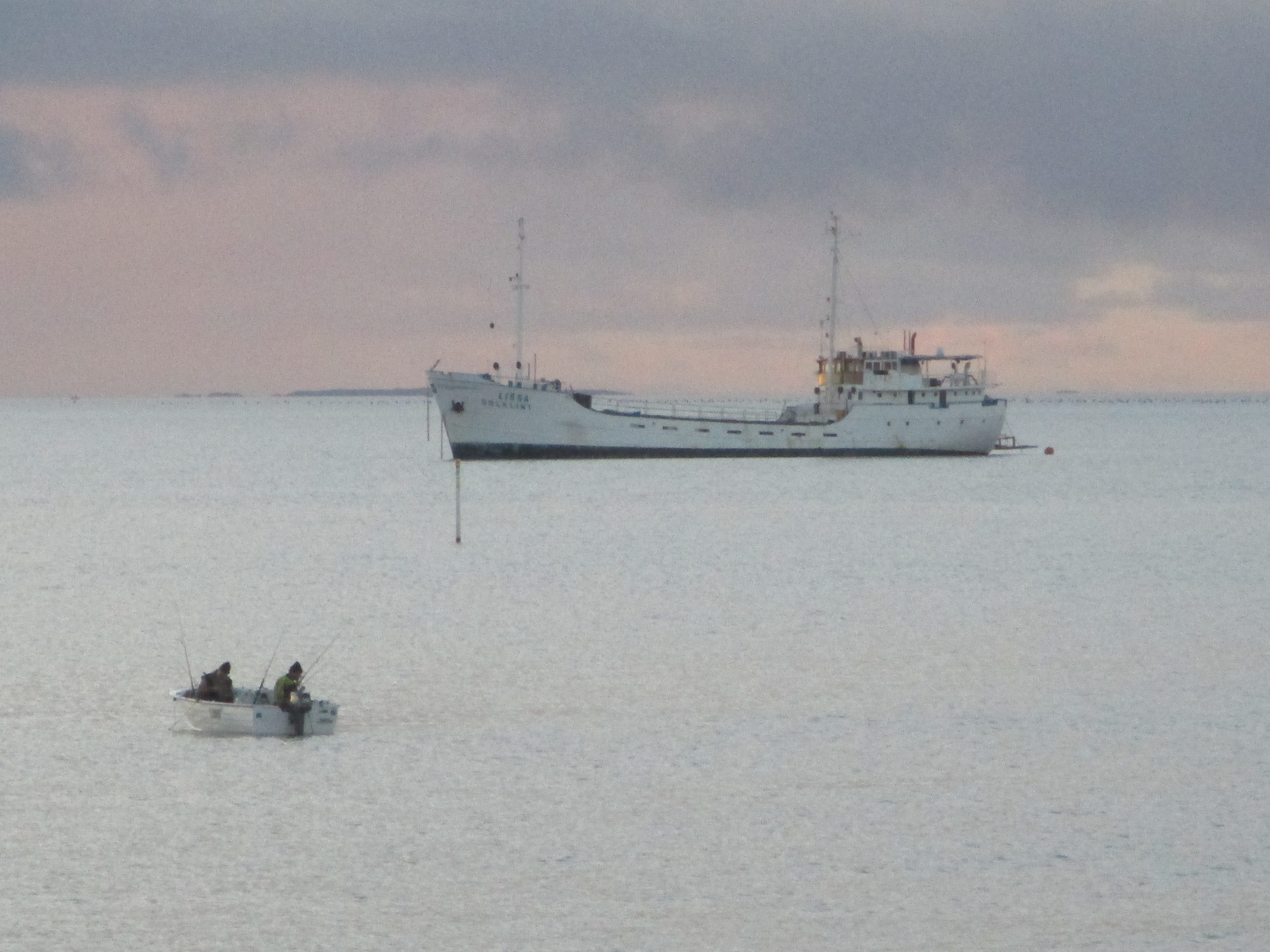
Lissa Solklint in Mangles Bay, July 2019.

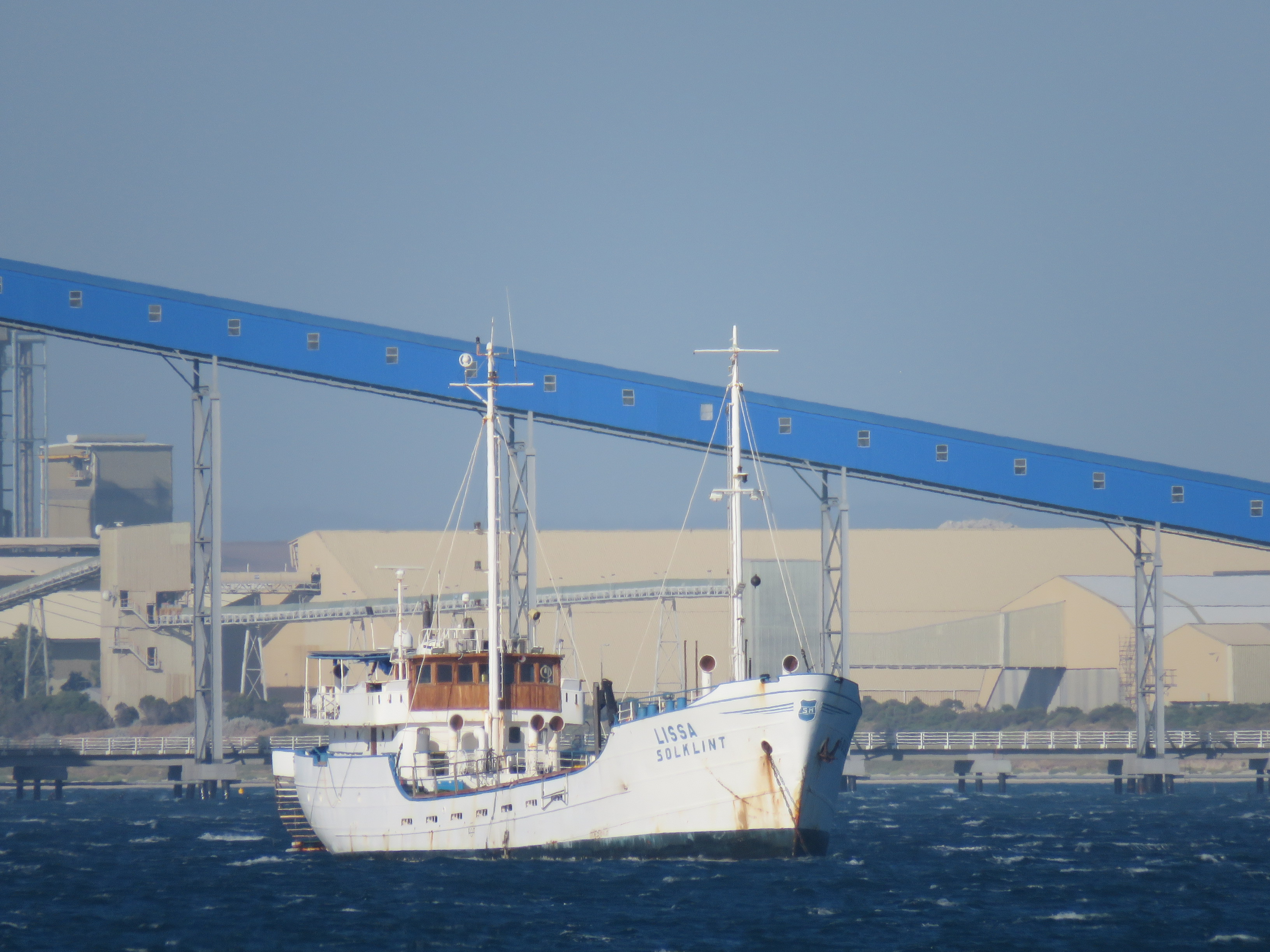
Lissa Solklint in Mangles Bay, December 2020 with CBH Kwinana Grain Terminal in the background.

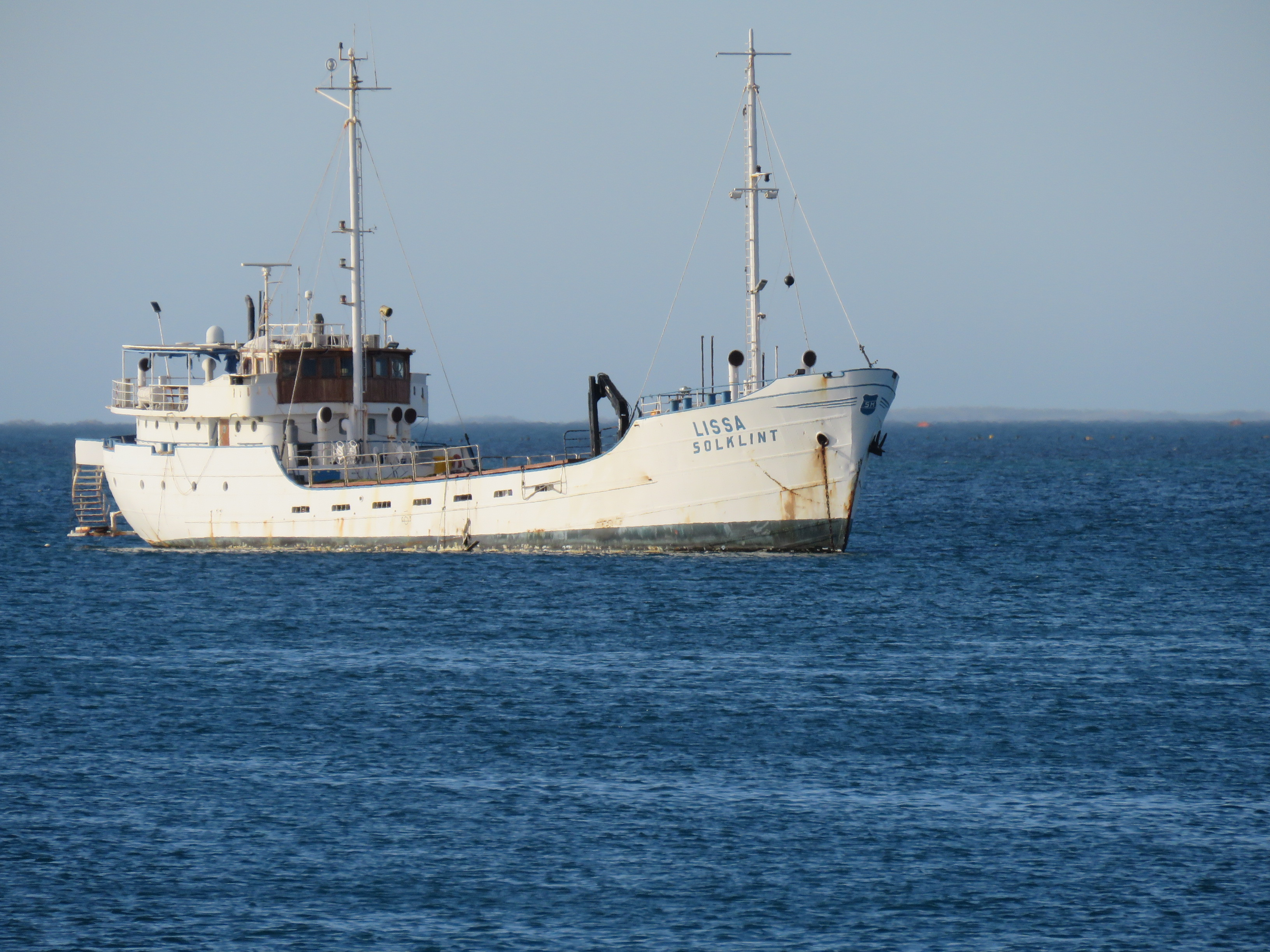
Lissa Solklint in Mangles Bay, January 2021.

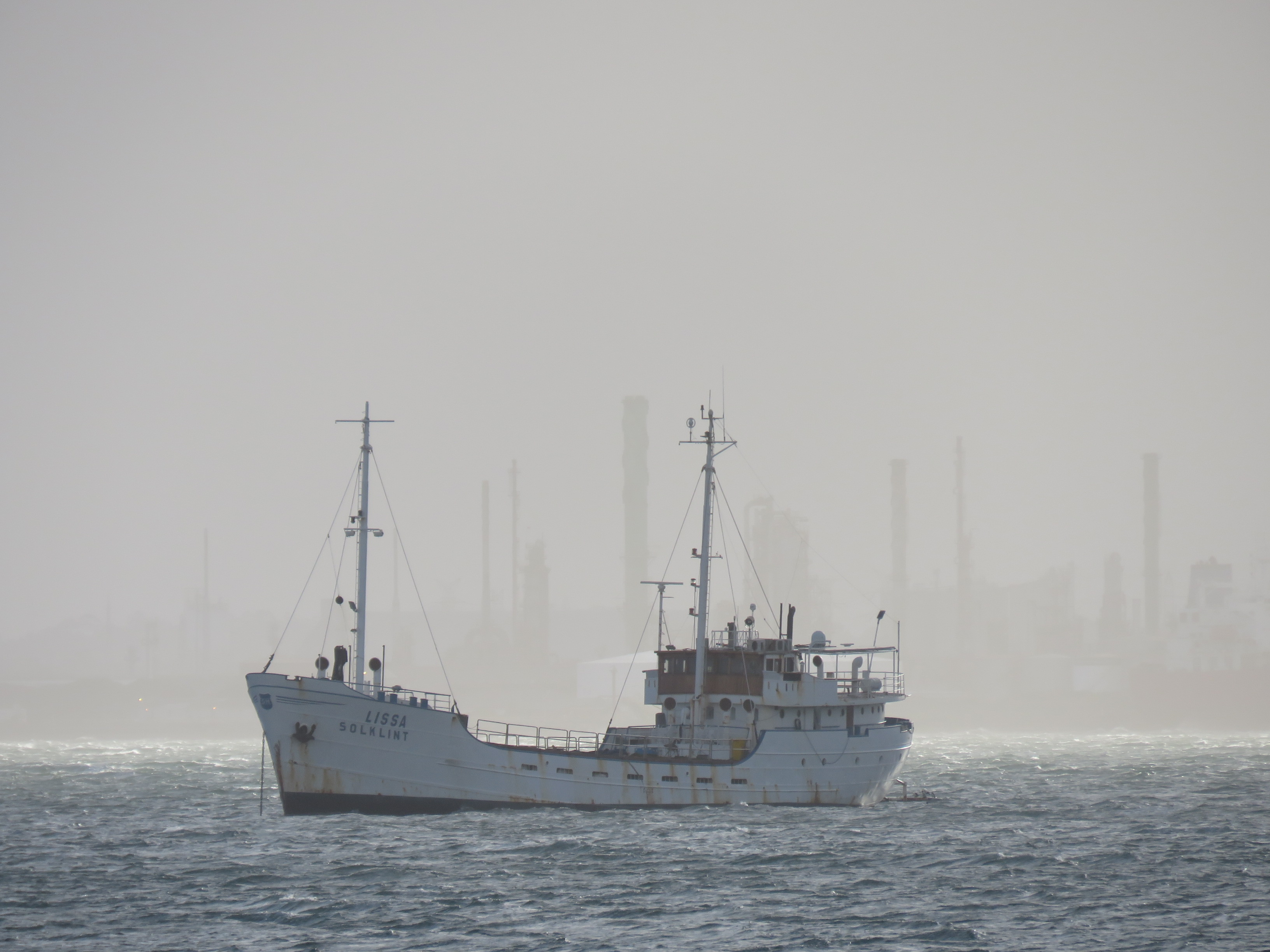
Lissa Solklint in Mangles Bay, July 2021.

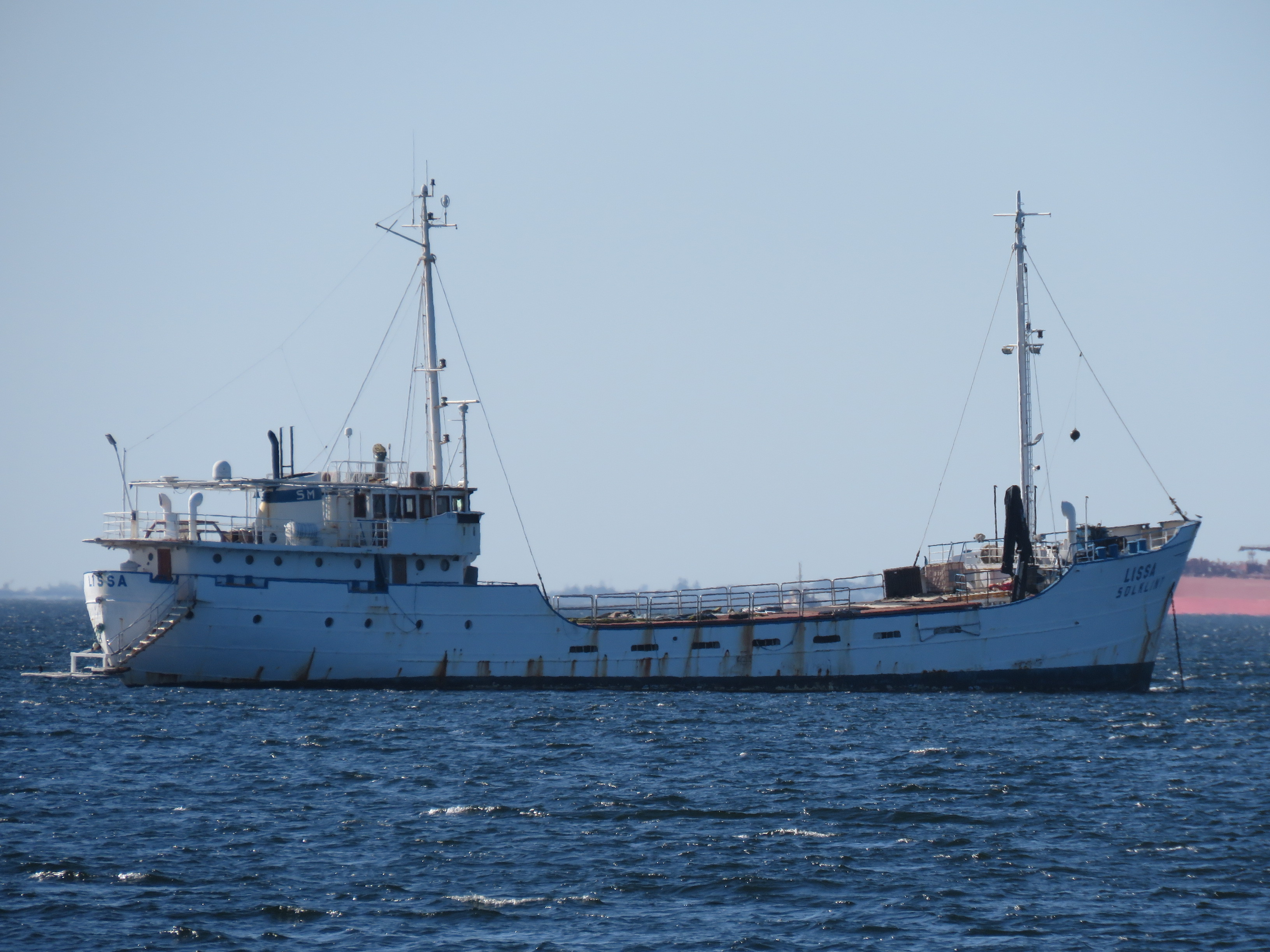
Aft view of Lissa Solklint in Mangles Bay, August 2021.

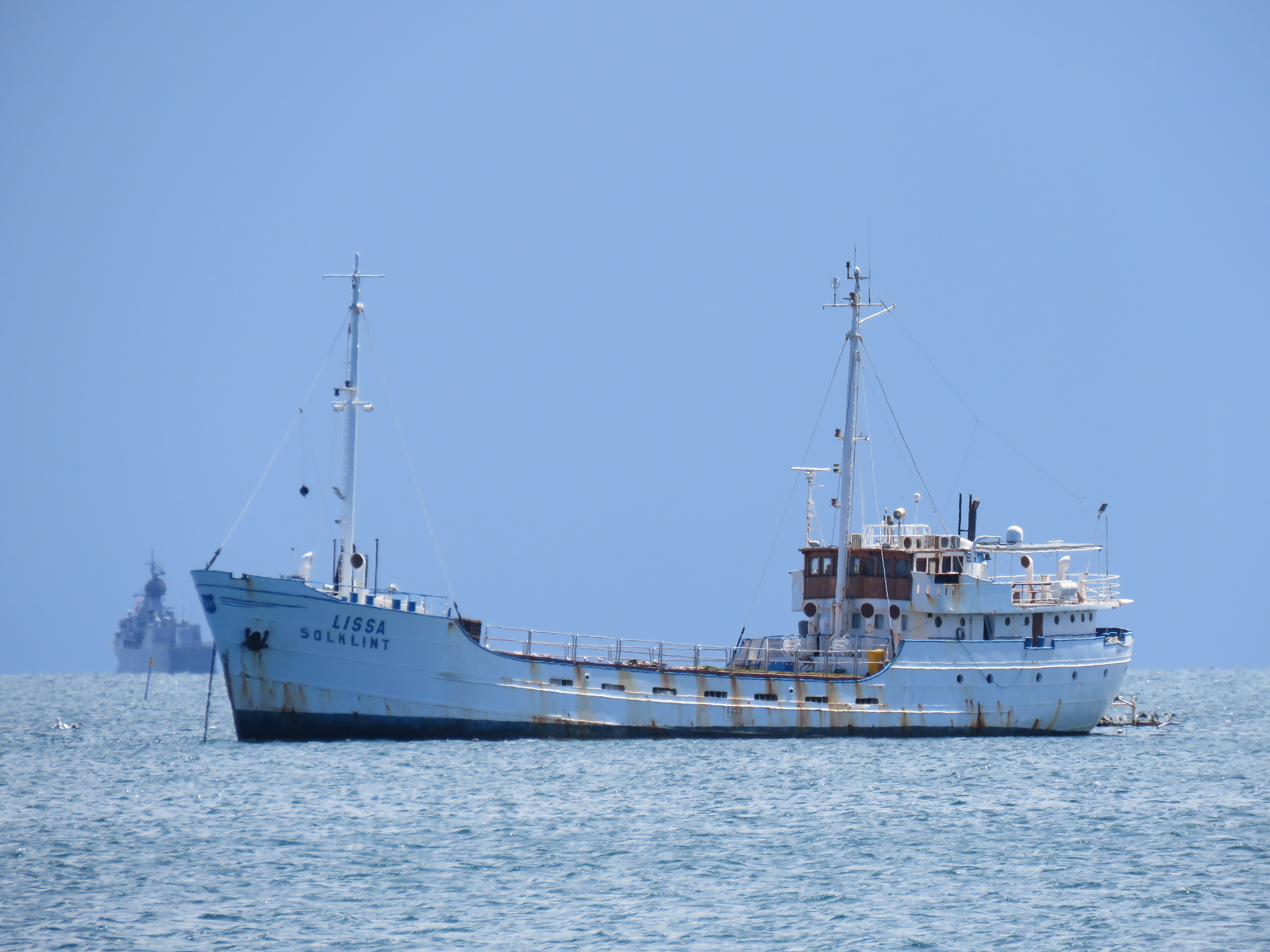
Lissa Solklint in Mangles Bay with HMAS Ballarat in the background, October 2021.

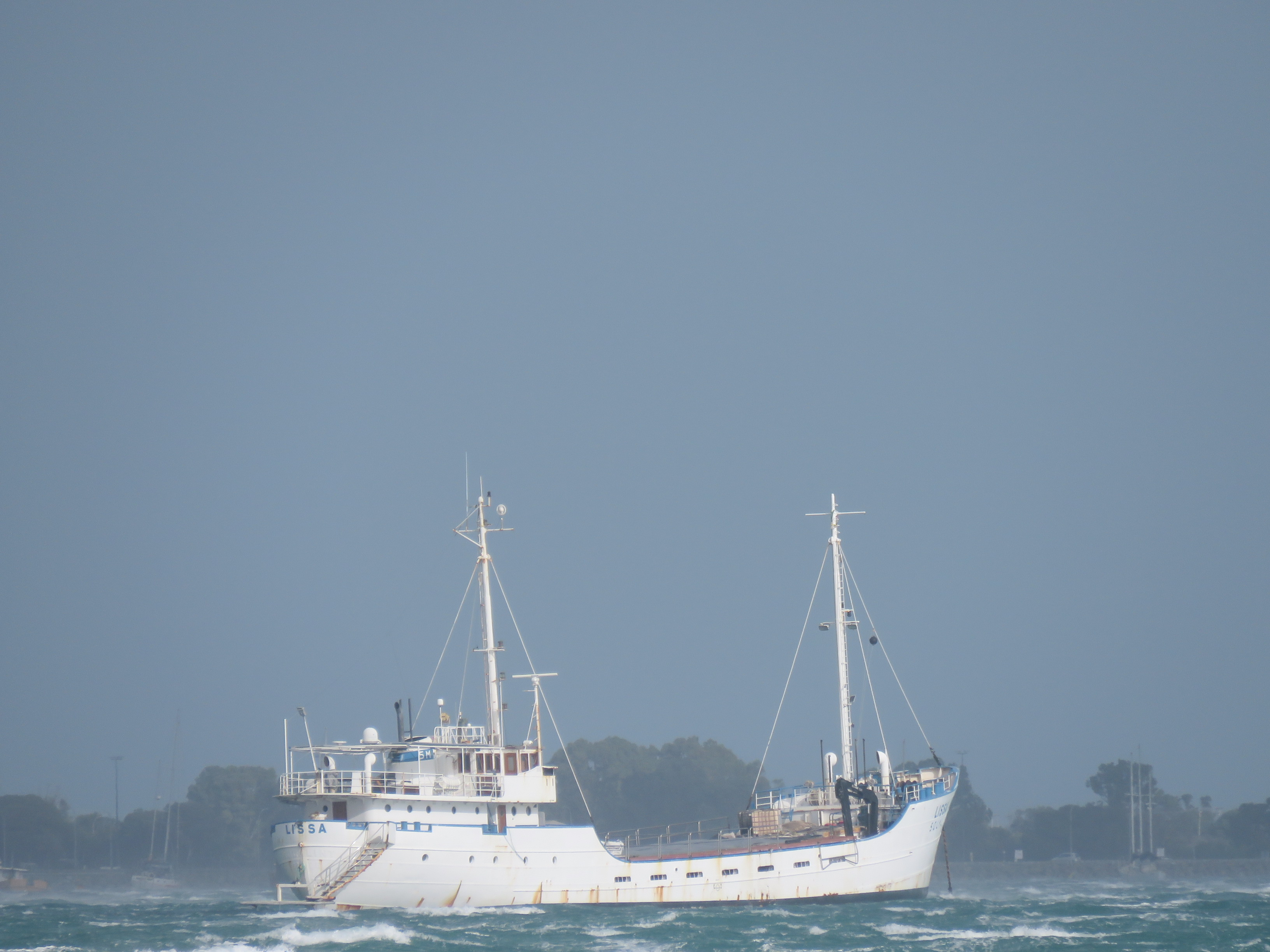
Aft view of issa Solklint in Mangles Bay, August 2022.

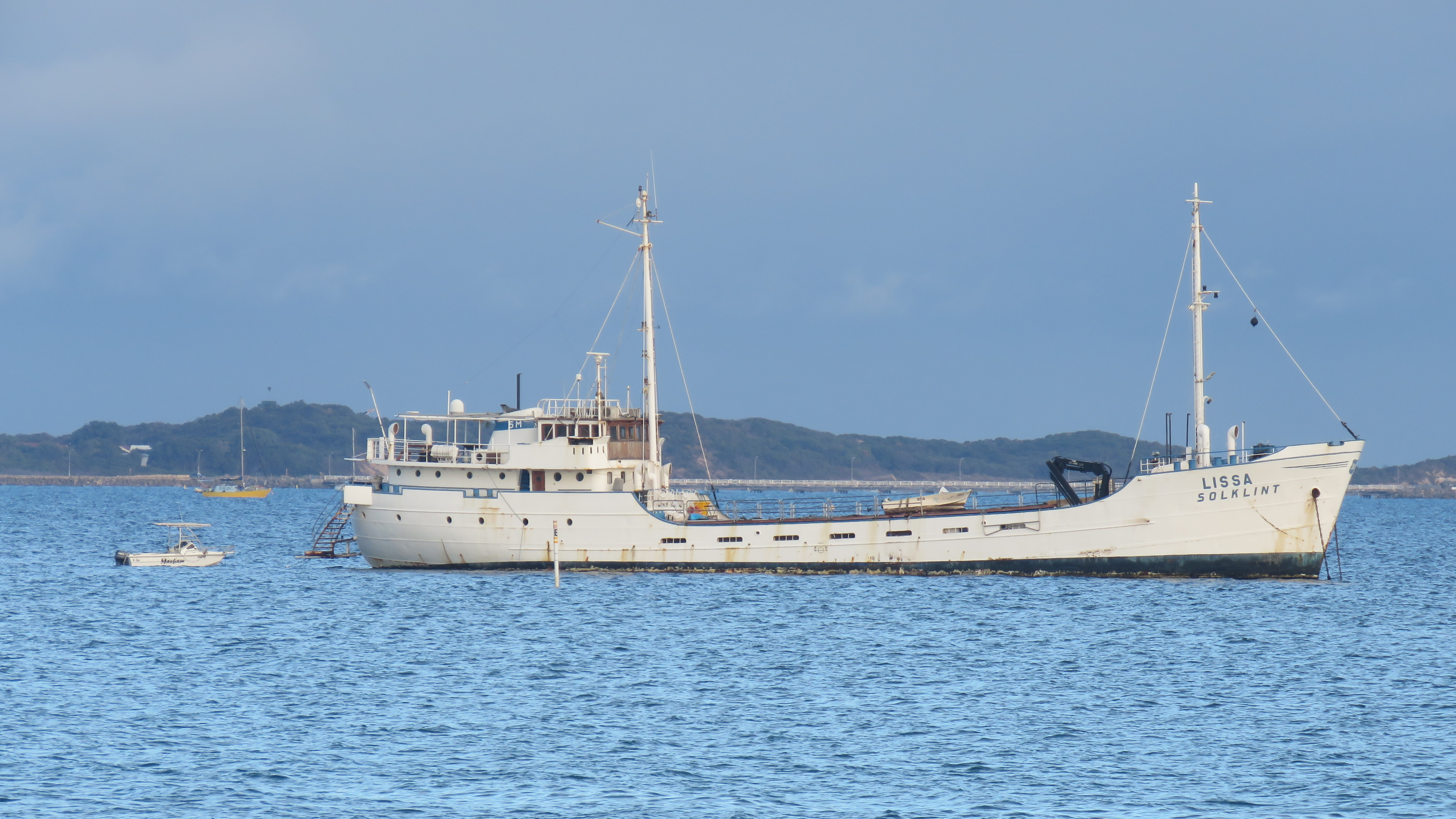
Side view of Lissa Solklint in Mangles Bay, June 2024.

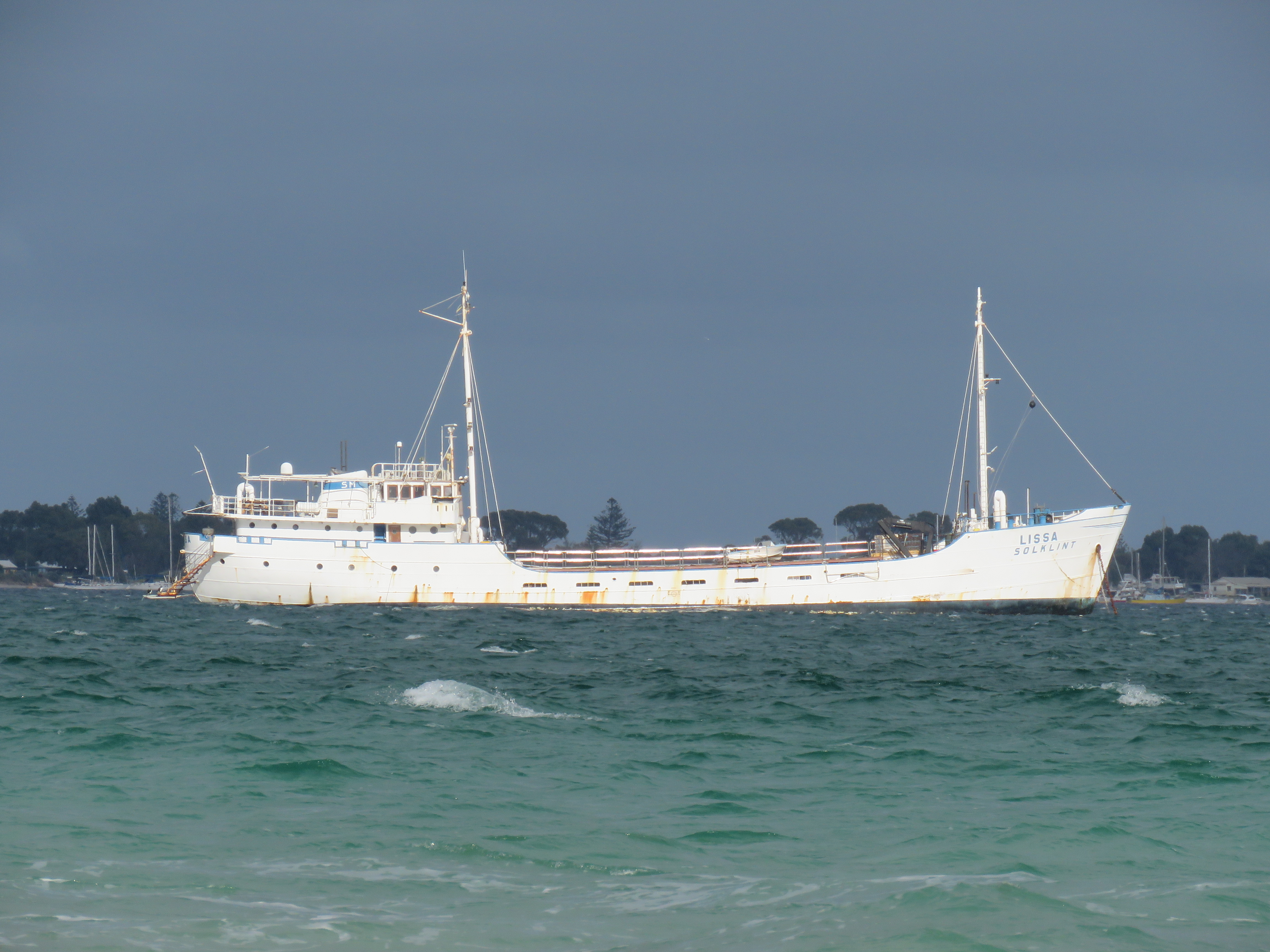
Side view of Lissa Solklint in Mangles Bay, August 2024.

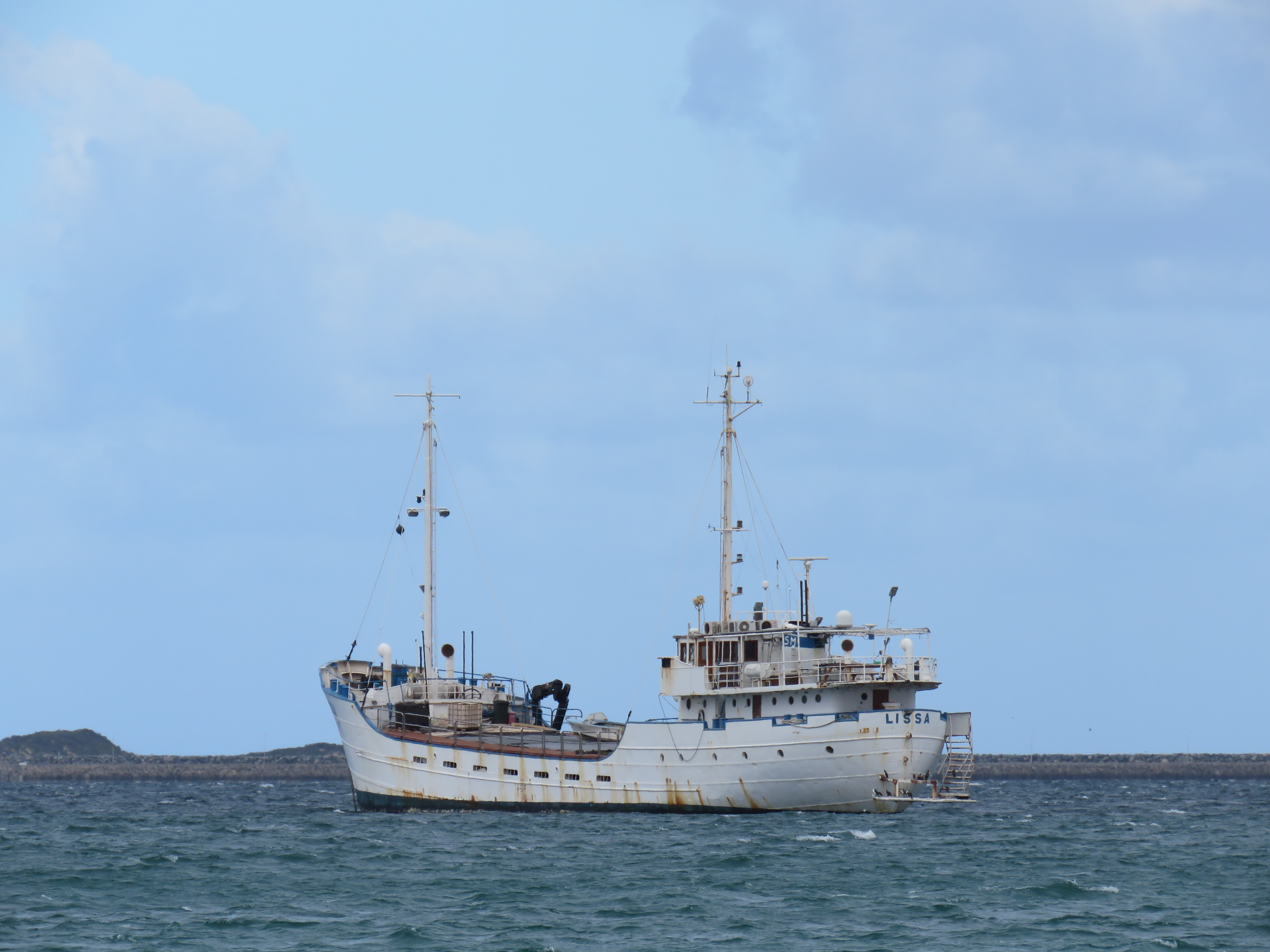
Stern of the Lissa Solklint in Mangles Bay, December 2024.
