= Chris Packer =

- Born: Christopher Packer; 1953
- Died: 1 September 2013 (aged 59–60); Perth, Western Australia
- Occupation: Sailor
- Known for: Yacht racing
- Partner: Gianna Botto
- Children: 2
- Father: Peter Packer
- Relatives: Ron Packer (brother)

Chris Packer (c. 1953 – 1 September 2013) was an Australian multimillionaire from Perth, Western Australia, who in 2004 narrowly escaped the death penalty when arrested in Bali, Indonesia, for suspected arms smuggling. Police arrested Packer after finding undeclared weapons aboard his 53-metre-long (174 ft) cargo ship, Lissa, registered in Avatiu. A veteran sailor, Packer competed in several Sydney to Hobart Yacht Races and was embarking on a round-the-world sailing tour at the time of his arrest.

Packer went into a coma, having had a heart attack on 29 April 2006, but is said to have come out of it weeks later, showing signs of recovery despite severe brain damage. He died on 1 September 2013, under the care of his partner Gianna Botto.

His father Peter Packer won the Sydney to Hobart in 1975 with Rampage; his brother Ron Packer died in 2022.
