= Thomas Baird =

British Vice Admiral

Vice-Admiral Sir Thomas Baird KCB DL
- Born: 17 May 1924 (age 102); Canterbury, Kent, England
- Military career
- Allegiance: United Kingdom
- Branch: Royal Navy
- Service years: 1941–1982
- Rank: Vice-Admiral
- Commands: HMS Glamorgan; Scotland and Northern Ireland
- Conflicts: World War II
- Awards: Knight Commander of the Order of the Bath

Vice-Admiral Sir Thomas Henry Eustace Baird KCB DL (born 17 May 1924) is a former Royal Navy officer who served as Flag Officer, Scotland and Northern Ireland.

== Early life and naval career ==
Baird was born in Canterbury, Kent on 17 May 1924. He was born into a military family, one of five children, but chose a naval career because he wanted to live " separate life" from that of his family. He enrolled in the Royal Naval College, Dartmouth in Devon at the age of 13. In 1941, he joined the Royal Navy.

His first posting was as a midshipman on board HMS Trinidad as part of the Arctic Convoy. On 16 May 1942, the day before Baird's 18th birthday, the ship was attacked by German warplanes after leaving Murmansk, and was subsequently scuttled. Baird was evacutated to Iceland and then returned to Greenock.

He became Captain of the destroyer HMS Glamorgan in 1971. He was appointed Captain of the Fleet in 1973, Chief of Staff, Naval Home Command in 1976 and Director-General of Naval Personnel Services in 1978. He went on to be Flag Officer, Scotland and Northern Ireland in 1979 before retiring in 1982.

Baird was appointed a Knight Commander of the Order of the Bath (KCB) in the 1980 Birthday Honours.

In retirement he was made Chairman of the Executive Committee of the Erskine Hospital in Renfrewshire. He also became Deputy Lieutenant of Ayrshire and Arran.

== Personal life ==
In 1953 he married Angela Florence Ann Paul; they have one son and one daughter. Lady Baird died on 14 May 2009. Baird now lives in Symington, South Ayrshire. As of June 2024, he has five grandchildren and many great-grandchildren.

Military offices
Preceded by Sir Cameron Rusby	Flag Officer, Scotland and Northern Ireland; 1979–1982	Succeeded by Robert Squires
