= Mangles Bay =

Bay in Western Australia

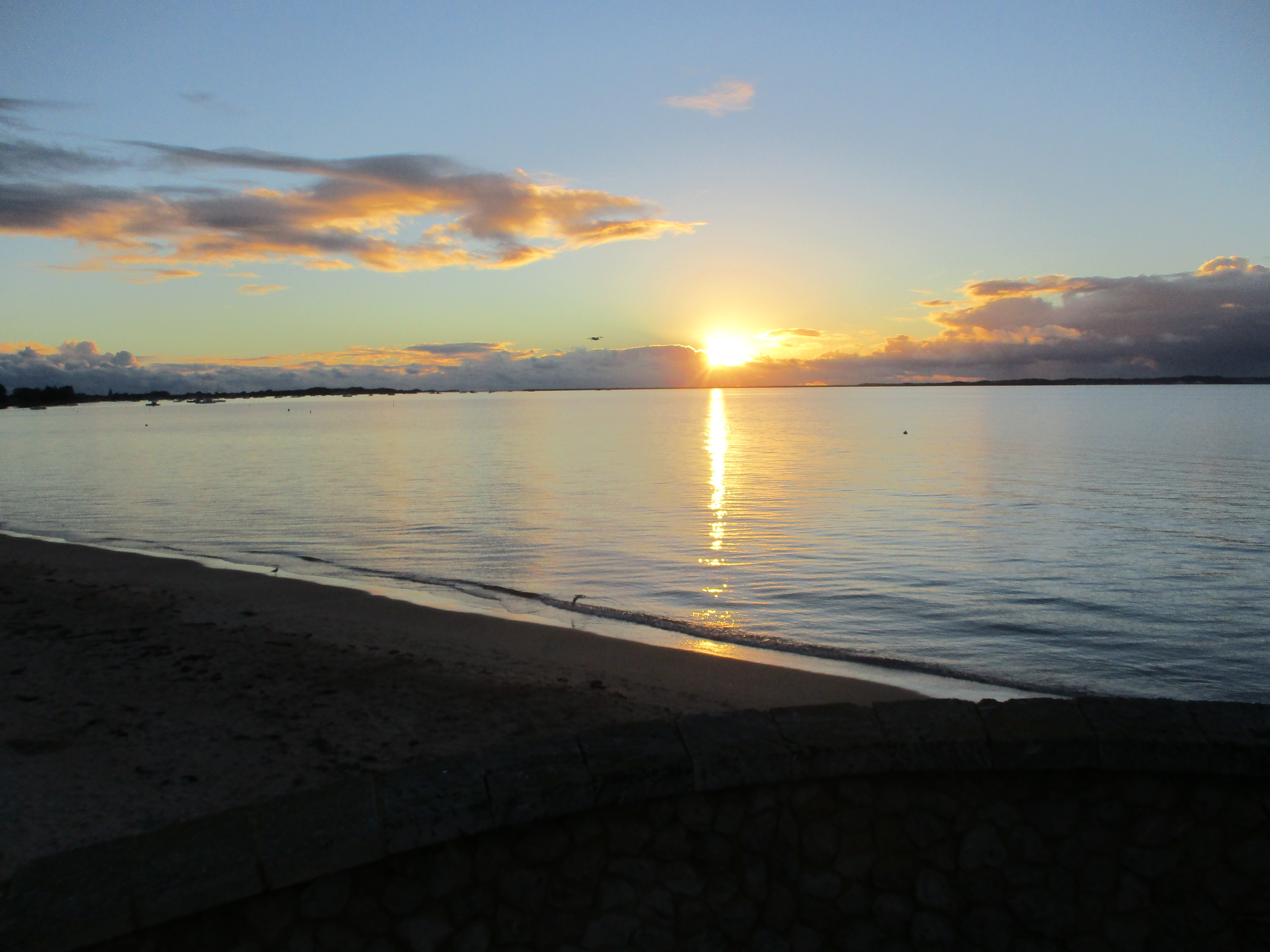
Mangles Bay at sunset, seen from the Rockingham Foreshore

Mangles Bay (32°16′S 115°43′E) is a bay of Cockburn Sound in Western Australia which opens out to the Indian Ocean. The town of Rockingham is on its coast, and the causeway to Garden Island runs along its southern edge. The bay was named for the Mangles family and Ellen Stirling (née Mangles), the wife of Lieutenant-Governor James Stirling.

The bay's seabed consists of the Mangles Bay shallows, which is covered in seagrass meadows; and the Mangles Bay deep basin, a much deeper area slightly to the north.

Mangles Bay is a popular recreation area. It is used for fishing, water sports such as sailing, water skiing, boating and swimming, the Lissa Solklint is permanently anchored here.
