= Jeremy Sanders (Royal Navy officer) =

Royal Navy Rear Admiral (born 1942)

Rear Admiral Jeremy Sanders CB OBE
- Born: 23 November 1942 (age 83)
- Military career
- Allegiance: United Kingdom
- Branch: Royal Navy
- Rank: Rear Admiral
- Commands: 8th Frigate Squadron; Maritime Tactical School; British Forces Gibraltar
- Conflicts: Falklands War
- Awards: Companion of the Order of the Bath; Officer of the Order of the British Empire

Rear Admiral Jeremy Thomas Sanders, CB, OBE (born 23 November 1942) is a retired Royal Navy officer.

== Naval career ==
Educated at Norwood School in Exeter, Pangbourne College and the Britannia Royal Naval College, Sanders was commissioned into the Royal Navy in 1960. After serving on the aircraft carrier, HMS Hermes, in the Falklands War, he became Commanding Officer of HMS Andromeda and Commander of the 8th Frigate Squadron in September 1985, Director of the Maritime Tactical School in May 1987 and Chief Naval Signal Officer in April 1989. He went on to be Director of Naval Warfare in 1990 and Commander British Forces Gibraltar in April 1992.

In retirement he became Chairman of the Trustees of the Falkland Islands Memorial Chapel.
