= Fowey (1798 ship) =

Armed cutter

History

Great Britain
- Name: Fowey
- Launched: 1798

General characteristics
- Tons burthen: 221, or 22188/94, or 22192/94 (bm)
- Length: 67 ft 3 in (20.5 m)
- Beam: 21 ft 9 in (6.6 m)
- Depth of hold: 8 ft 6 in (2.6 m)
- Complement: 1800: 65; 1803: 55
- Armament: 1798: 10 × 12-pounder carronades; 1800: 14 × 12-pounder carronades; 1803: 12 × 12-pounder carronades

Fowey was launched in 1798. She spent a little more than a year-and-a-half as a hired armed cutter for the British Royal Navy. She was sold in 1800 and became a privateer. Her fate after 1804 is currently obscure.

== Hired armed cutter ==
His Majesty's hired armed cutter Fowey served under contract from 10 November 1798 until 20 June 1800. During this period she captured, alone or with others, a number of merchant vessels.

On 8 July 1799 the Portuguese schooner Teijo, of Lisbon, came into Plymouth. She had been sailing from Bristol to Lisbon when the French privateer Vengeance had captured her on 1 July. Fowey, Lieutenant Derby, recaptured Teijo on 3 July. Fowey, Lieutenant John Darby, had recaptured Friends on 17 June, and Teijo on 2 July. On 17 July the Bristol underwriters and shippers on Tejo wrote a letter of appreciation for Lieutenant Derby's initiative in her recapture.

On 12 July the sloop Goodwill came into Cork. She had been sailing from Waterford to Lisbon when she was taken.Fowey had recaptured her.

On 23 July Juno, of Stettin, Joachim Frederick Rogerson, came into Plymouth. She had been sailing from Dantzig to Nantes with a cargo of time when Fowey, Lieutenant Darby, detained her. The capture took place off the Eddystone.

On 12 October Two Friends, J. Schmid, master, came into Plymouth. She had been sailing from Havana to Altona when Fowey captured her. Two Friends had been carrying a cargo of cotton, sugar, and coffee. The vessel was Danish, but the cargo was suspected of being Spanish.

Fowey was one of the seven Royal Navy vessels that shared in the proceeds of the capture of a French sloop on 25 November, and a French brig on 28 November.

== Privateer ==
Fowey was offered for sale at Plymouth on 12 July 1800. The advertisement noted that she was less than two years old, had been a hired armed cutter, and that she would make a good privateer.

Captain Christopher Parnall acquired a letter of marque on 24 February 1801.

On 8 June 1803, Captain John Rowe acquired a letter of marque. By this time she had been converted to a brig.

In August 1803, Lloyd's List reported that the Fowey privateer had taken Amité, which had been sailing from Newfoundland to Bordeaux, and sent her into Guernsey.

In November, the Fowey privateer, of Guernsey, recaptured Flying Fish and sent her into Guernsey. Flying Fish, of Cork, had been sailing from Gibraltar to Cork when a French privateer had captured her.
