= Charles P. Childe =

British surgeon and writer

Charles Plumley Childe
- Born: 1858; Cape Colony
- Died: 30 January 1926 (aged 67–68); Monte Carlo
- Occupations: Surgeon, writer

Charles Plumley Childe (1858 – 30 January 1926) was a British surgeon, cancer researcher and public health activist.

== Biography ==
Childe was born in Cape Colony. He was educated at Cambridge University and King's College Hospital for his medical training. He graduated from the University of the Cape of Good Hope with honours in 1877. He obtained a Warneford scholarship at King's College Hospital. In 1883, obtained the M.R.C.S., in 1885 the L.R.C.P. and in 1900 the M.R.C.P. He took the F.R.C.S. in 1892 and was appointed assistant surgeon to the Royal Portsmouth Hospital. He established himself as one of the most successful surgeons in the South of England. He was surgeon to the Southsea Home for Sick Children and Hampshire and Isle of Wight School for the Blind.

Childe retired in 1923 and was appointed senior honorary consulting surgeon and chairman of the committee of management. He was President of the British Medical Association (1923–1924). Childe was one of the earliest proponents of cancer education to the public. He encouraged early detection of cancer and recourse to surgery. Childe's mission to propagate lay education of cancer was not popular in the United Kingdom during his lifetime but influenced the American Society for the Control of Cancer.

His best known work was The Control of a Scourge: Or How Cancer is Curable, published in 1906. Childe died at Monte Carlo on Jan 30th, 1926, from influenza and pneumonia. He was buried at Highland Road Cemetery, Southsea.

== Selected publications ==
- The Control of a Scourge: Or, How Cancer is Curable (1906)
- Cancer, Public Authorities, and the Public (1914)
- Surgical Nursing and Technique (1916)
- Cancer and the Public: The Educational Aspect of the Cancer Problem (1925)
