= Hospital picture tiles =

Ceramic picture tiles in hospitals

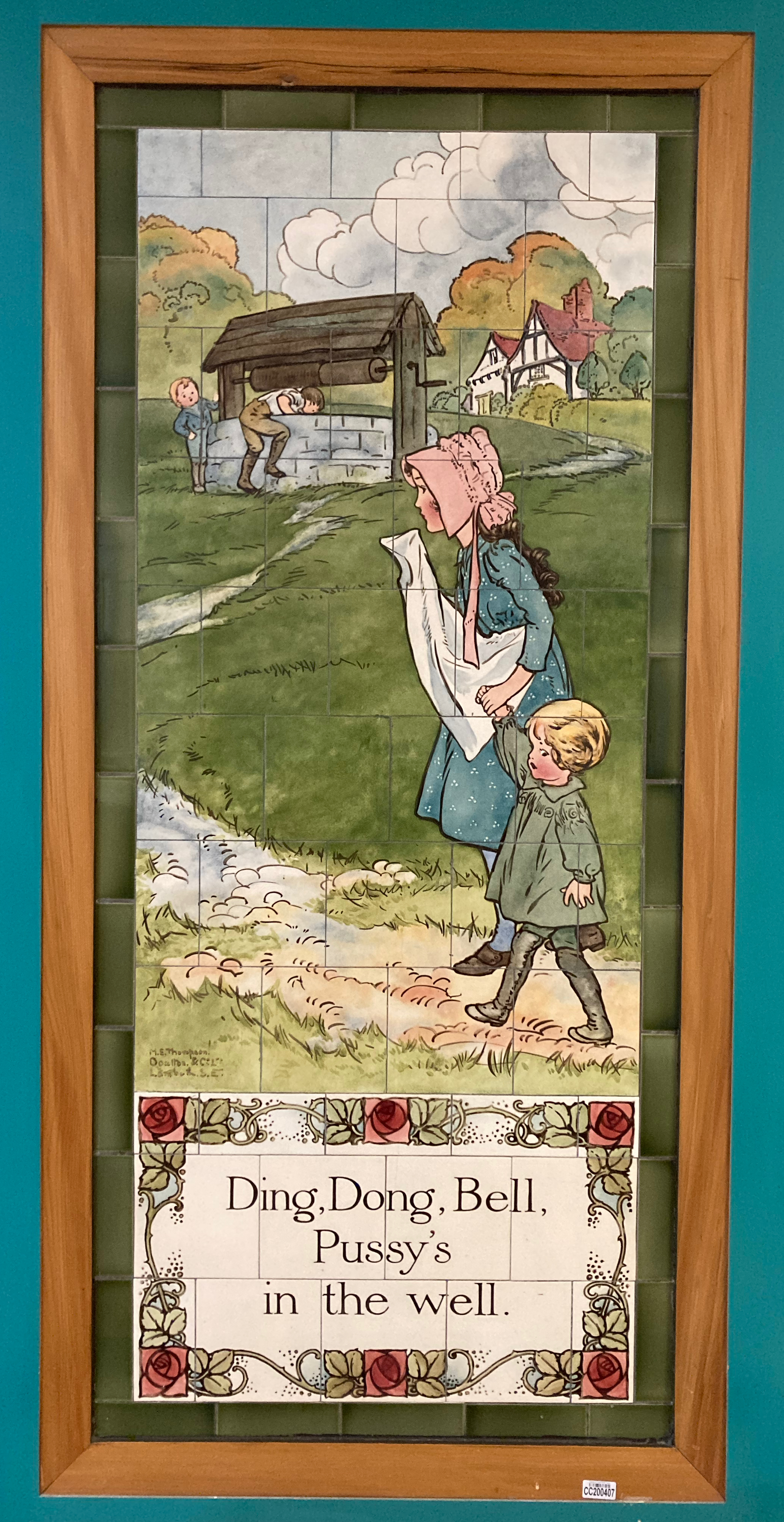
Ding Dong Bell, Wellington Hospital, New Zealand

Hand-painted picture tiles were used to decorate hospitals and other healthcare institutions from the 1870s until the 1920s–30s when hospital designs and building materials changed. Many children's wards were decorated with panels of tiles of nursery rhymes and fairy tales which provided entertainment for sick children. A range of other subjects were depicted on tiles. Preservation of tiles as hospital buildings were renovated or demolished proved difficult and many picture tiles have been lost. Some hospitals in England and New Zealand have been able to preserve their tiles.

== History ==
Tile making became a major industry in the United Kingdom in the Victorian period. As infection control in hospitals began to be understood the use of tiles in hospital increased as their glazed surfaces could be easily cleaned. One of the earliest known examples of hospital tiles was at the Stamford and Rutland Hospital's fever wards which opened in 1879. Other early examples of tiling were at Ballymona Hospital, Isle of Man (c. 1878-80), Shrewsbury ENT Hospital (1881), Derbyshire Children’s Hospital (1883), Charing Cross Hospital (1890s), Paddington Green Children’s Hospital (1895), Birmingham General Infirmary (1897) and the Bedford Infirmary (1898).

By end of the 19th century tile pictures of nursery rhymes, animals and fairy tales became popular in children's wards as a way of amusing and distracting sick children.

There was a range of other subjects depicted on tiles. At Stamford and Rutland Hospital the tiles, executed by artist Alan Slater and manufactured by Minton Hollins, depicted men and women in agricultural activities such as harvesting, scything, apple picking and ploughing as well as skating in winter and a ploughman with horses. Blue and white Delft tiles and heraldic panels of tiles decorated the walls and winter garden at Talygarn, a Welsh rehabilitation centre for injured miners. The entrance to the Penkelly Residential Home in Hereford was decorated by tiles showing the four seasons. At the Cardiff Royal Infirmary tiles depicted Welsh history and the coronation of King George V. Art nouveau tiles of birds, flowers, trees and women made by Doulton decorated the proscenium arch of the recreation hall of St Nicholas Hospital in Gosforth. Domestic and agricultural scenes were depicted in the Charing Cross Hospital tiles (later moved to the hospital in Fulham Palace Rd). Wall tiles by Medmenham Pottery Co. were installed in the Hospital for Women in Soho Square while tiled flooring was used at Coleshill Hospital and the Radcliffe Infirmary. Princesses Elizabeth and Margaret were the subjects of tiles installed in the Princess Elizabeth Children's Ward at the King Edward Hospital in Ealing in 1935. In Shrewsbury Faith, Hope and Charity were depicted on tiles at the Eye, Ear and Throat Hospital which were later moved to the Royal Shrewsbury Hospital.

During the 20th century hospital design changed and older hospitals were renovated or demolished. Electric lighting replaced large pavilion windows and hand painted tiles were replaced by easily cleaned surfaces such as linoleum, vinyl, Formica, cheaper plain ceramic tiles and glossy wall panels. Hand-painted tiles were generally out of fashion by the 1940s though were being made as late as 1958.

Tile pictures have been lost as hospitals were demolished and some were lost during bombing in World War II.

== Manufacture and installation ==
Tiles were manufactured using the underglaze technique: making the tile, followed by hand painting, glazing and firing. Most individual tiles measured 6 by 6 inches (15 cm × 15 cm) and were used to make up panels of pictures ranging in size from 6 by 12 inches (15 cm × 30 cm) to 10 by 8 feet (300 cm × 240 cm) panels. Panels were commonly placed between the large pavilion windows in the hospital wards. Occasionally tiles decorated complete walls. The tiles were permanently fixed to the walls which presented problems later for their removal and preservation.

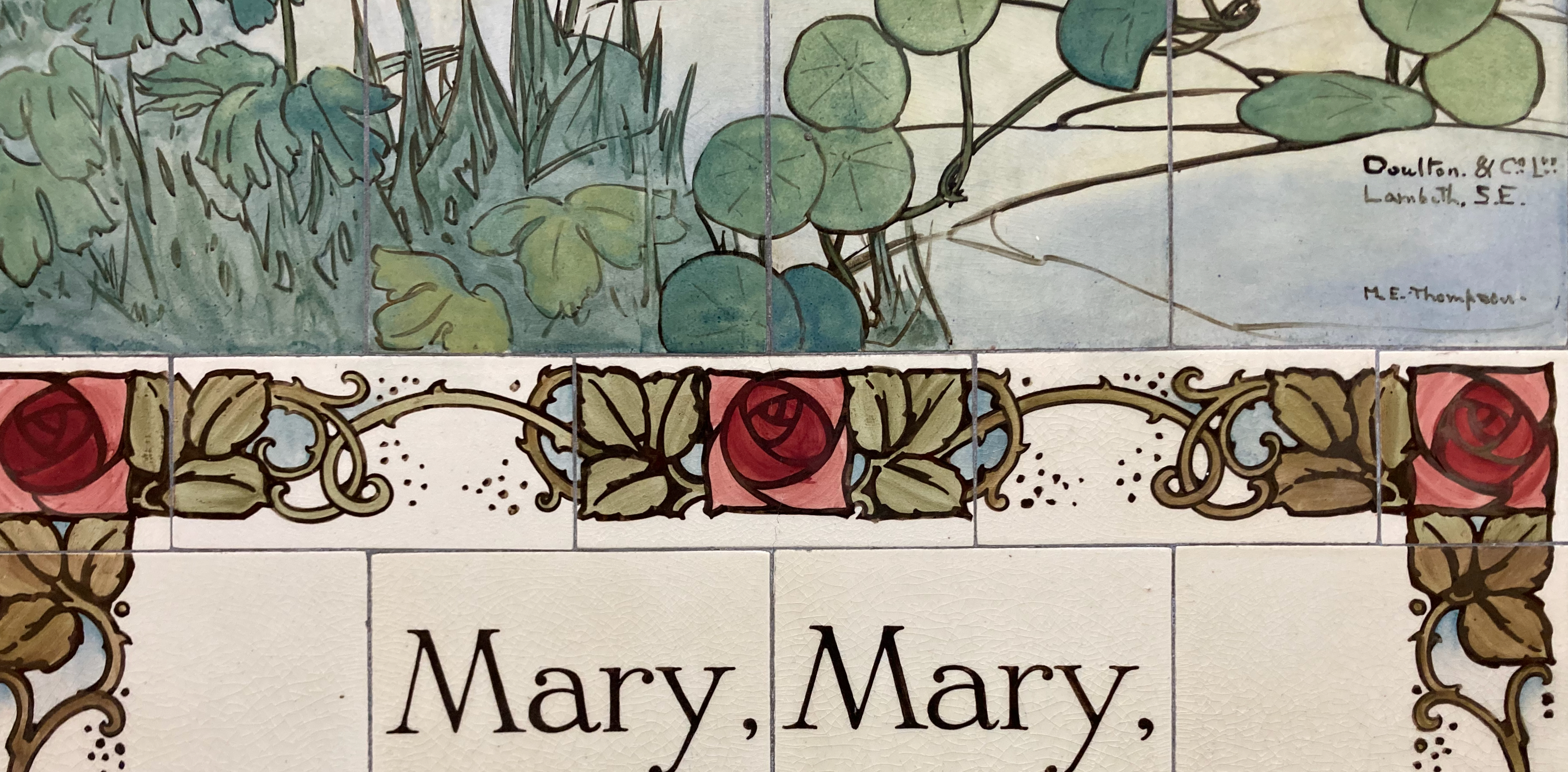
Tile at Wellington Hospital, New Zealand with signature of artist Margaret Thompson

Tile makers were Burmantofts, Leeds; Brown Westhead & Moore, Hanley, Stoke-on-Trent; Carter & Co., Poole; Copeland & Sons, Stoke-on-Trent; Corn Bros., Tunstall; Craven Dunnill & Co., Jackfield, Shropshire; De Morgan, London and Merton; Doulton, Lambeth; Godwin, Hereford; Maw & Co., Broseley and Jackfield; Minton and Minton Hollins, Stoke-on-Trent; W.B. Simpson and Sons, London; The Medmenham Pottery Co., Marlow Common; Thynne, Hereford.

Tiles were sometimes signed by the artists or manufacturer. Some of the artists were William Rowe, J.H. McLennan and Margaret E. Thompson of Doulton; Philip Newman of Simpson and Sons; Edward Ball of Maw & Co.; William de Morgan of De Morgan.

== Preservation of tiles ==
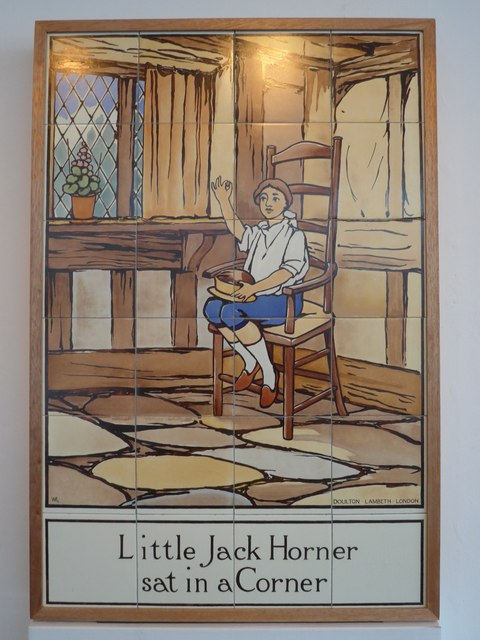
Little Jack Horner, Havant Hospital

At the Royal Victoria Infirmary in Newcastle 56 nursery rhyme and fairy tale tiles, designed by artists William Rowe, Margaret Thompson and J.H. McLennan and made by Doulton, were installed in the children's ward of the Royal Victoria Infirmary in 1906. They were painted over in the 1950s but later uncovered. In 1993 when the children's ward was to be moved and turned into a geriatric ward the cost of moving them to the new children's ward was £240,000. In 2004 the hospital was expanded and the tiles were removed for storage and restoration; by 2009 a decision had not been made on their reinstallation.

Eight framed tile pictures were erected in the children’s ward of the Buchanan Hospital in St Leonard's on Sea (Hastings) in 1908 and later moved to the outpatients’ department. They were painted by Margaret Thompson of Doultons. A tiled picture of the Virgin and Child was in the hospital chapel. Six of the tiles were stolen from the outpatient department in 1995. Some remaining tiles were later installed in the early 2000s in the Conquest Hospital which replaced the Buchanan.

Tiles in the Bedford Hospital's children's ward, designed and painted by Philip H. Newman, date from 1898. They were threatened with being covered up in 1997. In 2019 a proposal by the hospital to move the tiles to a museum because of concerns about hygiene was rejected by the Bedford Council. The twenty tiles remain on display in the hospital.

At the Royal Berkshire Hospital in Reading the almost six foot high tiles were threatened with removal in 1996. The tiles, designed by Alfred Drury, were installed in 1912 in the King Edward VII children's ward. They are still in place in the King Edward Ward which, as at 2026, is used for chemotherapy treatment.

In 1985 Hartlepool nursery rhyme tiles, painted by Edward W. Ball of Maw & Co. and dating from 1926, were removed from the children's ward at St Hilda's Hospital, Hartlepool after it closed and moved by specialists to the Hartlepool General Hospital.

Tiles depicting nursery rhymes, fairy tales and animals and birds dating from 1929 to 1935 were installed in the Alderman Thomas Parkinson Children’s Ward in the Princess Mary Wing of the Preston Infirmary. When the infirmary closed in 1989 the nursery rhyme tiles were saved.

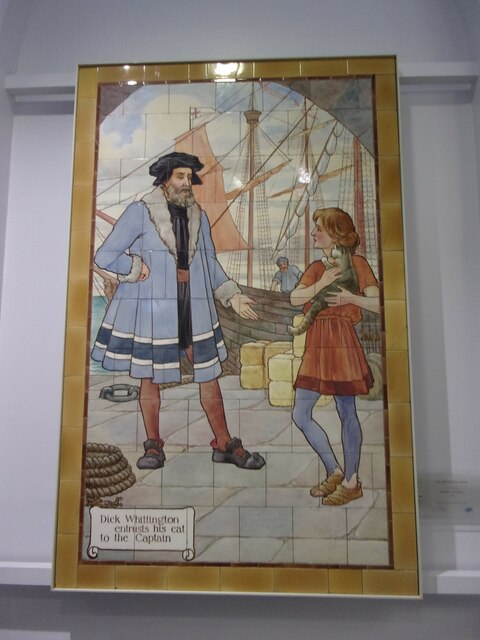
Dick Whittington, St Thomas' Hospital

The two children's wards, named Lilian and Seymour, in St Thomas' Hospital in London opened in 1901 and 1903 and were decorated with fairy tale and nursery rhyme tiles. The 25 Lilian tiles panels, measuring approximately 5 by 2 feet (152 cm × 61 cm), were designed by William Rowe. The Seymour tiles were designed by William Rowe and Margaret Thompson and all were manufactured by Doultons. They were met with approval from the Queen who on visiting the hospital in 1914 declared them to be "a splendid idea" and a visiting American nurse who also praised them for providing pleasure for sick children. When Seymour Ward was demolished some tiles were lost and those remaining re-sited in the new hospital; likewise Lilian Ward closed in the 1970s and a Doulton Tile Fund and the hospital trustees bore the cost of restoring and framing the tiles for display in the new hospital.

Two hospitals in New Zealand have preserved their tiles. In Invercargill £220 was raised by a group of children called the Little Southlanders for 38 tiles of nursery rhymes and Aesop's fables which were installed in the children's ward in Kew Hospital in 1937. The tiles were designed and manufactured by H. & G. Thynne of Hereford, England. The children's ward closed in 1978 and the tiles were put into storage. In 2006 the first set of preserved tiles were installed in a hospital corridor in Southland Hospital and further sets reinstated in 2008.

In Wellington the King Edward VII Hospital for children opened in 1912. The hospital was decorated with 18 Doulton nursery rhyme tile murals which cost £817 at the time ($NZ150,000 in 2020). In 1988 a new children's ward opened and the old hospital was demolished. Although the tiles were destined for destruction with the building the decision was made to save them which presented considerable technical challenges as the tiles were cemented strongly to the unstable brick walls and columns. The bricks around each panel of tiles had to be cut from the walls and then a thin layer of structural concrete was applied to the bricks to hold the bricks and panels in place. Doulton were consulted on the removal and contributed towards the cost. Although some panels did not survive the remaining ones were reinstated in the corridor between the Regional Hospital Buildings and Clinical Services Block.

== Selected locations of tiles ==
The following locations of hospital tiles were listed by Groome in his 1987 book unless otherwise indicated.

=== British Isles ===
- Aberystwyth: Bronglais Hospital
- Alton: Lord Mayor Treloar Hospital
- Bedford: General Hospital
- Belfast: Royal Belfast Hospital for Sick Children
- Birmingham: General Hospital, Maternity Hospital, Coleshill Hall Hospital
- Bournemouth: Boscombe Hospital
- Bristol: Royal Infirmary
- Cardiff: Royal Infirmary
- Cirencester: Querns Hospital
- Cromer: General Hospital
- Derby: Derbyshire Children’s Hospital
- Dorchester: Herrison Hospital
- Edinburgh: Royal Hospital for Sick Children
- Exeter: Exminster Hospital
- Garston: Manor Rehabilitation Centre
- Hartlepool: St Hilda’s Hospital
- Hastings: Buchanan Hospital
- Havant: War Memorial Hospital
- Hemel Hempstead: Hospital
- Hereford: Penkelly Residential Home
- Heswall: Royal Liverpool Children’s Hospital
- Isle of Man: Ballamona Hospital
- Jersey: St Helier Maternity Hospital
- Llanelli: General Hospital
- Leeds: General Infirmary
- London: St Bartholomew’s Hospital, Belgrave Children’s Hospital, Bolingbroke Hospital, Charing Cross Hospital, Cheyne Centre for Spastics, Central Middlesex Hospital, Ealing King Edward Hospital, Guy's Hospital, King’s College Hospital, King’s Fund Miniature Hospital, The Middlesex Hospital, Moorfields Eye Hospital, North Middlesex Hospital, Paddington Green Children’s Hospital, Richmond Fellowship (Addison Rd), St Mary’s Hospital (Praed St), St Mary’s Hospital for Women and Children (Plaistow), St Thomas’ Hospital, University College Hospital, Waterloo Hospital, Westminster Hospital, Women’s Hospital (Soho Square)
- Maesteg: General Hospital
- Maidstone: Preston Hall Hospital
- Mid-Glamorgan: Talygarn Rehabilitation Centre
- Newcastle: Royal Victoria Infirmary, St Nicholas Hospital (Jubilee Theatre) (Gosforth)
- Newport: Royal Gwent Hospital
- Norwich: Whitlingham Hospital
- Ormskirk: Brandreth Hospital
- Oxford: Radcliffe Infirmary
- Poole: District Hospital
- Portsmouth: Royal Hospital
- Preston: Royal Infirmary
- Reading: Borocourt Hospital, Royal Berkshire Hospital
- Shrewsbury: Eye and ENT Hospital
- Stamford: Stamford and Rutland Hospital
- Stockport: Infirmary
- Stoke-on-Trent: Longton Hospital, North Staffordshire Royal Infirmary
- Torquay: Torbay Hospital
- Tunbridge Wells: Tunbridge Wells General Hospital, Kent and Sussex Hospital
- West Kirby: Residential School

=== New Zealand ===
- Invercargill: Kew Hospital (later Southland Hospital)
- Wellington: Wellington Hospital
- Christchurch: Christchurch Hospital
- Oamaru: Oamaru Hospital

=== India ===
- Poona (Pune): The Jacob Sassoon Hospital

== Gallery ==
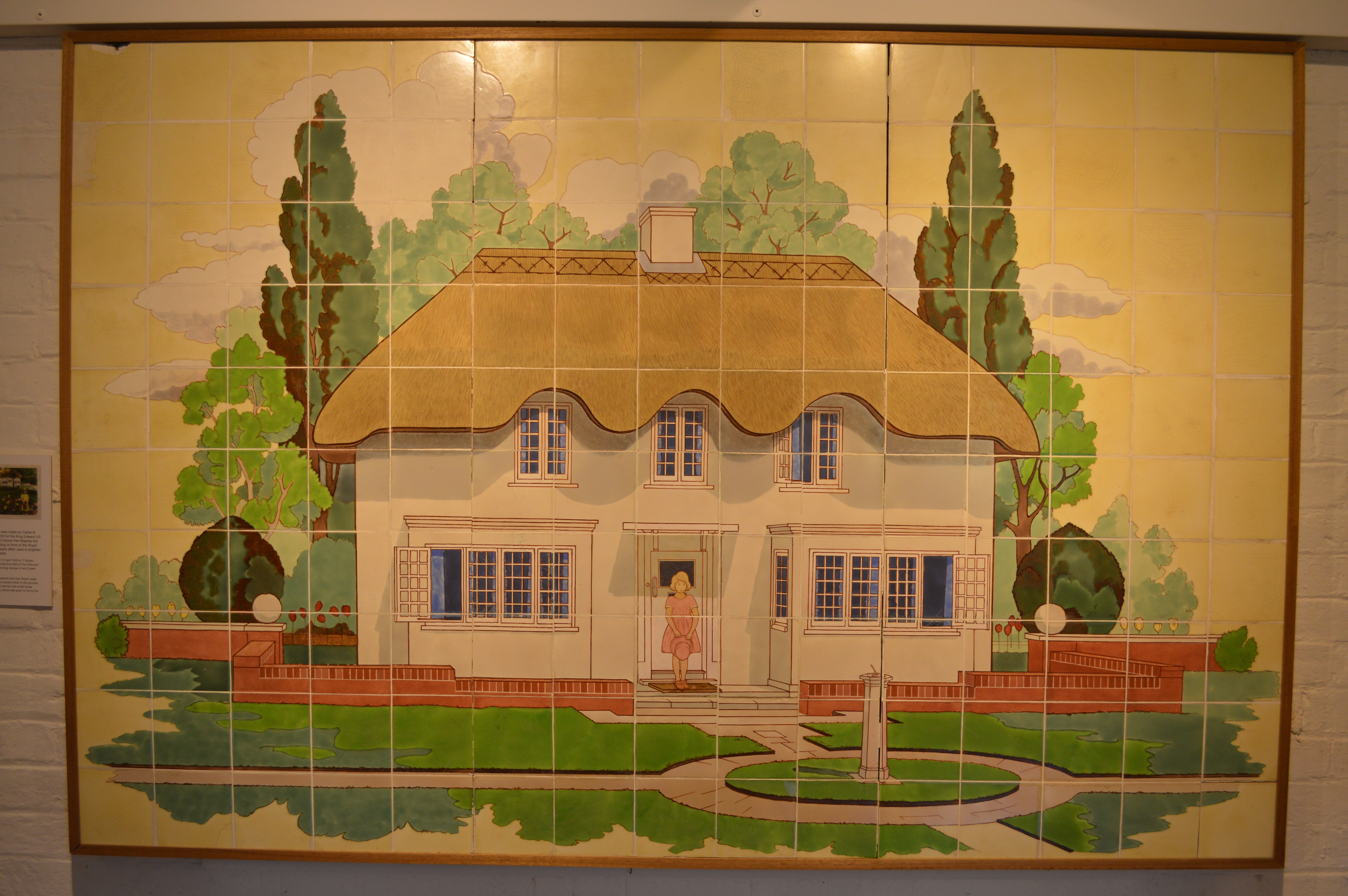
Ealing Hospital

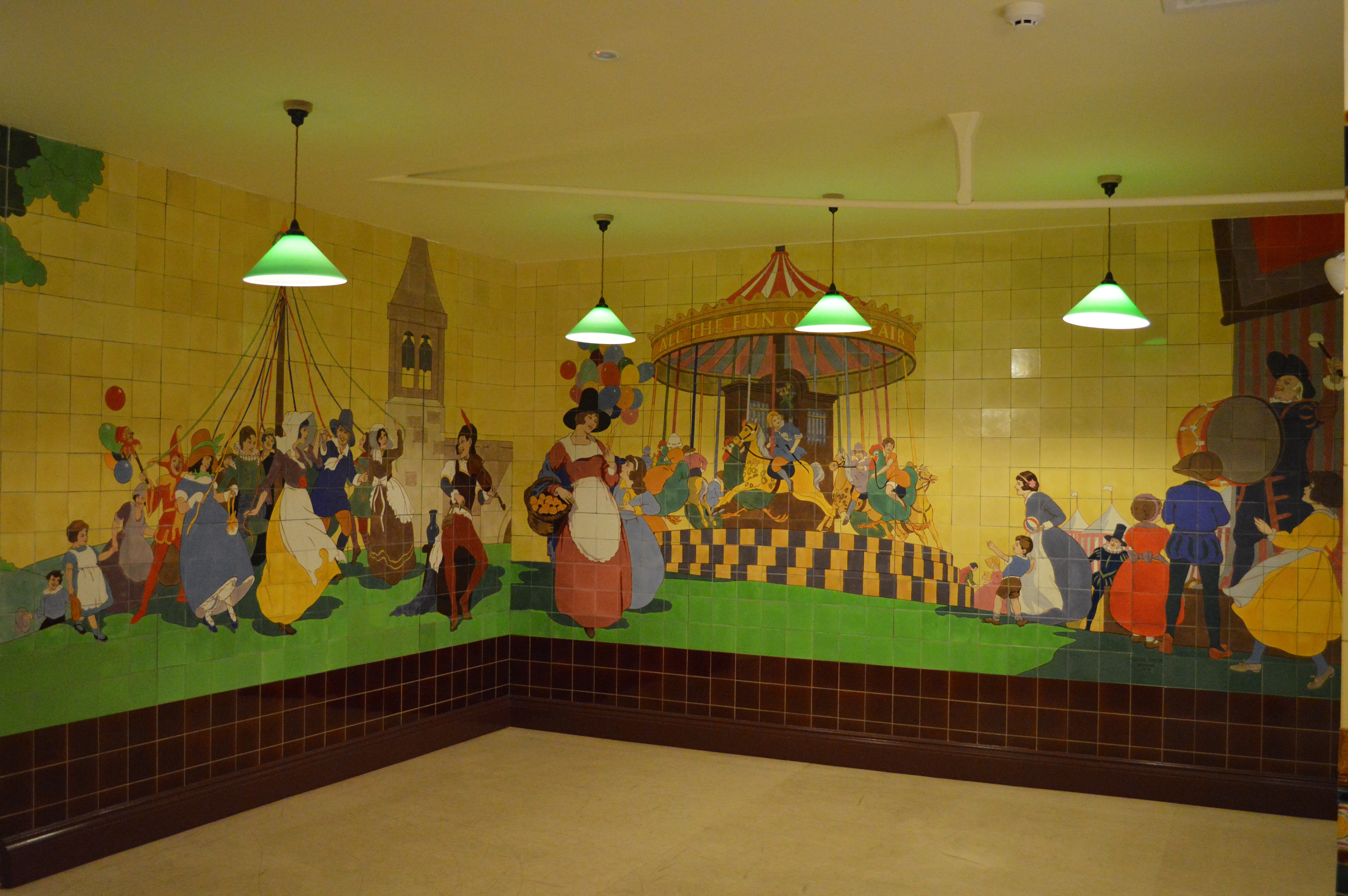
Middlesex Hospital

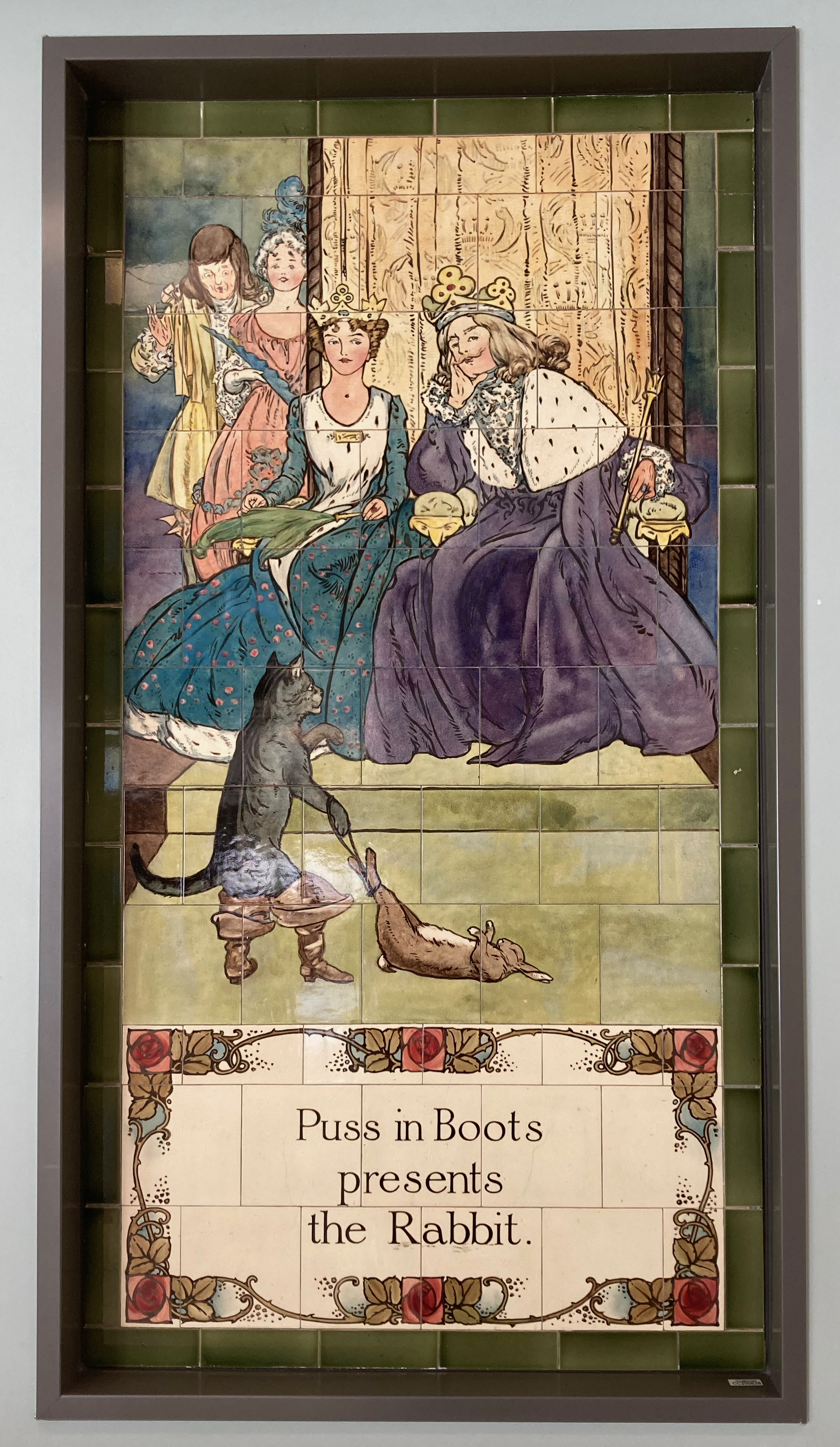
Wellington Hospital

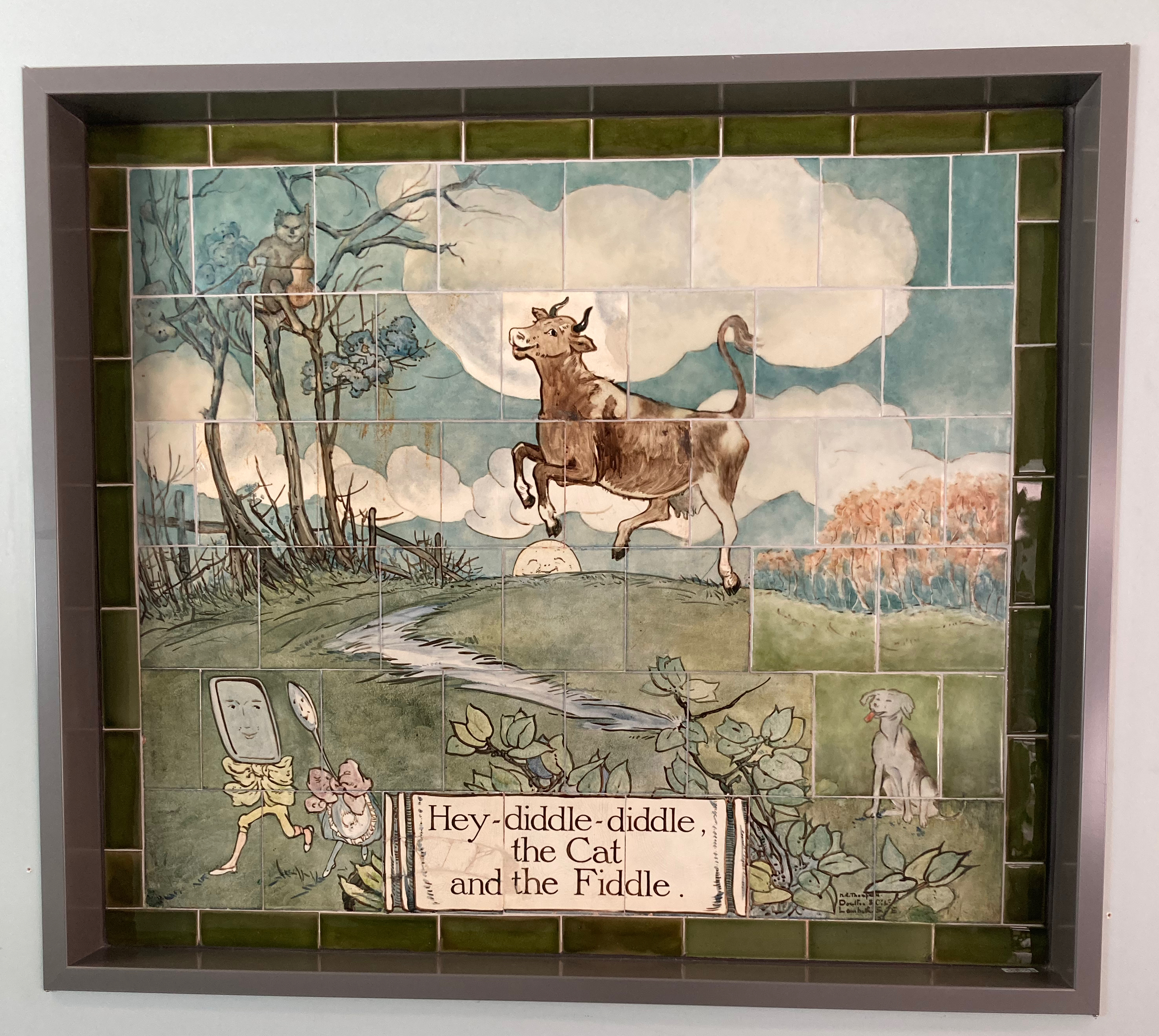
Wellington Hospital

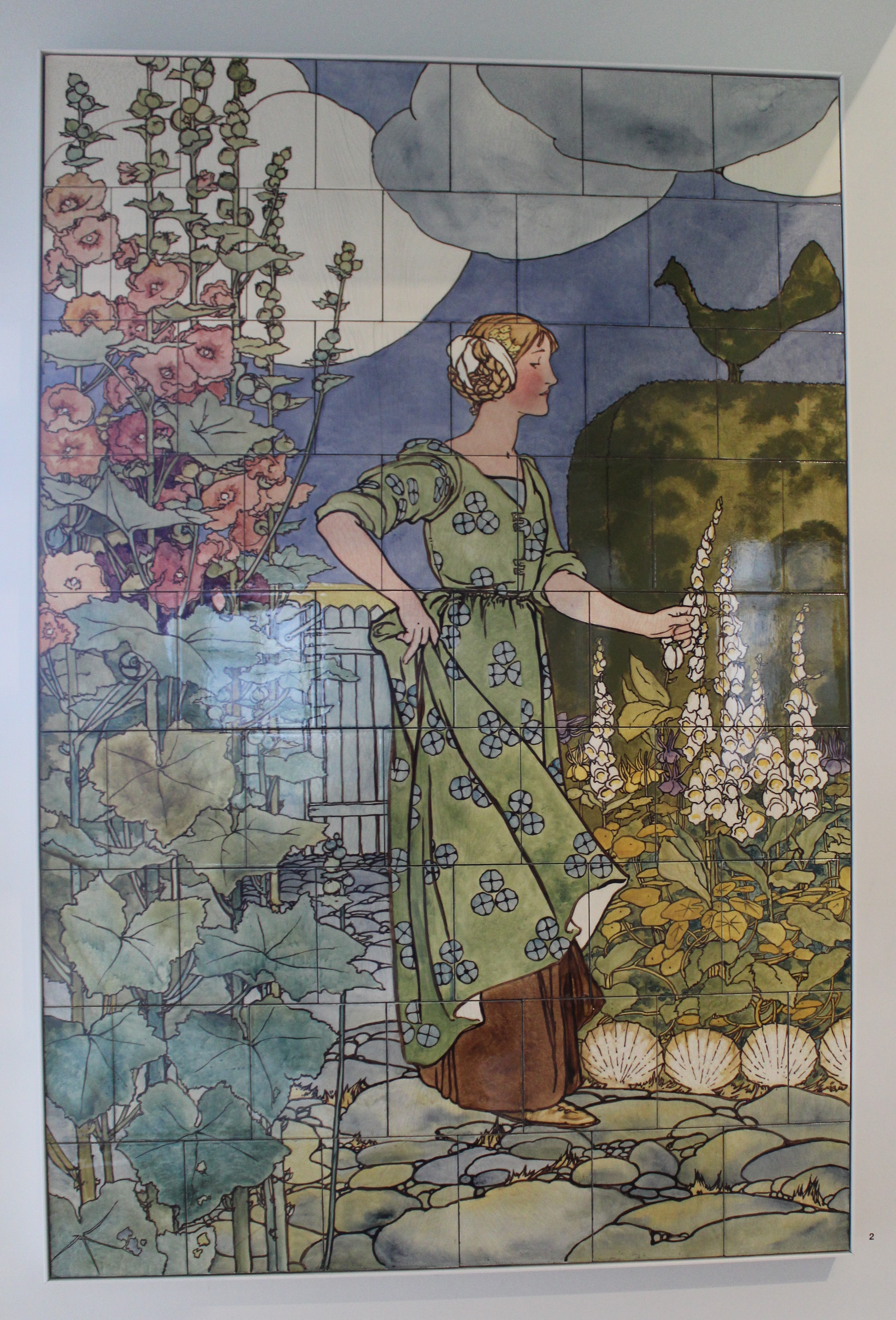
Tile from a London Hospital

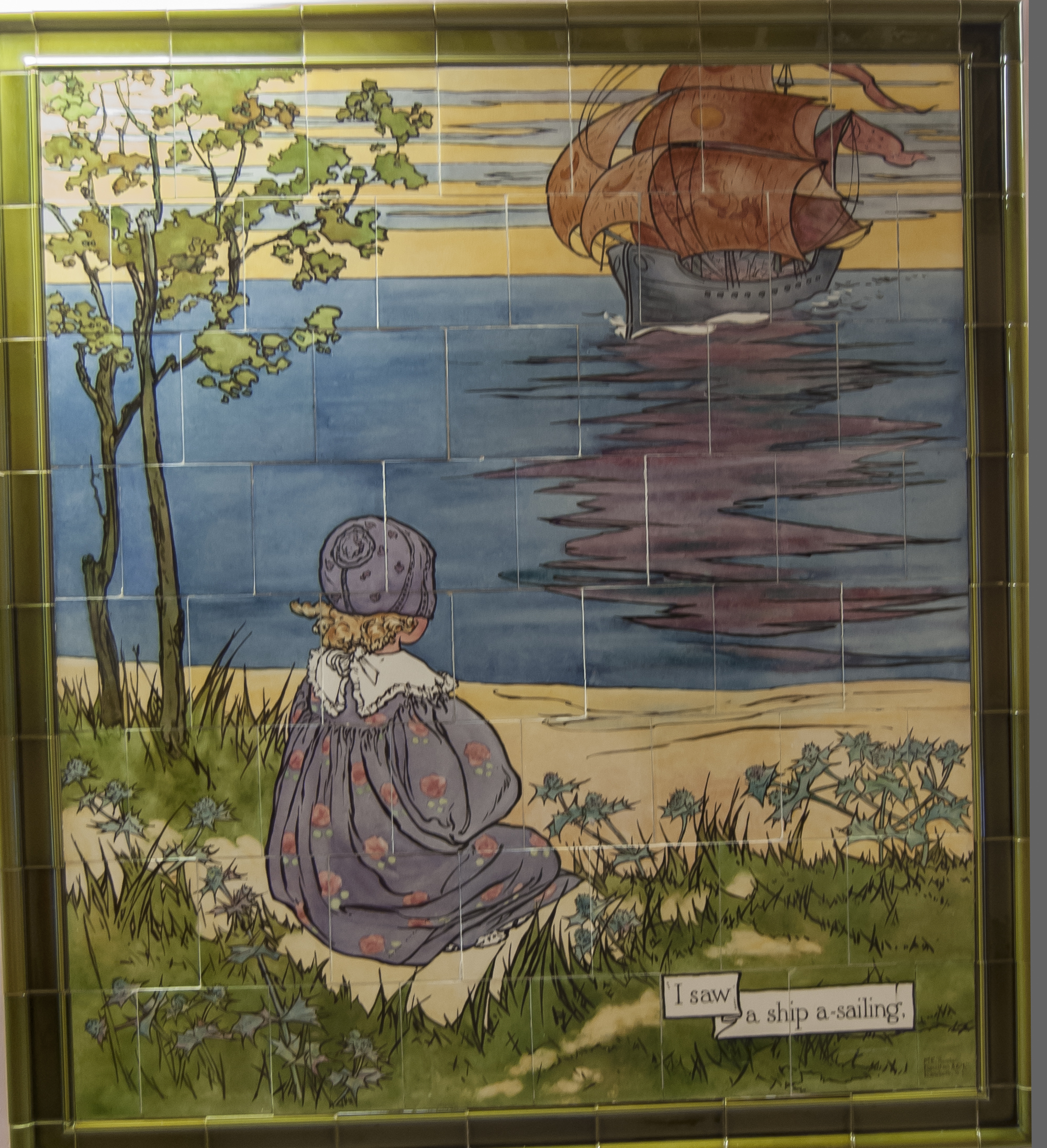
Conquest Hospital

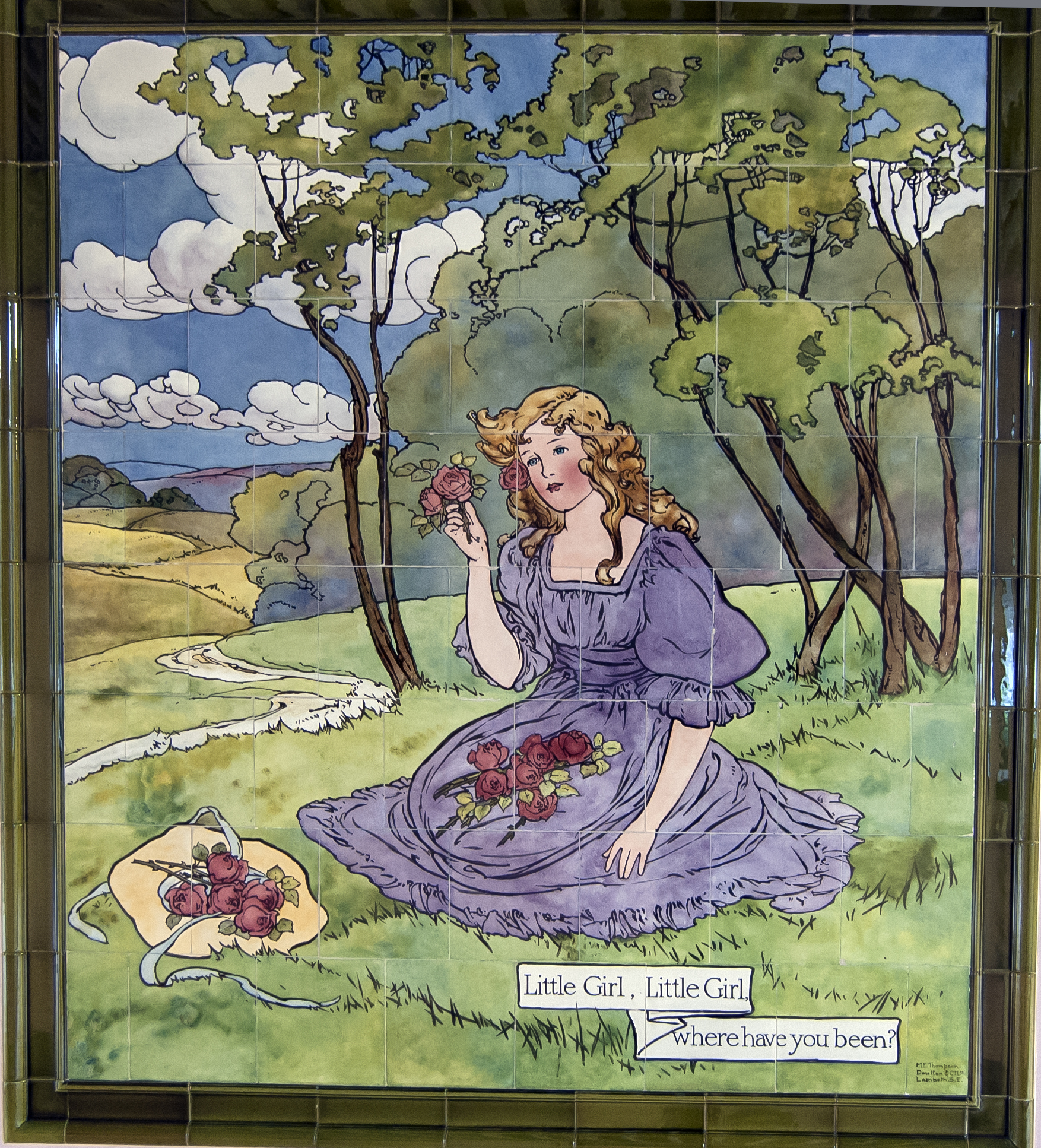
Conquest Hospital

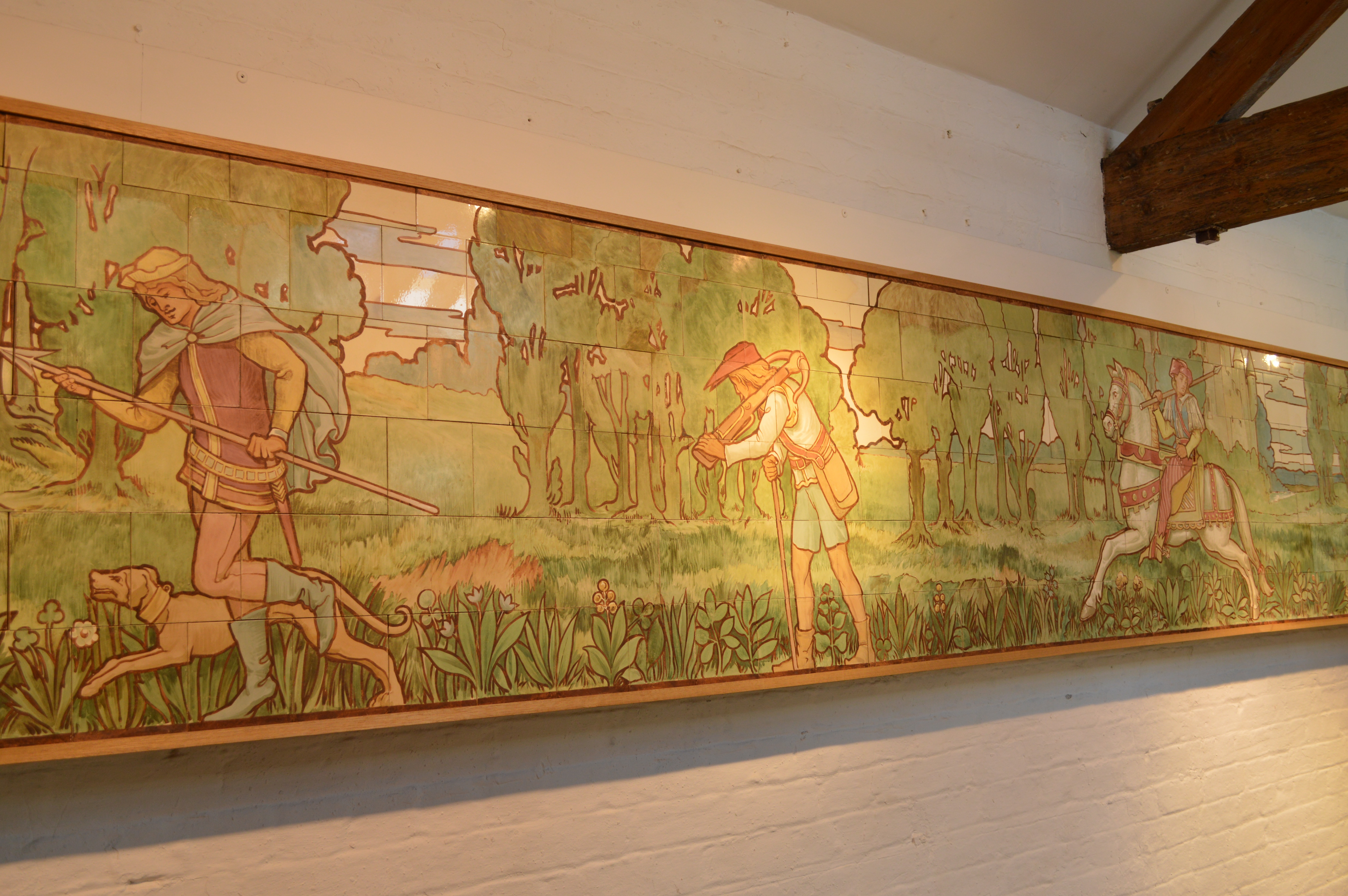
Charing Cross Hospital

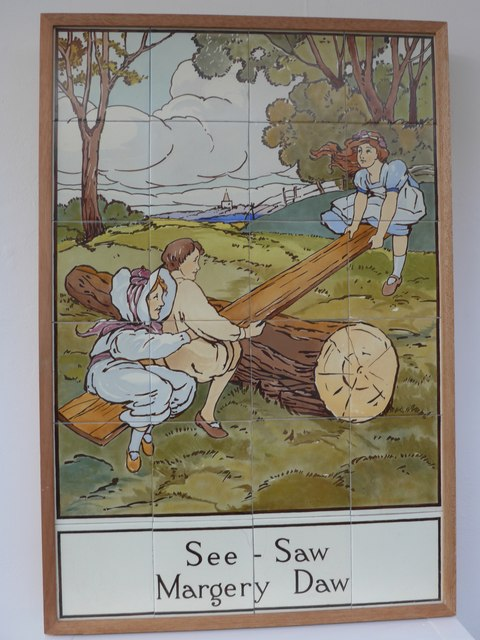
Havant Hospital
