= Douglas Hubble =

British paediatric endocrinologist (1900–1981)

Professor Sir Douglas Hubble KBE FRCP
- Born: 25 December 1900; Bournemouth, England
- Died: 6 November 1981 (aged 80)
- Education: St Bartholomew's Hospital, University of London
- Awards: KBE, FRCP, James Spence Medal
- Scientific career
- Fields: Pediatric endocrinology
- Workplaces: University of Birmingham, Derbyshire Children's Hospital, Derbyshire Royal Infirmary, Derby City Hospital, Haile Selassie I University

Sir Douglas Vernon Hubble (25 December 1900 – 6 November 1981) was an English paediatric endocrinologist, general practitioner, and professor of paediatrics and dean of medicine at the University of Birmingham. Hubble was principally notable for research into paediatric endocrinology and publishing a number of papers on the subject, which gave him a national reputation.

== Life and career ==
Hubble was born on 25 December 1900 to Harry Edward Hubble and Agnes Kate (née Field). He graduated from St Bartholomew's Hospital Medical College, qualifying with the Conjoint in 1924, and receiving the MBBS in 1926. He began his career as a general practitioner in Derby and joined Derbyshire Children's Hospital as a consultant in 1932, and obtaining the MD in 1934. He developed an interest in paediatric endocrinology, and gained a national reputation for his expertise after publishing numerous articles in the field. He worked simultaneously as a general practitioner and a specialist paediatrician until 1942, when he was appointed as a physician to the Derbyshire Royal Infirmary and Derby City Hospital. He resigned from general practice in 1948 following the formation of the National Health Service. In 1950 he gained membership of the Royal College of Physicians and became a Fellow of the Royal College of Physicians in 1954. He later joined the University of Birmingham Medical School in 1958 as the chair of paediatrics, and worked principally on the development of the Institute of Child Health. He became Public Orator of the university, and later became dean of the Faculty of Medicine in 1963. He was forced to retire from Birmingham in 1968, 3 years beyond his retiring age, but moved to Ethiopia to become the dean of the Faculty of Medicine at Addis Ababa University.

Hubble returned to England upon his retirement and settled in Newbury, Berkshire. He became deaf late in life and died from multiple myeloma on 6 November 1981 in Edinburgh.

== Honours ==
Hubble was appointed Commander of the Order of the British Empire (CBE) in 1966 and Knight Commander of the Order of the British Empire (KBE) in 1971. He was awarded the James Spence Medal, the highest honour of the Royal College of Paediatrics and Child Health, in 1970; he also received the British Medical Association's Dawson Williams Prize. He was appointed Fellow of the Royal College of Physicians in 1954.
