= Southland Hospital =

Hospital in New Zealand

- Te Whatu Ora (Health New Zealand)
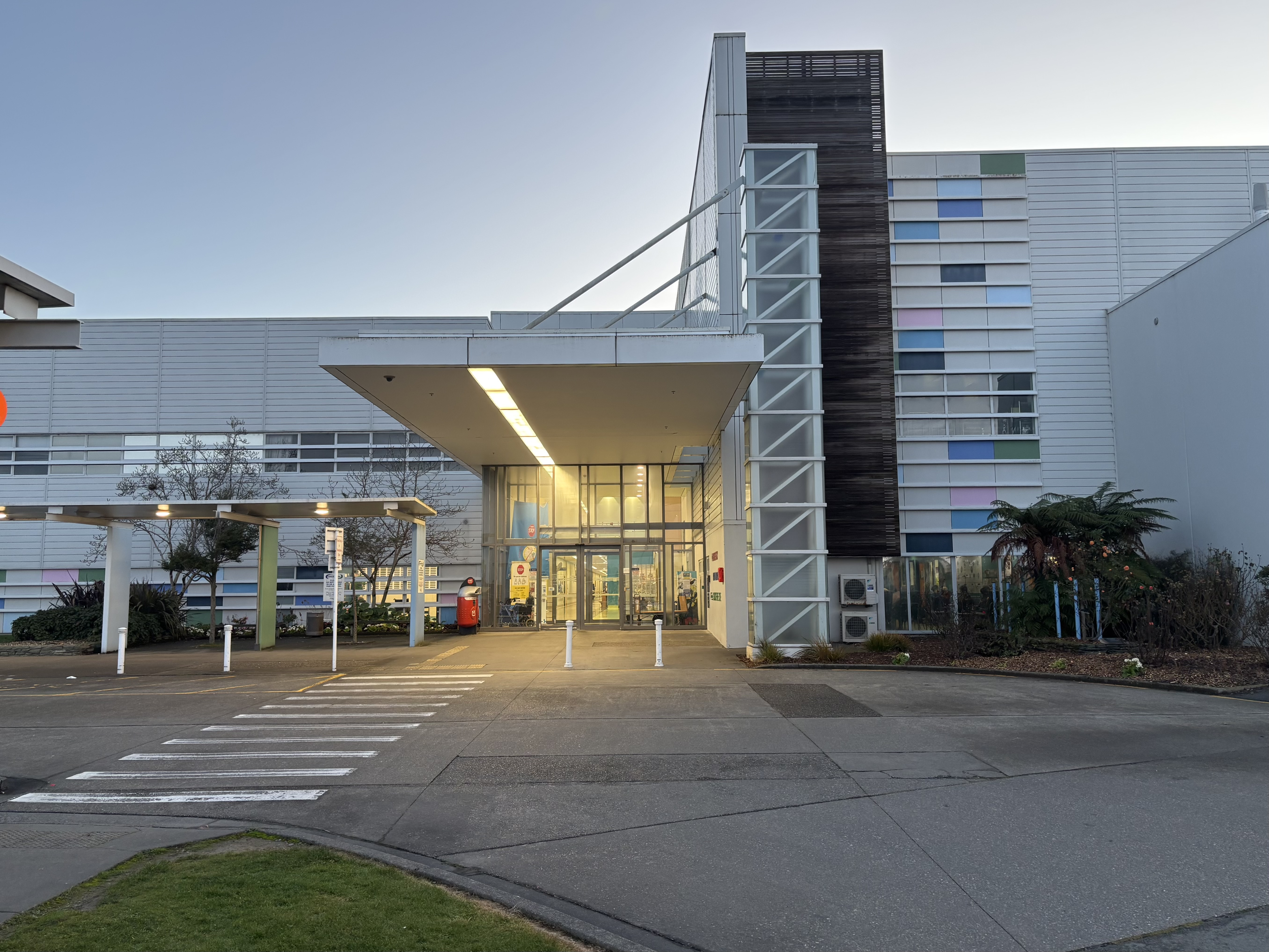
- The lobby of the Southland Hospital

Geography
- Location: Southland, New Zealand
- Coordinates: 46°26′15″S 168°21′31″E

Organisation
- Type: District General
- Affiliated university: University of Otago (for medical training)

Helipads
- Helipad: Yes

History
- Constructed: 2002
- Opened: 2004

Links
- Lists: Hospitals in New Zealand

Southland Hospital is a public hospital located in Invercargill, New Zealand. It is operated by Te Whatu Ora and serves the Southland and Otago regions. The hospital opened in 2004, replacing the former Kew Hospital on the same site. It is affiliated with the University of Otago for medical training and functions as a secondary-level hospital providing emergency, surgical, medical, and outpatient services.

The hospital serves a population catchment of approximately 130,000 people across Southland and parts of Otago. It is located in the suburb of Kew and has approximately 168 beds. It provides healthcare services to communities across Southland and parts of Otago, including rural and remote areas.

== History ==
=== Dee Street Hospital ===
Formal hospital services in Invercargill began with the establishment of Dee Street Hospital in 1863. The institution operated under several names and underwent multiple expansions during its existence. As Invercargill’s population grew and healthcare practices evolved, the limitations of the original facilities became increasingly apparent.

The former Dee Street Hospital buildings continued to serve healthcare functions into the twentieth century before being replaced by newer facilities.

=== Kew Hospital ===
Kew Hospital officially opened in 1937 on the current Southland Hospital site in Kew suburb. The hospital became the principal acute-care hospital for the Southland region and underwent a number of expansions and renovations during the twentieth century.

By the late 1990s, reports identified concerns regarding the ageing infrastructure of the hospital buildings, including seismic strengthening requirements and limitations in adapting the facilities to contemporary healthcare standards.

=== Redevelopment and new hospital ===
Planning for a replacement hospital began in the early 2000s, with redevelopment approved in 2002. Construction of the new Southland Hospital was completed in 2004. Hospital services were progressively transferred from the former Kew Hospital buildings into the new facility later that year.

Following the opening of the new hospital, most of the former Kew Hospital buildings were demolished, although some historic structures on the site were retained. Historic ceramic picture tiles of nursery rhymes and Aesop's fables, made by H. & G. Thynne in Hereford, England, which decorated the children's ward of Kew Hospital from 1937 were removed in 1978 and stored until being reinstalled in Southland Hospital in 2006 and 2008.

== Facilities and Services ==
=== Accident and emergency department ===
Southland Hospital operates a 24-hour emergency department serving Southland and surrounding districts. The hospital provides emergency medical care, trauma stabilisation, and acute inpatient services.

Under the South Island major trauma system, some critically injured patients transported by helicopter may instead be transferred directly to larger tertiary hospitals such as Christchurch Hospital or Dunedin Hospital.

=== Surgical and medical services ===
The hospital provides a range of inpatient and outpatient medical and surgical services, including general medicine, surgery, maternity care, diagnostic imaging, and specialist clinics. Facilities include CT and MRI imaging services and operating theatres.

Southland Hospital functions as the principal secondary-level hospital for the Southland region and receives referrals from smaller healthcare facilities across the region.

=== Teaching affiliation ===
Southland Hospital is affiliated with the University of Otago and serves as a teaching site for medical students and trainee doctors. The hospital also supports nursing education in partnership with the Southern Institute of Technology.

== Administration ==
=== Southern DHB ===
Prior to 2022, Southland Hospital was administered by the Southern District Health Board (Southern DHB), which was formed through the merger of the Otago and Southland district health boards.

=== Te Whatu Ora transition ===
In 2022, New Zealand’s district health boards were dissolved as part of a national health system restructuring. Responsibility for Southland Hospital was transferred to Te Whatu Ora, under the Te Waipounamu regional division covering the South Island.

== Capacity and Infrastructure ==
During the 2020s, reports by health authorities and media organisations identified capacity pressures at Southland Hospital, particularly within the emergency department and surgical services. Concerns included increasing patient demand, infrastructure limitations, and delays for some elective procedures.

Redevelopment proposals and upgrades for emergency department and operating theatre facilities have been considered as part of longer-term planning for the hospital campus.
