= Dee Street Hospital =

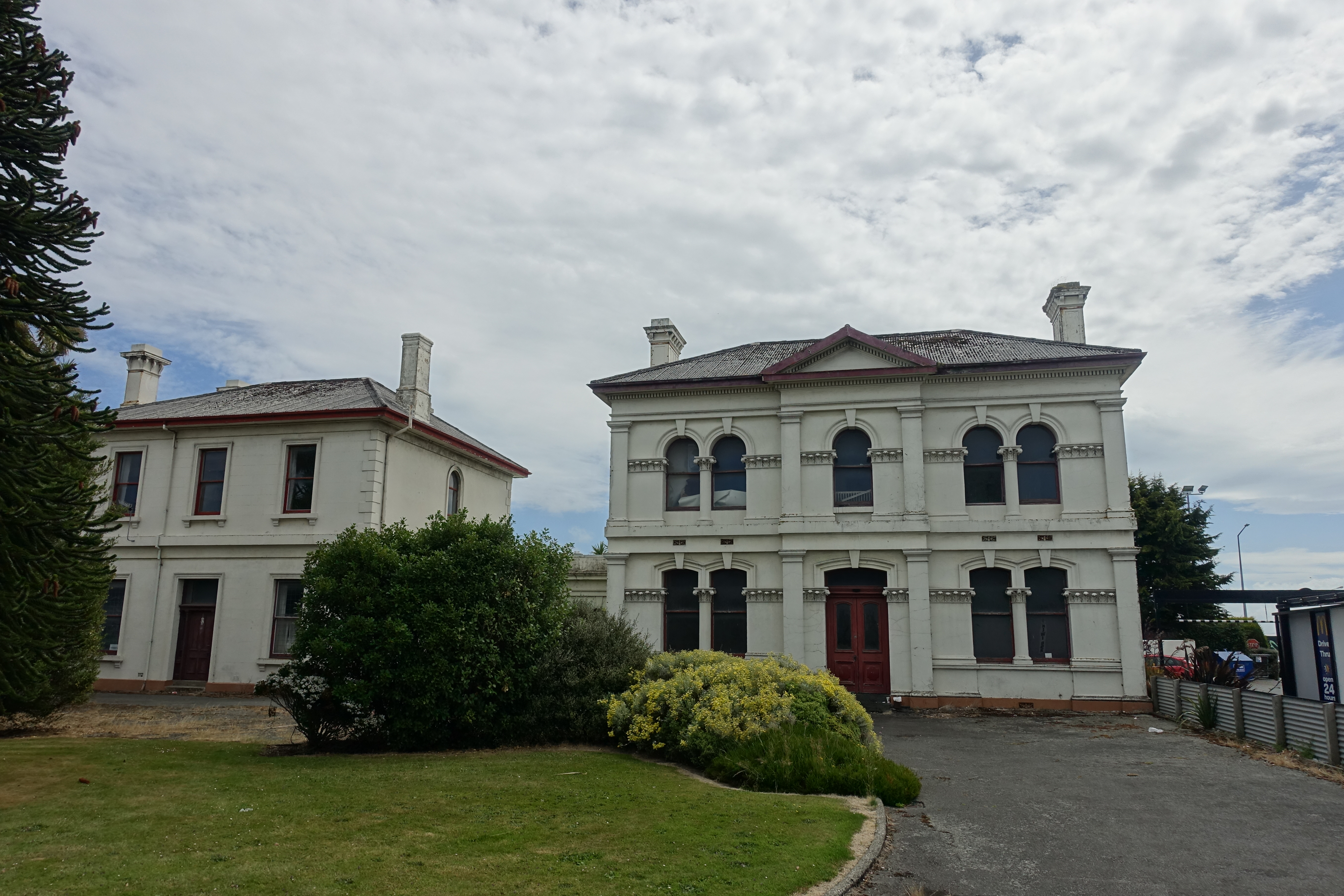

Geography
- Location: Southland, New Zealand

History
- Former names: Queen Victoria Hospital; Dee Street Maternity Hospital
- Opened: 1863
- Closed: 1979

Links
- Lists: Hospitals in New Zealand

Dee Street Hospital (later known as Queen Victoria Hospital and Dee Street Maternity Hospital) was a public hospital located at 194–200 Dee Street, Invercargill, in the Southland region of New Zealand. Opened in 1863, it is identified as the site of New Zealand's oldest surviving public hospital buildings. The complex served the Southland community for over a century, transitioning from a general hospital to a dedicated maternity facility before its closure in 1979. The remaining structures, the Central Block, South Wing, and Porter's Lodge, are listed as a Category 1 Historic Place by Heritage New Zealand and represent the only extant collection of nineteenth-century hospital buildings in the country.

== Location ==
The hospital complex occupies a site bounded by Dee Street, Gala Street, Leven Street, and Victoria Avenue at the northern end of the Invercargill central business district. The original hospital reserve was established alongside Dee Street in 1862.

== History ==
=== Establishment and early development (1862–1880) ===
A Hospital Reserve was gazetted alongside Dee Street in 1862 in response to Invercargill's rapidly expanding colonial population. Construction of the first building, later designated the North Wing, began later that year, and the wing was opened in 1863 to house the hospital's wards.

In 1866, the Porter's Lodge was constructed at the south-eastern corner of the reserve, partly to accommodate a porter responsible for overseeing the main gates of the complex. This cottage is considered by some sources to be the oldest surviving public building in Invercargill.

Local architect Frederick William Burwell designed the hospital's successive building phases. He added the Central Block in 1876 and the South Wing in 1879, the latter originally serving as accommodation for the resident House Surgeon. The three main blocks were connected by internal corridors.

=== Victoria Wing and further expansion (1897–1910) ===
Following the demolition of the original North Wing, a new addition, the Victoria Wing, was constructed in 1898 to mark Queen Victoria's Diamond Jubilee of 1897. Funding was raised through a public appeal led by J.E. Watson, then Chairman of the Hospital Board; the community of Invercargill and Southland contributed more than £2,000 toward the cost, with the central government providing a matching sum.

A stand-alone Nurses' Home was added to the site in 1905, providing residential accommodation for nursing staff. Further outpatient and surgical facilities were developed between approximately 1902 and 1910 to address growing demand.

=== Transfer of acute services to Kew Hospital (1937) ===
By the early twentieth century, the hospital's city-centre location had become a constraint on expansion. Plans for a larger, purpose-built regional hospital at Kew, a suburb on the outskirts of Invercargill, were developed over several decades. The new Kew Hospital opened in 1937, and primary acute care services were formally transferred from Dee Street at that time.

=== Second World War period (1939–1945) ===
In 1939, a fire broke out at the newly opened Kew Hospital, damaging the roof and upper storeys of the Inpatients' Block. This emergency required the rapid transfer of patients back to the Dee Street facility, which resumed its role as the region's primary hospital until repairs at Kew were completed in 1940. During this period, Dee Street's buildings were reroofed and strengthened to improve earthquake resistance.

Throughout the Second World War, the hospital served as a centre for military medical examinations and treatment. In 1942, the site was officially renamed Queen Victoria Hospital.

=== Transition to maternity care (1957–1979) ===
Following the opening of the West Wing at Kew Hospital in 1957, Dee Street ceased to function as a general hospital and was exclusively repurposed as a maternity facility. Known by the late 1960s as Dee Street Maternity Hospital, the facility became the primary maternity service for the Southland region during the post-war period.

Nursing education was a significant function of the maternity era. The first intake of dedicated maternity nurses began training in 1952, and approximately 250 midwives graduated from the hospital between that year and its closure in 1979.

The hospital closed in 1979 when maternity services were transferred to the new Obstetric Ward at Kew Hospital. The closure was marked by a televised transfer of mothers and infants, and a garden party was held to honour nursing staff who had trained at the site.

=== Closure and post-hospital use (1979–Present) ===
The Victoria Wing was demolished in 1985. The site it occupied was subsequently developed for commercial use, with a McDonald's restaurant constructed on the former wing's footprint.

Recognising the architectural and historical significance of the surviving structures, the Central Block and South Wing were placed under the protection of the New Zealand Historic Places Trust in 1984. The buildings were subsequently leased to the Southland Museum and Art Gallery Trust in 1988.

The Porter's Lodge was repurposed for a period as the local Citizens Advice Bureau, maintaining its role as a public service facility within the community.

In 2000, the South Wing, renamed Burwell House, was restored and opened as a studio residence for recipients of the William Hodges Fellowship, an artist-in-residence programme administered by the Southland Art Foundation.

== Architecture ==
The hospital complex was constructed in stages over approximately four decades and reflects the Victorian Classical architecture style prevalent in New Zealand's colonial public buildings of the period. The Central Block features decorative interior and exterior plasterwork. The site also retains the original hospital gates, masonry boundary walls, and cast-iron fencing, elements that contribute to the character of the precinct.

F.W. Burwell, whose other works include several prominent Invercargill commercial buildings, designed the Central Block and South Wing in brick construction, with internal walls lined with lath and plaster. His approach emphasised classical detailing consistent with Victorian institutional architecture.

== Heritage status ==
The former Dee Street Hospital is listed as a Category 1 Historic Place on the New Zealand Heritage List / Rārangi Kōrero, administered by Heritage New Zealand Pouhere Taonga. The entry was formalised on 8 August 2008.

Heritage New Zealand has described the remaining buildings as the only surviving collection of nineteenth-century hospital buildings in the country. The site is located within the Dee Street Historic Area, a precinct identified in Invercargill City Council heritage assessments as being of high townscape and architectural value.

== Conservation and future use ==
In 2024, the Troopers Memorial Corner Charitable Trust acquired the former hospital property for $160,500. The Trust announced plans for a phased restoration programme, beginning with the clearance of overgrown vegetation and stabilisation of the structures against earthquake risks. Proposed future uses included medical, childcare, office, and hospitality facilities.
