= Ballamona Hospital =

Psychiatric hospital in Braddan, Isle of Man

Coordinates: 54.174°N 4.508°W

Ballamona Hospital was an asylum located in Braddan, Isle of Man. It was known as the Isle of Man Lunatic Asylum until 1934 when it became the Isle of Man Mental Hospital. From 1955 it was known as Ballamona Hospital.

It was built in 1868, then called the Mental Hospital, and 76 patients were admitted. The hospital was added to in the 1880s and picture tiles designed by Walter Crane and manufactured by Maw & Co. were installed in the part of the hospital which later became the School of Nursing. The tiles depicted nursery rhymes and the ancient elements Terra, Aqua, Ignis and Zephyria (earth, water, fire and wind).

In 1925 there were 254 patients at the hospital with a further 65 at the nearby Home for the Poor. In 1948, there were 345 beds, and it had a farm and market gardens where patients worked. There was an annexe, Ard Aalin, for voluntary patients. It was renamed Ballamona Hospital on the establishment of the health service.

It was demolished in 1998, to make way for the new Noble's Hospital installations.
