= Havant War Memorial Hospital =

- Southern Health NHS Foundation Trust
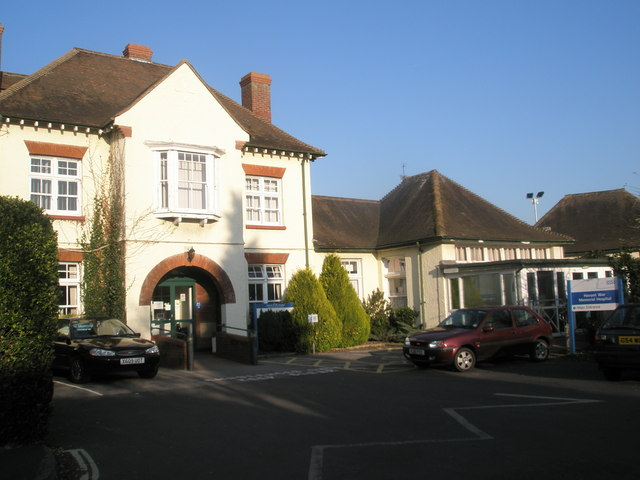
- Havant War Memorial Hospital (now a care home)

- Shown in Hampshire

Geography
- Location: Crossway, Havant, Hampshire, England, United Kingdom
- Coordinates: 50.8543°N 0.9875°W

Organisation
- Care system: Public NHS
- Type: Community

History
- Founded: 1929
- Closed: 2011

Links
- Lists: Hospitals in England

Havant War Memorial Hospital was a health facility in Crossway in Havant, Hampshire, England. It was managed by Southern Health NHS Foundation Trust.

== History ==
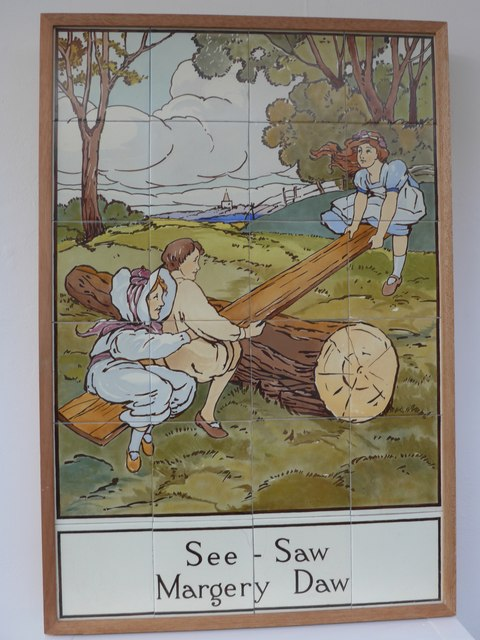
See Saw Margery Daw

Planning for the hospital, a World War I memorial began in 1919 and the foundation stone for the facility was laid by Major General John Seely, Lord Lieutenant of Hampshire, in January 1928. The building, which was designed by Vernon-Inkpen and Rogers, was opened in July 1929 with 12–14 beds. Two extensions with 15 beds were added in 1933. In 1935 a children's ward was named the Jubilee Ward to commemorate the jubilee of King George V and Queen Mary was built. It was decorated with 10 panels of Doulton tiles, designed by William Rowe, depicting nursery rhymes; each panel was made up of 24 tiles with one signed by Rowe. Another extension was built in 1939 and the hospital had 23–25 beds.

The hospital had been a voluntary hospital but joined the National Health Service in 1948 and a casualty department was added in June 1957. A proposal to close the hospital in 1968 met with resistance and in 1971 it had 25 beds. After services transferred to modern facilities such as Fareham Community Hospital, Havant War Memorial Hospital closed in September 2011 and was subsequently converted for use as a care home. As of 2013 the nursery rhyme tiles had been preserved.

=== Replacement ===
An 80 bed replacement hospital at the old Oak park school site was agreed and planning permission accepted by Havant Borough Council in 2010 but in the event was shelved, the site remaining empty, though a small Oak Park Clinic (Note: As of 2021 Oak Park clinic is under the stewardship of Portsmouth Hospitals University NHS Trust) day services scheme did go ahead to provide day services.
