= Kew Hospital =

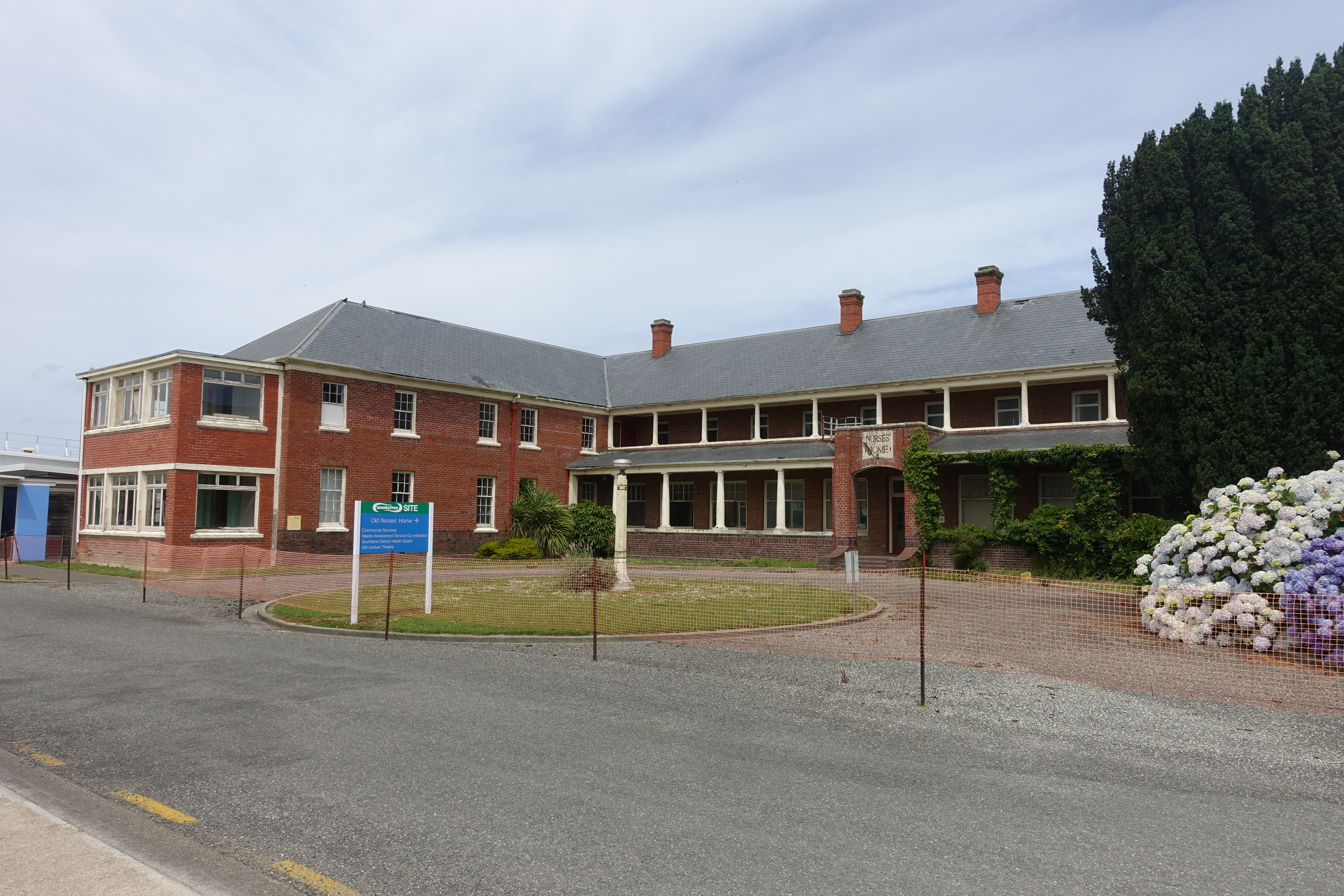

Geography
- Location: 75 Kew Road, Kew, Invercargill, Southland, New Zealand

History
- Founded: 1935
- Opened: 1937
- Closed: 2004
- Demolished: 2011 (Partially)

Links
- Lists: Hospitals in New Zealand

Kew Hospital was a public general hospital located at Kew Road in the suburb of Kew, Invercargill, New Zealand. Officially opened in 1937 on the current Kew site, the facility was officially known as Southland Hospital and served as the primary acute care institution for the Southland region for approximately 67 years. During this time, it functioned as the hub for various medical specialties, including surgical, medical, and maternity services. Architecturally, the complex was characterised by its Neo-Georgian style, red-brick masonry, and Welsh slate roofs. The hospital was eventually superseded by the Southland Hospital, which opened on the same site in 2004. Several structures from the original 1937 complex were retained following partial demolition and are recognised as Category 1 Historic Places by Heritage New Zealand Pouhere Taonga.

== Background and predecessor ==
The initial formal healthcare provision in Invercargill began with the establishment of the Dee Street Hospital in 1863. As the population expanded and medical practices evolved, the limitations of the older Dee Street premises became apparent, leading to the planning and development of a new hospital complex. The hospital was first proposed in 1918 and completed in 1937.

=== Early use of the Kew site ===
The choice of Kew as the site for a future base hospital followed an established pattern of using peripheral land for infectious disease management. In 1907, a Fever Ward was established at Kew, then at a considerable distance from the Invercargill city centre, associating the site with clinical use. The 1918 influenza pandemic, known in New Zealand as Black November, further catalysed the decision that year to develop a new hospital at Kew. By 1922, the Southland Hospital Board reported that the Kew estate had been "roaded, drained, fenced, and laid out on modern lines" for the erection of a new general hospital.

== Planning and design ==
The planning process bridged two decades, coinciding with the Great Depression and the First Labour Government's implementation of universal social security and health reform. The project involved significant negotiation between the Southland Hospital Board, local architects, and the Ministry of Health.

The architect appointed to the project was Edmund Richardson Fitz Wilson. Wilson's portfolio included civic, religious, and domestic structures, among them Invercargill's Civic Theatre and Town Hall and St John's Anglican Church. His vision for Kew Hospital underwent considerable evolution between 1918 and 1935. The final design was a Neo-Georgian complex that departed from that of his earlier Edwardian Baroque works in favour of a more institutional appearance, a choice influenced by the scale of the site and the constraints of the interwar economy. In 1933, the construction contract was awarded to the Dunedin firm William McLellan Ltd.

== Establishment and opening ==
The new facility, commonly known as Kew Hospital, was officially opened by the Hon. Peter Fraser, then serving as Minister of Health, on 31 March 1937.

The original 1937 complex comprised three main buildings, unified by their red-brick construction and Welsh slate roofs set at steep 45-degree pitches. These included the Administration Building, positioned centrally as the formal entry point; the Nurses' Home, located to the east with recessed balconies and a more informal residential character; and the Inpatients' Block (Wards 1–6) to the west, a functional structure designed for clinical efficiency. Ancillary buildings, kitchens, workshops, and a boiler house, were located to the rear, connected by a central corridor system. The complex was set well back from Kew Road to allow for future expansion.

A group of children called the Little Southlanders raised £220 for 38 tiles of nursery rhymes and Aesop's fables to decorate the children's ward. The tiles were designed and manufactured by H. & G. Thynne of Hereford, England. When the children's ward closed in 1978 the tiles were put into storage until they were reinstalled in Southland Hospital in 2006 and 2008.

In 1937, the newly built Kew Hospital began to take over from Dee Street, and staff and patients gradually shifted across town. Yet Dee Street remained open. When a fire broke out at Kew in 1939, patients were moved back to Dee Street, which resumed operations.

== Operational history ==
=== 1939 Fire ===
Just two years after its official opening, the hospital sustained significant damage when a fire broke out on 1 August 1939 in the roof of the Inpatients' Block. Hospital staff evacuated all patients without recorded fatalities. Because Kew was the primary acute facility, its temporary loss severely impacted regional acute care capacity. The defunct Dee Street Hospital was immediately reactivated as the main hospital, with acute patients transferred there, infirmary patients relocated to older closed buildings, and some patients transferred to Lorne Hospital in Lorneville, which functioned as an orphanage, rest home, and infirmary for elderly men.

The subsequent reconstruction included modernisation. The Hospital Board reroofed the Inpatients' Block. The reconstruction also included seismic strengthening, reflecting an early recognition of the region's geological risks that would later become a primary factor in the decision to replace the buildings.

=== Expansion and specialisation ===
Throughout its operational lifespan, the hospital underwent expansions and renovations to accommodate increasing patient numbers, introduce new medical technologies, and adapt to changing healthcare needs.

After the creation of the West Wing at Kew Hospital in 1957, Dee Street became solely a centre for maternity services. This expansion broadened Kew's capacity for general medical and surgical services, allowing the older Dee Street premises to be progressively stood down from general care.

Dee Street finally closed in 1979 with the introduction of Kew's Obstetric Ward. The transfer of maternity services to Kew ended Invercargill's dual-hospital era and established Kew as the sole public acute-care facility for Southland.

=== Decline and replacement ===
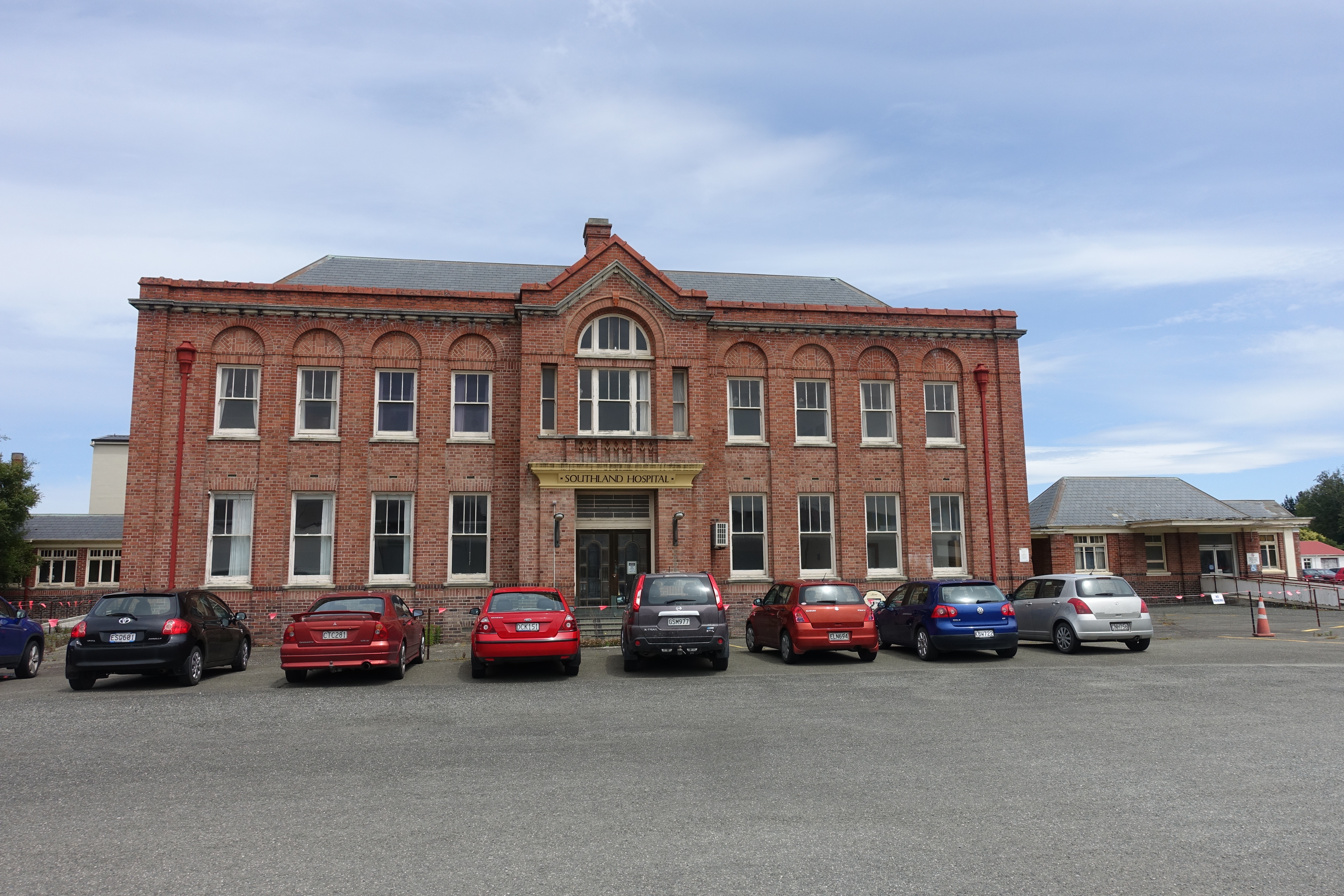
Former Southland Hospital building

By the late twentieth century, despite ongoing upgrades, the original 1937 Kew site's ageing infrastructure was identified as requiring fundamental replacement due to structural limitations and the cost implications of seismic strengthening. Three principal problems were identified by health officials: the hospital's successive additions had produced a long east–west corridor layout that was poorly suited to modern patient-centred care models; the unreinforced masonry construction of the 1930s buildings posed significant seismic risk; and ageing heating systems, outdated plumbing, and the presence of asbestos from the 1939 reroofing made ongoing maintenance costly.

Approval for a NZ$69.7 million redevelopment project was granted in July 2002. Construction of the new Southland Hospital resulted in a 168-bed secondary-level base facility, designed to comply with modern seismic standards and clinical requirements. The new hospital was completed and officially opened in August 2004, including a formal blessing ceremony.

At the opening of the new facility, then Minister of Health Annette King noted that the former Kew Hospital had seen successive additions over time in ways that had made the delivery of modern models of care more difficult.

== Demolition and surviving structures ==
Following the completion of the new Southland Hospital, all buildings bar the former administration and nurses' home buildings and the former obstetrics ward of the 1937 Kew complex were demolished. The retained structures were accorded heritage recognition. The Administration Building and Nurses' Home were registered as Category 1 Historic Places by Heritage New Zealand Pouhere Taonga on the New Zealand Heritage List in May 2008.

Heritage authorities have described Invercargill's retention of hospital buildings from different eras, the 1860s Dee Street complex, the 1930s Kew structures, and the 2004 Southland Hospital, as "almost certainly unique nationally," noting that most New Zealand cities have fully demolished their older hospital sites. Proposals to demolish the surviving Kew buildings in 2011–2013 met with heritage objections; resource consents were eventually considered circa 2013–14, with requirements to document and salvage building fabric.

== See also ==
- Southland Hospital
- Hospitals in New Zealand
- District Health Board
