= The Spring Arts & Heritage Centre =

Municipal building in Havant, Hampshire, England

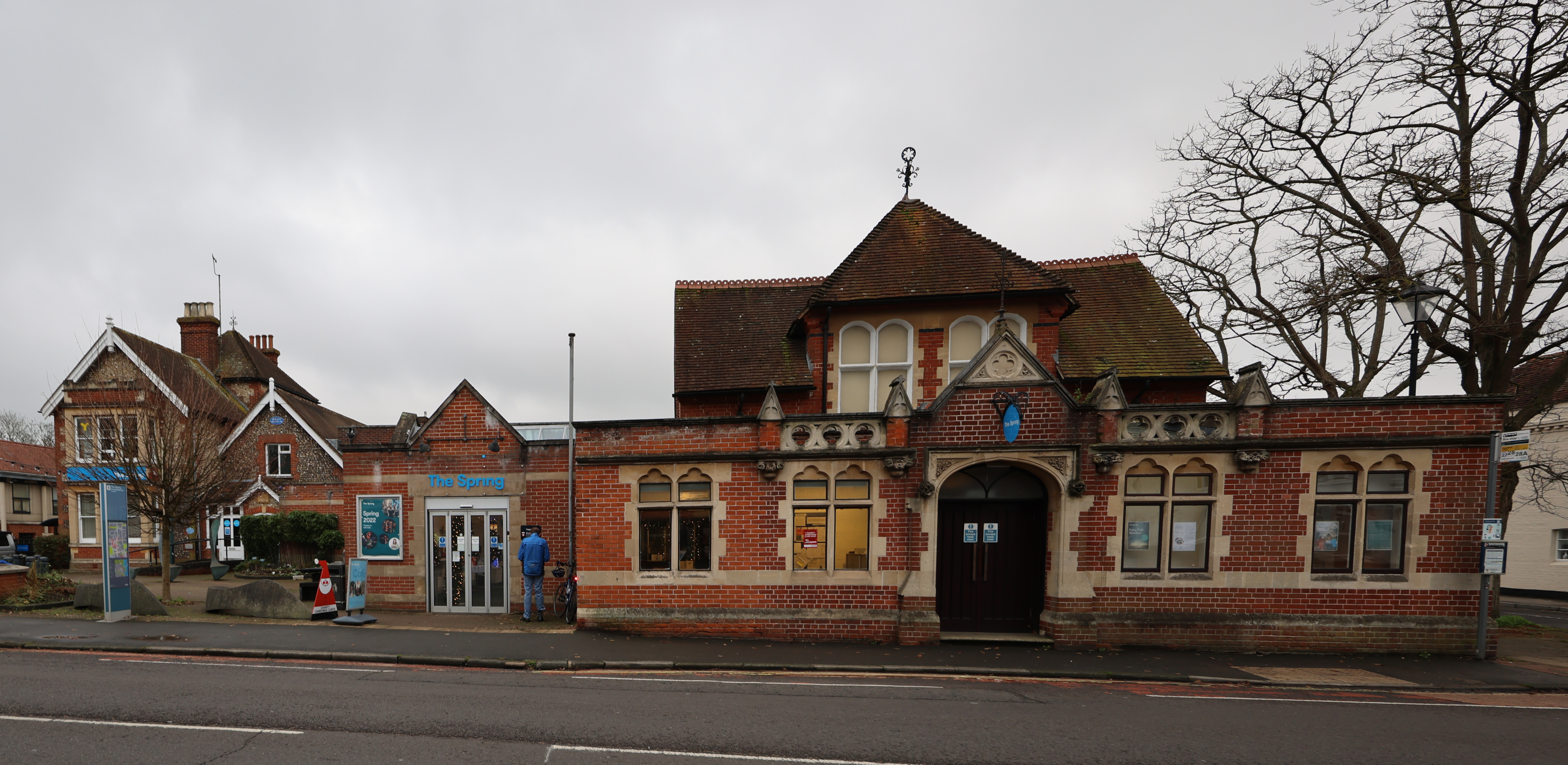
- The building in 2021

- Shown in Hampshire
- 50.8506°N 0.9784°W
- Location: High Street, Havant

History
- Built: 1870

Site notes
- Architect: Richard William Drew
- Architectural style: Gothic Revival style

The Spring Arts & Heritage Centre, formerly Havant Arts Centre and, before that, Havant Town Hall, is an arts centre in East Street, in Havant, Hampshire, England. The building served as the local town hall until it was converted for use as an arts centre in 1978.

== History ==
Following significant population growth, largely associated with the fishing industry, a local board of health was established the area in 1852. In 1868, a group of local businessmen, led by the lord of the manor, William Henry Stone of Leigh Park House, decided to form a company, to be known as The Havant Town Hall Company, to finance and commission an events venue for the area. The site they selected was open land on the south side of East Street.

The building was designed by Richard William Drew in the Gothic Revival style, built in red brick with stone dressings and was officially opened on 28 January 1870. The design involved a symmetrical main frontage of five bays facing onto East Street. The central bay featured a round headed doorway with a semi-circular fanlight, carvings in the spandrels and a pediment above containing a quatrefoil. Behind the doorway there was a tower with four round headed mullioned and transomed windows and a pyramid-shaped roof. The other bays were fenestrated by pairs of cusped and transomed windows. Above the windows there was a parapet which was broken by more quatrefoils.

The building was a town hall in the sense of being a large hall for public events rather than a council's headquarters. However, Havant Urban District Council, which succeeded the local board of health in 1894, acquired the building in 1921 and converted it into its meeting place. The adjoining house called Moorlands was bought by the council in 1946 and incorporated into the town hall complex to provide additional office space.

The town hall briefly remained a meeting place for the enlarged Borough of Havant Council which was formed in 1974. However, the council vacated the town hall in 1977, when new civic offices were opened at Civic Centre Road to the north of the town centre. Instead, the town hall was converted into an arts centre, which was officially opened on opened on 24 June 1978. The conversion created a small theatre with 135 seats, suitable for concerts and theatrical performances.

The arts centre was managed by Amanda O'Reilly from 2003 to 2012, when Sophie Fullerlove took over the role. Cheryl Pierce took charge in 2022.
