= Havant =

Town in Hampshire, England

Coordinates: 50°51′06″N 0°59′03″W

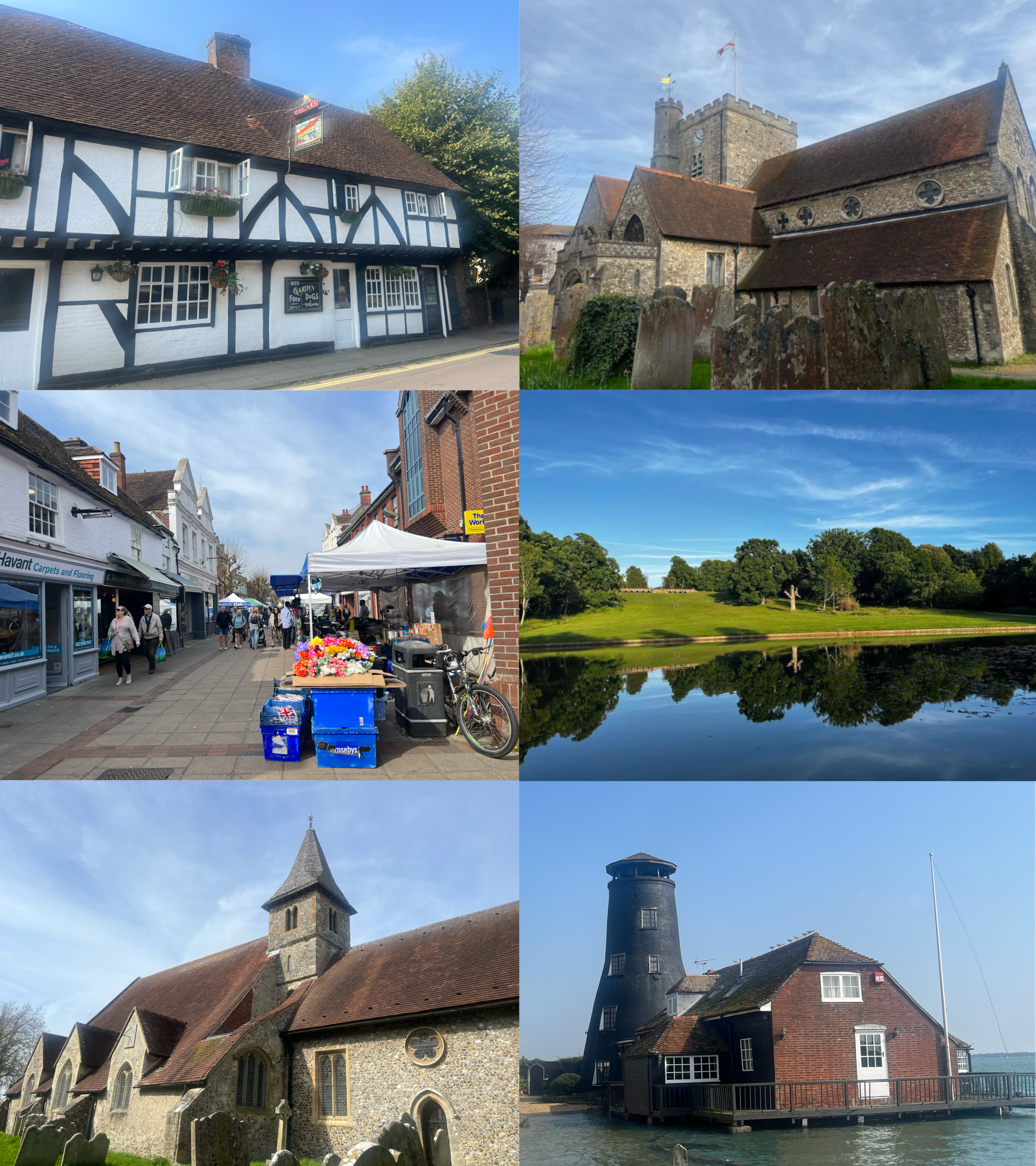
- (clockwise from top left:) The Old House at Home, St Faith’s Church, Staunton Country Park, Langstone Harbour, St Thomas à Becket Church, Warblington, and West Street.

- Location within Hampshire
- Area: 20.34 km^{2} (7.85 sq mi)
- Population: 45,826 (2011 census)
  - Density: 2,253/km^{2} (5,840/sq mi)
- OS grid reference: SU717062
- District: Havant
- Shire county: Hampshire
- Region: South East
- Country: England
- Sovereign state: United Kingdom
- Post town: HAVANT
- Postcode district: PO9
- Dialling code: 023
- Police: Hampshire and Isle of Wight
- Fire: Hampshire and Isle of Wight
- Ambulance: South Central
- UK Parliament: Havant

Havant (/ˈhævənt/ HAV-ənt) is a town in the south-east corner of Hampshire, England. Nearby places include Portsmouth to the south-west, Southampton to the west, Waterlooville to north, Chichester to the east and Hayling Island to the south. The wider borough comprises the town (45,826), the resort of Hayling Island, the town of Waterlooville, and the town of Emsworth. Housing and population more than doubled in the 20 years following World War II, a period of major conversion of land from agriculture and woodland to housing across the region following the incendiary bombing of Portsmouth and the Blitz.

The old centre of the town was a small Celtic settlement before Roman times and the town's commerce, retired and commuter population swelled after World War II so as to be usually considered economically part of the Portsmouth conurbation.

== History ==
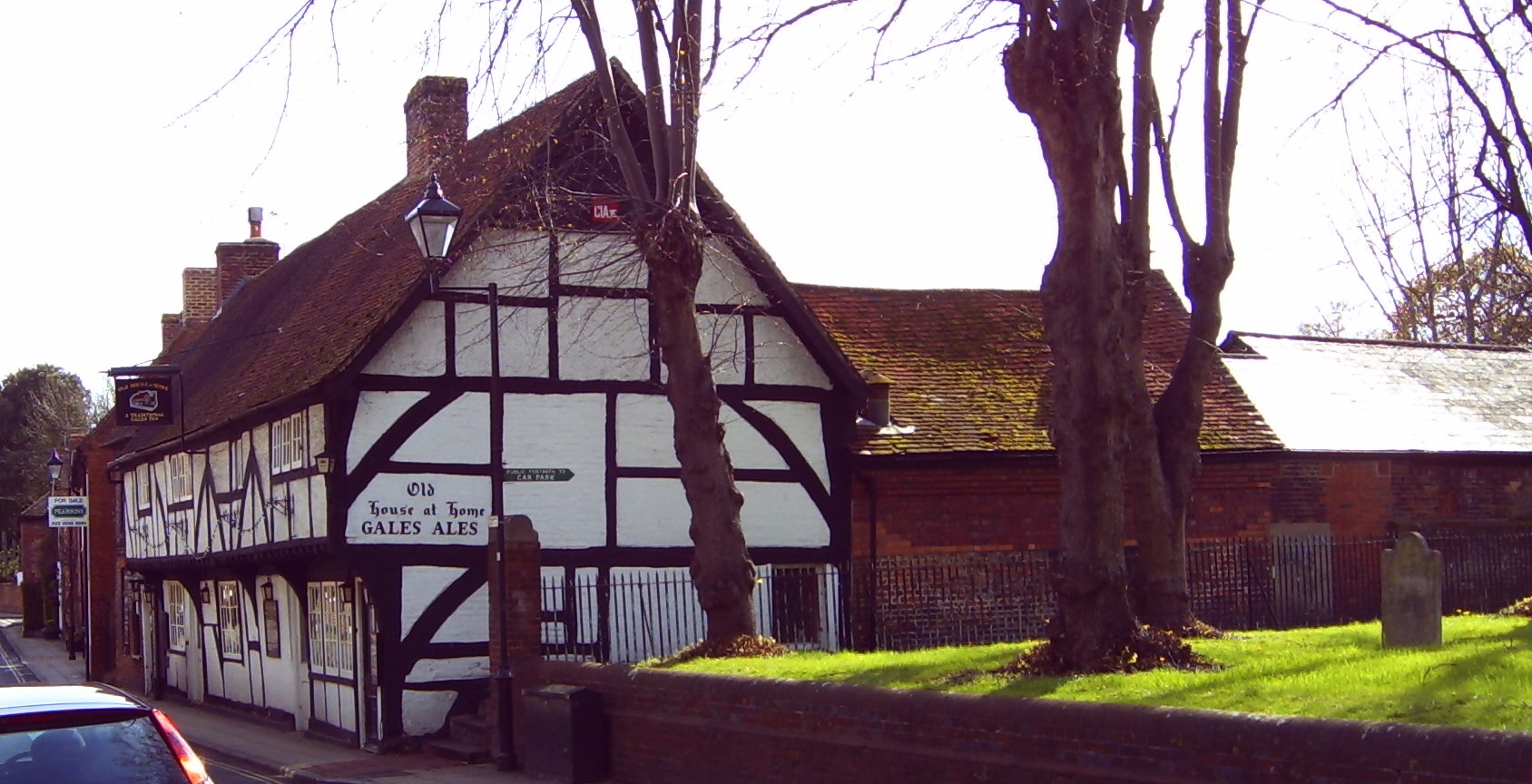
The Old House at Home. The raised grass to the right is part of St Faith's Church grounds, in the middle of town.

Archeological digs in the 19th and 20th centuries uncovered evidence of Roman buildings – near St Faith's Church and in Langstone Avenue, along with Neolithic and Mesolithic remains.

Havant was known around 935 CE as 'Hamanfunta' (the spring of Hama), referring to the spring to the south-west of St Faith's Churchyard and a settlement was made at the crossing point of tracks from the Downs to the coast and another east–west along the coast.

In 1086 (at the time of the Domesday Book), Havant was a village with a population of around 100. In 1200, the monks of Winchester Cathedral were granted the right to hold a market at Haveunte. Around 1450, an annual fair was held on the feast of Saint Faith.

For much of its history water played a vital part in local commerce, with many water mills, and parchment manufacture and brewing.

Much of Havant was destroyed by fire in 1760, leaving only the church and the adjacent late 16th or early 17th century cottages. The cottages are now known collectively as "The Old House at Home", and are used as a pub. It is claimed that the two main beams in the lounge bar were recovered from the Spanish Armada, and that the "Bear Post" within once had the last dancing bear in England tethered to it. The fire allowed widening of roads and easier passage of stagecoaches through the town: the Bear Hotel and Dolphin Hotel were notable coaching inns. In the early hours of 25 October 1784 Havant suffered a minor earthquake, and a similar event occurred on 30 November 1811.

Hall Place, on South Street is a grade II-listed house, larger than others in the four main streets. It was rebuilt in 1796 by John Butler, replacing a seventeenth-century house reputed to have been built with stone from the slighted Warblington Castle. The classically Georgian house, of buff colour bricks from Dorset, passed in the 1820s into the ownership of Mr Charles Beare Longcroft, solicitor of established civic fame, whose wife's grandfather, John Cressweller (or Crassweller), had purchased the house from John Butler in 1803 and whose family parted with it in the middle of the 20th century.

Early English in style, the oldest undisturbed parts of the church of St Faith, such as the chancel, date from the early 13th century. Some of the foundations are believed to date from Roman times. The vestry is 14th century and there is a monumental brass to William Aylward, 1413.

By 1768 Havant had its first postmaster trading from various offices until the present post office in East Street opened in 1936 (one of a handful in the UK with the cypher of King Edward VIII above the entrance). In 1976 a Royal Mail Christmas postage stamp depicted an angel design from a medieval embroidery in the Victoria and Albert Museum owned by the Victorian-established Catholic Mission in the Brockhampton neighbourhood.

In 1847 Havant was connected with a station on the railway to Portsmouth and Brighton via Chichester and this was followed by the Portsmouth Direct Line to London in 1859. The branch line to Hayling Island ran from 1867 until the mid-1960s rationalisation.

The first hospital in the town opened in 1894 in Potash Terrace as a fever hospital, closing in 1939. A war memorial hospital opened in 1929 in Crossway; in 1935 a fine frieze of Royal Doulton tiles depicting nursery rhymes was added to the children's ward.

The resident population rose in 'Havant and Waterloo Urban District' from 26,367 in 1939 to 74,552 for this direct predecessor to the borough in 1961. The rate of population increase has decreased since 1961 but population approximately doubled in the 50 years to 2011, with less cultivated land and fewer housing schemes and little non-hillside or direct coastal land available for development.

Under upcoming local government reform plans the district will be merged with nearby districts including Portsmouth to form a new South East Hampshire unitary authority in 2028.

== Geography ==
The old centre of the town is on a classic crossroad configuration, with the four streets being named North Street, East Street, South Street and West Street, and St Faith's Church at the crossing. One axis is a known Roman road and a few artefacts along the route point to the other also being so.

The major A27 road with various crossings sections off the coastal village suburbs of Langstone /ˈlæŋstən/ and the south of Bedhampton. Its north is Leigh Park, a three-ward suburb originally of council housing laid out before 1960 through the co-operation of the local and Portsmouth authorities (the other designated area being Paulsgrove occupying west Cosham), beyond which is Staunton Country Park in the South Downs National Park. To the east is Emsworth, another town which is contiguous with Havant. To the west is Portsdown Hill and part of Bedhampton. The A3(M) passes to the west.

There are several natural springs in the area, including one a short distance south-west of the church on West Street at the end of Homewell. This used to be the home of the premier parchment making facility in Southern England (closing in 1936) which later became a glove making factory and leather processing plant. The Treaty of Versailles was written on Havant parchment.

Climate data for a Rough climate of Havant
Month	Jan	Feb	Mar	Apr	May	Jun	Jul	Aug	Sep	Oct	Nov	Dec	Year
Record high °C (°F)	17 (63)	16 (61)	21 (70)	25 (77)	32 (90)	36 (97)	35 (95)	37 (99)	34 (93)	27 (81)	18 (64)	16 (61)	37 (99)
Mean daily maximum °C (°F)	8 (46)	8 (46)	11 (52)	13 (55)	17 (63)	20 (68)	23 (73)	24 (75)	19 (66)	16 (61)	11 (52)	9 (48)	15 (59)
Mean daily minimum °C (°F)	2 (36)	1 (34)	3 (37)	5 (41)	8 (46)	11 (52)	13 (55)	14 (57)	12 (54)	8 (46)	5 (41)	3 (37)	7 (45)
Record low °C (°F)	−10 (14)	−9 (16)	−8 (18)	−4 (25)	−1 (30)	2 (36)	5 (41)	6 (43)	0 (32)	−4 (25)	−6 (21)	−8 (18)	−10 (14)
Average precipitation mm (inches)	85 (3.3)	60 (2.4)	62 (2.4)	54 (2.1)	50 (2.0)	50 (2.0)	42 (1.7)	57 (2.2)	74 (2.9)	90 (3.5)	85 (3.3)	90 (3.5)	799 (31.3)
Mean monthly sunshine hours	65	85	130	200	230	235	255	230	170	125	90	60	1,875
Source: Met Office

== Demography ==
2011 Published Statistics: Population, home ownership and extracts from Physical Environment, surveyed in 2005
Output area	Homes owned outright	Owned with a loan	Socially rented	Privately rented	Other	km^{2} green spaces	km^{2} water	km^{2} roads	km^{2} domestic gardens	km^{2} domestic buildings	km^{2} non-domestic buildings	Usual residents	km^{2}
St Faith's Ward (S and Centre, Langstone)	1670	1314	435	498	52	3.96	0.03	0.64	1.20	0.29	0.30	8882	7.29
Bedhampton Ward (W)	1480	1432	403	335	42	2.00	0.08	0.49	1.07	0.26	0.06	8835	4.14
Barncroft Ward (NW Havant and N Bedhampton)	541	864	791	213	59	1.28	0.01	0.23	0.41	0.11	0.02	6518	2.12
Battins Ward (N)	528	751	1336	251	69	2.05	0.02	0.24	0.41	0.12	0.04	7062	2.95
Bondfields Ward (NE)	541	850	1224	213	52	0.50	0.01	0.27	0.32	0.15	0.14	6910	1.57
Warren Park Ward (NW)	414	670	1456	242	71	1.47	0.01	0.23	0.34	0.14	0.04	7619	2.27

== Economy ==
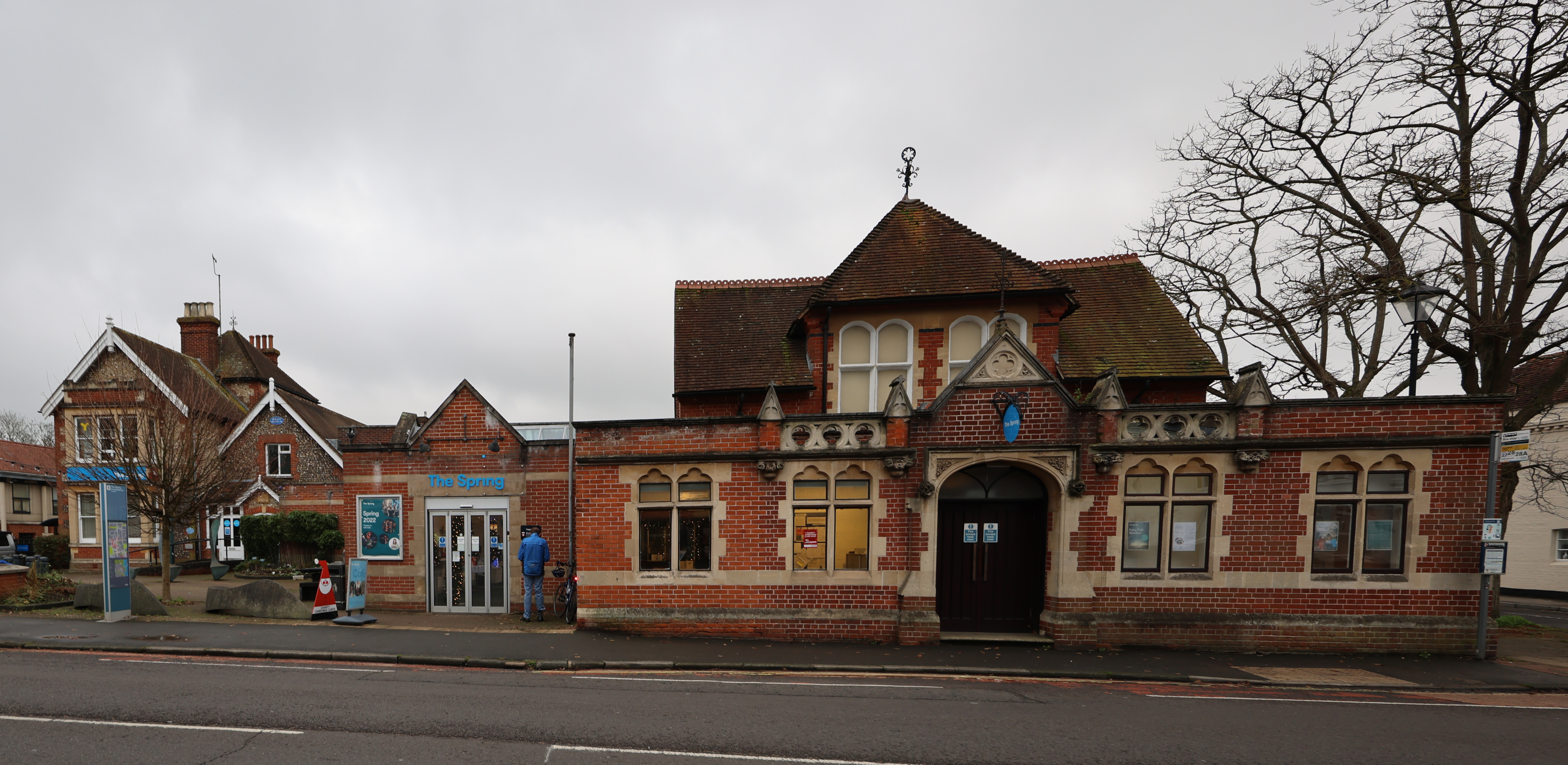
The Spring Arts & Heritage Centre

The town's commerce, retired and commuter population swelled after World War II so as to be usually considered economically part of the Portsmouth conurbation, its part closest to the Brighton-Worthing-Littlehampton conurbation, as at the 2011 census, in population, within the 20 largest conurbations in the UK.

The main shopping centre is called Meridian Shopping (formerly known as the Meridian Centre), as well as a pedestrianised section of West Street. The old town hall now houses The Spring Arts & Heritage Centre (formerly known as Havant Arts Centre). Havant is home to the local community radio station, Angel Radio which specialises in music of the pre-1960s era.

== Transport ==
The multi-bay Havant town bus station is located adjacent the Meridian Shopping Centre and 0.3 km south—west of the railway station. The primary operator is Stagecoach South with services to Portsmouth, Hayling Island, Leigh Park, Waterlooville, Petersfield, Emsworth, and Chichester. The council-run 27 route is also provided by Stagecoach South covering Emsworth, Leigh Park, and Rowlands Castle.

The railway station is on north street with the current buildings dating from 1938. It is served by direct and frequent trains to Guildford, London Waterloo, Chichester, Gatwick Airport, London Victoria, Worthing, Brighton, Portsmouth & Southsea, Portsmouth Harbour, Fareham and Southampton Central.

== Education ==
Although there had been private schools before, it was not until the Elementary Education Act 1870 that Havant gained its first state schools – one in Brockhampton Lane, followed by one in West Street and then in Fairfield Road. The town gained another school in the form of Bosmere Junior School in 1985.

In 2017 Havant College and South Downs College merged to form Havant and South Downs College.

== Sport ==
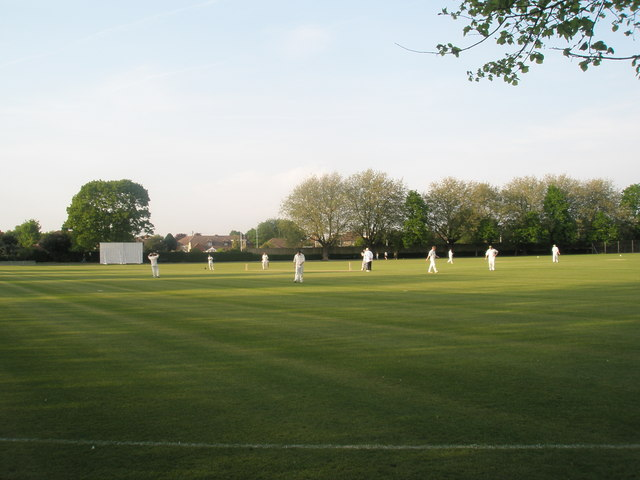
Havant Cricket Club in action at Havant Park

The town's senior non-league football side is Havant & Waterlooville F.C., On 16 January 2008 they reached the fourth round of the FA Cup for the first time in their history, beating Swansea City 4–2 in a third-round replay, setting up a 4th round match against Liverpool at Anfield, which they went on to lose 5–2 despite having led twice in the first half.

The town is represented by Havant RFC (founded 1951) for rugby and Havant HC (founded 1905) are three times winners of the English Hockey League. The latter contributed several players to the British Olympic gold medal-winning side of 1988. Havant Hockey Club also contributed two players to the 2006 Commonwealth Games in Melbourne. The astroturf was provided by the National Lottery Fund. The town has a successful amateur cricket club (founded 1876), which has attracted a number of first-class cricketers. Havant Cricket Club have won the Southern Premier Cricket League in 2000, 2002, 2007, 2008 and 2009. In 2005 Havant Cricket Club reached the semi-finals of the Cockspur Cup.

Havant is also home to a rifle and pistol club which was the training venue for a member named Malcolm Cooper who won Olympic Gold at the 1984 Los Angeles Games and the 1988 Seoul Games.

The Avenue (Tennis) Club, Havant has ten lawn tennis championship (LTC)-standard grass courts.

== Places of worship ==
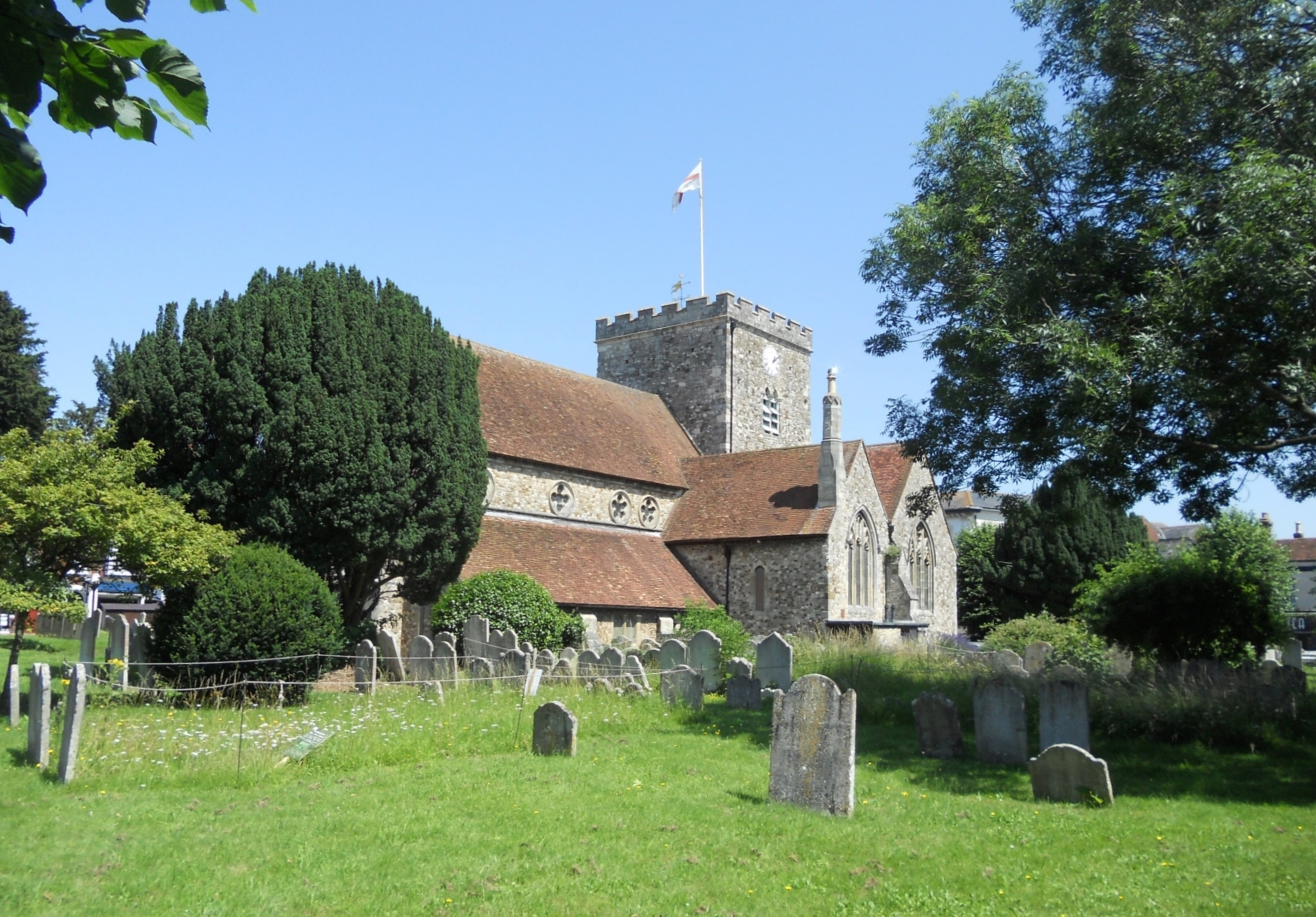
St Faith's Church

United Reformed Church in Havant

The town's Church of England church is St. Faith's, parts of which date back to the 12th century. The Roman Catholic church is St. Joseph's dating from 1875. There is also a United Reformed Church on North Street built in 1891.

== See also ==
- Havant War Memorial Hospital
