= Royal Portsmouth Hospital =

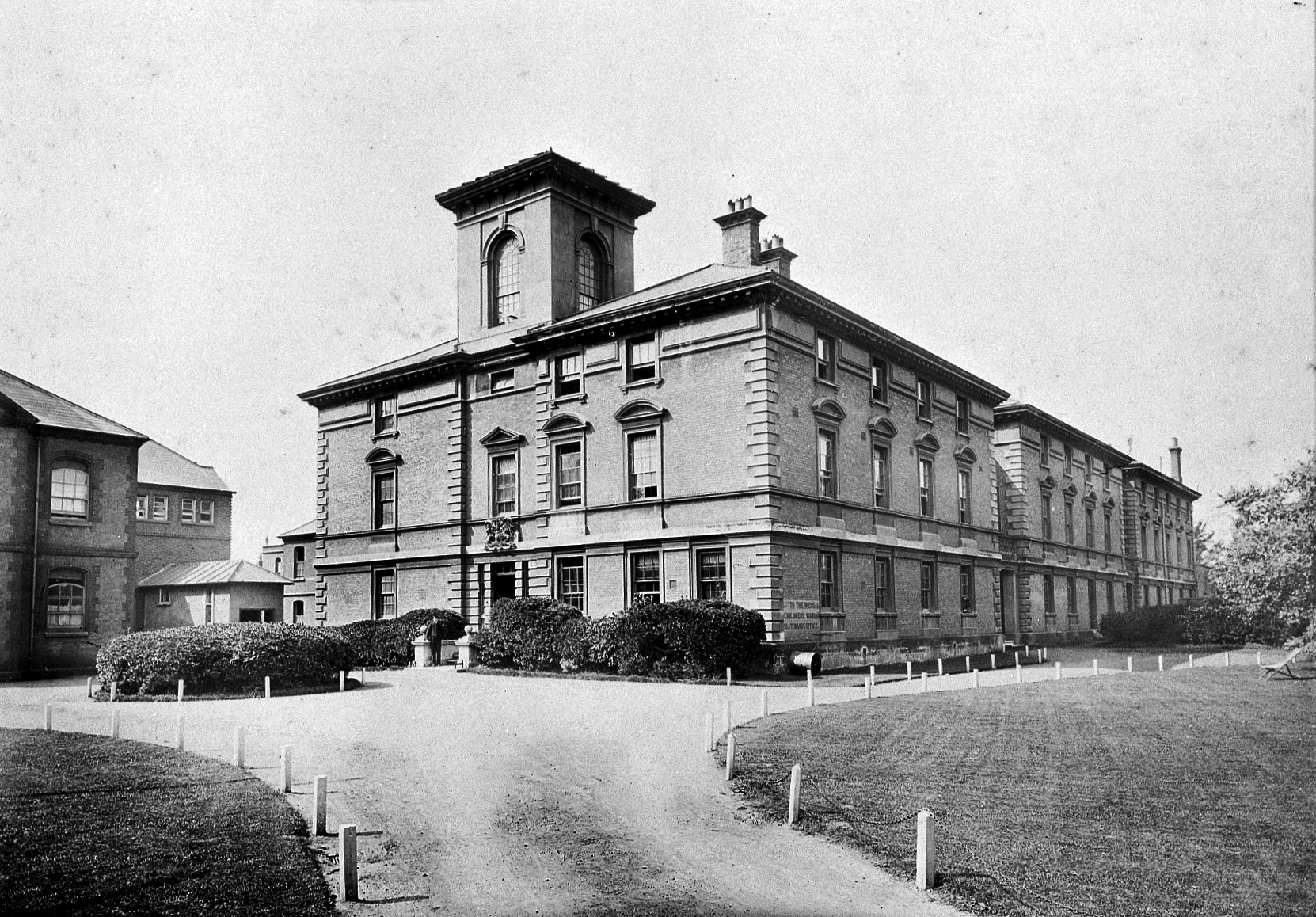
- Royal Portsmouth Hospital

- Shown in Hampshire

Geography
- Location: Portsmouth, England
- Coordinates: 50.801°N 1.089°W

Organisation
- Care system: NHS

History
- Founded: 1849
- Closed: 1979

Links
- Lists: Hospitals in England

The Royal Portsmouth Hospital in Portsmouth, England was sited in Commercial Road close to the shopping centre and near to the Portsmouth Dockyard.

== History ==
The facility had its origins as the Portsmouth and Portsea General Dispensary which was founded at St George's Square in Portsmouth in 1821. It moved to Commercial Road and opened there as the Royal Portsmouth, Portsea and Gosport Hospital in 1849. It became the Royal Portsmouth Hospital in 1866.

In the late 19th century it contained a 'Lock Ward' for the treatment of prostitutes under the regulations governed by the Contagious Diseases Acts 1863–1886. If identified as a 'common prostitute' by the Metropolitan Water Police attached to the dockyard, women would be compulsorily examined and if found to be infected they would be detained until pronounced 'clean'. Refusal of examination could mean detention for up to nine months in the hospital.

In 1908 ceramic picture tiles were installed in the Young and Edward and Mary children's wards. Designed by William Rowe and manufactured by Doulton they depicted religious scenes, nursery rhymes and fairy tales.

After services were transferred to the Queen Alexandra Hospital in Cosham, the Royal Portsmouth Hospital closed in 1979. The picture tiles were removed in 1981, restored by the Ironbridge Museum and re-sited in the Portsmouth City Museum. The former hospital was demolished and the site developed by Sainsbury's, who had a superstore there until its closure in 2021. This site was part of a larger development known as the Northern Quarter, and incorporated the site of the demolished Tricorn Centre; that project was abandoned in 2016.

== See also ==
- List of hospitals in England
