= Derbyshire Children's Hospital =

Hospital in England

Coordinates: 52.9098°N 1.5127°W

Derbyshire Children's Hospital is a children's hospital in Derby, Derbyshire in the United Kingdom. It is managed by the University Hospitals of Derby and Burton NHS Foundation Trust. It was the only entirely new children's hospital built in the UK in the twentieth century.

== History ==
The hospital was established as the Derbyshire Hospital for Sick Children in a Victorian building on North Street in 1877. Picture tiles depicting fairy tales and friezes of birds and animals which decorated the wards were removed during renovations in 1980, restored and re-installed in the mid-1980s.

The hospital joined the National Health Service in 1948 and moved to a modern building on the Royal Derby Hospital site in 1996. It was the only entirely new children's hospital built in the UK in the twentieth century.

== See also ==
- List of hospitals in England
