= Brown-Westhead, Moore & Co =

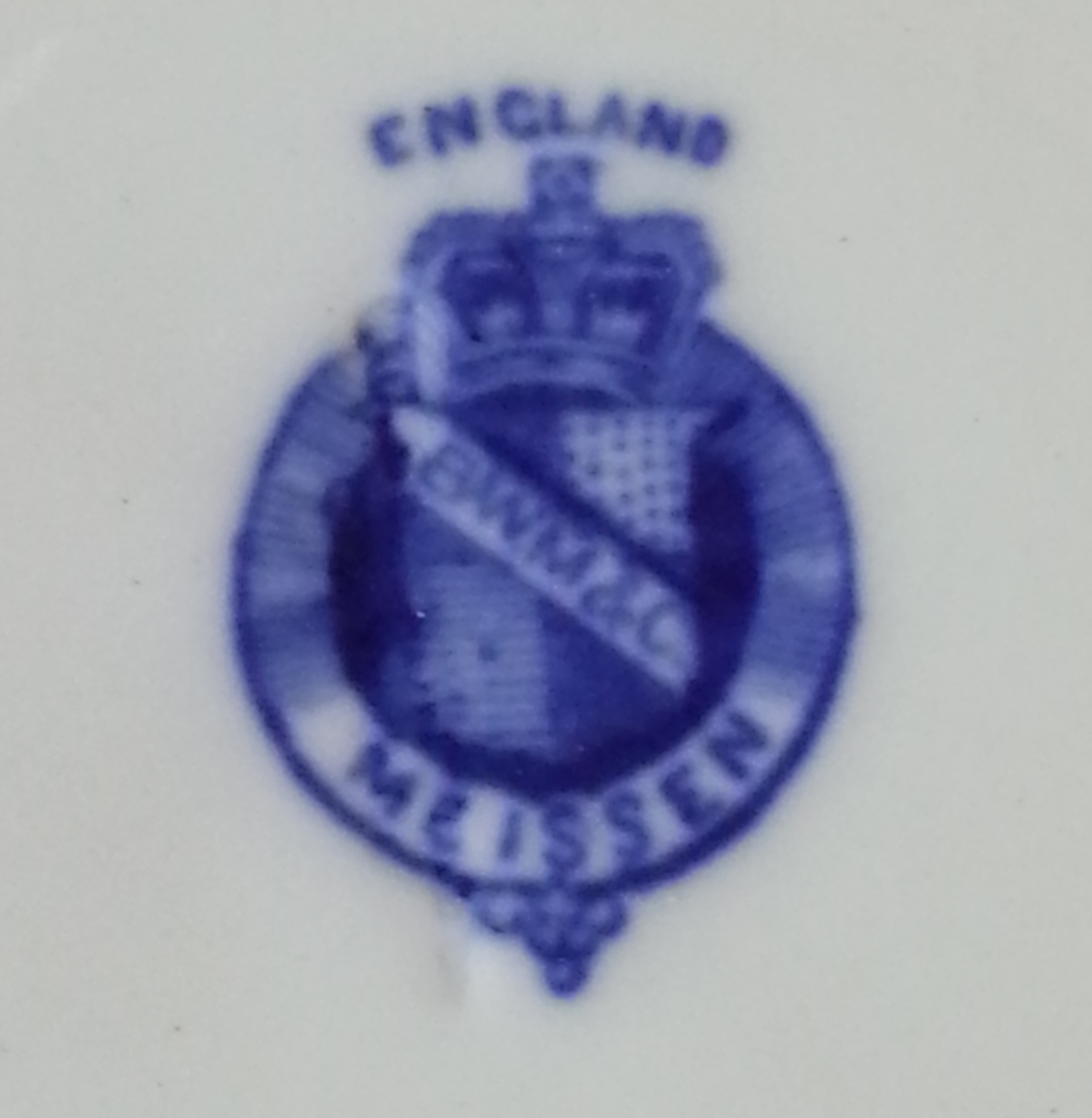
Meissen porcelain mark of BWM&C.

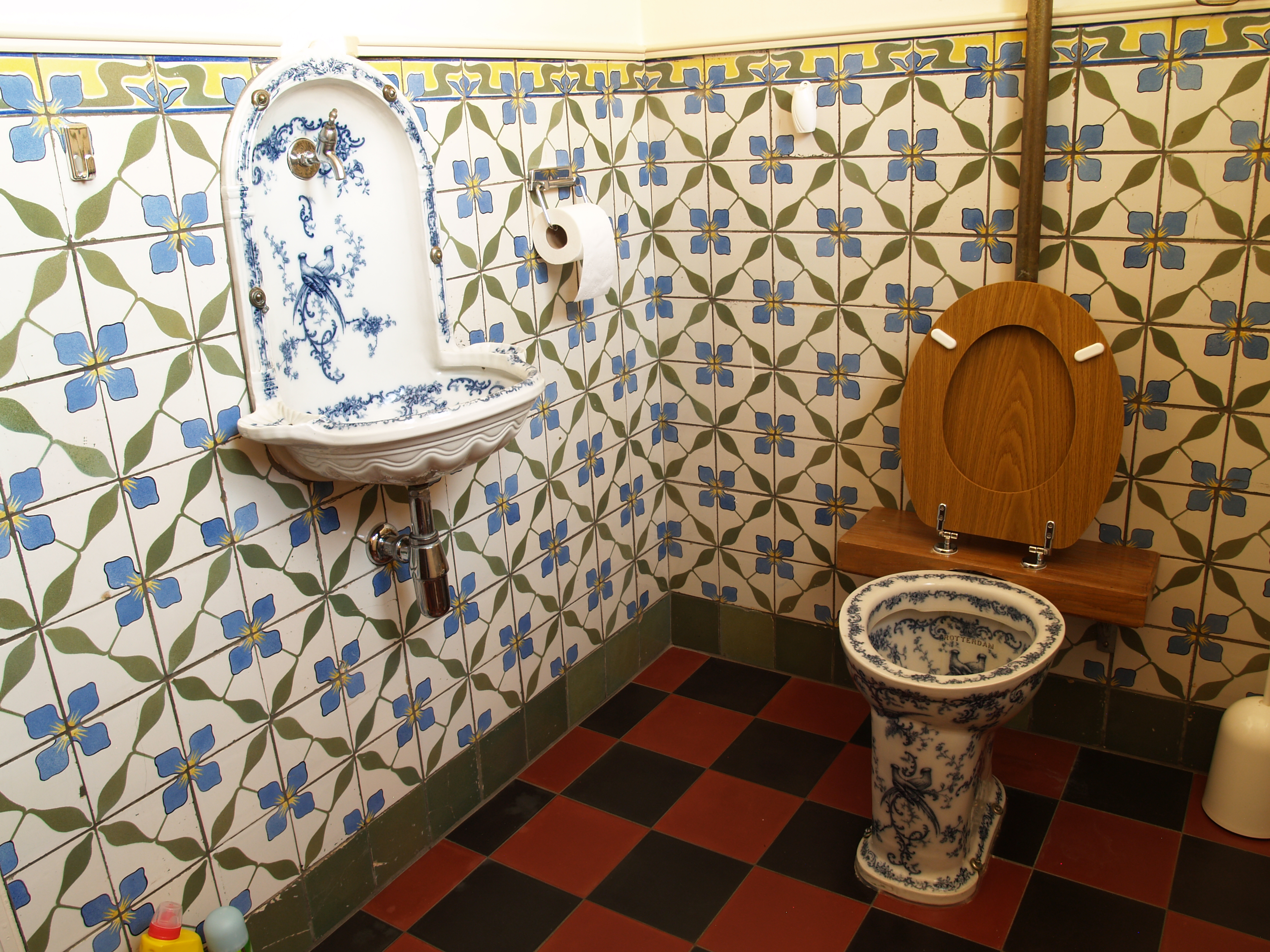
Flush toilet and sink, probably manufactured around 1900.

Messrs. Thomas C. Brown-Westhead, Moore & Co. was a manufacturer of China, earthenware, including high quality innovative Victorian majolica and sanitary goods at Cauldon Place, Stoke-upon-Trent in England from 1856.

== See also ==
- Victorian majolica
