= 2017 Special Honours =

British government recognitions

As part of the British honours system, Special Honours are issued at the monarch's pleasure at any given time. The Special Honours refer to the awards made within royal prerogative, operational honours and other honours awarded outside the New Year Honours and Birthday Honours.

== Lord Lieutenant ==
- John Rawcliffe Airey Crabtree, OBE – to be Lord-Lieutenant of and in the County of West Midlands. – 3 January 2017
- Chief Constable Julie Spence, OBE, QPM – to be Lord-Lieutenant of and in the County of Cambridgeshire. – 5 April 2017
- Lois Patricia Golding, OBE – to be Lord-Lieutenant of and in the County and City of Bristol. – 27 April 2017
- Jennifer Tolhurst – to be Lord-Lieutenant of Essex. – 22 June 2017
- Robert Voss, CBE – to be Lord-Lieutenant of the County of Hertfordshire. – 4 August 2017
- The Rt. Hon. The Viscount Thurso, PC – to be Lord Lieutenant of Caithness. – 17 August 2017
- Moira Niven, MBE – to be Lord Lieutenant of West Lothian – 17 August 2017
- Iona Sara McDonald – to be Lord-Lieutenant of Ayrshire and Arran. – 26 October 2017
- The Rt. Hon. The Lady Haughey, CBE – to be Lord-Lieutenant of Lanarkshire – 26 October 2017

== Life Peer ==
=== Conservative Party ===
- Ian Duncan, to be Baron Duncan of Springback, of Springbank in the County of Perth – 14 July 2017
- Sir Theodore Angnew, DL to be Baron Agnew of Oulton, of Oulton in the County of Norfolk – 19 October 2017
- Rona Fairhead, CBE to be Baroness Fairhead, of Yarm in the County of North Yorkshire – 19 October 2017

=== Crossbench ===
- The Rt Hon. Sir Ian Burnett, to be Baron Burnett of Maldon, of Maldon in the County of Essex – 30 October 2017
- The Rt Hon. Sir Christopher Geidt, GCVO, KCB, OBE to be Baron Geidt, of Crobeg in the County of Ross and Cromarty – 3 November 2017
- The Rt Rev. & Rt Hon. Richard Chartres, KCVO to be Baron Chartres, of Wilton in the County of Wiltshire – 10 November 2017
- Sir Bernard Hogan-Howe, QPM to be Baron Hogan-Howe, of Sheffield in the County of South Yorkshire – 10 November 2017
- General Sir Nicholas Houghton, GCB, CBE, ADC Gen to be Baron Houghton of Richmond, of Richmond in the County of North Yorkshire – 20 November 2017

== Most Noble Order of the Garter ==
Order of the Garter ribbon

=== Stranger Knight Companion of the Order of the Garter (KG) ===
- His Majesty The King of Spain, GCVO – 12 July 2017

== Knight Bachelor ==
Knight's Bachelor ribbon

- The Hon. Mr Justice Marcus Alexander Smith, QC – 30 January 2017
- The Rt Hon. Mike Penning, MP – 12 October 2017
- Robert Syms, MP – 12 October 2017
- The Hon. Mr Justice Simon James Bryan, QC – 25 October 2017
- The Hon. Mr Justice Akhlaq Ur-Rahman Choudhury, QC – 25 October 2017
- The Hon. Mr Justice Jonathan Lionel Cohen, QC – 25 October 2017
- The Hon. Mr Justice Julian Nicholas Goose, QC – 25 October 2017
- The Hon. Mr Justice Julian Bernard Knowles, QC – 25 October 2017
- The Hon. Mr Justice Peter Richard Lane, QC – 25 October 2017
- The Hon. Mr Justice Matthew James Nicklin, QC – 25 October 2017
- The Hon. Mr Justice Martin Benedict Spencer, QC – 25 October 2017
- The Hon. Mr Justice David Basil Williams, QC – 25 October 2017
- The Hon. Mr Justice Antony James Zacaroli, QC – 27 November 2017

== Most Distinguished Order of St Michael and St George ==
Order of St Michael and St George ribbon

=== Knight Grand Cross of the Order of St Michael and St George (GCMG) ===
- His Excellency The Hon. Robert Dadae – Governor-General of Papua New Guinea – 5 May 2017

== Royal Victorian Order ==
Royal Victorian Order ribbon

Royal Victorian Order (Honorary appointment) ribbon

=== Knight Grand Cross of the Royal Victorian Order (GCVO) ===
- The Rt. Hon. Sir Christopher Geidt, KCB, KCVO, OBE – Upon relinquishing his appointment as Private Secretary to Her Majesty and Keeper of The Queen's Archives – 5 October 2017
- His Royal Highness The Duke of Edinburgh, KG, KT, OM, ONZ, AK, GBE, CC, CMM, QSO, PC – To celebrate the 70th Anniversary of his marriage to The Queen – 20 November 2017

=== Knight / Dame Commander of the Royal Victorian Order (KCVO / DCVO) ===
- Rachel Ann Wells, CVO – on her retirement as Assistant Secretary of the Central Chancery of the Orders of Knighthood. – 28 July 2017
- Jonathan Marsden, CVO – upon relinquishing his appointment as Director of the Royal Collection and Surveyor of The Queen's Works of Art. – 19 December 2017

=== Commander of the Royal Victorian Order (CVO) ===
- Dr. Simon Case – 7 July 2017 – formerly Principal Private Secretary to the Prime Minister.

Honorary

- Professor Leon Krier – 7 February 2017

=== Lieutenant of the Royal Victorian Order (LVO) ===
- Raymond Wheaton, MVO, RVM – on retirement as Page of the Chambers, Royal Household. – 17 January 2017
- Shelley Chambers, MVO – for service as Deputy Head of Audit Services to the Royal Household. – 29 November 2017
- Ian Cornish – on his retirement as Head of Audit Services, Royal Household. – 12 December 2017

=== Member of the Royal Victorian Order (MVO) ===
- Captain (QGO) Ganeshkumar Tamanf, The Queen’s Own Gurkha Logistic Regiment – on relinquishment of his appointment as Queen’s Gurkha Orderly Officer – 12 May 2017
- Captain (QGO) Lakitbahadur Gurung, The Royal Gurkha Rifles – on relinquishment of his appointment as Queen’s Gurkha Orderly Officer – 12 May 2017
- Wing Commander Samuel Peter Fletcher, Royal Air Force – on relinquishment of his appointment as Equerry to The Queen. – 25 August 2017

== Most Excellent Order of the British Empire ==
Ribbon bar of the Order of the British Empire (Military)

Ribbon bar of the Order of the British Empire (Civil)

=== Knight / Dame Commander of the Order of the British Empire (KBE / DBE) ===
- The Hon. Mrs Justice Gwynneth Frances Knowles, QC – 25 October 2017
- The Hon. Mrs Justice Jane Clare Moulder, QC – 25 October 2017
- The Hon. Mrs Justice Amanda Louise Yip, QC – 25 October 2017

Honorary

- Pauline Philip – For services to the NHS.
- Edna O'Brien – For services to literature.
- Ralph Lauren – For services to fashion.
- Paul Polman – For services to business.

=== Commander of the Order of the British Empire (CBE) ===
Military division

- Air Commodore Martin Elliot Sampson, DSO – 21 April 2017

Honorary

- Reid Hoffman – For services to promoting UK business and social networking and the Marshall Scholarship scheme.
- Pertti Salolainen – For services to UK-Finland relations.

=== Officer of the Order of the British Empire (OBE) ===
Military division

- Commander Stephen Higham, Royal Navy
- Commander Mark Richard Vartan, Royal Navy
- Colonel Angus Donald MacGillivray, MC
- Colonel James Rowland Martin, DSO, MC, The Princess of Wales’s Royal Regiment
- Colonel Geoffrey Edward Minton, MBE, The Princess of Wales’s Royal Regiment
- Squadron Leader Emily Elizabeth Rickards, Royal Air Force

Honorary

- Professor Christian de Boissieu – For services to UK-French relations.
- Professor Adrienne Margaret Flanagan – For services to cancer research.
- Benoit Marie Jacques Mottrie – For services to commemoration and remembrance of British and Commonwealth armed forces.
- Ambassador Jesus Paraiso Tambunting – For services to UK-Philippine trade relations.

=== Member of the Order of the British Empire (MBE) ===
Military division

- Petty Officer Bethany Victoria Rauccio Burton, Royal Navy – 21 April 2017
- Major George John Robertson Little, Royal Marines – 21 April 2017
- Major Lloyd Benjamin Pritchard, Royal Marines – 21 April 2017
- Acting Major Thomas Joseph Goodall, The Royal Logistic Corps – 21 April 2017
- Lieutenant Colonel David Osborne Lee, The Parachute Regiment – 21 April 2017
- Colour Sergeant William Richard Thomas, The Parachute Regiment – 21 April 2017

Honorary

- Zainab Lababidi – For services to Oxfam.
- Angela Francisco Morado – For services to the British community in Portugal.
- Nuttanee Ratanapat – For services to UK interests in Thailand.
- Professor José Antonio de Sousa Neto – For services to UK interests and bilateral relations in business, culture, education and sport in the State of Minas Gerais, Brazil.
- Lars-Erik Wiklund – For services to UK-Sweden relations.
- Shereen Williams – For services to community service in Wales.

== British Empire Medal (BEM) ==
Ribbon bar of the British Empire Medal (Civil)

Honorary

- Mrs Thong-Udom Kerdphiami – For services to the British Embassy, Bangkok.
- Luiz Gustavo Miranda Lage – For services to British interests at the Rio 2016 Olympic and Paralympic Games.
- Maria Clara Mariani – For services to UK-Brazil historical patrimony and the British community in Bahia.
- Michael Joseph O'Halloran – For services to the Royal Academy.
- Professor Jaime Arturo Ramirez – For services to British interests at the Rio 2016 Olympic and Paralympic Games.
- George Stanley Tomkins – For services to the community in Kilkeel, Northern Ireland.

== Distinguished Service Order ==
Ribbon bar of the Distinguished Service Order

=== Companion of the Distinguished Service Order (DSO) ===
- Wing Commander James Robert Edward Walls, Royal Air Force – 21 April 2017

== Military Cross (MC) ==
Ribbon bar of the Military Cross

- Corporal Nicholas Jezeph, Royal Marines – 21 April 2017

== Distinguished Flying Cross (DFC) ==
Ribbon bar of the Distinguished Flying Cross

- Squadron Leader Roger Alexander Cruickshank, Royal Air Force – 21 April 2017

== Queen's Gallantry Medal (QGM) ==
Ribbon bar of the Queen's Gallantry Medal

- Captain Giles Edward George Moon, The Royal Lancers – 21 April 2017
- Acting Corporal Samuel James Butler, Royal Army Medical Corps

== Royal Victorian Medal (RVM) ==
Royal Victorian Medal ribbon

Gold

- Brian Alan Ernest Stanley, LVO, RVM – on relinquishment of the appointment of Stud Groom of the Royal Paddocks, Hampton Court. – 16 July 2017

Silver

- Alan Graham – 12 December 2017

== Mentioned in Despatches ==
Palm of the Mentioned in Despatches

- Major Daniel Thomas Eaton, Royal Marines – 21 April 2017
- Private Dominic Kyle Hopkins, The Parachute Regiment – 21 April 2017
- Colour Sergeant Steven David Nixon, The Parachute Regiment – 21 April 2017
- Flight Lieutenant Niall Pairman, Royal Air Force – 21 April 2017
- Flight Lieutenant Alex Fraser Vaughan, Royal Air Force – 21 April 2017

== Queen's Commendation for Bravery ==
- Marine Mark Andrew Charles Wheeler, Royal Marines – 21 April 2017
- Sergeant Paul Thomas Byrne, The Parachute Regiment – 21 April 2017
- Lance Corporal Thomas Christopher Corrigan, Corps of Royal Electrical and Mechanical Engineers – 21 April 2017
- Corporal Antony Luke Collins, Royal Air Force – 21 April 2017

== Queen's Commendation for Valuable Service ==
Palm of the Queen's Commendation for Valuable Service

- Acting Warrant Officer 2 Philip Barlow, Royal Marines – 21 April 2017
- Corporal Adam Paul Carter, Royal Marines – 21 April 2017
- Major James Dutton, Royal Marines – 21 April 2017
- Able Seaman (Seaman Specialist) Sarah Kirstie Griffiths, Royal Navy – 21 April 2017
- Commander Richard Hutchings, Royal Navy – 21 April 2017
- Petty Officer Craig Tyrone Jacobs, Royal Navy – 21 April 2017
- Corporal Edward Frank Main, Royal Marines – 21 April 2017
- Major James Edward Dallas Morris, Royal Marines – 21 April 2017
- Chief Petty Officer Peter Daniel Muir, Royal Navy – 21 April 2017
- Corporal Jamie Christopher Calvert, The Parachute Regiment – 21 April 2017
- Corporal Mahesh Gurung, The Royal Gurkha Rifles – 21 April 2017
- Major Edward Louis Tabor Harris, Corps of Royal Engineers – 21 April 2017
- Colonel Robert Mackenzie Howieson – 21 April 2017
- Major Edwin Peter Ooldild, The Royal Gurkha Rifles – 21 April 2017
- Major Colin Malcolm Oliver, MBE, The Rifles – 21 April 2017
- Sapper Philippa Proud, Corps of Royal Engineers, Army Reserve – 21 April 2017
- Staff Sergeant Christopher Arthur Rhodes, Royal Corps of Signals – 21 April 2017
- Acting Brigadier James Christopher Roddis, DSO, MBE – 21 April 2017
- Major David Joseph Stead, Corps of Royal Engineers – 21 April 2017
- Flight Lieutenant Alex Joseph Douglas Bamber, Royal Air Force – 21 April 2017
- Flight Lieutenant George Le Cornu, Royal Air Force – 21 April 2017
- Squadron Leader Christopher Michael Pearson, Royal Air Force – 21 April 2017
- Miss Lisa Michelle Wain, Civil Servant – 21 April 2017

== Order of St John ==
Order of St John ribbon

=== Baliff / Dame Grand Cross of the Order of St John ===
- The Hon. Lady Mary Angela Fiona Barttelot, MBE, DL
- The Most Rev. Archbishop Emeritius Desmond Tutu, CH

=== Knight of the Order of St John ===
- The Rt. Rev. John Davies
- Assistant Commissioner Colin Jones, QPM, DL
- The Rt. Rev. Barry Cennydd Morgan
- Jeremy Gilbert Oakley Stubbs
- Dr. Chung Chin Hung

=== Dame of the Order of St John ===
- Dame Mary Peters, CH, DBE

=== Commander of the Order of St John ===
- Peter Watts Baker
- Peter Richard Bradley, CBE
- Kwok-hoo Pedro Ching
- Major Martin James Everett, MBE
- David Charles Joliffe
- Adam Keith Johnston
- David Christopher Lindsay
- Andrew David Mitchell
- Derek William Charles Morgan, OBE, DL
- John Winston Reynolds
- Robert Frederick Sanderson
- John Edward Sunckell
