= Healthcare in Bedfordshire =

Healthcare in a county of England

Healthcare in Bedfordshire is the responsibility of Bedfordshire and Luton Integrated Care Systems.

== History ==
From 1947 to 1965 NHS services in Bedfordshire were managed by the North-West Metropolitan Regional Hospital Board. In 1974 the Boards were abolished and replaced by regional health authorities. Bedfordshire came under the North West Thames RHA. Regions were reorganised in 1996 and Bedfordshire came under the Anglia and Oxford Regional Health Authority. Bedfordshire had an Area Health Authority from 1974 until 1982 when it was divided into two district health authorities: North and South. in 1993 these were reunited. Regional health authorities were reorganised and renamed strategic health authorities in 2002. Bedfordshire and Hertfordshire was under Bedfordshire and Hertfordshire SHA. In 2006 regions were again reorganised and Bedfordshire came under NHS East of England until that was abolished in 2013. There were two primary care trusts for the area: Luton and Bedfordshire. In July 2022, a further reorganisation resulted in Bedfordshire coming under the current Integrated Care System.

== Sustainability and transformation plan ==
Milton Keynes, Bedfordshire and Luton formed a sustainability and transformation plan area in March 2016 with Pauline Philip, the Chief Executive of Luton and Dunstable University Hospital NHS Foundation Trust, as its leader The three CCGs shared a single clinical commissioning group chief officer and planned to set up a "fully operational" integrated care system but it was to continue in shadow form until 2019. In June 2018 the leaders of Milton Keynes, Luton and Bedford councils threatened to quit the partnership, saying it could not legitimately claim to be working towards an integrated system. The partnership was then led by Richard Carr who was also chief executive of Central Bedfordshire Council, also in the STP, which did not sign the letter. In January 2019 Luton Borough Council pulled out of what is now called an integrated care system, although it said it had close working relationships with Luton Clinical Commissioning Group and that this would continue.

== Commissioning ==
NHS England appointed Nick Robinson, an accountant, as interim accountable officer for Bedfordshire CCG, in March, breaching its own guidance about clinical leadership, although there were two interim assistant clinical deputy chairs.

In June 2017 Milton Keynes CCG was reported to be considering rationing the supply of hearing aids to one per person, and none for people with mild hearing loss. Central and North West London NHS Foundation Trust, which runs community services in the area, complained that these proposals were "incredibly damaging", contrary to national policy, robust evidence, and professional opinion..." In October 2017 plans were announced to deny surgery to smokers and obese people indefinitely unless the patients stopped smoking or lost substantial amounts of weight. Ian Eardley of the Royal College of Surgeons said, "This goes against clinical guidance and leaves patients waiting long periods of time in pain and discomfort. It can even lead to worse outcomes following surgery in some cases."

Luton Borough Council agreed to establish a health commissioning budget jointly with its CCG starting in 2018.

Bedfordshire Integrated Care Systems was said to be in the most difficult financial position of any in England in 2014. It was supposed to produce a £4.6m surplus at the end of 2014/15 but now expects to run up a ‘very serious and disturbing’ £25m deficit. Accountable Officer Dr Paul Hassan said "Much of our overspend has been on caring for patients at our local acute hospitals, but we have also seen a large rise in costs for providing mental healthcare and continuing healthcare for people in the community." By March 2015 the deficit for the year was predicted to be "up to £40m". Contributing factors were said to be a difficult winter, increased hospital activity and a high number of expensive out of area placements for mental health service users. It restated its accounts in June 2015 to record a £12.7m deficit for 2013-14 and £30.5m for 2014-15, resulting in a £43.2m cumulative deficit. It has had an increase in funding of £30 million per year.

== Primary and community care ==
There are 55 GP practices in Bedfordshire CCG and 31 in Luton CCG. Out-of-hours services are provided by Bedford On Call

Palliative care is provided by Keech Hospice Care, the Sue Ryder St John's Hospice in Moggerhanger, Keech Hospice Care Bedford Services and Willen Hospice in Milton Keynes.

In November 2017 East London NHS Foundation Trust won a £195 million five year contract to provide community health services in the county.

== Acute care ==
The main provider of NHS acute hospital care in the county is Bedfordshire Hospitals NHS Foundation Trust, which runs Bedford Hospital and Luton and Dunstable University Hospital.

Circle Health Ltd have a contract in the county for management of musculoskeletal care, which started in 2014. They have reduced the proportion of patients going on to secondary care by 24%. Bedford Hospital staff complain that patients are diverted to the nearby private hospital, that there are delays in referrals and that the trauma service which they provide is financially unsustainable without the flow of elective work. Some of these problems, they say, would be alleviated if there was an integrated information system.

== Mental health ==
NHS mental health services are provided by East London NHS Foundation Trust. South Essex Partnership University NHS Foundation Trust provided mental health services in the county until 1 April 2015.

== HealthWatch ==
Healthwatch is an organisation set up under the Health and Social Care Act 2012 to act as a voice for patients. There are three separate local Healthwatch groups in the county covering Bedford Borough, Central Bedfordshire, and Luton.

== See also ==
- Category:Health in Bedfordshire
- Healthcare in the United Kingdom
