= Navina =

Navina and Navin may refer to:

- Navina Najat Haidar, art historian and curator.
- Navina Bole is an Indian television actress.
- Ahalia Navina Evans CBE is a British former child and adolescent psychiatry consultant who has been the Chief Workforce.
- Navina Omilade is a retired German football midfielder of Nigerian descent.
- Navin Awal is a Nepali film director and writer.
- Navin Ramgoolam is the current Prime Minister of Mauritius.
- Navin Nischol (18 March 1946 – 19 March 2011) was an Indian actor.
- Navin Chawla (born 30 July 1945) is a retired Indian civil servant and writer, who served as 16th Chief Election Commissioner of India.
- Navin Chowdhry (born 22 November 1971) is an English actor
