= Norfolk Initiative for Coastal and Rural Health Equalities =

National Health Service institute in Norfolk, England

The Norfolk Initiative for Coastal and Rural Health Equalities (NICHE) is an NHS England ‘Anchor Institute’ within the Norfolk and Waveney Integrated Care System (ICS), based at the University of East Anglia in Norwich, England. NICHE's aims have been described as attempting to reducing health inequalities, improve workforce skills, improve collaboration, and promote wellbeing in communities across Norfolk and Waveney.

NICHE has funded research into issues such as patients recover after hip surgery, end of life care, and improving antenatal care for individuals with learning disabilities.

== History and background ==
NICHE was established in 2023 with funding from Health Education England's East of England branch (prior to HEE's merger into NHS England). This funding was intended to support Norfolk and Waveney Integrated Care System to improve health and social care for local communities.

NICHE is part of the Eastern Partnership for Innovations in Integrated Care (EPIIC), a group whose stated aims are addressing health inequalities.

== NICHE Events and Activity ==
NICHE has hosted events. Such as the NICHE Conference 2023.

NICHE has sponsored awards in healthcare.

== See also ==
- University of East Anglia
- Health Education England
- NHS Norfolk & Waveney Integrated Care Board
