= Judge Roth =

Judge Roth may refer to:

- Jane Richards Roth (born 1935), judge of the United States Court of Appeals for the Third Circuit
- Peter Roth (judge) (born 1952), judge of the High Court of England and Wales
- Stephen John Roth (1908–1974), judge of the United States District Court for the Eastern District of Michigan
- Stephen L. Roth (fl. 2010s), judge of the Utah Court of Appeals
