= Peter Roth =

Peter Roth may refer to:

- Peter Roth (alpine skier) (born 1961), German former alpine skier
- Peter Roth (executive), president of Warner Bros
- Peter Roth (musician) (born 1974), Israeli musician
- Peter Roth (judge) (born 1952), judge of the High Court of England and Wales
- Peter Roth (Medal of Honor), a soldier who won a Medal of Honor for his actions in the Battle of Lyman's Wagon Train
- Peter Roth (actor) (born 1955), Swedish actor in Songs from the Second Floor and Vägen ut
