= Bedford Hospital =

- Bedfordshire Hospitals NHS Foundation Trust
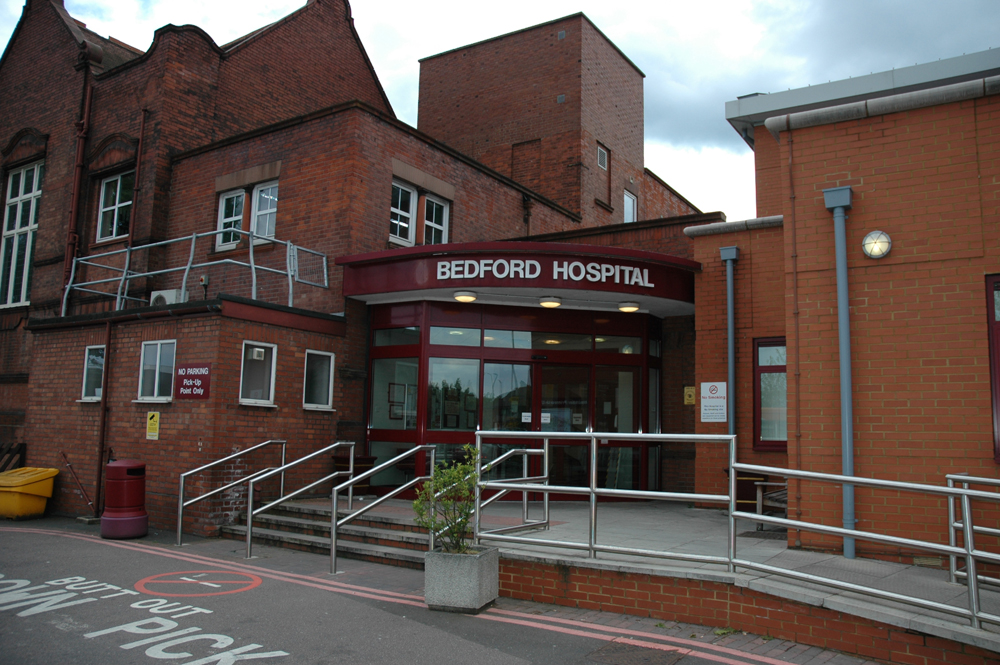
- Bedford Hospital's Britannia Road entrance

- Location in Bedfordshire

Geography
- Location: Bedford, Bedfordshire, England, United Kingdom
- Coordinates: 52.128857°N 0.471743°W

Organisation
- Care system: Public NHS
- Type: General

Services
- Emergency department: Yes Accident & Emergency

History
- Founded: 1803

Links
- Website: bedfordhospital.nhs.uk
- Lists: Hospitals in England

Bedford Hospital is a 400-bed district general hospital located in the English town of Bedford, serving the Borough of Bedford and parts of Central Bedfordshire, run by the Bedfordshire Hospitals NHS Foundation Trust.

== History ==
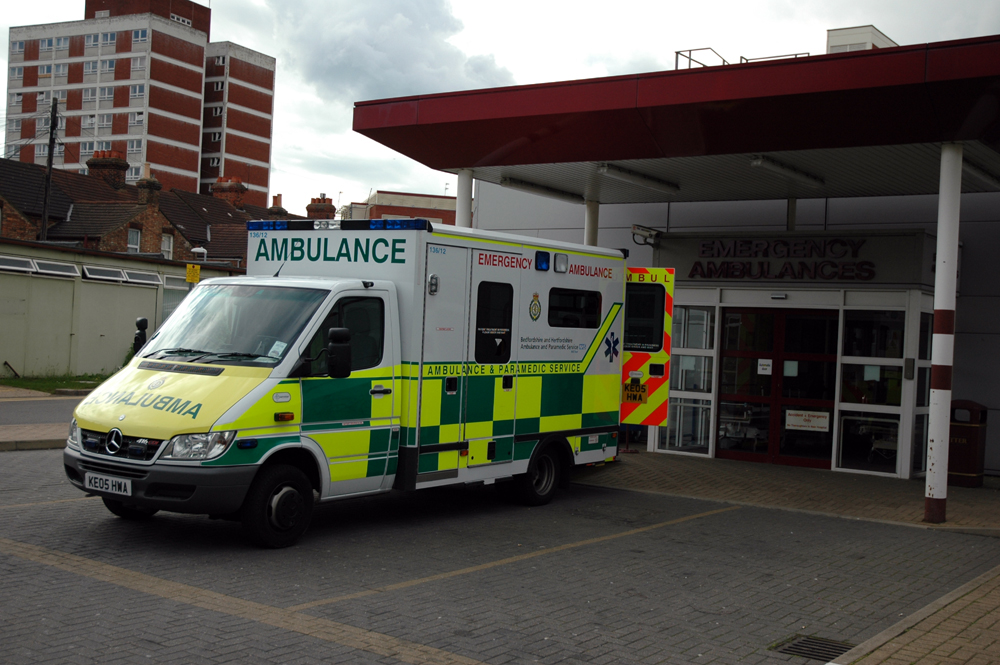
Accident & Emergency at the South Wing

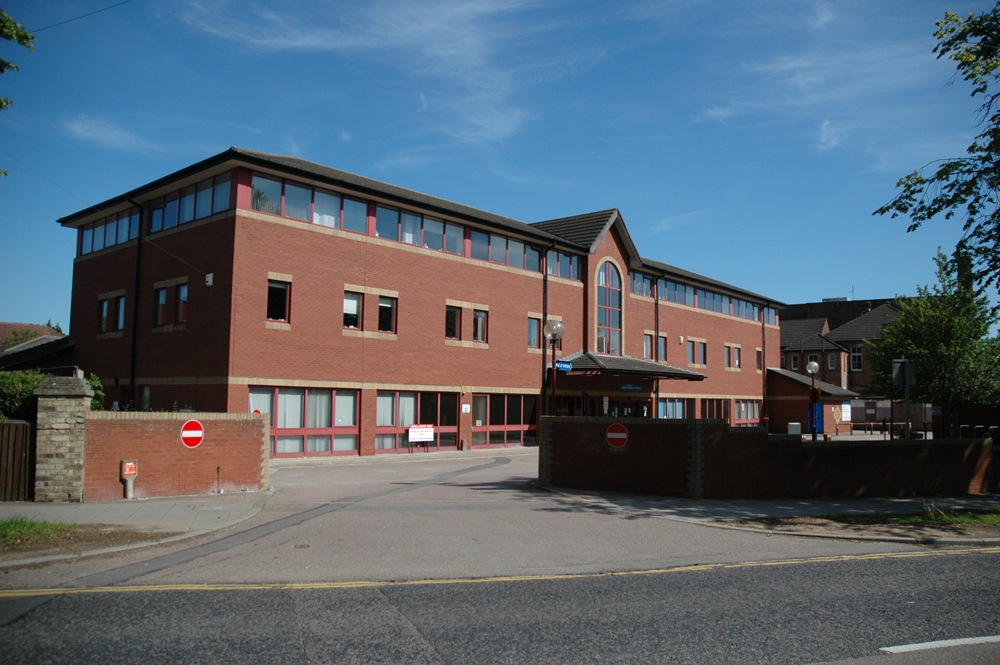
Gilbert Hitchcock House at the Bedford Health Village

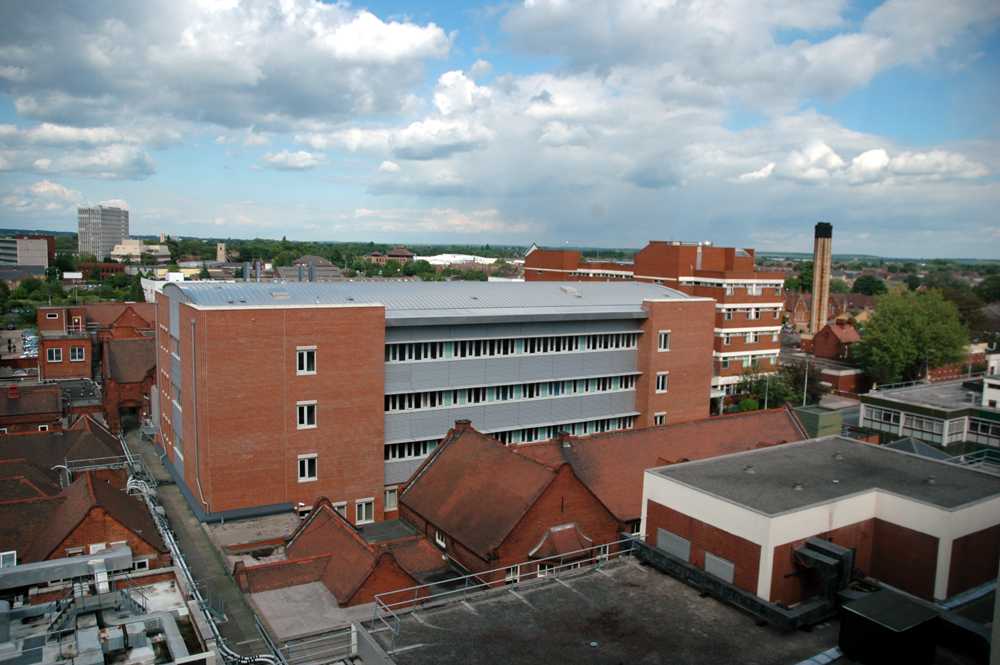
The new pathology building

The hospital was founded by Samuel Whitbread, the brewer, who had left £8,000 in his will for the purpose of establishing a hospital. The planning committee for the hospital, which included the Duke of Bedford, Lord John Russell and the brewer's son, also Samuel Whitbread made swift progress and the hospital opened in 1803.

Picture tiles depicting fairy tales and nursery rhymes, designed and painted by Philip H. Newman, were installed in the children's ward in 1898. Manufactured by W.B. Simpson and Co. they were given in commemoration of Queen Victoria's Diamond Jubilee. They were threatened with being covered up in 1997. In 2019 a proposal by the hospital to move the tiles to a museum because of concerns about hygiene was rejected by the Bedford Council. The twenty tiles remain on display in the hospital. The administrative block with the children's ward attached is a Grade II listed building.

Major recent developments have included the Cygnet Wing, which provides paediatric, maternity and gynaecology and which was opened by the Queen in 1996.

In 2001, it was reported in the local press that bodies were being stored on the floor of the chapel of rest, while part of the hospital's mortuary was undergoing maintenance. An internal inquiry found, that although the bodies were tampered with before the photographs were taken, the hospital's management was at fault, and the chief executive subsequently resigned.

The Primrose Centre for cancer patients was completed in 2003, the redevelopment of the pathology services unit was completed in 2006, a surgical assessment unit was completed in 2012 and an endoscopy unit was completed in 2015.

The Weller Wing, in which East London NHS Foundation Trust had provided psychiatric services, closed early in 2017.

In September 2017 plans were announced to merge the Bedford Hospital NHS Trust with the Luton and Dunstable University Hospital NHS Foundation Trust. In April 2020, this merger was completed, forming the Bedfordshire Hospitals NHS Foundation Trust.

== Services ==
The hospital operates from a series of sites:

- Main site (South Wing): Bedford Hospital is mainly situated on Britannia Road/Ampthill Road in the Cauldwell area of Bedford. This site (still popularly known as South Wing) is home to the Accident and Emergency department, theatres, pathology, inpatient wards, x-ray department, oncology services and the outpatients services. The main site houses BEDOC, NHS Bedfordshire CCG's GP out-of-hours emergency service.
- Bedford Health Village (North Wing): Some services are based at the Bedford Health Village, two miles north of the main site. This site (which used to be known as North Wing) includes the old Bedford workhouse building. Services here include occupational therapy, physiotherapy and rehabilitation facilities, as well as a chest clinic and a drop-in dental service.

== Performance ==
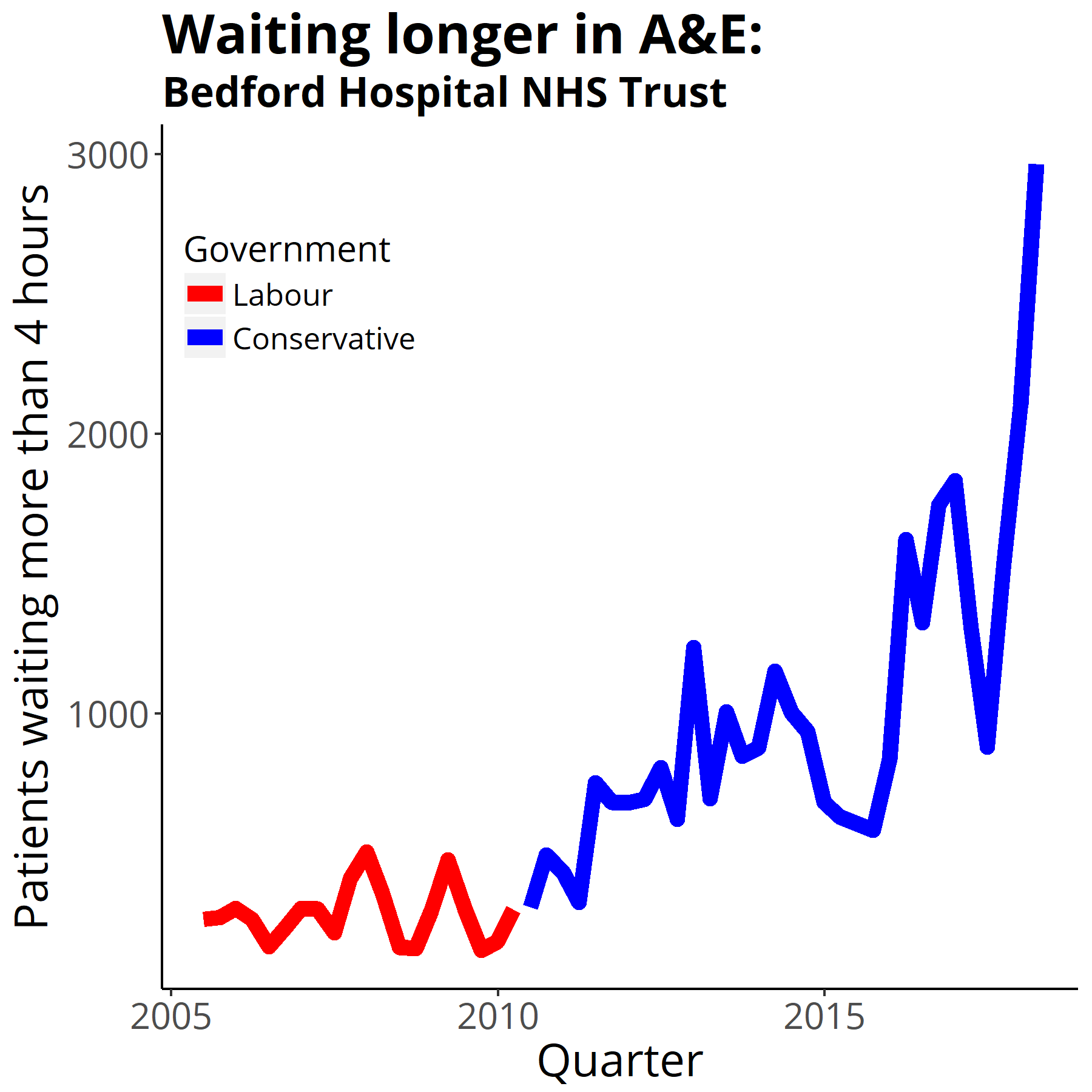
Four-hour target in the emergency department quarterly figures from NHS England Data from https://www.england.nhs.uk/statistics/statistical-work-areas/ae-waiting-times-and-activity/

In December 2013 it was announced that Monitor was reviewing of health services in Bedfordshire and Milton Keynes in an attempt to avert "significant problems ahead" in the local hospitals.

Circle Health was awarded a prime provider contract for Bedfordshire's Musculoskeletal service in April 2014 by the Clinical Commissioning Group and it was intended that the Trust would be a subcontractor. In November the Trust announced that it had refused to sign the contract because it endangered the viability of its trauma and Accident and Emergency service as the number of referrals dropped by 30%.

It was named by the Health Service Journal as one of the top hundred NHS trusts to work for in 2015. At that time it had 2211 full time equivalent staff and a sickness absence rate of 3.96%. 75% of staff recommend it as a place for treatment and 63% recommended it as a place to work. It spent 7.2% of its total turnover on agency staff in 2014/5.

== See also ==
- Healthcare in Bedfordshire
- List of hospitals in England
- List of NHS trusts
