= Health Education England =

Executive non-departmental public body of the Department of Health and Social Care

- Type: Non-departmental public body
- Staff: 2,259 (2019/20)
- Website: www.hee.nhs.uk

Health Education England (HEE) is an executive non-departmental public body of the Department of Health and Social Care. Its function is to provide national leadership and coordination for the education and training within the health and public health workforce within England. It has been operational since June 2012.

In November 2021 it was announced that the organisation would be merged with NHS England by April 2023. It was suggested that this would make responsibilities for workforce planning much clearer and make it easier to develop the workforce strategy needed to meet current and future demand for services.

The merger was completed in April 2023, and HEE become the new Workforce, Training and Education Directorate within the national NHS England organisation.

== Functions ==
Key functions of HEE include:

- providing leadership for the new education and training system.
- ensuring that the workforce has the right skills, behaviours and training, and is available in the right numbers, to support the delivery of excellent healthcare and drive improvements
- supporting healthcare providers and clinicians to take greater responsibility for planning and commissioning education and training through the development of Local Education and Training Boards (LETBs), which are statutory committees of HEE
- ensuring that the shape and skills of the health and public health workforce evolve with demographic and technological change

== History ==
HEE was one of the new bodies set out in the NHS reforms of April 2012. Originally established as a special health authority on 28 June 2012, it became a non-departmental public body (NDPB) on 1 April 2015 under the provisions of the Care Act 2014.

Dr Navina Evans, Chief Executive of East London NHS Foundation Trust, a psychiatrist, was appointed Chief Executive in March 2020, succeeding Prof Ian Cumming.

In August 2020, Dr Harpreet Sood was appointed as Health Education England (HEE) Non-Executive Director.

In November 2021, it was announced that HEE would merge with NHS England.

== Plans ==
Its third national workforce plan, published in December 2015, provides for an increase of nearly 15% in nurses and doctors trained by 2020. This is planned to lead to an increase of 21,133 qualified adult nurses, 6039 hospital consultants and 5381 General Practitioners after allowing for retirement and staff turnover.

== NHS knowledge and library services ==
HEE leads on the strategic development of NHS knowledge and library services. The national NHS knowledge and library services team at HEE is responsible for procuring core digital knowledge resources on behalf of the health and care workforce and trainees.

National Health Service (England) has 177 autonomous library services largely based in acute hospitals, but also in mental health and community health services. These deliver knowledge services to trainees and staff. In large cities, particularly in London, a small number of universities offer knowledge services to NHS staff as well as to students.

In 1997, national guidance on NHS library and information services observed duplication and lack of co-ordination, partly arising from complex funding arrangements. Health Service Guideline HSG (97) 47 concentrated on enabling equitable access to the knowledge base for all healthcare professionals irrespective of their discipline, by requiring the development of multi-professional library and information services. It required that each Hospital Trust in England draw up a library and information strategy.

A digital library service for the NHS in England called the National electronic Library for Health (NeLH) was launched in 1998, later becoming the National Library for Health (NLH). Management of this service was transferred to NICE, the National Institute for Health and Care Excellence in 2008.

In 2012, organisational changes saw the transfer of the regional leads responsible for NHS libraries, and their budgets, into HEE, for the first time bringing all of them together within a single organisation.

=== Knowledge for Healthcare ===
The first five-year strategy, “Knowledge for Healthcare: a development framework 2015-2020” was published in December 2014 and envisioned by planners to be a 15-year programme of work. A programme manager was appointed for one year following publication to establish a programme and project management infrastructure through which the work could be effectively progressed and reviewed. Following successes, the regional teams were formed into a single national team and the decision was made to appoint a national lead. The programme manager is now a full-time and permanent post, and the postholder is responsible for leading and sustaining a coherent national approach.

Through 2019–20, the HEE reviewed their strategy. The Carter review of operational productivity and performance in English NHS Acute hospitals in 2016 signalled the need for greater use of evidence and data to engage business managers and clinical leaders.[Varela] The Long-Term plan, published in 2019, spoke of the “strong scientific tradition of evidence-based decisions about care” and the need for ready access to decision support. It featured several workstreams, including mobilising evidence and organizational knowledge; patients, carers and the public; resource discovery; quality and impact; and workforce planning and development. The second five-year strategy was published in January 2021.

HEE's aim in developing and continuing to publish iterations of the national strategy for NHS knowledge and library services is to:

- Set direction, articulate a clear ambition and establish priorities
- Invite key stakeholders to partner work with us in order “to transform and optimise healthcare library and knowledge services, harness new technologies, and champion service development and re-configuration”
- Guide investment decisions, nationally and locally, including in relation to commitment to developing new information products
- Encourage the spread and adoption of best practice and ‘new’ models of service delivery, bringing evidence closer to teams and to decision-making.

== HEE during the COVID-19 pandemic ==
The national HEE team supported the wider NHS system during the COVID-19 pandemic. HEE launched a bank of Coronavirus literature searches and a collection of COVID-19 current awareness bulletins, with users recognising that: “They are willing to share the work they are doing with other services in the NHS and recognising that in many cases this only needs to happen once.”

== Junior Doctors controversies ==
In February 2016, the chief executive of HEE Ian Cumming sent a letter to all the chief executives of NHS Foundation trusts indicating that the organisation could cut funding for training posts in any trust which refused to impose the new juniors doctor contract. In January 2017, emails seen by the newspaper The Independent showed that HEE sent drafts of the letter to the Department of Health and that the Secretary of State for Health Jeremy Hunt was aware of the letter prior to publication.

In May 2017 the Court of Appeal decided that the organisation could be considered as an employer of junior doctors, in relation to whistle blowing claims brought via an Employment Tribunal, through the case of Dr Chris Day. Dr Day claimed he was discriminated against as a whistle blower but later acknowledged, as part of a settlement agreement, that HEE had acted in good faith towards him. However, there is evidence to suggest that the settlement was forced upon Dr. Day and he continues to appeal.
