= Janamat Prakashan =

Janamat Prakashan is a Nepali literary publishing house, located in Banepa, Kavre, Nepal. It publishes a literary magazine called, Janamat. It also publishes various books on Nepali literature. Mohan Duwal, a literary figure of Nepal, is the chairperson of the publishing house. Mohan Duwal is also the winner of Toya Nath Pashupati Kumari Literary Award- Bikram Sambat 2070. The publishing house also honors Nepali writers through its award funds. Some of the publications through Janamat Prakashan are:

1. Srijanala phoolharu, by Mohan Duwal

2. Sahityik phantka mera kehi dharana, by Shyam Prasad

3. चामल खानेहरू र चौलानी पिउनेहरू / Porridge Eaters and Gruel Drinkers, by Santosh Lamichhane

4. Saalik Ko Saamrajya, by Narendra Bahadur Shrestha
