= Complications: A Surgeon's Notes on an Imperfect Science =

Nonfiction collection of essays by American surgeon Atul Gawande

- Author: Atul Gawande
- Language: English
- Genre: Nonfiction
- Published: January 1, 2002
- Publisher: Picador
- Publication place: United States of America
- ISBN: 1861974132

Complications: A Surgeon's Notes on an Imperfect Science is a nonfiction book collection of essays written by the American surgeon Atul Gawande. Gawande wrote this during his general surgery residency at Brigham and Women's Hospital and was published in 2002 by Picador. The book is divided into three sections: Fallibility, Mystery, and Uncertainty, all going in depth into the problems physicians may face when practicing a variety of procedures in medicine. Each of these sections puts forth different challenges doctors must face that make them imperfect and errant, resulting in the inevitable occurrence of errors.

== Background ==
Atul Gawande wrote the Complications during his surgical residency at Brigham and Women's Hospital. Working approximately 110 hours a week, Gawande would have to leave his writing of his essays for the nighttime and the weekends. Although the amount of time Gawande would spend working made it more difficult to complete his writing projects, this large workload allowed him to be exposed to more experiences. Before the publication of Complications, Gawande published some of the essays on The New Yorker, including The Pain Perplex, When Doctors Make Mistakes, A Queasy Feeling, Whose Body Is It, Anyway?, When Good Doctors Go Bad, Crimson Tide, Final Cut, and The Man Who Couldn’t Stop Eating. The Dead Baby Mystery was also published prior to the release of Complications on Slate magazine.

== Themes ==
=== Fallibility in medicine ===
In the writing of Complications, Gawande attempts to elucidate medicine. In many of the essays included in the book, in particular When Doctors Make Mistakes and Education of a Knife, demonstrate many of the mistakes physicians may make when treating their patients. In these two essays, Gawande discusses his own struggles inserting a central venous catheter and performing an emergency tracheotomy that nearly results in the death of the patient. These anecdotes serve the purpose of shedding light on the fallibility of doctors and the imperfect nature of medicine. Since doctors are humans, they are also prone to making mistakes when assessing the conditions of their patients or when performing a certain procedure. This humanizing of doctors that takes place in Complications relieves the pressure doctors may feel when they make human mistakes and it also calls for a new patient culture. By knowing the fallibility present in medicine, patients with more information may know how to ask the right questions at the right moments to challenge doctors that may reduce the possibility of errors while also knowing when to have faith in the system during emergency situations.

=== Mystery in medicine ===
A major theme Gawande touches on is the theme of mystery in medicine. The entire second section of the book, Mystery, goes over patient cases Gawande attends to that stem from unknown causes or are just rarely found. The Case of the Red Leg (this is in part 3 - Uncertainty), is an example of how the mystery behind a disease impacts the work physicians must do. When confronted with a scenario in which the patient could either have a common cellulitis disease or a rare, deadly necrotizing fasciitis. Heavily influenced by his recent exposure to necrotizing fasciitis, Gawande decides to do a biopsy. This case reflects how sometimes, physicians must use not only science to treat patients, but intuition as well due to the fact current science can't clearly identify a disease. This theme is also resonated in The Pain Perplex which concerns itself with the problems of treating pain that is caused by the brain. Doctors are unsure of the causes of this pain and don't exactly know how to treat it. This mystery surrounding medicine demonstrates its own imperfection that doctors and patients should both be aware of. By knowing the shortcomings of medicine, doctors and patients alike are able to improve the care and doctor-patient relationship since they are aware of what medicine can accomplish through science and its limitations.

=== Ethics in medicine ===
Complications goes over many of the ethical issues present in medicine today. In Education of a Knife, the morality of the learning process for future doctors is discussed. Future doctors learn how to perform a certain procedure by doing surgery on patients, meaning that some patients will have to be the first time for future physicians when learning a surgery, as is the case with Gawande when he learns to perform a central line. The moral dilemma raised from this is whether it is fair to the first-time patients that must have to deal with the drawbacks of having an inexperienced physician perform surgery on them. The additional problem is that if learning physicians aren't allowed to perform surgeries, how will they be able to fully master the concept of surgery without putting it to practice.

The ethical dilemma that arises from the autonomy of patients versus the paternalism of the doctors is also discussed in Complications. This issue consists of who has control over the procedure to be put into action when facing life or death scenarios, the doctor or the patient? In the essay of Whose Body Is It Anyway? Gawande goes into detail over his firsthand experience facing this dilemma. The doctors wanted to place their patient on assisted breathing to keep him alive but the patient didn't want to be placed on it. When the patient went unconscious, the doctors proceeded to assist his breathing which allowed him to stay alive. The ethical question that arises from this situation is should the patient have full control over their body regardless of their lesser knowledge when compared to physicians that could possibly save their lives?

== Recognition ==
Complications was a National Book Award Finalist for Nonfiction in 2002. Following its original publication in 2002 in the United States, Complications has been published in over 20 different languages and over 100 countries.
