= Checklist =

Aide-memoire to ensure consistency and completeness in carrying out a task

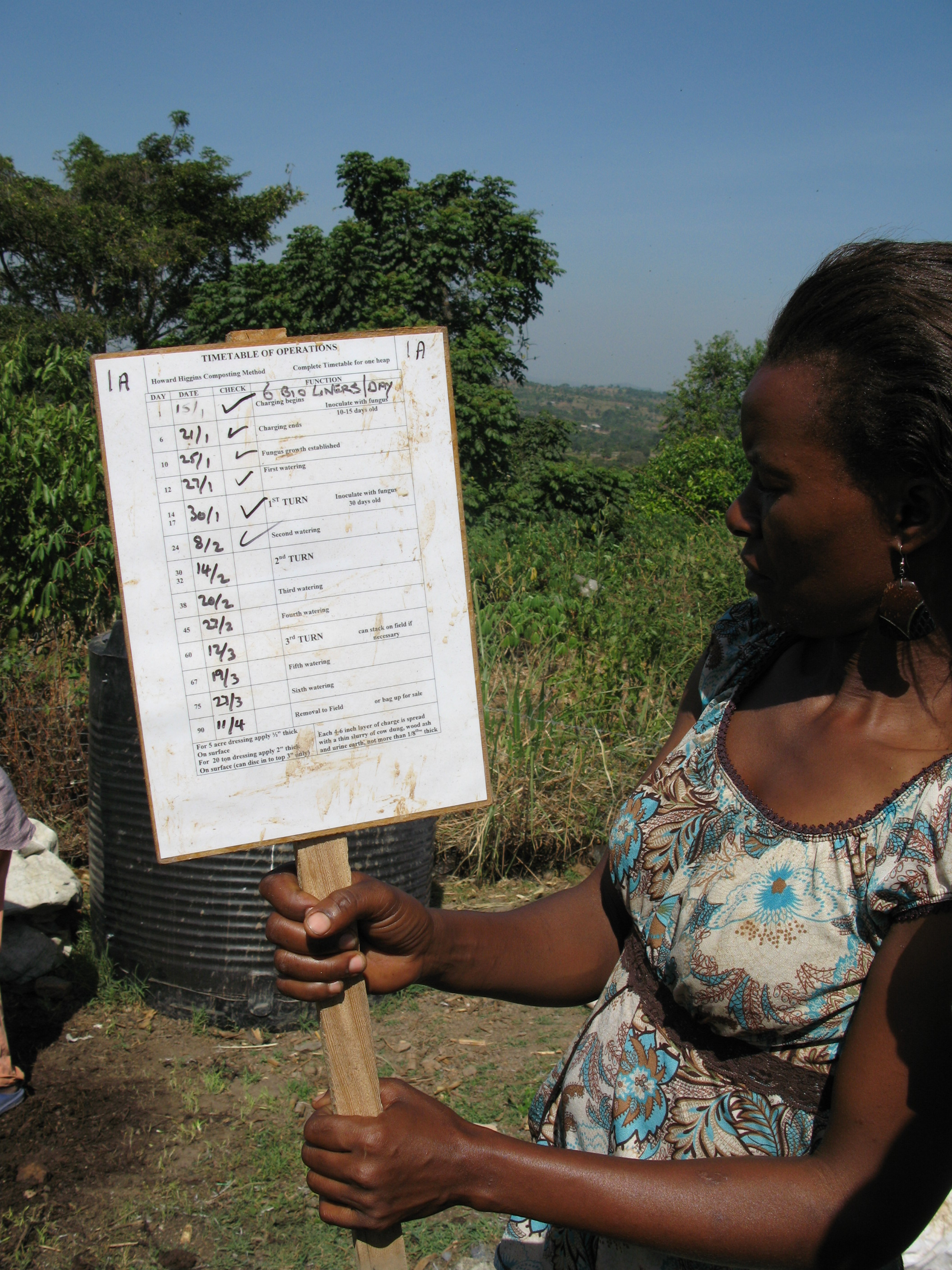
Checklists are useful for applying methodology.

A checklist is a type of job aid used in repetitive tasks to reduce failure by compensating for potential limits of human memory and attention. Checklists are used both to ensure that safety-critical system preparations are carried out completely and in the correct order, and in less critical applications to ensure that no step is left out of a procedure. They help to ensure consistency and completeness in carrying out a task. A basic example is the "to do list". A more advanced checklist would be a schedule, which lays out tasks to be done according to time of day or other factors, or a pre-flight checklist for an airliner, which should ensure a safe take-off.

A primary function of a checklist is documentation of the task and auditing against the documentation. Use of a well-designed checklist can reduce any tendency to avoid, omit or neglect important steps in any task. For efficiency and acceptance, the checklist should be easily readable, include only necessary checks, and be as short as reasonably practicable.

== History ==
It is widely accepted that checklists appeared after the crash of the Boeing B-17 prototype Model 299 plane on October 30, 1935. Possibly, the source of such common knowledge is The Checklist Manifesto book by Atul Gawande. However, the Oxford English Dictionary states that the word appeared in 1853.

The earliest discovered evidence of the "check-list" usage is seen in the "Journal of the House of Representatives of the State of New Hampshire at Their Session Holden at the Capitol in Concord" issued in 1841 and describing the elections-related events of the autumn of 1840.

== Purpose ==
In general, a checklist is a quality management tool, an aid to completing a complex task correctly and completely. It is an aid to recall, provides a reminder of the correct sequence, and uses the operator's knowledge and skill efficiently to ensure that no critical steps are omitted, even when the operator is under stress or has degraded attention due to fatigue or other distractions, It allows cross checking, keeps team members informed of the status of readiness, and can provide a legal record of a sequence of events to indicate due diligence. It differs from an instruction manual or operating manual in that it does not normally provide details on how to perform the steps, as it assumes that the operator is competent and familiar with each step.

== Applications ==
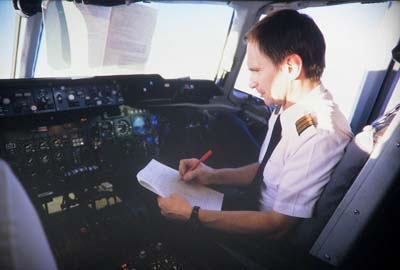
A pilot of a DC-10 consulting his checklist

=== Safety critical systems ===
Checklists are used to help avoid accidental omission of important preparation of equipment and systems. These may be routine operations like pre-flight checks on an airliner or relatively infrequent occasions like commissioning a nuclear power station or launching a spacecraft. The value of checklists is proportional to the complexity of the system and the consequences of a system failure. They may also aid in mitigating claims of negligence in public liability claims by providing evidence of a risk management system being in place. A signed off checklist with a document describing the listed checks may be accepted as evidence of due diligence. Conversely, the absence of a mandatory checklist may be considered evidence of negligence.

==== Aviation and space flight safety ====
Checklists have long been a feature of aviation safety to ensure that critical items are not overlooked. The best known example is the cockpit preflight checklist, which is intended to ensure that the crew correctly configures the aircraft for flight on every flight. A normal checklist is used before critical flight segments, such as takeoff, approach and landing, which are the phases in which the highest incidence of accidents occur due to procedural error. Checklists are also used for troubleshooting, to identify and where practicable, correct malfunctions. They cannot substitute for pilot skill and learned and practiced immediate response to critical malfunctions, but are useful for mitigation attempts when time allows.

==== Health care ====
In health care, particularly surgery, checklists may be used to ensure that the correct procedure is carried out on each patient. Checklists have been used in healthcare practice to ensure that clinical practice guidelines are followed. An example is the WHO Surgical Safety Checklist developed for the World Health Organization and published in 2008, which has been found to have a large effect on improving patient safety. According to a meta-analysis after introduction of the checklist mortality dropped by 23% and all complications by 40%, but higher-quality studies are required to make the meta-analysis more robust. Checklist use in healthcare has not always met with success and transferability between settings has been questioned. A survey found them to have no statistical effect in a cohort of hospitals in the Province of Ontario in Canada. In the UK, a study on the implementation of a checklist for provision of medical care to elderly patients admitting to hospital found that the checklist highlighted limitations with frailty assessment in acute care and motivated teams to review routine practices, but that work is needed to understand whether and how checklists can be embedded in complex multidisciplinary care.

==== Underwater diving ====
In professional diving, checklists are used in the preparation of equipment for a dive, and to ensure that the diver and life support systems are fully prepared before they enter the water. To a lesser extent, checklists are used by a minority of recreational divers, and by a larger proportion of technical divers during pre-dive checks. Studies have shown checklists to be effective at reducing the number of errors and consequent incidents.

=== Quality assurance applications ===
- Used in quality assurance of software engineering, to check process compliance, code standardization and error prevention, and others.
- Often used in industry in operations procedures
- In civil litigation to deal with the complexity of discovery and motions practice. An example is the open-source litigation checklist.
- Used by some investors as a critical part of their investment process,
- The creation of emergency survival kits, first aid kits and other collections of diverse apparatus, to ensure that the set is complete.
- Janitorial checklists are used for quality control.

=== For information ===
- An ornithological checklist (Category:Ornithological checklists), a list of birds with standardized names that helps ornithologists communicate with the public without the use of Latinised scientific names.
- A biodiversity checklist is a list of organisms recorded from a given geographical region or taxon. These include worldwide lists indicating the continued existence of species within specified taxa, and are also used to record the species found in countries, bioregions, or specific protected areas. They may be a form of database.
- A popular tool for tracking sports card collections. Randomly inserted in packs, checklist cards provide information on the contents of sports card set.

== Effectiveness of checklists ==
Ranapurwala et al. (2017) found:

The use of memorized checklists was similar to not using any checklist at all; hence the use of written checklists should be encouraged, instead.

Characteristics of effective checklists include:

- Checklists should be simple and convenient to use. Each listed item should be necessary and together they should be sufficient.
- Checklists focused on the responsibilities of a specific person, or a group who will work together, are less likely to have items left out.
- Grouping items which can be done at the same time or place, or by the same person, often improves efficiency.
  - A group may have a checkbox to indicate completion of the group. This is more likely to be helpful if there are several groups.
- Where reasonably practicable the items to be checked by a specific person can be grouped on the list. This makes it easier for them to keep track of what they have done and must still do. In some cases it may help to split them off as a separate checklist.
- Items should not be over-detailed in description nor ambiguous. A checklist should not try to define or describe procedures which should be familiar to the checker, though critical steps may usefully be listed in order when order is important.
- Ordering of the list should be logical. Where chronological order is important, it should be indicated by order on the list. Where items to be checked are spatially distributed, an order minimising travel or search time is efficient.
- The most convenient and reliable checklists are normally completed from top to bottom in a single session. It should be easy to recover from any interruption without risking missing an item or redoing a check unnecessarily.
- The physical checklist must be convenient to use on site. It should not require special effort to read, or protect it from the environment.
- It may be useful to cross-reference the checklist to the standard procedure, where the process is definitively described in detail, particularly for training and audit purposes. This makes it easy to check if there is any doubt.
- Some checklists must be signed off and kept as evidence, others may be re-usable. This may affect the format and materials.
- Checkboxes at the beginning of each item are easier to find and follow to the next incomplete check. A keyword at the beginning of the text will help ensure that the correct box is ticked.
- When several checklists are used, due to complexity of the task, or the need for several people to make checks at different places, a master checklist indicating the completion of each subordinate checklist may be used.
- If instructions are necessary, they should be included. If not, they should be left out as they will distract the user.

== Types ==
- Lists of actions for standard procedures, in which details are provided for each step.
- Lists of actions for standard procedures, in which no or very little detail is provided for each step on the assumption that the operator is entirely familiar with each step, and the checklist is used to ensure that no steps are omitted, or the preferred order is followed
- Project coordination lists, which specify who is responsible for each part of the project.
- Troubleshooting checklists, which may have multiple branches for diagnosis, or a series of procedures for responding to an emergency
- Checklists to increase objectivity in decision-making, to reduce emotional influences.
- Lists of things to be done over a specified period.

== Design ==
The design of a checklist should fit the purpose of the list. If a checklist is perceived as a top-down means to control behaviour by the organisational hierarchy it is more likely to be rejected and fail in its purpose. A checklist perceived as helping the operator to save time and reduce error is likely to be better accepted. This is more likely to happen when the user is involved in the development of the checklist.

Rae et al. (2018) define safety clutter as "the accumulation and persistence of 'safety' work that does not contribute to operational safety", and state that "when 'safety' rules impose a significant and unnecessary burden on the performance of everyday activities, both work and safety suffer".

An objective in checklist design that it should promote a positive attitude towards the use of the checklist by the operators. For this to happen it must be realistic, convenient and not be regarded as a nuisance. A checklist should be designed to describe and facilitate a physical procedure that is accepted by the operators as necessary, effective, efficient and convenient.

=== Mode of use ===
A checklist may be used to identify the action, after which it is done, then checked off as complete and the next item identified, known as the read–do, do–list or call–do–response process, or the tasks may be done, and then the checklist consulted to ensure that nothing has been left out, the do–confirm procedure, in which the status of tasks must be remembered until checked off, which may result in more errors, or challenge, verification, and response process, in which the checklist is used after the tasks have been completed. Both methods have merit and suitable applications, and the most suitable type of checklist will depend on the type of operation.

In the call–do–response system, the checklist is used to lead the operators through a step-by-step procedure where one operator directs the others, following the list. Each item requiring configuration is listed on the checklist and all relevant operators must be present while the checks are done. This method tends to be more detailed and time-consuming. It may be more appropriate for systems which are less familiar to the operators.

In the challenge–verification–response, the operators prepare the system following a standard sequence of actions performed from memory, then use the checklist to verify that the critical items have been correctly configured. One operator reads the challenge part of the checklist, the designated parties verify the status, and one of them provides the appropriate response. This is done in sequence until the list is complete. It may be ticked or signed off as specified. This method is efficient, as each operator can get on with their checks and then when the checklist is run through, all the relevant crew are updated on the system status.

=== Physical characteristics ===
Physical characteristics are things such as the actual size of the document, contrast, colour, and typography. The main factors in typography are legibility of text and readability in the conditions in which the document is expected to be used.

Legibility of text involves the selection of characters to enable the reader to identify them quickly and positively discriminate them from other characters. Readability is the quality of the word or text which allows rapid recognition of single words, word groups, abbreviations, and symbols.

Thousands of fonts are available, in two major groups: Roman (with serifs) and sans-serif. Research has shown that sans-serif is more legible than Roman as the absence of serifs presents simple and clean typeface. Arial or Helvetica are preferred.

The consensus of researchers is that lowercase is more legible because the pattern of the whole word is more familiar, and the pattern of ascenders and descenders is helpful for recognition. The occasional use of uppercase words for emphasis or in acronyms is acceptable, particularly where this is the common usage.

Font size is important for readability, especially for older operators. A font size between 14 and 20 points is recommended for reasonably well illuminated situations. Font size less than 10 points is not recommended. Checklists for use in poorly illuminated conditions should use a larger font for improved readability. Black text on a white background is generally preferred for best contrast, though in some cases a yellow background is acceptable.

Other factors influencing readability and reducing error include both horizontal and vertical character spacing, stroke width and character height to width ratio, and line length. Italics reduce readability of large areas of text but are acceptable for emphasis of a few words. Bolding does not affect readability significantly, but is useful for emphasis, and is best used with discretion. The use of multiple type faces in body text can be confusing and significantly reduces readability, so should be avoided. Contrast is more useful than colour to provide visibility of characters. White on black can be useful if dark adaptation must be preserved, but is not optimum when illumination is good. If checklists are plastic laminated, an anti-glare finish should be used to prevent disruption by highlights. Opacity of the paper is important if printed on both sides or there is a possibility of backlighting.

=== Content and layout ===
The workload and time available should be considered. Each listed item should be necessary and together they should be sufficient. Only necessary instructions should be included. A checklist should be as brief as possible without compromising clarity. Items should not be over-detailed in description nor ambiguous. A checklist should not try to define or describe procedures which should be familiar to the checker, though critical steps may usefully be listed in order when order is important. Numbering the items usually helps with place-keeping. It may be useful to cross-reference the checklist to the standard procedure document, where the process is definitively described in detail, particularly for training and audit purposes. This makes it easy to check if there is any doubt, but does not distract the user. Version number and date may be required to ensure that the current authorised version is in use.

Ordering of the list should be logical. Where chronological order is important, it should be indicated by order on the list. The most convenient and reliable checklists are normally completed from top to bottom in a single session. It should be easy to recover from any interruption without risking missing an item or redoing a check unnecessarily. Grouping items which can be done at the same time or place, or by the same person, often improves efficiency. Where items to be checked are spatially distributed, an order minimising travel or search time is efficient.

Checkboxes at the beginning of each item are easier to find and follow to the next incomplete check. A keyword at the beginning of the text will help ensure that the correct box is ticked.

=== Format ===
Example checklist

Checklists are often presented as lists with small checkboxes down the left hand side of the page. A small tick or checkmark is drawn in the box after the item has been completed. If practicable a check should not be split over two pages.

Other formats are also sometimes used. Aviation checklists generally consist of a system and an action divided by a dashed line, and lack a checkbox as they are often read aloud and are usually intended to be reused.

Some checklists must be signed off and kept as evidence, others may be re-usable. This may affect the format and materials.

=== Errors ===
Long or confusing items, an inconvenient order, or any other characteristic that causes the users to perceive it as an obstacle will increase the chances that when constrained for time, the operators will revert to alternative methods, omit items or disregard the checklist entirely.

Error conditions that may occur include:

- Using the wrong checklist.
- Difficulty in finding the right checklist.
- Difficulty in confirming that the checklist is the right one for the situation.
- Losing track of where one is in the checklist.
- Missing a step or not completing a step after an interruption.
- Misunderstanding the action required by the checklist.
- Difficulty in confirming that an action required by the checklist was done correctly.
- Difficulty in finding the next step after a conditional statement.
- Difficulty in reading a checklist.
- Lack of clarity about who should carry out a checklist action.
- Failing to complete the checklist.

=== History ===
During the National Transportation Safety Board (NTSB) hearings into the crash of Northwest Airlines Flight 255, human factors specialist Earl Weiner testified that he "did not know of any human factors research on how a checklist should be designed". NASA research into the matter concluded that as of 1989, there was basically no human factors research available anywhere specific to aircraft checklists.

The NTSB recommended that the FAA investigate ways of presenting checklists that produce better performance. The Safety Board also recommended that the FAA should specify typography criteria for checklists for commercial operators. Researchers found problems with both the physical design and social issues associated with the use of checklists which degrades effective use. Two documents were produced by NASA, Degani, Asaf; Wiener, Earl L. (May 1990). Human Factors of Flight-Deck Checklists: The Normal Checklist. NASA Contractor Report 177549 (Report). NASA. and Degani, Asaf (December 1992). On the Typography of Flight-deck Documentation. NASA Contractor report # 177605 (Report). NASA.. This was followed by a document from the UK CAA: "CAP 676: Guidance on the Design, Presentation, and Use of Emergency and Abnormal Checklist".

== Use ==
Excessive dependence of checklists may hinder performance when dealing with a time-critical situation, for example a medical emergency or an in-flight emergency. Checklists should not be used as a replacement for common sense or necessary skill. Intensive training including rote-learning of checklists can help integrate use of checklists with more adaptive and flexible problem solving techniques.

Experimental work has shown that memorised checklists are less effective than written checklists in identifying unsafe conditions when time is not critical.

== See also ==
- Check sheet, a form (document) used to collect data in real time at the location where the data is generated
- Checksum, data used to detect errors in other data (often automated)
- Digital calendar
- Task list organization, the process of planning and exercising conscious control of time spent on specific activities
- Punch list, also known as snag list, a construction project document
- To do list
- The Checklist Manifesto: How to Get Things Right – 2009 book by Atul Gawande advocating the use of checklists
