= Santosh Lamichhane =

Nepali writer, born 1983

- सन्तोष लामिछाने
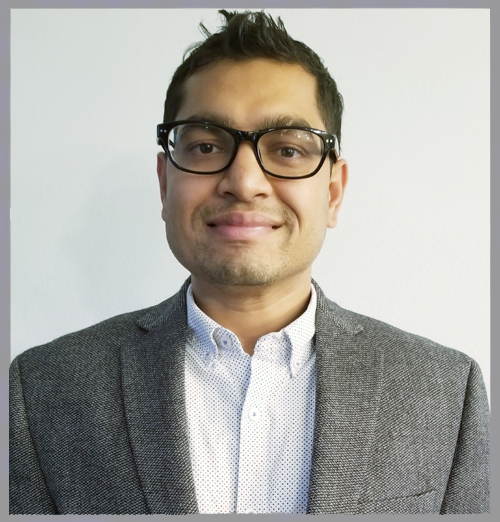
- Born: 1983 (age 42–43); Panchkhal, Kavrepalanchok, Nepal
- Education: Masters
- Alma mater: University of Wisconsin-Madison
- Occupation: Writer
- Notable work: Porridge Eaters and Gruel Drinkers; Ultimate Aakash

Santosh Lamichhane is a Nepali writer. He has authored a Nepali poetry collection, Porridge Eaters and Gruel Drinkers and a Nepali novel Ultimate Aakash.

== Early life and education ==
He was born in 1983 in Panchkhal, in the Kavre district of Nepal and he lived most of his adolescent years in Kathmandu. He has been living in the United States since 2002. He obtained his bachelor's degree in 2007 from the University of Texas at Arlington and his master's degree in 2011 from the University of Wisconsin-Madison. He currently lives in the United States.

== Literary career ==
Porridge Eaters and Gruel Drinkers has been listed in the US Library of Congress and Nepal's Madan Puraskar Pustakalaya (MPP) book archive. The book was published by Janamat Prakashan, Kavre, Nepal.

Ultimate Aakash was published by Samakalin Literary Academy, UK.

His poetry collection was released in 2014 in a literary function in Madison, Wisconsin, where he currently resides. The collection has some poems translated into English as well. His novel, Ultimate Aakash, was also released in Madison in 2018.

He was the president of Nepali American Friendship Association (NAFA), Madison, Wisconsin—a non-profit organization serving Nepalese in greater Madison area; for the 2017 to 2019 term.

He was also a producer and the scientific consultant for the Nepali feature film, Bijuli Machine.
