= Lifebox =

Non-profit organization

- Formation: 2011
- Founder: Atul Gawande
- Headquarters: England
- Global CEO: Kris Torgeson
- Website: https://www.lifebox.org/
- Remarks: Registered as a charity in England & Wales (#1143018)

The Lifebox Foundation, commonly known as Lifebox, is a non-profit organization that improves the safety of surgery in low-income countries.

== Background ==
Use of checklists in surgery reduces mortality by 24%, yet World Health Organization surgical checklists are published in Arabic, Chinese, English, French, Russian and Spanish and use of them is low in countries where people speak other languages, notably low-income countries.

== History ==
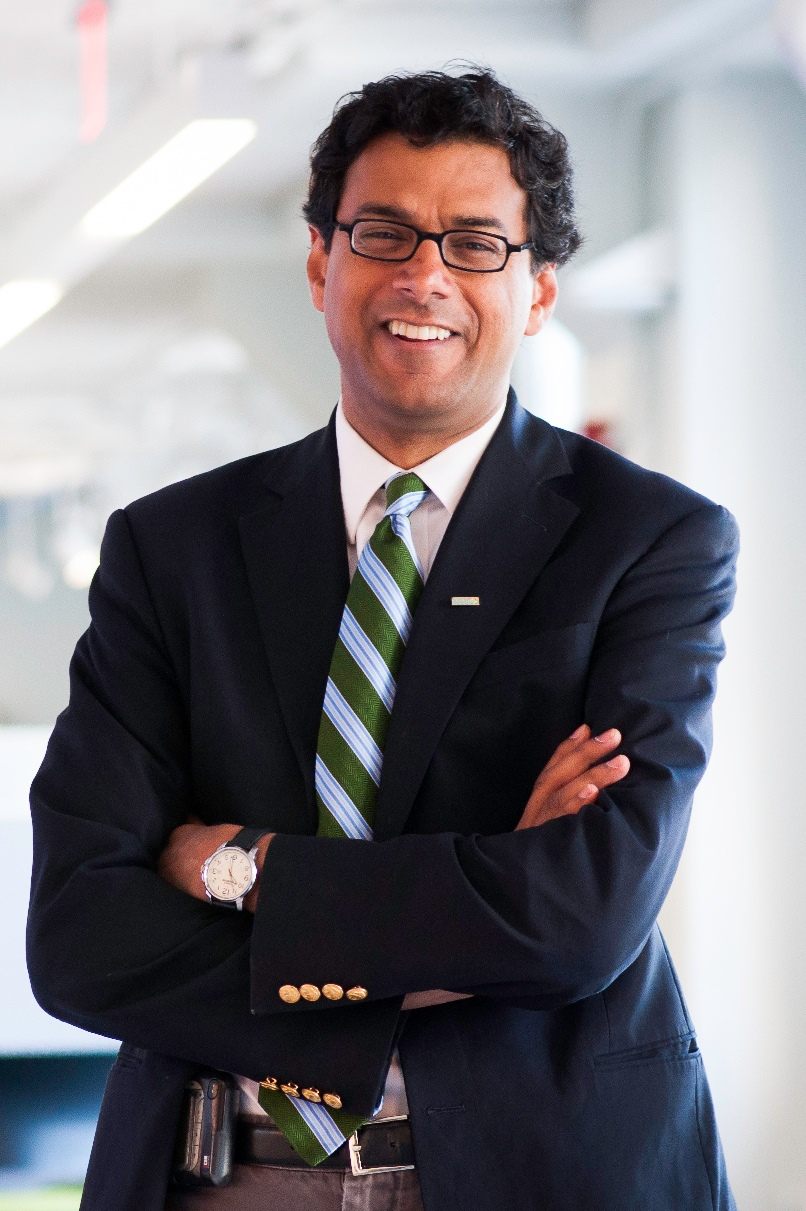
Atul Gawande

Lifebox was formed as a charity in the United Kingdom in 2011, and in the United States in 2015.

The original formation of the organization included representatives of World Federation of Societies of Anaesthesiologists, the Association of Anaesthetists of Great Britain and Ireland, and the Harvard School of Public Health.

From its foundation until 2022 Lifebox board was chaired by Atul Gawande. From 2022 until 2024 the board of Lifebox was chaired by Pauline Philip., and since 2024 has been chaired by Alex Hannenberg.

== Activities ==
The organization promotes the use of checklists before medical surgeries. Use of the checklists reduces surgical mortality and complications.

Lifebox organized hospitals to pool their purchasing power to reduce the cost of pulse oximeters from US$2,000 to $250, and distributed 22,000 hospital-grade pulse oximeters. Lifebox also provides anesthesia training.
