= Pauline Philip =

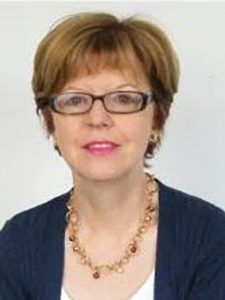
Pauline Philip

Dame Pauline Mary Philip, DBE, is a former nurse and an executive in the National Health Service in the UK.

She became the Chief Executive of Luton and Dunstable University Hospital NHS Foundation Trust in 2010. She previously worked for the World Health Organization. She was made an Honorary Dame Commander of the Order of the British Empire (DBE) in the 2017 Special Honours.

Philip was appointed the national urgent and emergency care lead by NHS England in 2016. Also n 2016, the Health Service Journal named her as the fifth most influential Chief Executive in the English National Health Service.

She has provided national leadership to ensure the delivery of the urgent and emergency care review and associated elements of the Five Year Forward View.

In 2023, Philip was appointed (with Professor Deirdre Kelly) to join the Board of Directors of Guy's and St Thomas' NHS Foundation Trust.

From 2022 to 2024, she was Chair of Lifebox, the charity founded with Atul Gawande.

On 20 July 2026, Philip's honorary damehood was made substantive.
