= Atul Gawande =

American surgeon (born 1965)

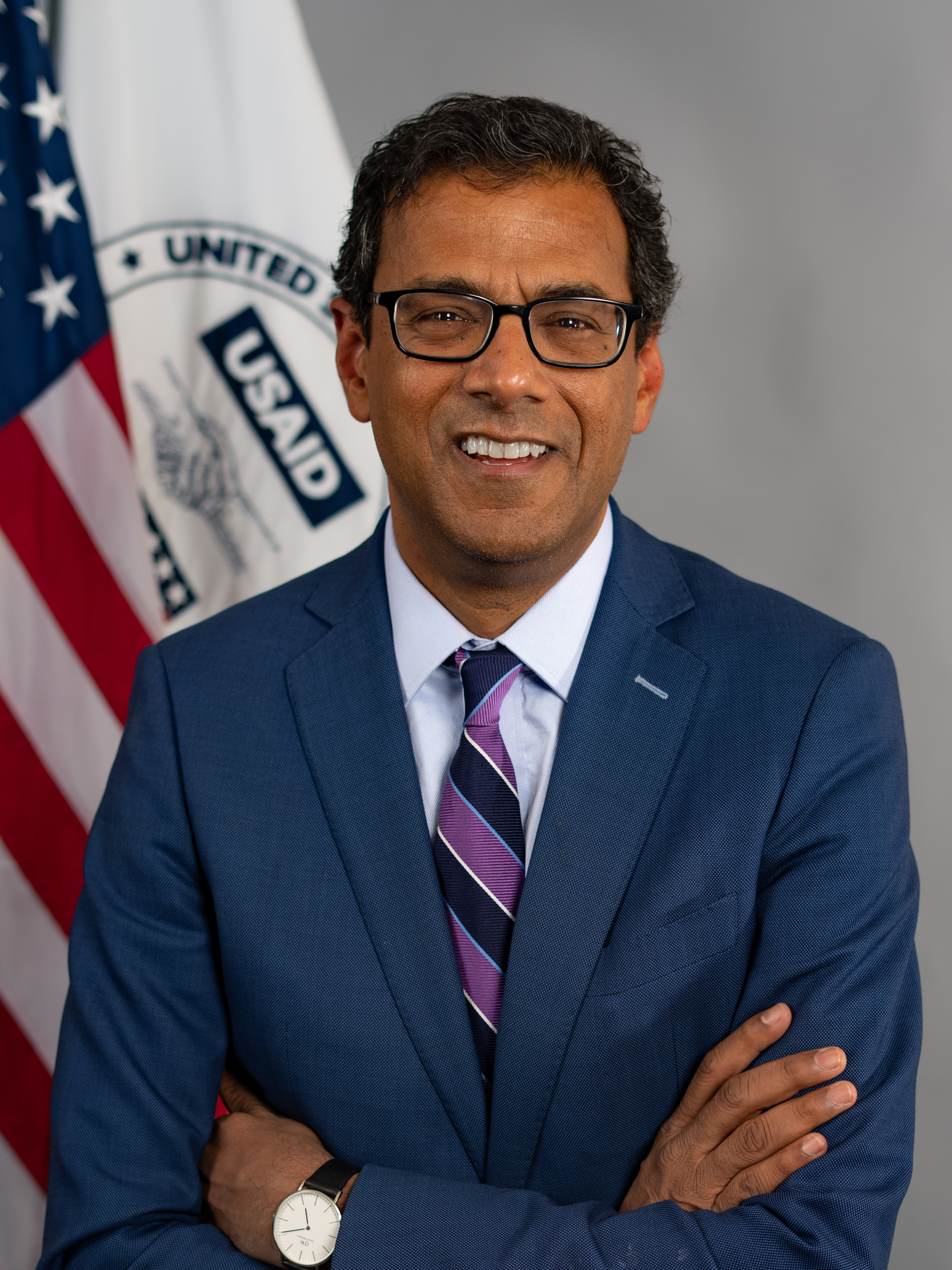

Assistant Administrator of the United States Agency for International Development for Global Health
- In office January 4, 2022 – January 20, 2025
- President: Joe Biden
- Preceded by: Alma Golden
- Succeeded by: TBD

Member of the COVID-19 Advisory Board
- In office November 9, 2020 – January 20, 2021
- Co-chairs: David A. Kessler, Vivek Murthy and Marcella Nunez-Smith
- Preceded by: Position established
- Succeeded by: Position abolished

Personal details
- Born: November 5, 1965 (age 60) New York City, U.S.
- Scientific career
- Education: Stanford University (BA, BS); Balliol College, Oxford (MA); Harvard University (MD, MPH)
- Awards: MacArthur Fellow (2006)
- Fields: Surgery, public health, healthcare
- Workplaces: Haven Healthcare; Harvard Medical School; Brigham and Women's Hospital
- Website: atulgawande.com; www.hsph.harvard.edu/atul-gawande

Atul Atmaram Gawande (born November 5, 1965) is an American surgeon, writer, and public health researcher. He practices general and endocrine surgery at Brigham and Women's Hospital in Boston, Massachusetts. He is a professor in the Department of Health Policy and Management at the Harvard T.H. Chan School of Public Health and the Samuel O. Thier Professor of Surgery at Harvard Medical School.

In public health, he was chairman of Ariadne Labs, a joint center for health systems innovation, and chairman of Lifebox, a nonprofit that works on reducing deaths in surgery globally. On 20 June 2018, Gawande was named CEO of healthcare venture Haven, owned by Amazon, Berkshire Hathaway, and JP Morgan Chase, and stepped down as CEO in May 2020, remaining as executive chairman while the organization sought a new CEO.

He is the author of the books Complications: A Surgeon's Notes on an Imperfect Science; Better: A Surgeon's Notes on Performance; The Checklist Manifesto; and Being Mortal: Medicine and What Matters in the End.

In November 2020, he was named a member of President-elect Joe Biden's COVID-19 Advisory Board. On 17 December 2021, he was confirmed as Assistant Administrator of the United States Agency for International Development, and was sworn in on 4 January 2022. He left this position on January 20, 2025, when Donald Trump began his second presidential term.

== Early life and education ==
Gawande was born on 5 November 1965 in Brooklyn, New York City, to Marathi Indian immigrants to the United States, both doctors. His family soon moved to Athens, Ohio, where he and his sister grew up, and he graduated from Athens High School in 1983.

Gawande earned a bachelor's degree in biology and political science from Stanford University in 1987. As a Rhodes Scholar, he earned an M.A. in Philosophy, Politics and Economics (PPE) from Balliol College, Oxford, in 1989. He graduated with a Doctor of Medicine from Harvard Medical School in 1995, and earned a Master of Public Health from the Harvard School of Public Health in 1999. He completed his general surgical residency training, again at the Harvard-affiliated Brigham and Women's Hospital, in 2003.

== Political advocacy ==
As an undergraduate, Gawande was a volunteer for Gary Hart's campaign for the presidency of the United States. After graduating, he joined Al Gore's 1988 presidential campaign. He worked as a health-care researcher for Representative Jim Cooper (D-TN), who was author of a "managed competition" health care proposal for the Conservative Democratic Forum. Gawande entered medical school in 1990, leaving after two years to become Bill Clinton's healthcare lieutenant during the 1992 campaign.

== Public service ==
Gawande later became a senior advisor in the Department of Health and Human Services after Clinton's first inauguration. He directed one of the three committees of the Clinton administration's Task Force on National Health Care Reform, supervising 75 people and defined the benefits packages for Americans and subsidies and requirements for employers. But the effort was attacked in the press, and Gawande later described this time in his life as frustrating, saying that "what I'm good at is not the same as what people who are good at leading agencies or running for office are really good at."

Gawande led the "Safe surgery saves lives checklist" initiative of the World Health Organization, which saw around 200 medical societies and health ministries collaborating to produce a checklist, which was published in 2008, to be used in operating theaters. The Lancet welcomed the checklist as "a tangible instrument to promote safety", adding "But the checklist is not an end in itself. Its real value lies in encouraging communication among teams and stimulating further reform to bring a culture of safety to the very centre of patients' care."

== Journalism ==
Soon after he began his residency, his friend Jacob Weisberg, editor of Slate, asked him to contribute to the online magazine. Several articles by Gawande were published in The New Yorker, and he was made a staff writer for that publication in 1998.

A June 2009 New Yorker essay by Gawande compared the health care of two towns in Texas to show why health care was more expensive in one town compared to the other. Using the town of McAllen, Texas, as an example, it argued that a corporate, profit-maximizing culture (which can provide substantial amounts of unnecessary care) was an important factor in driving up costs, unlike a culture of low-cost high-quality care as provided by the Mayo Clinic and other efficient health systems. The article "made waves" by highlighting the issue, according to Bryant Furlow in Lancet Oncology. It was cited by President Barack Obama during Obama's attempt to get health care reform legislation passed by the United States Congress. According to Senator Ron Wyden, the article "affected [Obama's] thinking dramatically", and was shown to a group of senators by Obama, who effectively said, "This is what we've got to fix." After reading the New Yorker article, Warren Buffett's long-time business partner Charlie Munger mailed a check to Gawande in the amount of $20,000 as a thank-you to Dr. Gawande for providing something so socially useful. Gawande returned the check and was subsequently sent a new check for $40,000. Gawande donated the $40,000 to the Brigham and Women's Hospital Center for Surgery and Public Health, where he had been a resident.

== Books ==
Gawande published his first book, Complications: A Surgeon's Notes on an Imperfect Science, containing revised versions of 14 of his articles for Slate and The New Yorker, in 2002. It was a National Book Award finalist.

His second book, Better: A Surgeon's Notes on Performance, was released in April 2007. It discusses three virtues that Gawande considers to be most important for success in medicine: diligence, doing right, and ingenuity. Gawande offers examples in the book of people who have embodied these virtues. The book strives to present multiple sides of contentious medical issues, such as malpractice law in the US, physicians' role in capital punishment, and treatment variation between hospitals.

Gawande released his third book, The Checklist Manifesto: How to Get Things Right, in 2009. It discusses the importance of organization and preplanning (such as thorough checklists) in both medicine and the larger world. The Checklist Manifesto reached the New York Times hardcover nonfiction bestseller list in 2010.

Being Mortal: Medicine and What Matters in the End was released in October 2014 and became a #1 New York Times bestseller. It discusses end of life choices about assisted living and the effect of medical procedures on terminally ill people. The book was the basis of a documentary for the PBS television series "Frontline", which was first broadcast on February 10, 2015.

== Later career ==
Gawande founded the Lifebox charity with Pauline Philip. He chaired the non-profit from its foundation in 2011 until 2022. Lifebox provides training and equipment for safer surgery.

In 2018, he was named the CEO for the new, Boston-based company, Haven Healthcare, formed by billionaire investor Warren Buffett, Amazon's Jeff Bezos, and JPMorgan Chase CEO Jamie Dimon. He stepped down from the position in May 2020, remaining as executive chairman while the organization sought a new CEO. In January 2021, Haven announced that it was to cease operations. According to CNBC, sources associated with the company claimed that "while the firm came up with ideas, each of the three founding companies executed their own projects separately with their own employees, obviating the need for the joint venture to begin with."

In 2020, he was named a member of President-elect Joe Biden's COVID-19 Advisory Board.

In 2021, President Biden nominated Gawande for the post of Assistant Administrator of U.S. AID for the Bureau of Global Health. Hearings were held on Gawande's nomination in the Senate Foreign Relations Committee on September 29, 2021. Florida Senator Marco Rubio delayed Gawande's committee vote in October 2021, claiming, "Atul Gawande's defense of infanticide is disqualifying... President Biden should withdraw Gawande's nomination and replace him with someone who is committed to upholding the agency's mission of saving lives." Senator Rubio's statement may stem from a 1998 article Gawande wrote defending partial-birth abortion as not significantly worse, morally speaking, than other late abortions. On November 3, 2021, the committee favorably reported Gawande's nomination to the Senate floor. The entire Senate confirmed Gawande on December 17, 2021, by a vote of 48–31.

Gawande stepped down from his post at USAID in January 2025. Working there since his appointment by President Biden, Gawande was featured in a New Yorker documentary, outlining the world wide consequences of the dismantling of USAID.

== Awards and honors ==
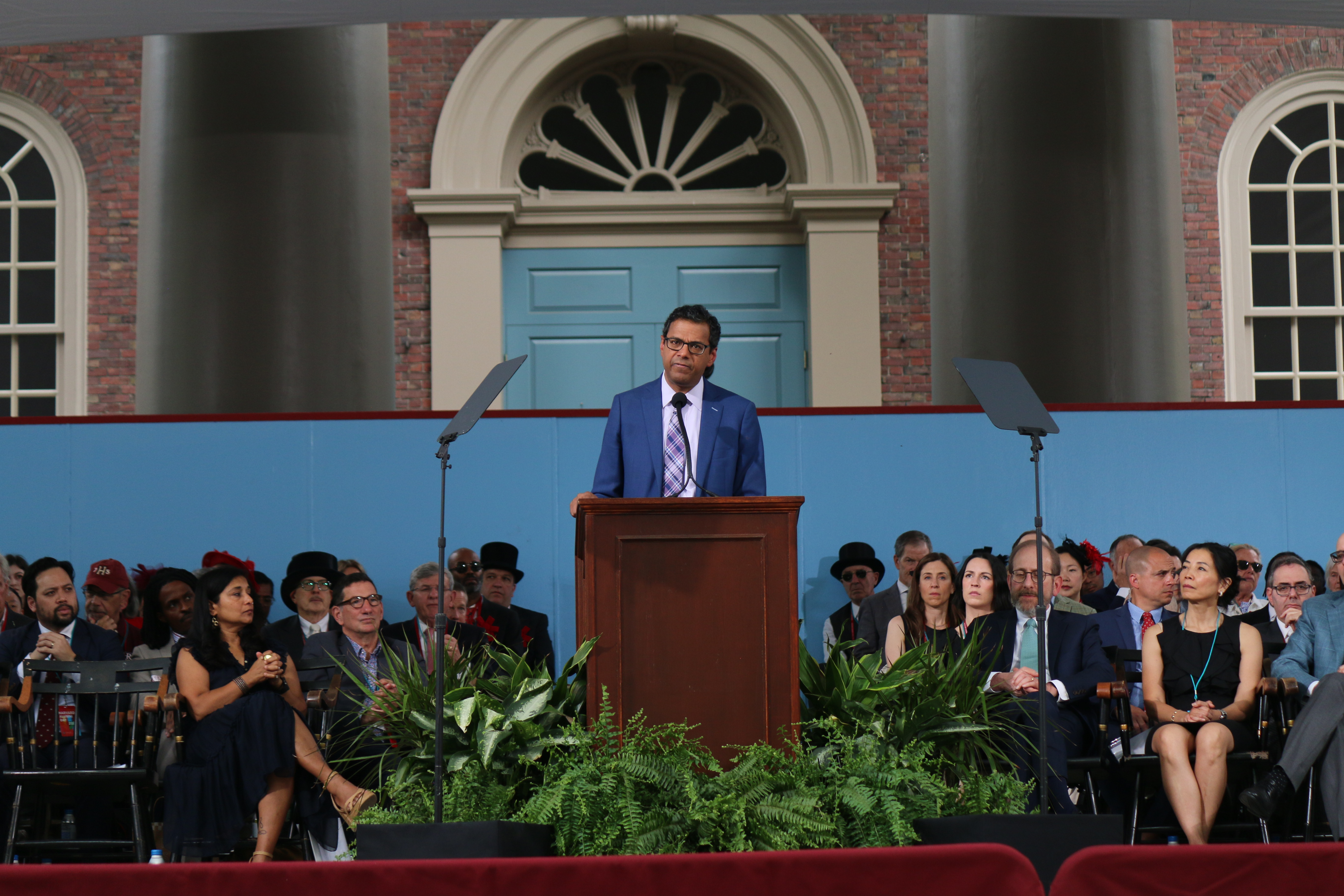
Gawande speaking at Harvard Alumni Day in 2025

In 2004, Gawande was selected as one of the "20 Most Influential South Asians" by Newsweek. In 2006, he was named a MacArthur Fellow for his work investigating and articulating modern surgical practices and medical ethics. In 2007, he became director of the World Health Organization's effort to reduce surgical deaths, and in 2009 he was elected a Hastings Center Fellow.

In the 2010 Time 100, he was included, in fifth place in the "Thinkers" category. The same year, he was he was included by Foreign Policy magazine on its list of top global thinkers. He was elected to the American Philosophical Society in 2012. In 2014, he presented the BBC's annual radio Reith Lectures, delivering a series of four talks titled The Future of Medicine. These were delivered in Boston, London, Edinburgh and Delhi. Also that year, he won the Lewis Thomas Prize for Writing about Science. In November 2016, he was one of three recipients of the Massachusetts Governor's Award in the Humanities for his contributions to improving civic life in Massachusetts. In May 2022 he was awarded an Honorary Doctor of Sciences by the University of Pennsylvania at their annual commencement ceremony.

== Bibliography ==
=== Books ===
- Gawande, Atul (2002). Complications: a surgeon's notes on an imperfect science. Picador.
- — (2008). Better: a surgeon's notes on performance. Picador.
- — (2009). The checklist manifesto. Metropolitan Books.
- — (2014). Being mortal: medicine and what matters in the end. Metropolitan Books.
