= Navina Evans =

British psychiatry consultant (born 1962)

Ahalia Navina Evans CBE is a British retired child and adolescent psychiatry consultant and healthcare administrator who was the Chief Workforce, Training & Education Officer of NHS England between 2023 and 2025. She was previously the chief executive officer of East London NHS Foundation Trust between 2016 and 2020 and chief executive of Health Education England between 2020 and 2023. Evans has been the Health Executive in Residence at the UCL Global Business School for Health since September 2025 and is a Visiting Professor at the University of Greater Manchester Medical School.

== Career ==
Evans was born in September 1962, grew up in Malaysia, and emigrated to the UK in her teenage years to study O‑Levels and A-levels. Her parents were teachers and she has one brother who is an artist. Evans studied medicine at Guy's Hospital Medical School, graduating in 1987. She developed an interest in child and adolescent psychiatry during medical school while on placement with consultant psychiatrist Dr Bob Jezzard. She joined East London NHS Foundation Trust (ELFT) initially as a specialty registrar before becoming a child and adolescent psychiatry consultant in 1997. Evans had applied for registrar posts elsewhere but felt that racism and sexism had limited her career opportunities. She later became the clinical director for the speciality and deputy chief executive and director of operations at the trust in 2011. Five years later, Evans was appointed as the trust's chief executive.

In 2020, she left ELFT to become the chief executive of Health Education England (HEE). Evans was the first and only Asian woman to lead HEE. She also became the interim Chief Workforce Officer of NHS England in June 2022. HEE merged with NHS England in 2023 and Evans became its Chief Workforce Training and Education Officer. She was also a board member of Think Ahead, an organisation which trains mental health social workers, and was previously an Honorary Senior Lecturer and Associate Dean at Barts and The London School of Medicine and Dentistry.

In February 2024, Evans wrote a letter of apology to the parents of Dr Vaish Kumar who died of suicide in June 2022. Kumar had been wrongly told in December 2021 by HEE that she had to complete a further six months of training at Queen Elizabeth Hospital Birmingham where she was being allegedly bullied and belittled by consultants. Evans stated, "I wish to unreservedly apologise for these mistakes and for the impact they would have had". In March 2024, the National Audit Office published a report on the modelling underpinning NHS England's Long Term Workforce Plan where they highlighted "significant weaknesses" citing a lack of integration between parts of the plan, manual adjustments used to adjust supply and demand which meant that the NAO could not replicate the modelling's results, and optimistic assumptions which did not take adequately account for uncertainties.

On 12 April 2024, NHS Practitioner Health, a national mental health support service for healthcare staff, announced that they would no longer be accepting new referrals from secondary care staff from 15 April as NHS England had withdrawn funding. The British Medical Association, a doctors' trade union, criticised the decision as a "short-sighted financial decision with potentially harmful consequences for both doctors and their patients". The Medical Defence Union, a healthcare professional indemnity provider, also commented that the decision was a "huge concern". On 15 April 2024, Evans announced that NHS England would continue to fund the service for another year after a direct intervention by Health Secretary Victoria Atkins. On September 2024, the contract was extended to March 2026.

Evans announced that she was leaving her position at NHS England in the summer of 2025. She received a redundancy payout of between £145,000 to £150,000. She joined UCL's Global Business School for Health as Health Executive in Residence from September 2025. Evans is also an Honorary Professor at Warwick Medical School and Visiting Professor at the University of Greater Manchester Medical School.

== Honours and personal life ==
Evans was made an Honorary Fellow at the Royal College of Psychiatrists in 2020. In the same year, she was awarded a CBE in the New Year Honours for services to NHS leadership and the Black, Asian and Minority Ethnic community.

She is married to Richard Evans who was deputy medical director at East London NHS Foundation Trust. They have no children.
