= The Checklist Manifesto =

2009 non-fiction book by Atul Gawande

- First edition
- Author: Atul Gawande
- Language: English
- Publisher: Metropolitan Books
- Publication date: December 22, 2009
- ISBN: 0805091742

The Checklist Manifesto: How to Get Things Right is a December 2009 non-fiction book by Atul Gawande. It was released on December 22, 2009, through Metropolitan Books and focuses on the use of checklists in relation to several elements of daily and professional life. The book looks at the use of checklists in the business world and the medical profession, with Gawande examining how they can be used for greater efficiency, consistency and safety. Gawande stated he was inspired to write The Checklist Manifesto after reading a story about a young child who survived a fall into a frozen pond and discovering that the physician who saved her relied heavily on checklists.

Critical reception for the book has been mostly positive, with Newsday calling it "thoughtfully written". The Seattle Times also gave a positive review.
