= Haven Healthcare =

American healthcare company

Haven
- Company type: Nonprofit organization
- Industry: Healthcare
- Founded: January 30, 2018; 8 years ago
- Defunct: February 28, 2021
- Headquarters: Boston, Massachusetts, United States
- Key people: Mitch Betses (COO and acting CEO)
- Owners: Amazon; Berkshire Hathaway; JPMorgan Chase
- Number of employees: 57 (2021)
- Website: havenhealthcare.care

Haven was a not-for-profit, healthcare-focused entity created through a joint venture by American companies Amazon, Berkshire Hathaway and JPMorgan Chase. The entity's stated goals were to improve healthcare services and lower costs for the three companies' employees, while making primary care easier to access, making prescription drugs more affordable and rendering insurance benefits easier to understand. The company was headquartered in Boston, Massachusetts, with offices in New York City.

Haven announced it would shut down in February 2021. Analysts cited hazy goals, a CEO inexperienced in operating a business, and competition with Amazon itself as likely causes for the company's failure.

== History ==
=== 2018 ===
On January 30, 2018, Amazon, Berkshire Hathaway, and JPMorgan Chase announced the formation of a company to provide low-cost and high quality healthcare for their more than a million worldwide employees. JPMorgan's Jamie Dimon said at the time of the announcement, "The three of our companies have extraordinary resources, and our goal is to create solutions that benefit our U.S. employees, their families and, potentially, all Americans." Berkshire Hathaway Chairman and CEO Warren Buffett described healthcare costs as "a hungry tapeworm on the American economy".

In June 2018, Atul Gawande was appointed as chief executive officer of Haven Healthcare.

In November 2018, Dana Gelb Safran, formerly of Blue Cross Blue Shield of Massachusetts, was hired as head of measurement. In December, the company hired David Smith, formerly of UnitedHealth Group's Optum subsidiary. His hiring resulted in Optum suing Smith for breach of contract, claiming that he had violated a non-compete restriction. In February 2019, District Judge Mark Wolf denied Optum's motion to stop Smith from working at Haven.

=== 2019 ===
In February 2019, Haven hired Serkan Kutan, former CTO of ZocDoc, as CTO.

In April 2019, the company announced that it was opening a second location in the Union Square area of Manhattan to focus on technology and engineering.

In May 2019, chief operating officer Jack Stoddard announced he was leaving his role after just nine months, noting that the commute between Philadelphia and Boston was taking him away from his family.

In November 2019, Haven announced they would partner with Cigna and CVS Health's Aetna to offer health plans to 30,000 J.P. Morgan workers in the states of Arizona and Ohio. Amazon would also be offering healthcare coverage to employees in Wisconsin, North Carolina, Utah, and Connecticut, in collaboration with an unnamed healthcare payer. The new wellness plan offered monthly financial rewards for meeting health and fitness goals.

=== 2020 ===
In May 2020, CEO Atul Gawande announced that he was leaving the company. COO Mitch Betses took over the day-to-day operations while the company looked for a new CEO.

=== Disbanded in 2021 ===
On January 4, 2021, Haven changed its website to a single page announcing that it would "end its independent operations at the end of February 2021."

The full three-paragraph message read:

In the past three years, Haven explored a wide range of healthcare
solutions, as well as piloted new ways to make primary care easier to
access, insurance benefits simpler to understand and easier to use, and
prescription drugs more affordable.

Moving forward, Amazon, Berkshire Hathaway, and JPMorgan Chase & Co.
will leverage these insights and continue to collaborate informally to design
programs tailored to address the specific needs of their own employee
populations.

Haven will end its independent operations at the end of February 2021.

At the time of the company’s disbandment, Haven had 57 employees in its Boston-based headquarters.

=== Reasons for failure ===
The venture never fully got off the ground, as a series of executives and consultants exited the company over the first few years of its existence. In considering why the entity failed, many observers believed the task of market disruption of the American health care system was too great.

The failure of the enterprise was largely based on the inability of Haven to gain sufficient market share to entice health care providers to lower their costs. According to Harvard Business Review, because both health insurers and providers are profitable under the current system, Haven was unable to force the market disruption it hoped to achieve. Because Haven had not yet achieved a strong market presence, it was also negatively impacted by the COVID-19 pandemic.

An additional hurdle to success was that each of the three founding business continued to individually pursue their own health care ventures, making the purpose of the joint venture unclear to employees and potential business partners.
