= Bijuli Machine =

- Movie Poster
- Directed by: Navin Awal
- Written by: Navin Awal
- Screenplay by: Navin Awal
- Produced by: Rishav Acharya Dipen Basnet; Sanjeev Neupane; Bindu Timilsina; Santosh Lamichhane Sound Design&Mix: Uttam Neupane
- Starring: Abhishek Subedi; Jeewan Adhikary; Reliza Shrestha; Buddhi Tamang; Rajesh Hamal; Rabi Giri; Laxmi Bhusal; Akash Magar
- Cinematography: Hari Humagain
- Music by: Rohit Shakya
- Production company: Universal Nepal
- Release date: 2 December 2016
- Country: Nepal
- Language: Nepali
- Budget: NRS 95Lakh

Bijuli Machine is a 2016 Nepali film directed by Navin Awal and produced by Rishav Acharya, Santosh Lamichhane, Bindu Timilsina, Sanjeev Neupane, and Navin Awal. The film revolves around two teenage friends who set out to solve Nepal's chronic “load-shedding” problem with the innovation of a unique ‘Bijuli Machine’. Santosh Lamichhane is also the Science Advisor for the film. The film released on Mangsir 17, 2073 B.S. i..e December 2, 2016.

The movie has been called a science-fiction film with a social story. Its teaser and trailer created positive response. In an interview, writer and director Navin Awal, mentioned that although he and the Scientific Consultant Santosh Lamichhane worked to make the movie scientifically logical, the movie is more a metaphor, that the voice of youth has the true energy and it should not be ignored, that every innovation begins with an imagination and perseverance against all unfavorable odds is what makes dream a reality.

Reviewers commented favourably on the film, its lack of stereotypical elements, and praising its authenticity. The film was screened in Germany and the United States and received a positive response. On June 13, 2017, the film was selected for screening at the Regina International Film Festival in Regina, Saskatchewan, Canada.

On August 7, 2017, Bijuli Machine won The Most Commendable Movie of the Year 2017 at the LG Cine Circle Awards in Nepal founded by Dinesh D.C. On August 16, 2017, Nepal's Oscar selection secretariat announced that Seto Surya (Dipak Rauniyar) and Bijuli Machine were being considered for Nepal's official entry for best foreign-language feature film at the 90th Academy Awards.

Bijuli Machine was selected as an opening film at the 2017 Tasveer South Asian Film Festival, Seattle and won best narrative film. It also screened at Singapore South Asian International Film Festival and got selected to Chicago South Asian Film Festival.

== Cast ==
- Abhishek Subedi
- Jeewan Adhikary
- Buddhi Tamang
- Ashesh Luitel
- Jiban Bhattarai
- Reliza Shrestha
- Rajesh Hamal
