= Marcus Smith (judge) =

British judge

The Honourable Mr Justice Marcus Smith
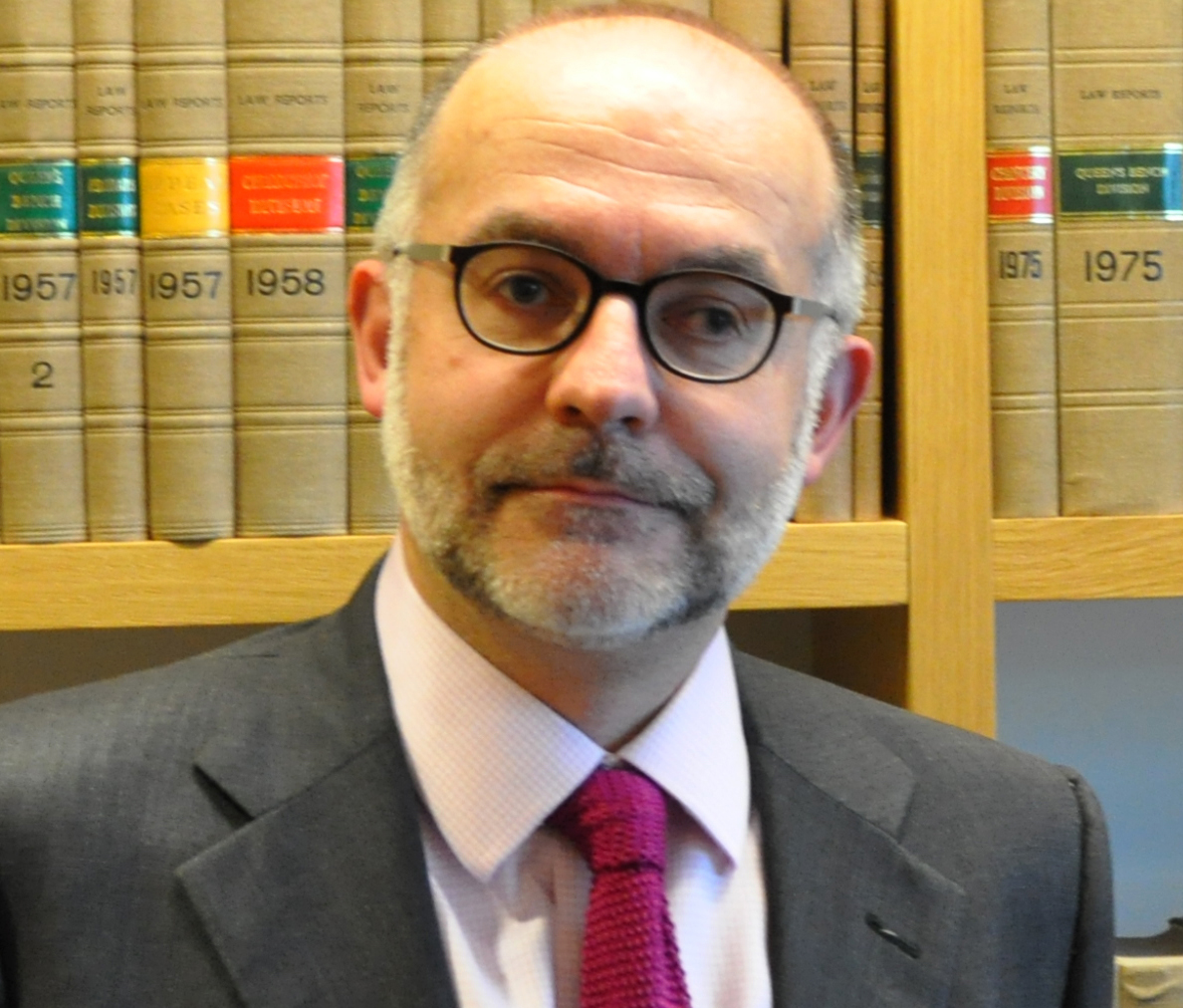
- Smith in 2017

Justice of the High Court
- In office 12 January 2017 – 4 November 2024
- Succeeded by: Sir Peter Roth (acting)

Competition Appeals Tribunal

President
- Incumbent
- Assumed office 2021
- Monarchs: Elizabeth II; Charles III

Personal details
- Born: 1 July 1967 (age 59) United Kingdom
- Education: Balliol College, Oxford

Sir Marcus Alexander Smith (born 1 July 1967) is a British High Court judge.

== Personal life and education ==
Smith was educated at Balliol College, Oxford, completing a BA in 1988 and a BCL in 1990. He also attended LMU Munich.

In 1998, he married Louise Merrett, with whom he has one son and one daughter.

== Career ==
He was called to the bar at Lincoln's Inn in 1991 and practised commercial and regulatory law from Fountain Court Chambers, where he also completed his pupillage. From 1991 to 1994, he was a lecturer in law at Balliol. In addition to practice, he wrote two textbooks: Private International Law of Reinsurance and Insurance with Raymond Cox QC and Louise Merrett (2006) and The Law of Assignment with Nico Leslie (2007, 3rd edition 2018).

He was a part-time Chair of the Competition Appeal Tribunal in 2009 and was appointed King's Counsel in 2010.

=== High Court appointment ===
On 12 January 2017, he was appointed as a High Court judge and assigned to the Chancery Division. He received his customary Knight Bachelor in the same year.

He is on the Financial List, the Patents Court, the Upper Tribunal (Tax and Chancery) and the Administrative Court. From 2019 to 2021, he was the Business and Property Courts Supervising Judge for the Midlands and Western circuit.

On 9 August 2024, he was issued with a reprimand for serious misconduct by the Lady Chief Justice and the Lord Chancellor for giving a love letter to a junior member of staff.

Competition Appeals Tribunal

In November 2021, he was appointed President of the Competition Appeals Tribunal. On 4 November 2024, his term of office as President of the Competition Appeals Tribunal ended and was not renewed. He was replaced by Sir Peter Roth as acting President until his permanent replacement, Dame Kelyn Bacon, was announced on 23 May 2025.
