= Clare Moulder =

British former High Court judge

The Honourable Dame Clare Moulder
- Royal coat of arms of the United Kingdom

High Court Judge
- In office 2 October 2017 – 26 October 2022
- Monarchs: Elizabeth II; Charles III

Personal details
- Born: United Kingdom
- Education: Clare College, Cambridge

Dame Jane Clare Moulder is a British former High Court judge.

Moulder attended Cheltenham Ladies' College and Aylesbury High School. She studied law at Clare College, Cambridge. In 1984, she was admitted as a solicitor. She joined Linklaters in 1982, specialising in capital markets, and was made partner in 1991.

In 2010, she was appointed a recorder and a deputy High Court judge in 2013. In 2015, she was appointed a specialist mercantile circuit judge.

On 2 October 2017, she was appointed a judge of the High Court and assigned to the King's Bench Division; she sat in the Commercial Court. She received the customary damehood in the same year. On 26 October 2022, she retired from the High Court.

Following retirement from the Commercial Court, Moulder has continued to hear cases as a judge sitting in the High Court of Justice Business and Property Courts of England And Wales, King's Bench Division, Commercial Court.
