= Luton and Dunstable University Hospital NHS Foundation Trust =

NHS hospital trust

Luton and Dunstable University Hospital NHS Foundation Trust was an NHS foundation trust which ran Luton and Dunstable University Hospital. The trust acquired Bedford Hospital NHS Trust on 1 April 2020, forming Bedfordshire Hospitals NHS Foundation Trust.

== Governance ==
The trust was run by a Board of Directors, made up of Non-Executive Directors and Chairman, a Chief Executive and Executive Directors. The last Chief Executive was David Carter, who took up the post in February 2018.

== Statistics ==
In the financial year 2007–2008, the Trust employed over 3400 staff, and had an annual spend of £169 million. In the same year the Trust handled:

- Over 60,000 in-patient admissions;
- Over 200,000 out-patient appointments;
- Over 61,000 attendances at the A&E department;
- Over 5,000 births.

== Technology ==
The Luton and Dunstable Hospital NHS Trust has announced that it has been provided with a new speech driven system, the ContactPortal by Telephonetics, to improve call management and communications at the Trust. On average the Trust takes over 4000 phone calls per day from outside, plus thousands more internally. The ContactPortal acts as a virtual operator 24 hours a day, using speech recognition technology to answer, transfer and make telephone calls.

In September 2016, the trust was selected by NHS England as one of twelve Global Digital Exemplars.

== Development ==
Galliford Try were appointed the preferred supply chain partner for the £150 million redevelopment of Luton hospital including a new £80m ‘hot block’ unit for critical care and surgery in October 2015.

The trust was one of the biggest beneficiaries of Boris Johnson's announcement of capital funding for the NHS in August 2019, with an allocation of £99.5 million for a new intensive care, a delivery suite and operating theatres.

== See also ==
- Healthcare in Bedfordshire
