= Keech Hospice Care =

Coordinates: 51.9279°N 0.4386°W

Keech Hospice

Geography
- Location: Luton, Bedfordshire, England

Links
- Lists: Hospitals in England

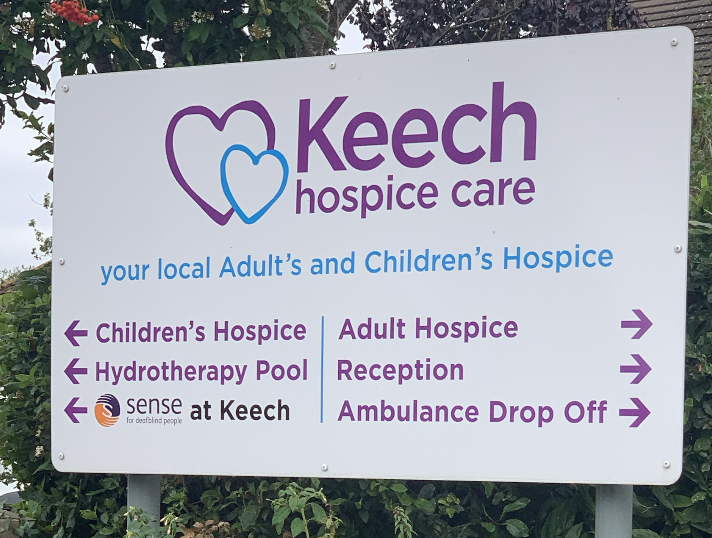
Sign outside Hospice

Keech Hospice is a hospice in Luton, England. It provides care specifically for terminally ill children in Bedfordshire, Hertfordshire and Milton Keynes, but also focuses on older terminally ill patients in Luton and South Bedfordshire. It has been commended for its work and has also seen notable fund raising events in the past.

In October 2009 after almost ten years as being known as "Keech Cottage Children's Hospice", along with its sister and main hospice "The Pasque Charity", it became known as Keech Hospice Care.
