= Bedfordshire Hospitals NHS Foundation Trust =

NHS foundation trust

- Type: NHS foundation trust
- Established: 1 April 2020
- Headquarters: Kempston Road, Bedford, MK42 9DJ
- Hospitals: Bedford Hospital; Luton and Dunstable University Hospital
- Chair: Richard Sumray
- Chief executive: David Carter
- Staff: Approximately 8,000
- Website: www.bedfordshirehospitals.nhs.uk

Bedfordshire Hospitals NHS Foundation Trust is an NHS foundation trust formed on 1 April 2020. It runs Bedford Hospital and Luton and Dunstable University Hospital.

== History ==
The trust was formed on 1 April 2020 by the acquisition of Bedford Hospital NHS Trust by Luton and Dunstable University Hospital NHS Foundation Trust.

== Services ==
Both sites at Bedford and Luton possess an Emergency Department and Women & Children's Health unit, with the addition of a dedicated Paediatric Emergency Department at Luton.
