= Martin Spencer =

British judge

The Honourable Mr Justice Martin Spencer
- Royal coat of arms of the United Kingdom

High Court Judge King's Bench Division
- Incumbent
- Assumed office 2 October 2017
- Monarch: Charles III

Personal details
- Born: 19 June 1956 (age 70) United Kingdom
- Education: Hertford College, Oxford

Sir Martin Benedict Spencer (born 19 June 1956) is a British High Court judge.

Spencer was educated at Hertford College, Oxford where he completed an MA and the BCL. He was called to the bar at the Inner Temple in 1979, practising from Hailsham Chambers from 1981 where he was head of chambers from 2009 to 2016. He took silk in 2003 and served as a recorder from 2011 to 2017.

On 2 October 2017, he was appointed a judge of the High Court and assigned to the Queen's Bench Division. He took the customary knighthood in the same year. From 2017, he serves as chair of the Expert Witness Institute and since 2019 serves on the Judicial Security Committee.

In 1977, he married Lisbet Steengaard Jensen, with whom he has two sons and a daughter.
