= Navin Awal =

Nepalese film director

Navin Awal is a Nepali film director and writer. He has directed hundreds of ad films, a short film; 1 Percent and the first Nepali science fiction movie with a social story, Bijuli Machine.

Awal is the creative director at Silhouette Media, Nepal.
