= David Williams (English judge) =

British judge

The Honourable Mr Justice David Williams
- Royal coat of arms of the United Kingdom

Justice of the High Court
- Incumbent
- Assumed office 2 October 2017

Personal details
- Born: 18 June 1964 (age 62) Bedford, England
- Education: University of Leicester

Sir David Basil Williams (born 18 June 1964) is a British High Court judge.

== Early life and education ==
He was born in Bedford and educated at Cedars Upper School in Leighton Buzzard. He completed an LLB at the University of Leicester and the BVC at the Inns of Court School of Law.

== Career ==
From 1986 to 1989, he was an executive officer at the Legal Aid Board. In 1990, he was called to the bar at the Inner Temple. He practised from 3 Dr Johnson's Buildings from 1990 to 2000 and 4 Paper Buildings from 2000 to 2017 and specialised in family law. He took silk in 2013 and served as a recorder from 2016 to 2017. He has been a contributing editor of Butterworths Family Law Service since 2012, and editor of Rayden and Jackson since 2015.

=== High Court appointment ===
On 2 October 2017, he was appointed a judge of the High Court and assigned to the Family Division. He took the customary knighthood in the same year. Williams became more widely known to the public when he ruled in 2024 that the media could not name three judges involved in the historical family court cases related to murdered child Sara Sharif, as well as social workers and guardians, due to a "real risk" of harm to them from a "virtual lynch mob". However, several media organisations, including the BBC, appealed against the decision in January 2025, arguing that the judges should be named in the interests of transparency; the Court of Appeal agreed, and described Williams' original ruling as "misguided".

== Personal life and politics ==
In 2000, he married Siobhan Hoy, with whom he has two sons and a daughter. A member of the Labour Party since 1987, he stood as the Labour candidate for Wycombe constituency in 2015, coming second to Steve Baker.
