= Luton and Dunstable University Hospital =

- Bedfordshire Hospitals NHS Foundation Trust
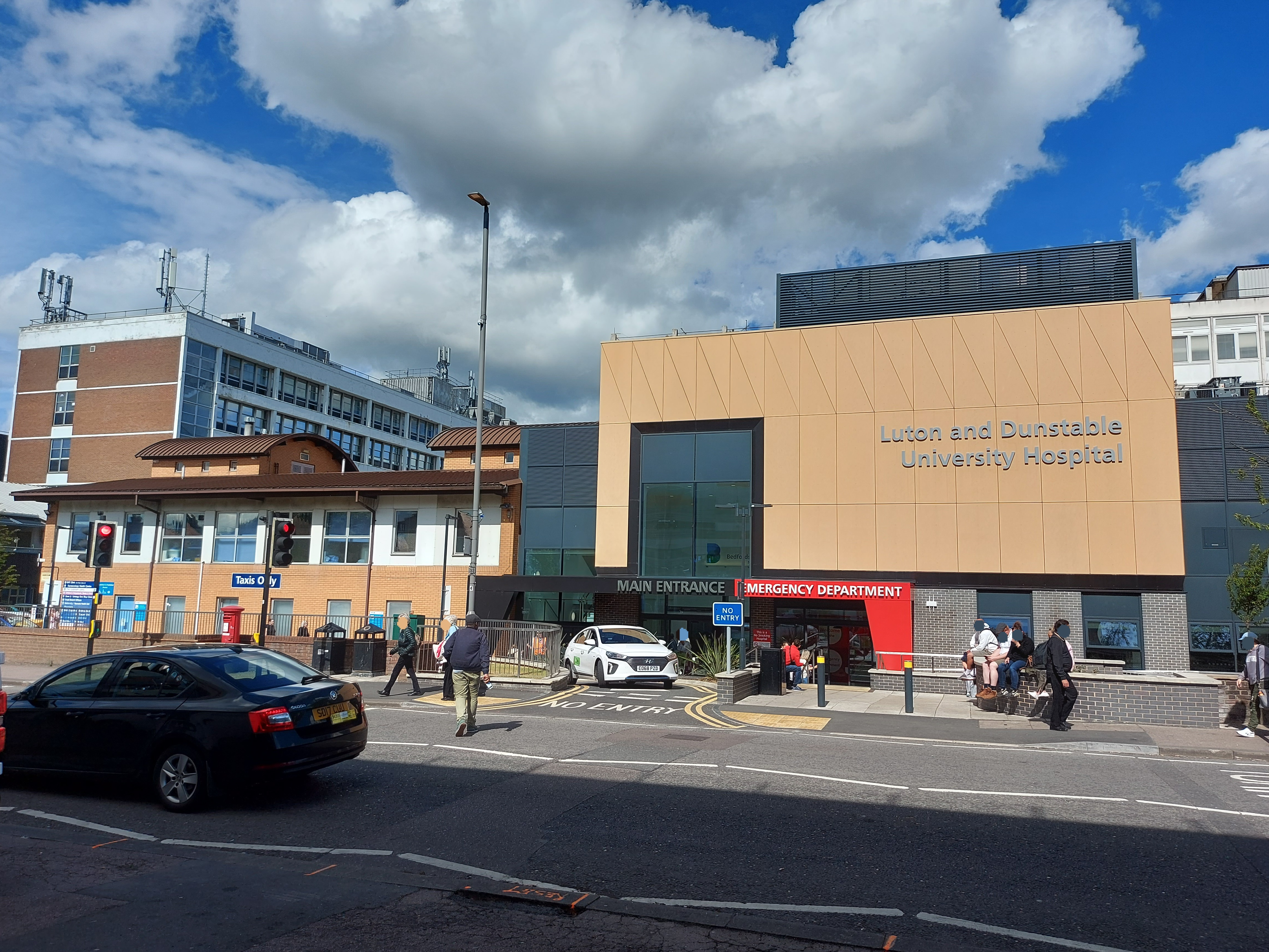
- Main entrance

- Shown in Bedfordshire

Geography
- Location: Lewsey Road, Luton, Bedfordshire, England
- Coordinates: 51.894°N 0.474°W

Organisation
- Care system: National Health Service
- Type: Teaching
- Affiliated university: University College London

Services
- Emergency department: Yes
- Beds: 695 (Trustwide, Quarter 1, 2017)

History
- Founded: 1939

Links
- Website: www.bedfordshirehospitals.nhs.uk/patients-visitors/information-for-patients-visitors-luton-and-dunstable-university-hospital/

Luton and Dunstable University Hospital is an acute care hospital in Luton, Bedfordshire, England, run by Bedfordshire Hospitals NHS Foundation Trust. It provides medical and surgical services for over 350,000 people in southern Bedfordshire, the north of Hertfordshire and parts of Buckinghamshire. The hospital is often abbreviated to the 'L&D', and employs 3,400 staff.

== History ==
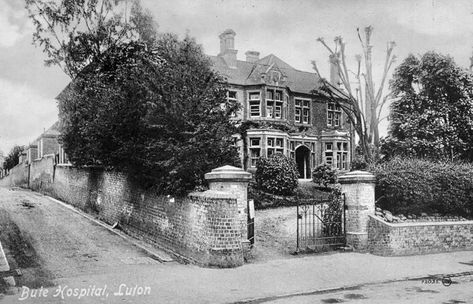
The old Bute Hospital in Luton

The hospital has its origins in the Bute Hospital, which was built on land donated by the Marquis of Bute (who lived locally at Luton Hoo) on Dunstable Road in Luton and which opened in September 1882. Although the facility was enlarged by two new wards in July 1902 and by a further extension in July 1912 there was little room for further expansion.

Ten acres of land, situated in the countryside between Luton and Dunstable were purchased from Electrolux and work on a new hospital started. The hospital was designed by Parrott & Dunham, built by a local contractor, H. C. Janes, and opened by Queen Mary on 14 February 1939. The wards in the new hospital were named after Queen Mary, Lady Ludlow from Luton Hoo and Arthur Buckingham, a Dunstable grocer who had bequeathed £4,000 towards the cost of the hospital.

The hospital joined the National Health Service in 1948. The Duchess of Gloucester visited the Disability Resource Centre in July 1996 and Princess Anne opened the new St Mary's Wing Rehabilitation Centre in February 2003.

After the facility became a teaching hospital for University College London in March 2012, the Duke of Edinburgh opened a new state-of-the-art cardiac centre there in February 2013.

== Patient safety ==
Luton and Dunstable has been a Safer Patient Initiative site since 2004. Reducing the hospital's mortality rate was a priority for Chief Executive Stephen Ramsden, who believed that saving patient lives must be at the top of all chief executives' agendas. Stephen Ramsden was appointed the director of the National Patient Safety Campaign, after the hospital won the Health Foundation's Safer Patients Initiative. He also received an OBE for services to healthcare.

99% of A&E patients are treated within the target 4 hours. A BBC article maintains other hospitals can learn from Luton and Dunstable.

It was named by the Health Service Journal as one of the top hundred NHS trusts to work for in 2015. At that time it had 3,323 full-time equivalent staff and a sickness absence rate of 3.25%. 67% of staff recommend it as a place for treatment and 60% recommended it as a place to work.

== CQC evaluation ==
The Care Quality Commission rated Luton and Dunstable Hospital as "good" overall in June 2016.

== See also ==
- Healthcare in Bedfordshire
- List of hospitals in England
- List of NHS trusts
