= Peter Roth (judge) =

British judge

The Honourable Sir Peter Roth
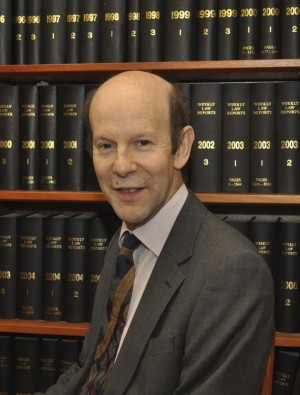
- Roth in 2015

Justice of the High Court
- Incumbent
- Assumed office 2009
- Appointed by: Elizabeth II

Competition Appeal Tribunal President
- In office 2013–2021
- Monarchs: Elizabeth II; Charles III

Personal details
- Born: Peter Marcel Roth; 19 December 1952 (age 73)
- Education: New College, Oxford (BA); University of Pennsylvania (LLM)

Sir Peter Marcel Roth is a British High Court judge.

== Education ==
Educated at St Paul's School, London, Roth read history at New College, Oxford, and obtained the degree of LLM from the University of Pennsylvania Law School in 1977.

== Career ==
Roth was a member of Monckton Chambers, a set of barristers' chambers specialising in commercial and competition law, located in Gray's Inn and founded by Walter Monckton, 1st Viscount Monckton of Brenchley. He was called to the bar at Middle Temple in 1977 and elected a Bencher in 2008. He was appointed Queen's Counsel in 1997, a deputy judge of the High Court from 2008 to 2009, and judge of the High Court of Justice (Chancery Division) in 2009.

He received his customary knighthood from Queen Elizabeth II in February 2010.

In 2013, Roth was appointed President of the Competition Appeal Tribunal. He retired from the position in 2021.

He was a visiting professor at King's College London from 2003 to 2009.

== Personal life ==
In 2010, Roth married Tessa Margaret Buchanan. He has one daughter, one step-son and one step-daughter.

On New Year's Day 2017, Roth's Knight Bachelor and insignia medal were stolen from his home in Primrose Hill. The burglar also stole a family heirloom, bank cards, car keys and jewellery. A man was arrested but later acquitted at trial due to lack of evidence. The items, including the original insignia medal, have never been recovered.
