= East London NHS Foundation Trust =

- Former name: East London and The City University Mental Health NHS Trust
- Type: NHS foundation trust
- Established: 1 November 2007
- Headquarters: 9 Alie Street; London; E1 8DE
- Chair: Eileen Taylor
- Chief executive: Lorraine Sunduza OBE
- Staff: 7,729 (2022/23)
- Website: www.elft.nhs.uk

East London NHS Foundation Trust is an NHS foundation trust offering various mental health, community, primary care, and inpatient services for children and adults in East London, Bedfordshire and Luton.

== History ==
The trust was established as the East London and The City Mental Health NHS Trust on 3 March 2000, and became operational on 1 April 2000. The Trust was granted university status in April 2007, due to its extensive research and educational efforts, renaming to East London and The City University Mental Health Trust. A few months later, it became a foundation trust on 1 November 2007, changing its name once more.

In May 2013 the Trust took over the Health E1 clinic in Brick Lane which had been run by nursing staff with GPs and other specialist nurses for those who couldn't register with a practice because they had no settled address.

In October 2013 Lerone Michael Boye – who murdered a teenager in 2011 – absconded from the Trust's John Howard Centre. Dean Ablakwa, 29, a member of staff at the Centre, was charged with conspiracy to assist an offender escape from lawful custody.

The Trust introduced changes to its Datix system for incident reporting in 2014 to make it more useful. It now gives feedback to the original reporter about actions taken to address their concerns, and there are dashboards in Datix to allow services to view trends in incidents over time, and integrate incident data with other quality data, which staff can access from any computer.

The Trust took over running mental health services in Bedfordshire on 1 April 2015 with a seven-year contract from the clinical commissioning groups in Luton and Bedfordshire. In November 2017 it won a £195 million five year contract to provide community health services in Bedfordshire.

350 staff moved from Barts Health NHS Trust in April 2017 to a partnership between Tower Hamlets GP Care Group Community Interest Company and the East London trust which is intended to keep patients out of hospital and provide more care in their homes. This is called 'early intervention'.

By prioritising investments in community mental health services the trust has reduced its need for secondary beds and reserved a ward for out of area placements from other trusts, which brought in more than £9 million revenue in 2018-9.

== Performance ==
It was awarded Trust of the Year at the Patient Safety Awards 2015 and winner of the Staff Engagement Award at the Health Service Journal awards in 2015. It was also named by the Health Service Journal as the best mental health trust to work for in 2015. At that time it had 3470 full-time equivalent staff and a sickness absence rate of 3.84%. 72% of staff recommend it as a place for treatment and 73% recommended it as a place to work. In August 2016 it was rated outstanding by the Care Quality Commission following a two-week assessment in June making it the only mental health and community health trust in London and the East of England to be rated as 'Outstanding'. The trust was inspected again in 2018 and in 2022; their CQC rating was unchanged. This is the first trust in England to be rated 'outstanding' three times. Inspectors reported an "overwhelmingly positive" culture across the trust.

== See also ==
- List of NHS trusts
