= List of ship launches in 1960 =

The list of ship launches in 1960 includes a chronological list of all ships launched in 1960.

	Ship	Class / type	Builder	Location	Country	Notes
15 January	William Wheelwright	Tanker	Harland & Wolff	Belfast	United Kingdom	For Pacific Steam Navigation Company.
18 January	Arctic Cavalier	Trawler	Cook, Welton & Gemmell	Beverley	United Kingdom	For Boyd Line.
30 January	John King	Charles F. Adams-class destroyer	Bath Iron Works	Bath, Maine	United States	
4 February	B.P. Al-Rhoda	Tank barge	J. Bolson & Son Ltd.	Poole	United Kingdom	For BP (Aden) Ltd.
13 February	Onami	Ayanami-class destroyer			Japan	
15 February	Habana	Cargo ship	Atlantic Shipbuilding Co. Ltd	Newport	United Kingdom	For Oficina de Fomento Maritimo Cubano.
27 February	Lawrence	Charles F. Adams-class destroyer	New York Shipbuilding	Camden, New Jersey	United States	
29 February	Arctic Corsair	Trawler	Cook, Welton & Gemmell	Beverley, East Yorkshire	United Kingdom	for Boyd Line
1 March	Tresfonn	Bulk carrier	Harland & Wolff	Belfast	United Kingdom	For Sigval Bergsen.
6 March	William V. Pratt	Farragut-class destroyer	Philadelphia Naval Shipyard	Philadelphia, Pennsylvania	United States	
10 March	Barpeta	Cargo ship	Harland & Wolff	Belfast	United Kingdom	For British India Steam Navigation Company.
16 March	Royalist	Trawler	Cook, Welton & Gemmell	Beverley, East Yorkshire	United Kingdom	for Hewett Fishing Company
16 March	Dahlgren	Farragut-class destroyer	Philadelphia Naval Shipyard	Philadelphia, Pennsylvania	United States	
16 March	Shark	Skipjack-class submarine	Newport News Shipbuilding	Newport News, Virginia	United States	
16 March	Canberra	Ocean liner	Harland and Wolff	Belfast	United Kingdom	For P&O
20 March	Eskimo	Tribal-class frigate	J. Samuel White	Cowes, Isle of Wight	United Kingdom	
26 March	Hamburg	Hamburg-class destroyer	H. C. Stülcken Sohn	Hamburg	West Germany	For German Navy
29 March	Plumleaf	Leaf-class tanker	Blyth Dry Docks & Shipbuilding Co. Ltd	Blyth, Northumberland	United Kingdom	For Royal Fleet Auxiliary.
31 March	Sculpin	Skipjack-class submarine	Ingalls Shipbuilding	Pascagoula, Mississippi	United States	
5 April	Prinsesse Anne-Marie	ferry	Aalborg Værft A/S	Ålborg	Denmark	For Danske Statsbaner.
13 April	Arlanza	Refrigerated cargo liner	Harland & Wolff	Belfast	United Kingdom	For Royal Mail Lines.
25 April	Makinami	Ayanami-class destroyer			Japan	
27 April	Robison	Charles F. Adams-class destroyer	Defoe Shipbuilding Company	Bay City, Michigan	United States	
27 April	Tullibee	Unique nuclear-powered submarine	Electric Boat	Groton, Connecticut	United States	
28 April	Eisvogel	Eisvogel-class Icebreaker	Hitzler Werft	Lauenburg	West Germany	For German Navy
April	ADDSCO	Towboat	Alabama Drydock and Shipbuilding Company	Mobile, Alabama	United States	For Alabama Drydock and Shipbuilding Company.
5 May	Elbe		Schlieker-shipyard	Hamburg	West Germany	For German Navy
10 May	Empress of Canada	Ocean liner	Vickers-Armstrongs		United Kingdom	For Canadian Pacific Steamships
11 May	Buchanan	Charles F. Adams-class destroyer	Todd Pacific Shipyards	Seattle, Washington	United States	
11 May	France	Ocean liner	Chantiers de l'Atlantique	Saint-Nazaire	France	For Compagnie Générale Transatlantique
14 May	Abraham Lincoln	George Washington-class submarine	Portsmouth Naval Shipyard	Kittery, Maine	United States	
14 May	Doris	Daphné-class submarine	Direction des Constructions et Armes Navales	Cherbourg	France	For French Navy
21 May	Kitty Hawk	Kitty Hawk-class aircraft carrier	New York Shipbuilding	Camden, New Jersey	United States	
21 May	Sampson	Charles F. Adams-class destroyer	Bath Iron Works	Bath, Maine	United States	
25 May	Daghestan	Ore carrier	Harland & Wolff	Belfast	United Kingdom	For Hindustan Shipping Co.
9 June	Eisbär	Eisvogel-class icebreaker	Hitzler Werft	Lauenburg	West Germany	For German Navy
10 June	Devonshire	County-class destroyer	Cammell Laird	Birkenhead	United Kingdom	
14 June	Claude V. Ricketts	Charles F. Adams-class destroyer	New York Shipbuilding	Camden, New Jersey	United States	
23 June	Icenic	Refrigerated cargo ship	Harland & Wolff	Belfast	United Kingdom	For Shaw Savill Line.
6 July	Vendome	Coaster	Brazen Island Shipyard Ltd.	Polruan	United Kingdom	For Lockett Wilson Line Ltd.
7 July	Midhurst	Tanker	Blyth Dry Docks & Shipbuilding Co. Ltd	Blyth, Northumberland	United Kingdom	For Stephenson Clarke Ltd.
9 July	Thresher	Thresher-class submarine	Portsmouth Naval Shipyard	Kittery, Maine	United States	
11 July	Gurkha	Tribal-class frigate	John I. Thornycroft & Company	Southampton	United Kingdom	
20 July	Knightsgarth	Bulk carrier	Blyth Dry Docks & Shipbuilding Co. Ltd	Blyth, Northumberland	United Kingdom	For St. DenisShipping Co. Ltd.
23 July	Foch	Clemenceau-class aircraft carrier			France	Second launching
4 August	Hoel	Charles F. Adams-class destroyer	Defoe Shipbuilding Company	Bay City, Michigan	United States	
19 August	Okinawa	Iwo Jima-class amphibious assault ship	Philadelphia Naval Shipyard	Philadelphia, Pennsylvania	United States	
20 August	Schleswig-Holstein	Hamburg-class destroyer	H. C. Stülcken Sohn	Hamburg	West Germany	For German Navy
24 August	Edward Stevinson	Tanker	Harland & Wolff	Belfast	United Kingdom	For Stevinson, Hardy & Co.
6 September	Bamora	Cargo ship	Harland & Wolff	Belfast	United Kingdom	For British India Steam Navigation Company.
6 September	Nubian	Tribal-class frigate	Portsmouth Dockyard	Portsmouth	United Kingdom	
9 September	Sellers	Charles F. Adams-class destroyer	Bath Iron Works	Bath, Maine	United States	
16 September	Amrum	Ferry	Büsumer Schiffswerft W. & E. Sielaff	Büsum	West Germany	For Amrumer Schiffahrts AG.
17 September	Iwo Jima	Iwo Jima-class amphibious assault ship	Puget Sound Naval Shipyard	Bremerton, Washington	United States	
17 September	Alexandra	Watson Lifeboat	William Osborne	Littlehampton	United Kingdom	For Royal National Lifeboat Institution.
19 September	Tartar	Tribal-class frigate	Devonport Dockyard	Devonport	United Kingdom	
20 September	Fernhurst	Tanker	Blyth Dry Docks & Shipbuilding Co. Ltd	Blyth, Northumberland	United Kingdom	For Stephenson Clarke Ltd.
22 September	Loch Eriboll	Fishing trawler	Brooke Marine Ltd.	Lowestoft	United Kingdom	For Loch Fishing Co.
24 September	Enterprise	Unique nuclear-powered aircraft carrier	Newport News Shipbuilding	Newport News, Virginia	United States	
28 September	Amrum	Passenger ship	Büsumer Schiffswerft W. & E. Sielaff	Büsum	West Germany	For Amrumer Schiffahrts-AG. IMO 5015311
4 October	Diane	Daphné-class submarine	Dubigeon	Nantes	France	For French Navy
6 October	Avonbank	Cargo ship	Harland & Wolff	Belfast	United Kingdom	For Bank Line.
8 October	Scamp	Skipjack-class submarine	Mare Island Naval Shipyard	Vallejo, California	United States	
8 October	Constellation	Kitty Hawk-class aircraft carrier	New York Navy Yard	Brooklyn, New York	United States	
21 October	Dreadnought	Unique nuclear-powered submarine	Vickers Armstrong	Barrow-in-Furness	United Kingdom	
31 October	Snook	Skipjack-class submarine	Ingalls Shipbuilding	Pascagoula, Mississippi	United States	
15 November	Triton	Ferry	Brooke Marine Ltd.	Lowestoft	United Kingdom	For private owner.
22 November	Ethan Allen	Ethan Allen-class submarine	Electric Boat	Groton, Connecticut	United States	
23 November	Krossfon	Bulk carrier	Harland & Wolff	Belfast	United Kingdom	For Sigval Bergsen.
14 December	Clyde	Launch	Harland & Wolff	Belfast	United Kingdom	For Clyde Navigation Trust.
20 December	Norsk Drott	Tanker	Harland & Wolff	Belfast	United Kingdom	For Norsk Braendselojle A/S.
21 December	Flore	Daphné-class submarine	Direction des Constructions et Armes Navales	Cherbourg	France	For French Navy
10 December	Barney	Charles F. Adams-class destroyer	New York Shipbuilding	Camden, New Jersey	United States	
12 December	Theron		Gebroeders Pot N. V.	Bolnes	Netherlands	
19 December	Esso Dover	Tanker	J. Bolson & Son Ltd.	Poole	United Kingdom	For Esso Petroleum Co. Ltd.
20 December	Pass of Melfort	Tanker	Blyth Dry Docks & Shipbuilding Co. Ltd	Blyth, Northumberland	United Kingdom	For Bulk Oil Steamship Co. Ltd.
Unknown date	Corona	Tender	Brooke Marine Ltd.	Lowestoft	United Kingdom	For private owner.
Unknown date	O.L.980	Tank barge	J. Bolson & Son Ltd.	Poole	United Kingdom	For Compagnia Shell de Venezuela.
