= HMNZS Taranaki =

Frigate of the Royal New Zealand Navy

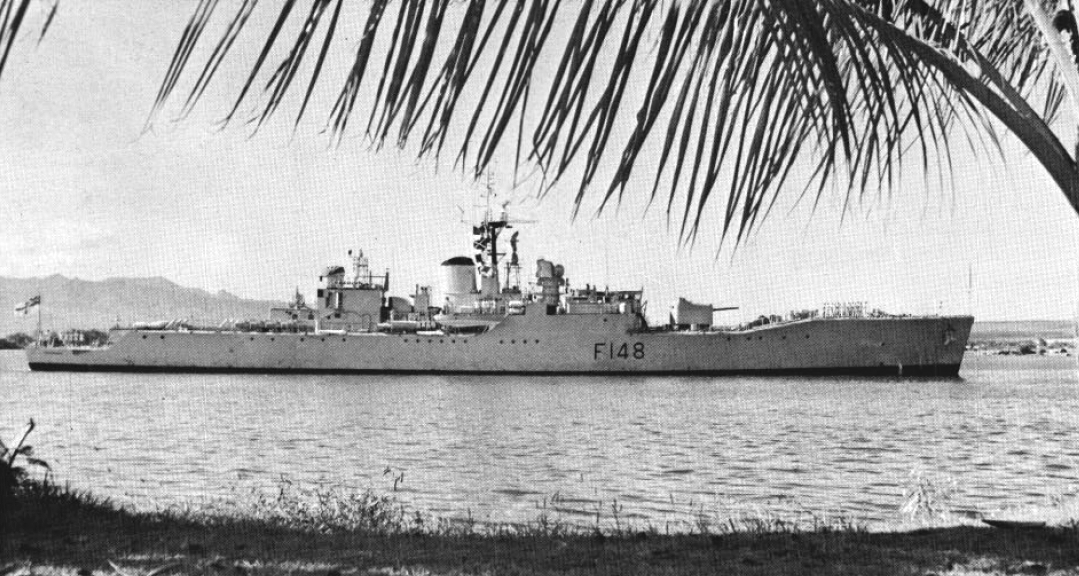
- HMNZS Taranaki at Pearl Harbor c. 1963

History

New Zealand
- Name: Taranaki
- Namesake: Taranaki Province
- Builder: J. Samuel White & Co, Cowes
- Launched: 19 August 1959
- Commissioned: 28 March 1961
- Decommissioned: 18 June 1982
- Stricken: 2 July 1982
- Fate: Sold and broken up 1988

General characteristics
- Class & type: Modified Rothesay-class frigate
- Displacement: 2,144 tonnes
- Length: 112 m (367 ft)
- Beam: 12 m (39 ft)
- Draught: 5 m (16 ft)
- Propulsion: 2-shaft double-reduction geared steam turbines
- Speed: 30 knots (56 km/h)
- Range: 400 tons oil fuel, 5,200 nautical miles (9,630 km) at 12 knots (22 km/h)
- Complement: originally 219, later 240
- Armament: 2 × 4.5 in (114 mm) guns; 1 × 40 mm gun; Sea Cat missiles

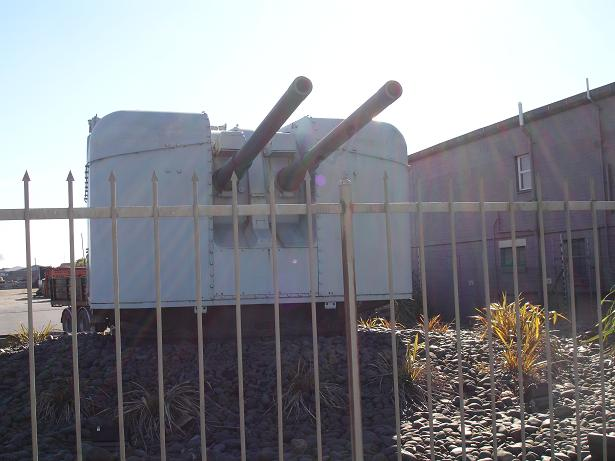
HMNZS Taranaki' 4.5-inch twin gun turret in Penrose Auckland

HMNZS Taranaki (F148) was a Type 12M(Modified), Rothesay-class frigate in service with the Royal New Zealand Navy (RNZN) from 1960 to 1982. Along with her sister ship Otago, the pair of ships formed a core part of the RNZN escort force throughout the 1960s and 1970s. She was named after Taranaki Province.

== Construction and delivery ==
Taranaki's first crew arrived in Cowes on 27 March 1961 after a full military march from Plymouth; the ship commissioned into the RNZN a day later. The new frigate had been fitted out with an impressive amount of fine worked wood panelling in the ward room and other joint facilities. She was formally handed over on 29 March after completing her final sea trials. She was however a dated design, compared to the Tribal-class frigate, HMS Eskimo, being built alongside it with its fast starting gas turbines. and the Tribal-class frigate's pad and hangar for the Westland Wasp helicopters that were being trialled for torpedo attack at maximum sonar range - beyond the Limbo anti-submarine mortars' capabilities.

== Service ==
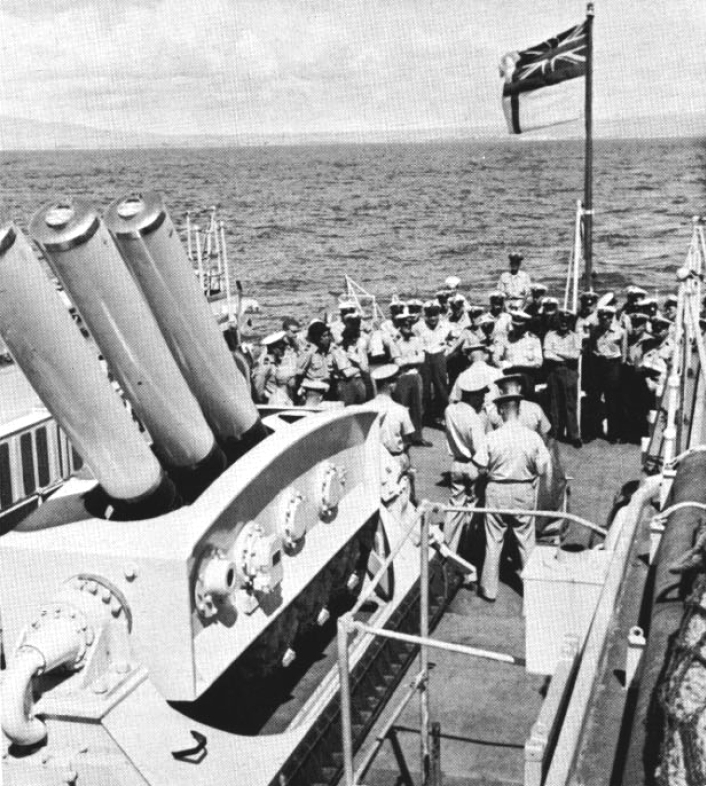
Limbo ASW mortar on HMNZS Taranaki c1963

The first decade of Taranaki's existence saw her take part in regular deployments to the Far East, to Hawaii, Australia and the Pacific for exercises with ships of other navies, and ‘show the flag’ tours.

Between 1974 and 1978, Taranaki was usually laid up due to a shortage of naval personnel. During this period while her hull and propulsion system remained in reasonable order, there was a substantial deterioration in the reliability of her combat systems and they ceased to be entirely viable. On the occasions that she was at sea she was mainly protecting New Zealand's Economic Exclusion Zone (EEZ).

On 23 January 1979, she was fully recommissioned after refitting for a training and fisheries role. The Seacat missile system and heightfinding radar had already been removed and during the next three years, Taranaki experienced considerable problems with her steam turbines, which saw her in the Devonport dockyard for months. Extensive plans were made and approved by the Government for her conversion to gas turbine propulsion, for long ranged resource protection patrols of New Zealand's newly declared 200-mile EEZ, reputed to be the fourth largest in the world. Sensors would have been partly updated for this purpose with new fire control and radar. A helicopter landing pad and hangar would have been incorporated. Originally the Government had approved a new OTO Melara 76 mm gun to be fitted in the reconstruction, but the Navy insisted the 4.5-inch twin gun mount be maintained, but were stuck with the ordered fire control intended to the 76 mm gun.

There were some questions about the gearing and coupling arrangements for the gas turbines, and eventually with rapidly escalating cost estimates of $72 million for the reconstruction in a UK shipyard, the whole project was cancelled in favour of buying second hand RN Leander-class frigates available after the 1981 UK defence cuts. It was perceived they would be cheaper to refit and the deal was sealed when the RNZN was made the exclusive offer of HMS Bacchante, a similar vintage broad beam Leander to HMNZS Canterbury, as well as HMS Dido which was being offered on the world market to any buyer, acceptable to the UK, partly to pay off the $50 million (23m pounds UK) cost of Dido's 1975-78 modernisation which had required an enormous amount of very expensive hull repair work on the then 15-year-old frigate. The cost of its refit was as high as that of the greater scale conversion of later Leanders to Exocet missile and Lynx helicopter operation and appeared to match that of the final new Type 21 frigates. Enormous refit costs were beginning to convince the UK Treasury against modernisation of steam powered Leanders. Many RNZN officers, believed the hull of the Taranaki had been better maintained and would have more viable long term.

== Decommissioning and fate ==
On 14 June 1982, Taranaki set out on her last voyage from New Plymouth (her home port and chief city of her namesake province) to Auckland for decommissioning. During 16–17 June, her ammunition was safely removed and her boiler ceremonially doused out.

Taranaki was officially decommissioned on 18 June 1982. She was sold to Pacific Steel Ltd in August 1987 and her breaking up was completed in March 1988.

== See also ==
- Frigates of the Royal New Zealand Navy
