= Lead ship =

First of a series or class of ships

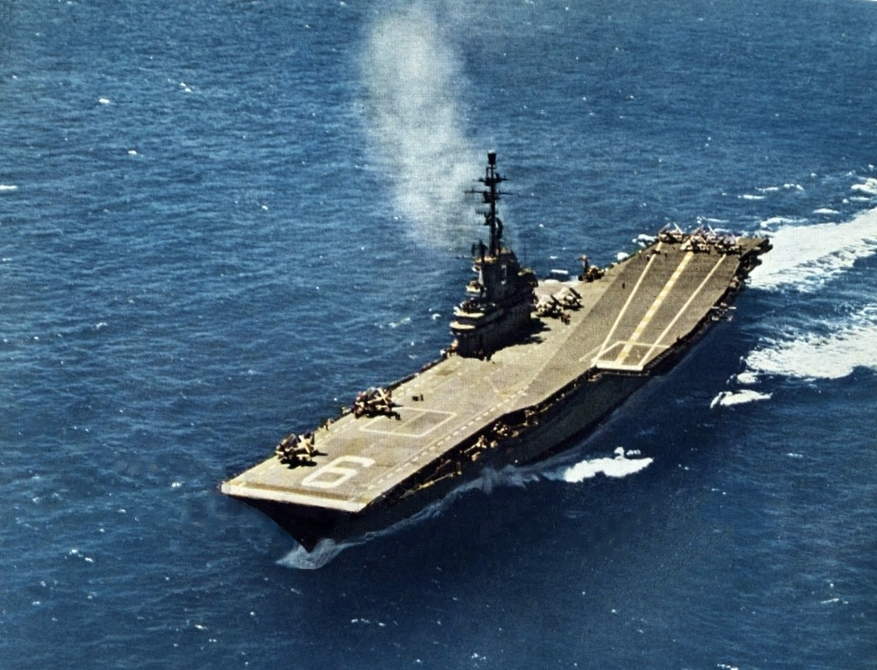
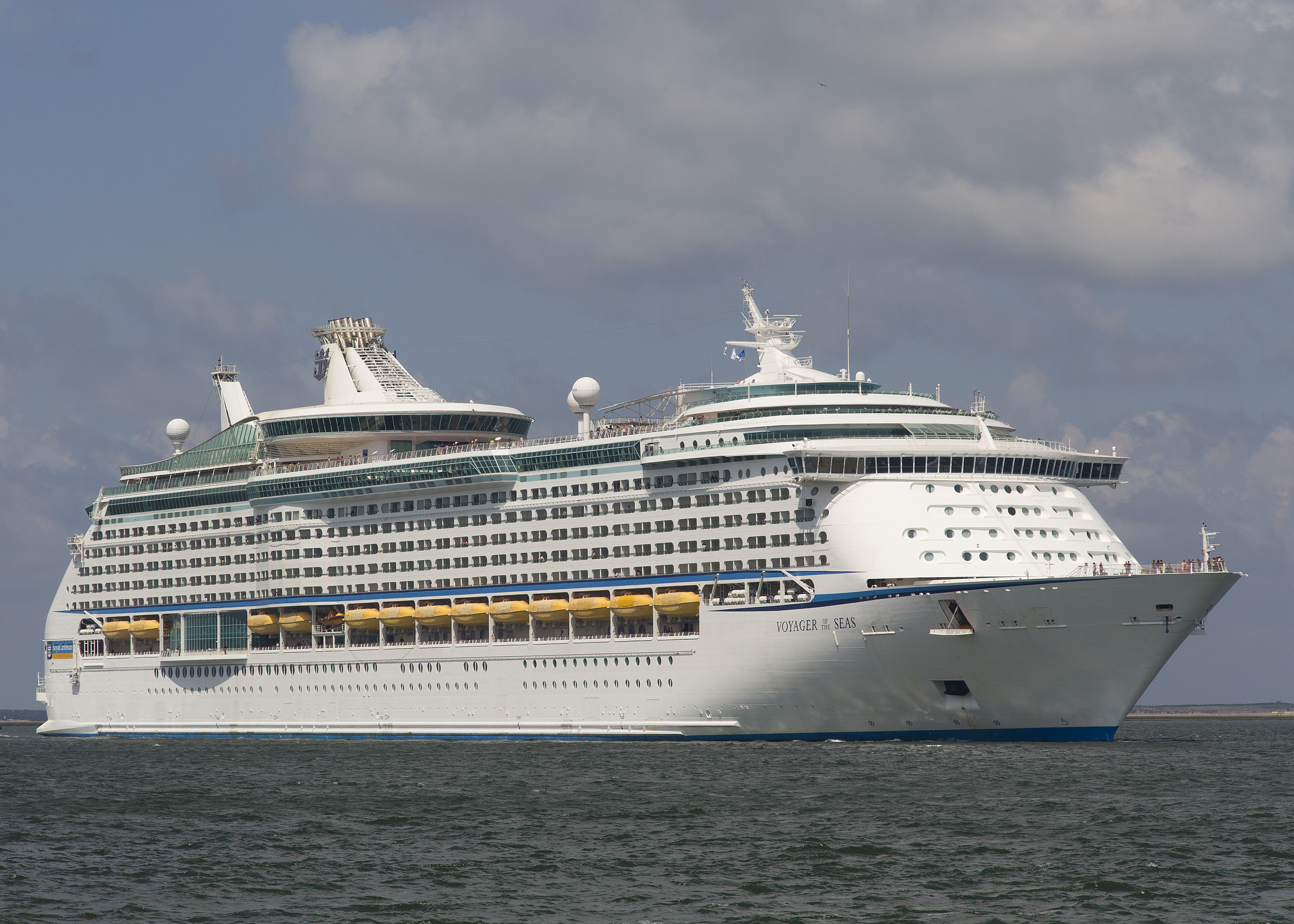
Left: USS Essex, lead of the Essex class
Right: MS Voyager of the Seas, lead ship of the Voyager class

The lead ship, name ship, or class leader is the first of a series or class of ships that are all constructed according to the same general design. The term is applicable to naval ships and large civilian vessels.

Large ships are very complex and may take five to ten years to build. Improvements based on experience with building and operating the lead ship are likely to be incorporated into the design or construction of later ships in the class, so it is rare to have vessels that are identical.

The second and later ships are often started before the first one is completed, launched and tested. Nevertheless, building copies is still more efficient and cost effective than building prototypes, and the lead ship will usually be followed by copies with some improvements rather than radically different versions. The improvements will sometimes be retrofitted to the lead ship. Occasionally, the lead ship will be launched and commissioned for shakedown testing before following ships are completed, making the lead ship a combination of template and prototype, rather than expending resources on a prototype that will never see actual use.

== Naming ==
Ship classes are typically named in one of two ways: echoing the name of the lead ship, such as the Pennsylvania-class battleships, whose lead ship was USS Pennsylvania, and the Olympic class, whose lead ship was RMS Olympic, or defining a theme by which vessels in the class are named, as in the Royal Navy's Tribal-class frigates, named after tribes of the world, such as HMS Mohawk. If a ship class is produced for another navy, the first active unit will become the lead ship for that navy; for example, the Oliver Hazard Perry-class frigates are known as the Adelaide class in Royal Australian Navy service.
