= 1st Frigate Squadron (United Kingdom) =

- Active: November 1972 – December 2001
- Country: United Kingdom
- Branch: Royal Navy
- Size: Squadron

Commanders
- First: Captain Geoffrey C. Lloyd
- Last: Captain Philip A. Jones

The 1st Frigate Squadron was a naval unit of the Royal Navy from 1972 to 2001.

== Operational history ==
During its existence, the squadron included Leander-class and Type 22 frigates. Ships from the squadron participated in the Cod Wars, the Silver Jubilee Fleet Review, the Armilla Patrol and the Falklands War. The squadron was disbanded in 2001.

=== 1977 ===
At the Silver Jubilee Fleet Review, 24–29 June 1977, 1st Frigate Squadron comprised:

- HMS Galatea (F18) – Capt. D. B. Nolan, RN (Captain 1st Frigate Squadron)
- HMS Phoebe (F42) – Capt. H. M. Balfour, RN
- HMS Alacrity (F174) – Cdr. R. B. Mortlock, RN
- HMS Tartar (F133) – Cdr. M. A. C. Moore, RN
- HMS Gurkha (F122) – Cdr. D. H. Barraclough, RN
- HMS Salisbury (F32) – Cdr. J. T. Saunders, RN

== Squadron commander ==
| Commander | Ship | Dates |
|---|---|---|
| Captain Geoffrey C. Lloyd | HMS Charybdis | November 1972-December 1973 |
| Captain John A.F. Lawson | HMS Charybdis | December 1973-April 1975 |
| Captain D. Conrad Jenkin | HMS Galatea | April–October 1975 |
| Captain William S. Gueterbock | HMS Galatea | October 1975-March 1977 |
| Captain David B. Nolan | HMS Galatea | March 1977-August 1978 |
| Captain Anthony R. Barnden | HMS Galatea | August 1978-November 1979 |
| Captain Robin I. T. Hogg | HMS Galatea | November 1979-January 1981 |
| Captain Timothy M. Bevan | HMS Ajax | January–April 1981 |
| Captain Jeremy M. Porter | HMS Ajax | April 1981-May 1983 |
| Captain Peter C. Abbott | HMS Ajax | May 1983-December 1984 |
| Captain John F.S. Trinder | HMS Ajax/HMS Euryalus | December 1984 – 1986 |
| Captain David M. Jeffreys | HMS Euryalus | 1986-June 1987 |
| Captain Geoffrey A. Eades | HMS Beaver | June 1987-March 1988 |
| Captain Andrew B. Gough | HMS Beaver | March–August 1988 |
| Captain Anthony Morton | HMS Beaver | August 1988 – 1990 |
| Captain Roger C. Lane-Nott | HMS Coventry | March 1990 – 1991 |
| Captain Stephen E. Saunders | HMS Coventry | 1991-1993 |
| Captain Christopher D. Stanford | HMS Coventry | 1993-1994 |
| Captain Thomas Morton | HMS Coventry | 1994-1996 |
| Captain David A. Lewis | HMS Boxer | 1996-1997 |
| Captain Richard J. Ibbotson | HMS Beaver/HMS Boxer | 1997-December 1999 |
| Captain Philip A. Jones | HMS Coventry | December 1999 – 2001 |

== See also ==
- List of squadrons and flotillas of the Royal Navy
