= HMS Nubian (F131) =

1962 Type 81 or Tribal-class frigate of the Royal Navy

History

United Kingdom
- Name: HMS Nubian
- Builder: Portsmouth Dockyard
- Laid down: 7 September 1959
- Launched: 6 September 1960
- Commissioned: 9 October 1962
- Identification: Pennant number F131
- Fate: Sunk as target 1987

General characteristics
- Class & type: Tribal-class frigate
- Displacement: 2,300 long tons (2,300 t) standard; 2,700 long tons (2,700 t) full load
- Length: 360 ft 0 in (109.73 m) oa; 350 ft 0 in (106.68 m) pp
- Beam: 42 ft 3 in (12.88 m)
- Draught: 13 ft 3 in (4.04 m); 17 ft 6 in (5.33 m) (propellers)
- Propulsion: Single-shaft COSAG; 1 Steam turbine 12,500 shp (9,300 kW); 1 Metrovick G-6 gas turbine 7,500 shp (5,600 kW)
- Speed: 27 knots (50 km/h; 31 mph) (COSAG)
- Range: 4,500 nautical miles (8,300 km; 5,200 mi) at 12 knots (22 km/h; 14 mph)
- Complement: 253
- Sensors & processing systems: Radar type 965 air-search; Radar type 993 low-angle search; Radar type 978 navigation; Radar type 903 gunnery fire-control; Radar type 262 GWS-21 fire-control; Sonar type 177 search; Sonar type 170 attack; Sonar type 162 bottom profiling; Ashanti and Gurkha; Sonar type 199 variable-depth
- Armament: 2 × single 4.5 inch (114 mm) Mark 5* Mod 1 guns; 2 × single 40 mm Mark 7 Bofors guns, later; 2 × four-rail GWS-20 Sea Cat missile systems; 2 × single 20 mm Oerlikon guns; 1 × Mark 10 Limbo ASW mortar
- Aircraft carried: 1 × Westland Wasp helicopter

Service record
- Operations: Beira Patrol

HMS Nubian was a Tribal-class frigate of the Royal Navy in service from 1962 and 1979. She was named after the Nubian ethnic group, located in Egypt and Sudan. She was sunk as a target in 1987.

Nubian was built by Portsmouth Dockyard, at a cost of £4,360,000. She was launched on 6 September 1960 by Lady Holland-Martin, wife of Vice-Admiral Sir Deric Holland-Martin, and commissioned on 9 October 1962.

== Operational service ==
In 1964, Nubian suffered a collision that caused minor damage. She joined the Beira Patrol off Mozambique in 1967, supporting the enforcement of an oil blockade of Rhodesia. Nubian constituted the escort providing radar coverage for the Daily Mail Trans-Atlantic Air Race in 1969 that commemorated the 50th Anniversary of Alcock and Brown's non-stop transatlantic flight from Newfoundland to Britain. In 1971 she was present at Portsmouth Navy Days. In 1975, Nubian reinforced the British garrison in Belize after Guatemala intensified its threats to annex the territory.

Nubian was present at the 1977 Spithead Fleet Review, held in honour of Queen Elizabeth II's Silver Jubilee. At this time she was part of the 5th Frigate Squadron.

In 1978, Nubian assisted in the cleanup after the supertanker Amoco Cadiz grounded off the coast of Brittany; more than 200,000 tons (180,000 metric tons) of oil had polluted the Brittany coastline.

Nubian entered the reserve in 1979, being placed in the Standby Squadron and put on the disposal list in 1981. While in reserve, Nubian became a training ship and had parts cannibalised for three sister-ships sold to Indonesia in 1984. The frigate was sunk as a target on 27 May 1987.

== Publications ==
- Abnett, Keith (2024). The Fleet Air Arm: The Cinderella Airforce with the RAF as the Ugly Sisters. Austin Macauley Publishers. pp. 76, 78. ISBN 9781398498068 – via Google Books.
- Blackman, Raymond V. B., ed. (1971). Jane's Fighting Ships 1971–72. London: Sampson Low, Marston & Co., Ltd. ISBN 0-354-00096-9.
- Colledge, J. J.; Warlow, Ben (2006) [1969]. Ships of the Royal Navy: The Complete Record of All Fighting Ships of the Royal Navy from the 15th Century to the Present (3rd Rev ed.). London: Chatham Publishing. ISBN 978-1-86176-281-8. OCLC 67375475.
- Gardiner, Robert; Chesneau, Roger, eds. (1995). Conway's All the World's Fighting Ships 1947-1995. London: Conway Maritime Press. ISBN 978-0-8517-7605-7.
- Marriott, Leo (1983). Royal Navy Frigates 1945-1983. Surrey: Ian Allan Ltd.
