= HMS Eskimo (F119) =

1963 Type 81 or Tribal-class frigate of the Royal Navy

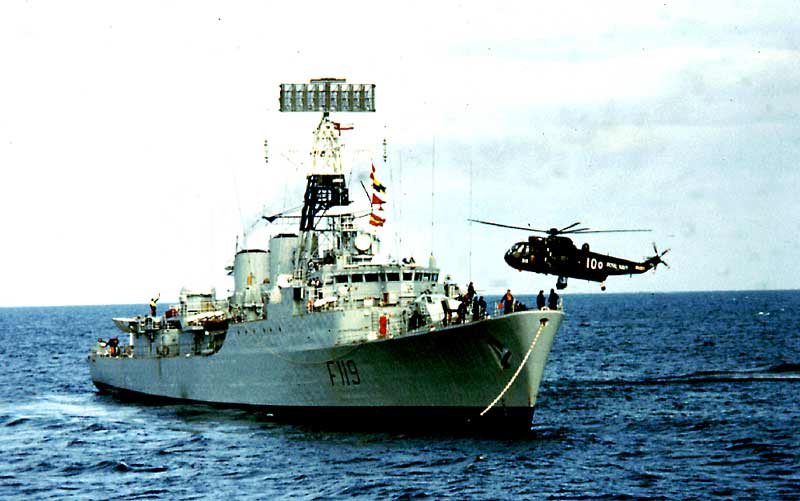
- HMS Eskimo

History

United Kingdom
- Name: HMS Eskimo
- Operator: Royal Navy
- Builder: J. Samuel White
- Laid down: 22 October 1958
- Launched: 20 March 1961
- Commissioned: 21 February 1963
- Decommissioned: August 1980
- Identification: F119
- Motto: Sikumi Ungaskitumi; ("Fire and Ice")
- Fate: Scrapped in 1992

General characteristics
- Class & type: Tribal-class frigate
- Displacement: 2,300 long tons (2,300 t) standard; 2,700 long tons (2,700 t) full load
- Length: 360 ft 0 in (109.73 m) oa; 350 ft 0 in (106.68 m) pp
- Beam: 42 ft 3 in (12.88 m)
- Draught: 13 ft 3 in (4.04 m); 17 ft 6 in (5.33 m) (propellers)
- Propulsion: Single-shaft COSAG; 1 Steam turbine 12,500 shp (9,300 kW); 1 Metrovick G-6 gas turbine 7,500 shp (5,600 kW)
- Speed: 27 knots (50 km/h; 31 mph) (COSAG)
- Range: 4,500 nautical miles (8,300 km; 5,200 mi) at 12 knots (22 km/h; 14 mph)
- Complement: 253
- Sensors & processing systems: Radar type 965 air-search; Radar type 993 low-angle search; Radar type 978 navigation; Radar type 903 gunnery fire-control; Radar type 262 GWS-21 fire-control; Sonar type 177 search; Sonar type 170 attack; Sonar type 162 bottom profiling; Ashanti and Gurkha; Sonar type 199 variable-depth
- Armament: 2 × single 4.5 inch (114 mm) Mark 5* Mod 1 guns; 2 × single 40 mm Mark 7 Bofors guns, later; 2 × four-rail GWS-20 Sea Cat missile systems; 2 × single 20 mm Oerlikon guns; 1 × Mark 10 Limbo ASW mortar
- Aircraft carried: 1 × Westland Wasp helicopter

HMS Eskimo was a Tribal-class frigate of the Royal Navy in service from 1963 to 1980. She was scrapped in 1992.

Eskimo was built by J. Samuel White, of Cowes, at a cost of £4,670,000. The frigate was launched on 20 March 1961 and commissioned on 21 February 1963 with the pennant number F119.

== Service ==
'Eskimo' began her third commission in October 1966. Sailing from Portsmouth in May 1967, she arrived off Port Said on the morning of 5 June, but due to the outbreak of war between Israel and the surrounding Arab states (the six day war), she was unable to transit the Suez Canal as planned. ‘Eskimo’ then spent some three months in the Mediterranean (based primarily in Malta) before eventually sailing to the Middle East via Gibraltar, Simonstown (South Africa), two Beira patrols, and Mombasa, arriving on station in Bahrain in December of that year. She subsequently replaced her sister ship Ashanti off Aden in 1968 in support of the withdrawal of British troops from that colony. ‘Eskimo’ finally returned to the UK in May 1968 having spent a full twelve months away from home. Later in the year she took part in Portsmouth 'Navy Days'. Between 1966 and 1967 she was commanded by Simon Cassels.

During 1974 and 1975 she was commanded by Alan Grose.

Due to a manpower shortage in the Royal Navy, Eskimo was reduced to the reserve in 1980, being placed into the Standby Squadron, and in 1981 was put on the disposal list. In 1984 she was cannibalised for spare parts for three Tribal-class frigates sold to Indonesia. On 16 January 1986, Eskimo was towed from Portsmouth to Pembroke Dock to be used as a target, but was not used as such. In May 1992 she was towed from Pembroke to Bilbao, Spain to be scrapped.

== Publications ==
- Blackman, Raymond V.B. Jane's Fighting Ships 1971–72. London: Sampson Low, Marston & Co, 1971. ISBN 0 354 00096 9.
- Colledge, J. J.; Warlow, Ben (2006) [1969]. Ships of the Royal Navy: The Complete Record of All Fighting Ships of the Royal Navy from the 15th Century to the Present (3rd Rev ed.). London: Chatham Publishing. ISBN 978-1-86176-281-8. OCLC 67375475.
- Gardiner, Robert & Chesneau, Roger (1995), Conway's All the World's Fighting Ships 1947-1995, Conway Maritime Press, London, ISBN 978-0-8517-7605-7.
- Marriott, Leo, 1983. Royal Navy Frigates 1945-1983, Ian Allan Ltd. ISBN 07110 1322 5
