= HMS Mohawk (F125) =

1963 Type 81 or Tribal-class frigate of the Royal Navy

- HMS Mohawk

History

United Kingdom
- Name: HMS Mohawk
- Builder: Vickers
- Laid down: 23 December 1960
- Launched: 5 April 1962
- Commissioned: 29 November 1963
- Decommissioned: 1980
- Identification: Pennant number F125
- Fate: Sold for scrap

General characteristics
- Class & type: Tribal-class frigate
- Displacement: 2,300 long tons (2,300 t) standard; 2,700 long tons (2,700 t) full load
- Length: 360 ft 0 in (109.73 m) oa; 350 ft 0 in (106.68 m) pp
- Beam: 42 ft 3 in (12.88 m)
- Draught: 13 ft 3 in (4.04 m); 17 ft 6 in (5.33 m) (propellers)
- Propulsion: Single-shaft COSAG; 1 Steam turbine 12,500 shp (9,300 kW); 1 Metrovick G-6 gas turbine 7,500 shp (5,600 kW)
- Speed: 27 knots (50 km/h; 31 mph) (COSAG)
- Range: 4,500 nautical miles (8,300 km; 5,200 mi) at 12 knots (22 km/h; 14 mph)
- Complement: 253
- Sensors & processing systems: Radar type 965 air-search; Radar type 993 low-angle search; Radar type 978 navigation; Radar type 903 gunnery fire-control; Radar type 262 GWS-21 fire-control; Sonar type 177 search; Sonar type 170 attack; Sonar type 162 bottom profiling; Ashanti and Gurkha; Sonar type 199 variable-depth
- Armament: 2 × single 4.5 inch (114 mm) Mark 5* Mod 1 guns; 2 × single 40 mm Mark 7 Bofors guns, later; 2 × four-rail GWS-20 Sea Cat missile systems; 2 × single 20 mm Oerlikon guns; 1 × Mark 10 Limbo ASW mortar
- Aircraft carried: 1 × Westland Wasp helicopter

Service record
- Part of: Naval On-call Force of the Mediterranean (1977)
- Operations: Beira Patrol (1973)

HMS Mohawk was a Tribal-class frigate of the Royal Navy in service from 1963. She was named after a tribe of Native Americans located in southeast Canada and New York State. Mohawk was scrapped in 1983.

== Design and construction ==
The Tribal-, or Type 81-class, frigates were developed in the mid-1950s as a General Purpose frigate, capable of use in both anti-submarine and anti-aircraft duties in a full-scale war, while serving for Cold War policing duties in peace-time, in particular to replace the old Loch-class frigates serving in the Persian Gulf.

The Tribals were 360 ft 0 in (109.73 m) long overall and 350 ft 0 in (106.68 m) between perpendiculars, with a beam of 42 ft 3 in (12.88 m). The ship's hull had a draught of 13 ft 5 1/2 in (4.10 m), with the propeller increasing overall draught to 17 ft 6 in (5.33 m). Displacement was 2,300 long tons (2,300 t) standard and 2,500 long tons (2,500 t) full load. Propulsion was by a single-shaft Combined steam and gas (COSAG) arrangement, effectively half of the powerplant of the County-class destroyers. A single Babcock & Wilcox boiler fed steam at 550 psi (3,800 kPa) and 850 °F (454 °C; 728 K) to a geared steam turbine rated at 12,500 shp (9,300 kW), which could be supplemented by a Metrovick G-6 gas turbine rated at 7,500 shp (5,600 kW) to reach top speed, with the gas turbine also allowing the ship to get underway quickly in an emergency, without having to wait to raise steam. Speed was about 27–28 kn (31–32 mph; 50–52 km/h) using both steam and gas turbine power, and 21 kn (24 mph; 39 km/h) on steam power alone.

The ships were fitted with two QF 4.5-in (113 mm) Mark 5 guns, salvaged from scrapped Second World War destroyers, mounted fore and aft. It was intended to fit two Seacat anti-aircraft missile launchers, but these were not ready in time, and Gurkha completed with two 40 mm Bofors guns instead, with Seacat replacing the Bofors guns on refit. For anti-submarine and anti-ship duties, a hangar and flight deck for a single Westland Wasp helicopter was fitted, while a Limbo anti-submarine mortar provided close-in anti-submarine armament. Mohawk was fitted with a large Type 965 long range air search radar on a lattice foremast, with a Type 993 short range air/surface target indicating radar and Type 978 navigation radar also fitted. An MRS3 fire control system was carried to direct the 4.5-inch guns. The ship had a sonar suite of Type 177 medium range search sonar, Type 162 bottom search and Type 170 attack sonar. The ship had a crew of 253 officers and other ranks.

Mohawk was built by Vickers, of Barrow-in-Furness, at a cost of £4,705,000. She was laid down on 23 December 1960, was launched on 5 April 1962 and commissioned on 29 November 1963. Her construction had been disrupted by a labour dispute.

== Operational Service ==
In 1965, Mohawk deployed to the Persian Gulf. She joined the Beira Patrol, intended to enforce an oil blockade of Rhodesia, in 1966. The following year, Mohawk deployed to the West Indies and the Mediterranean, becoming the Gibraltar guardship in 1968. By 1969, Mohawk had returned to the West Indies.

Mohawk underwent a conversion to accommodate her planned utilisation as a training ship. The refit entailed the removal of Mohawk's aft 4.5-inch gun and the conversion of her hangar to a classroom, but the process was abandoned. In 1973, Mohawk and the destroyer Antrim relieved the destroyer Devonshire and frigate Lincoln in the Far East Squadron. Mohawk contributed to the Beira Patrol before returning to Britain in 1973. Later that year she embarked on a tour of the Norwegian coast. She was called onto assist in the search for Gaul, a fishing vessel that went missing in the Barents Sea.

In 1974, Mohawk served in the West Indies and the Mediterranean. In 1977, Mohawk joined Naval On-call Force of the Mediterranean (NAVOCFORMED), a NATO multi-national squadron. Later that year, Mohawk formed part of a task force designated "Group 6", led by the cruiser Tiger, that toured the Middle and Far East. During the group's return journey the following year, Mohawk suffered hull damage in the port of Valletta, Malta after slipping her moorings early.

In 1979, Mohawk was reduced to the reserve and allocated to the Standby Squadron. After being placed on the disposal list in 1981. Mohawk was sold for scrap and broken up at Cairnryan.

== Publications ==
- Blackman, Raymond V. B., ed. (1971). Jane's Fighting Ships 1971–72. London: Sampson Low, Marston & Co., Ltd. ISBN 0-354-00096-9.
- Colledge, J. J.; Warlow, Ben (2006) [1969]. Ships of the Royal Navy: The Complete Record of All Fighting Ships of the Royal Navy from the 15th Century to the Present (3rd Rev ed.). London: Chatham Publishing. ISBN 978-1-86176-281-8. OCLC 67375475.
- Critchley, Mike (1992). British Warships Since 1945: Part 5: Frigates. Liskeard, UK: Maritime Press. ISBN 0-907771-13-0.
- Friedman, Norman (2008). British Destroyers & Frigates: The Second World War and After. Barnsley, UK: Seaforth Publishing. ISBN 978-1-84832-015-4.
- Gardiner, Robert; Chumbley, Stephen, eds. (1995). Conway's All The World's Fighting Ships 1947–1995. Annapolis, Maryland, USA: Naval Institute Press. ISBN 1-55750-132-7.
- Marriott, Leo (1983). Royal Navy Frigates 1945-1983. Shepperton, Surrey, UK: Ian Allan. ISBN 0-7110-1322-5.
