= HMS Ashanti (F117) =

1961 Type 81 or Tribal-class frigate of the Royal Navy

- HMS Ashanti

History

United Kingdom
- Name: HMS Ashanti
- Builder: Yarrow Shipbuilders
- Laid down: 15 January 1958
- Launched: 9 March 1959
- Commissioned: 23 November 1961
- Reclassified: Harbour Training Ship 1981
- Home port: Devonport
- Identification: Pennant number F117
- Motto: Kum apim, apim beba':'Kill a thousand, a thousand will come
- Fate: Sunk as target 1988
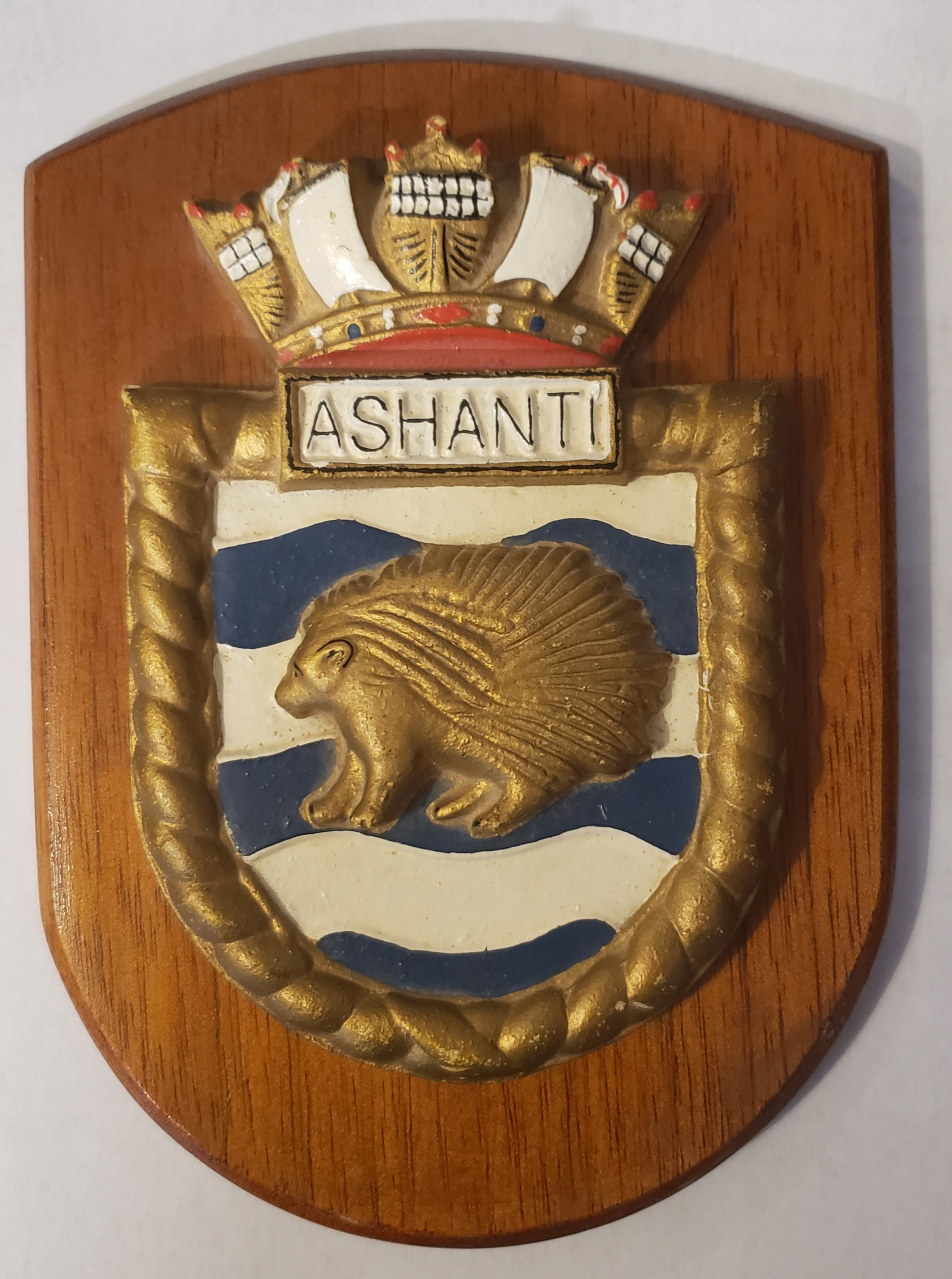
- Badge: On a Field barry wavy of six Blue and White a porcupine Gold. Plaque from the Ship HMS Ashanti Badge F117

General characteristics
- Class & type: Tribal-class frigate
- Displacement: 2,300 long tons (2,300 t) standard; 2,700 long tons (2,700 t) full load
- Length: 360 ft 0 in (109.73 m) oa; 350 ft 0 in (106.68 m) pp
- Beam: 42 ft 3 in (12.88 m)
- Draught: 13 ft 3 in (4.04 m); 17 ft 6 in (5.33 m) (propellers)
- Propulsion: Single-shaft COSAG; 1 Steam turbine 12,500 shp (9,300 kW); 1 Metrovick G-6 gas turbine 7,500 shp (5,600 kW)
- Speed: 27 knots (50 km/h; 31 mph) (COSAG)
- Range: 4,500 nautical miles (8,300 km; 5,200 mi) at 12 knots (22 km/h; 14 mph)
- Complement: 253
- Sensors & processing systems: Radar type 965 air-search; Radar type 993 low-angle search; Radar type 978 navigation; Radar type 903 gunnery fire-control; Radar type 262 GWS-21 fire-control; Sonar type 177 search; Sonar type 170 attack; Sonar type 162 bottom profiling; Ashanti and Gurkha; Sonar type 199 variable-depth
- Armament: 2 × single 4.5 inch (114 mm) Mark 5* Mod 1 guns; 2 × single 40 mm Mark 7 Bofors guns, later; 2 × four-rail GWS-20 Sea Cat missile systems; 2 × single 20 mm Oerlikon guns; 1 × Mark 10 Limbo ASW mortar
- Aircraft carried: 1 × Westland Wasp helicopter

Service record
- Operations: Aden Emergency; Beira Patrol
- Awards: 1967: General Service Medal, South Arabian Clasp

HMS Ashanti was a Tribal-class frigate of the Royal Navy. She was named after the Ashanti people, an ethnic group located in Ghana. The frigate was sunk as a target in 1988.

Ashanti was built by Yarrow, of Scotstoun, at a cost of £5,315,000 and was the first commissioned Royal Navy warship to be equipped with combined steam and gas (COSAG) engines. She was launched on 9 March 1959 and commissioned on 23 November 1961.

== Operational Service ==
In 1962 malicious damage was reported aboard Ashanti.

Ashanti deployed to the Caribbean for trials in 1962. There, in early October, the ship suffered a failure in her COSAG engines, forcing the frigate's return to Britain. Subsequent tests discovered that the COSAG's machinery was defective, which caused blade fracturing in the gas turbine. Hull strengthening also found to be required

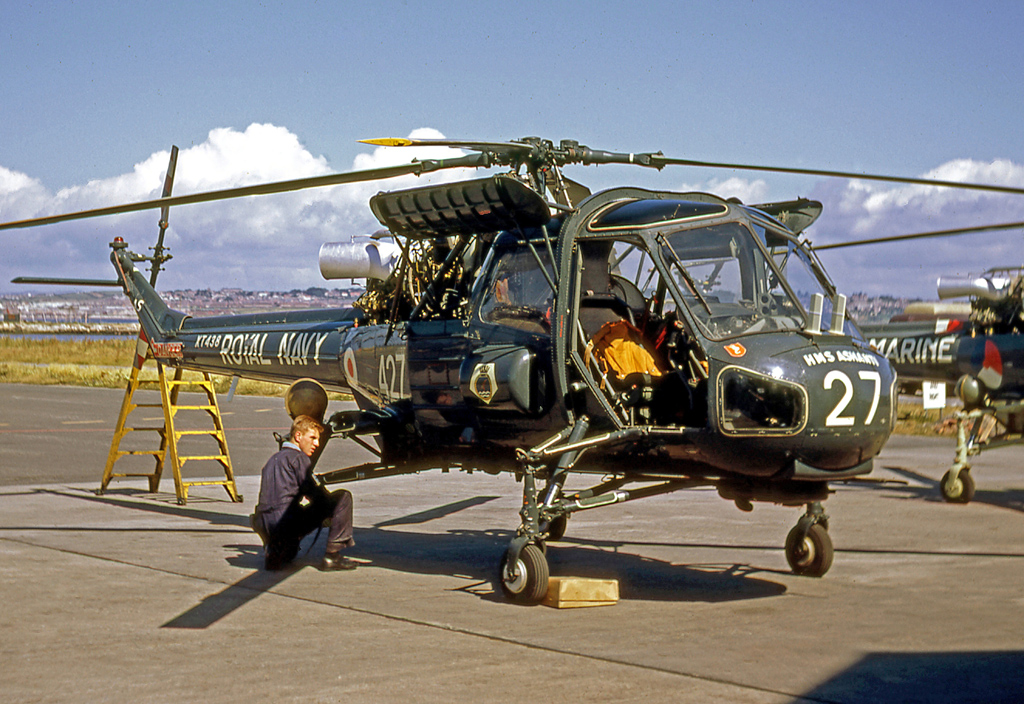
Westland Wasp HAS.1 helicopter of 829 Naval Air Squadron in 1967.

Ashanti was also used to trial the Westland Wasp helicopter, prior to its introduction to active service in 1964. The frigate conducted operations in the Persian Gulf and Arabian Sea for 10 months in 1963. In May 1965, Ashanti suffered minor damage in a collision with the Russian cargo ship Farab in the port of Mombassa, Kenya.

In 1966/67 Ashanti was deployed on the Beira Patrol. During that time she also spent two months in Aden having a gas turbine refit whilst some of the crew were detached to the army as Britain withdrew from Aden, for which the crew were awarded the General Service medal with South Arabia clasp. There was also a visit to the Kuria Muria Islands, before going on to Bahrain and Kuwait. Given the Six-Day War, the Suez Canal being blocked, indecisiveness about whether to clear mines from the Gulf of Aqaba Ashanti headed home via the Cape of Good Hope, stopping off at Simon's Town. Paragraph by onboard rating REM Bryant.

Copied by REM Bryant from

HMS Ashanti Alongside Steamer Point harbour late August/early September 1966. Under repair Steamer Point all of Jan/Feb 1967 and many parties of the ship's company detached to military units during this time, specifically 3rd Bn The Anglian Regiment at Radfan Camp and the 1st Bn The Royal Northumberland Fusiliers in the Crater district. All ships company awarded GSM 1962 with clasp South Arabia. Ship departed to Persian Gulf late Feb/early March 1967 returning to Aden for the last time in early June 1967 at outset of Middle East War.

In 1969 Ashanti embarked a Royal Marines Commando detachment at Bermuda during a Black Power Conference.

In 1970, Ashanti deployed on Beira Patrol, which was designed to prevent oil reaching landlocked Rhodesia via the Portuguese colony of Mozambique. The following year Ashanti was present at the Royal Navy's withdrawal from Malta. In 1974, while returning to Britain from the Caribbean, Ashanti suffered two fatalities when a large wave struck the frigate. The ship was just four hours out of Bermuda on her way back to the UK when hit by the wave. One was lost at sea, while the other suffered injuries and died aboard the frigate. The ship returned to Bermuda to disembark the body, and for repairs to the upper deck structure. Premature reports by Bermudian radio stations sent invalid signals to UK and it was reported on national TV news channels that Ashanti had been sunk and lost at sea.

Three sailors, Timothy J Burton, David Little and James Wardle, died in 1977 from carbon monoxide poisoning after a fire broke out in a boiler room.

Ashanti was returned to service in 1978 following a repair and refit, and finally placed in reserve and became a Harbour Training Ship. She was sunk as a target in 1988 by the submarines Sceptre and Spartan.

The submarine HMS Swiftsure was submerged and launched two Sub Harpoon missiles from distance, video footage was taken from a helicopter observing the exercise. Another 'S' Class boat situated between HMS Swiftsure and the target hit the ship with Mk24 torpedoes subsequent to the Sub Harpoons, which broke the back of the ship causing it to break in two and sink.

== Publications ==
- Blackman, Raymond V. B., ed. (1971). Jane's Fighting Ships 1971–72. London: Sampson Low, Marston & Co., Ltd. ISBN 0-354-00096-9.
- Colledge, J. J.; Warlow, Ben (2006) [1969]. Ships of the Royal Navy: The Complete Record of All Fighting Ships of the Royal Navy from the 15th Century to the Present (3rd Rev ed.). London: Chatham Publishing. ISBN 978-1-86176-281-8. OCLC 67375475.
- Gardiner, Robert; Chesneau, Roger, eds. (1995). Conway's All the World's Fighting Ships 1947-1995. London: Conway Maritime Press. ISBN 978-0-8517-7605-7.
- Marriott, Leo (1983). Royal Navy Frigates 1945-1983. Ian Allan Ltd. ISBN 07110-1322-5.
