= Almirante-class destroyer =

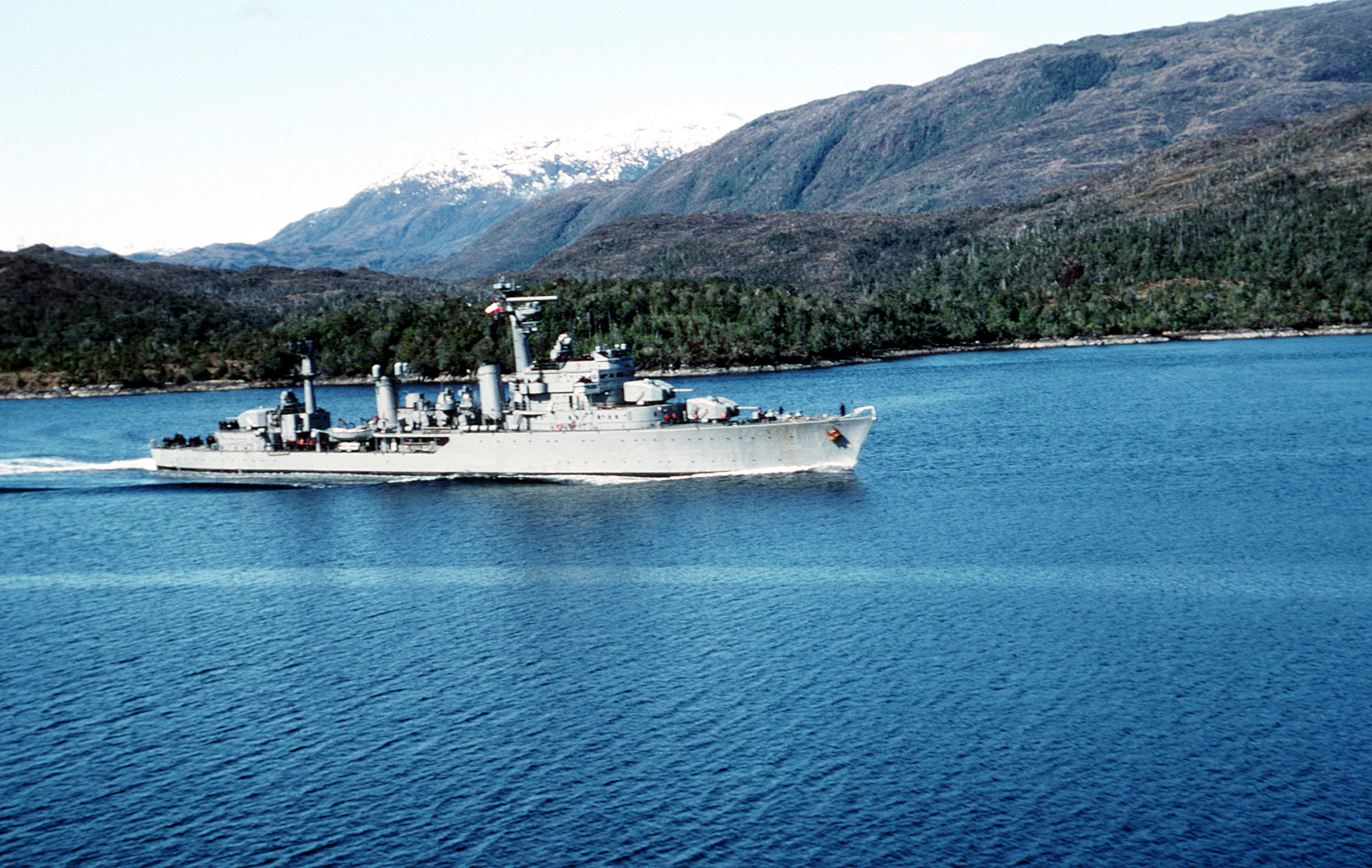
- The destroyer Almirante Williams underway in the Strait of Magellan during UNITAS XXXII

Class overview
- Builders: Vickers-Armstrongs, Barrow-in-Furness
- Operators: Chilean Navy
- In commission: 1960–1996
- Planned: 2
- Completed: 2
- Retired: 2

General characteristics
- Type: Destroyer
- Displacement: 2,730 long tons (2,774 t) standard; 3,300 long tons (3,353 t) full load
- Length: 122.5 m (401 ft 11 in)
- Beam: 13.1 m (43 ft 0 in)
- Draught: 4 m (13 ft 1 in)
- Propulsion: 2 × Babcock & Wilcox boilers; Parsons geared turbines; 2 shafts; 54,000 hp (40,268 kW)
- Speed: 34.5 knots (63.9 km/h; 39.7 mph)
- Range: 6,000 nmi (11,000 km) at 16 kn (30 km/h)
- Complement: 266 (17 officers)
- Armament: 4 single × 4 in (102 mm) Vickers Mark Q guns (4 × 1); 5 × Bofors 40mm/70 (two were replaced by Seacat SAM launchers in 1964); 5 × 21 in (533 mm) torpedo tubes (replaced by 4 × Exocet missiles in 1975); 2 × Squid ASW mortars; 6 × 324 mm (13 in) anti-submarine torpedo tubes (fitted in 1975)

The Almirante class were two destroyers built for the Chilean Navy by Vickers in Barrow in Furness, UK, in 1960, named after Chilean admirals. Their weapons and Marconi sensors were in advance of the RN Daring class, but their internal layout resembled that of the Battle class. They served until the late 1990s. They were fitted with a unique Vickers-designed 4-inch dual purpose naval gun, which fired up to 50 rounds per minute. The gun was in advance of the standard RN 4.5-inch guns, more automated and reliable than the Tiger-class 3 and 6-inch mounts, but not water-cooled. It was rejected for RN use because of doubt about its sustained firing, the large stocks of surplus WW2 single 4.5 and twin 4-inch guns which the RN claimed wrongly were close to the new 4-inch N(R) in performance, and mainly because it was a private out-of-house, Vickers design. The ships were modernised in Britain in 1975, and decommissioned in the late 1990s.

== Programme ==
Chile decided to upgrade its destroyer fleet in the early 1950s and turned to British yards to fulfil the order. Bids were received from Vickers and Thornycroft; the Vickers design was chosen. The order was announced in January 1954 and finalised in 1955. The sensors were a mixture of British- and Netherlands-made radars.

Chile had considered buying a second pair of destroyers in the mid-1960s but instead purchased two Condell-class frigates, a derivative of the Leander class, instead.

== Ships ==
Pennant	Name	Named after	Commissioned	Decommissioned
DDG-18	Almirante Riveros	Galvarino Riveros Cárdenas	1962	1995
DDG-19	Almirante Williams	Juan Williams Rebolledo	1960	1996

Vickers offered two similar ships to the Colombian Navy but the Colombians bought two Halland-class destroyers from Sweden instead.

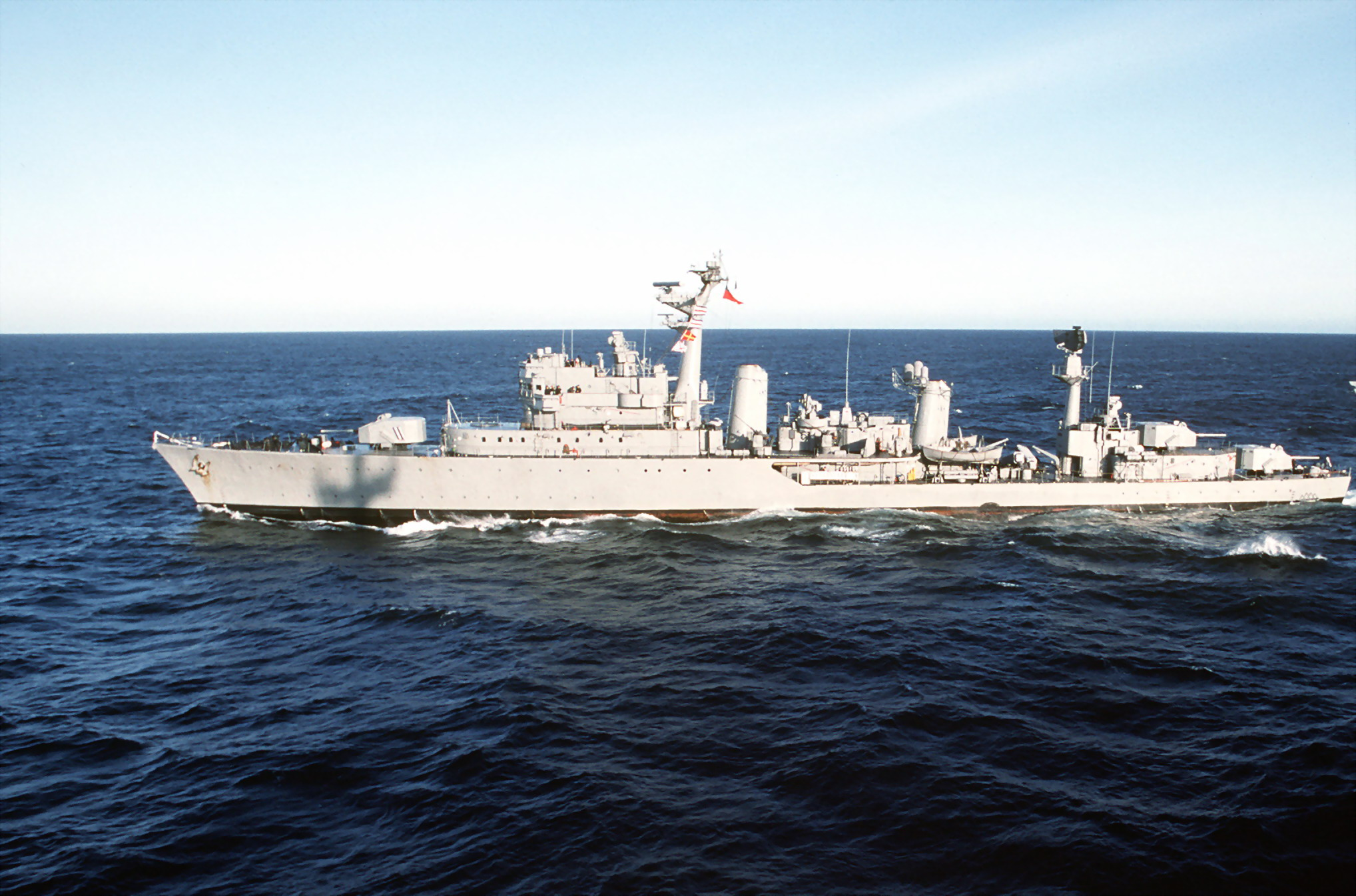
The destroyer Almirante Riveros sails off the coast of Chile during the multinational naval exercise UNITAS XXXII

== Bibliography ==
- Friedman, Norman (2006). British Destroyers & Frigates. Seaforth. ISBN 978-1-84832-015-4.
- Gardiner, Robert; Chumbley, Stephen & Budzbon, Przemysław, eds. (1995). Conway's All the World's Fighting Ships 1947–1995. Annapolis, Maryland: Naval Institute Press. ISBN 1-55750-132-7.
- Wise, Jon (2013). "Securing the ripest plum. Britain and the South American naval export market 1945-75". In Jordan, John (ed.). Warship 2013. London: Conway. pp. 119–466. ISBN 978-1-84486-205-4.
- Marland, Peter (2013). "The Vickers 4-inch MK N(R) Mounting". In Jordan, John (ed.). Warship 2013. London: Conway. pp. 174–177. ISBN 978-1-84486-205-4.
