= Cameron Rusby =

Vice-Admiral Sir Cameron Rusby KCB LVO
- Born: 20 February 1926; Valletta, Malta
- Died: 6 September 2013 (aged 87); Melrose, Scottish Borders
- Military career
- Allegiance: United Kingdom
- Branch: Royal Navy
- Service years: 1945 - 1982
- Rank: Vice-Admiral
- Commands: HMS Ulster; HMS Tartar; Senior Naval Officer West Indies; Flag Officer Scotland and Northern Ireland
- Conflicts: World War II
- Awards: Knight Commander of the Order of the Bath; Lieutenant of the Royal Victorian Order

Vice-Admiral Sir Cameron Rusby KCB LVO (20 February 1926 – 6 September 2013) was a Royal Navy officer who served as Deputy Supreme Allied Commander Atlantic.

== Naval career ==
Educated at the Royal Naval College, Dartmouth, Rusby joined the Royal Navy in February 1945. He served in the closing stages of World War II before being given command of the frigate HMS Ulster in 1958. He became Executive Officer on HMY Britannia in 1962, Deputy Director of Naval Signals in 1965 and Commanding Officer of the frigate HMS Tartar in 1969. He went on to be Deputy Assistant Chief of Staff (Plans and Policy) to the Supreme Allied Commander-in-Chief Southern Europe in 1969, Senior Naval Officer West Indies in 1972 and Assistant Chief of Defence Staff (Operations) in 1974. His last appointments were as Flag Officer Scotland and Northern Ireland in 1977 and Deputy Supreme Allied Commander Atlantic in 1980 before retiring in 1982. He died on 6 September 2013.

== Family ==
In 1948 he married Marion Bell, with whom he had two daughters.

Military offices
Preceded by Sir Anthony Troup	Flag Officer, Scotland and Northern Ireland; 1977–1980	Succeeded by Sir Thomas Baird
Preceded by Sir David Loram	Deputy Supreme Allied Commander Atlantic; 1980–1982	Succeeded by Sir David Hallifax
