= HMS Gurkha (F122) =

Type 81 or Tribal-class frigate of the Royal Navy and Indonesian Navy

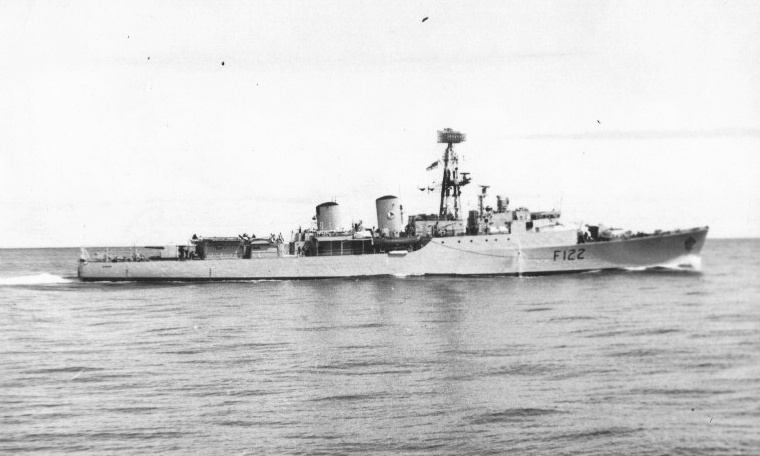
- Gurkha circa. 1964-1966

History

United Kingdom
- Name: HMS Gurkha
- Namesake: Gurkha
- Builder: John I. Thornycroft & Company
- Laid down: 3 November 1958
- Launched: 11 July 1960
- Commissioned: 13 February 1963
- Decommissioned: 30 March 1984
- Identification: Pennant number: F122
- Motto: Ayo Gurkhali; ("The Gurkhas are here!")
- Fate: Sold to Indonesia 1984

Indonesia
- Name: KRI Wilhelmus Zakarias Yohannes
- Namesake: Wilhelmus Zakaria Johannes
- Acquired: 1984
- Commissioned: 21 October 1985
- Stricken: 2000
- Identification: Pennant number: 332
- Fate: Stricken 2000, scrapped

General characteristics
- Class & type: Tribal-class frigate
- Displacement: 2,300 long tons (2,300 t) standard; 2,700 long tons (2,700 t) full load
- Length: 360 ft 0 in (109.73 m) oa; 350 ft 0 in (106.68 m) pp
- Beam: 42 ft 3 in (12.88 m)
- Draught: 13 ft 3 in (4.04 m); 17 ft 6 in (5.33 m) (propellers)
- Propulsion: Single-shaft COSAG; 1 Steam turbine 12,500 shp (9,300 kW); 1 Metrovick G-6 gas turbine 7,500 shp (5,600 kW)
- Speed: 27 knots (50 km/h; 31 mph) (COSAG)
- Range: 4,500 nautical miles (8,300 km; 5,200 mi) at 12 knots (22 km/h; 14 mph)
- Complement: 253
- Sensors & processing systems: Radar type 965 air-search; Radar type 993 low-angle search; Radar type 978 navigation; Radar type 903 gunnery fire-control; Radar type 262 GWS-21 fire-control; Sonar type 177 search; Sonar type 170 attack; Sonar type 162 bottom profiling; Ashanti and Gurkha; Sonar type 199 variable-depth
- Armament: 2 × single 4.5 inch (114 mm) Mark 5* Mod 1 guns; 2 × single 40 mm Mark 7 Bofors guns, later; 2 × four-rail GWS-20 Sea Cat missile systems; 2 × single 20 mm Oerlikon guns; 1 × Mark 10 Limbo ASW mortar
- Aircraft carried: 1 × Westland Wasp helicopter

Service record
- Operations: Third Cod War

HMS Gurkha (F122) was a Tribal-class frigate of the Royal Navy. She was named after an ethnic group located in Nepal, and who continue to serve in the British Army. She was sold to the Indonesian Navy in 1984 and renamed KRI Wilhelmus Zakarias Yohannes (332).

== Design ==
The Tribal-, or Type 81-class, frigates were developed in the mid-1950s as a General Purpose frigate, capable of use in both anti-submarine and anti-aircraft duties in a full-scale war, while serving for Cold War policing duties in peace-time, in particular to replace the old Loch-class frigates serving in the Persian Gulf.

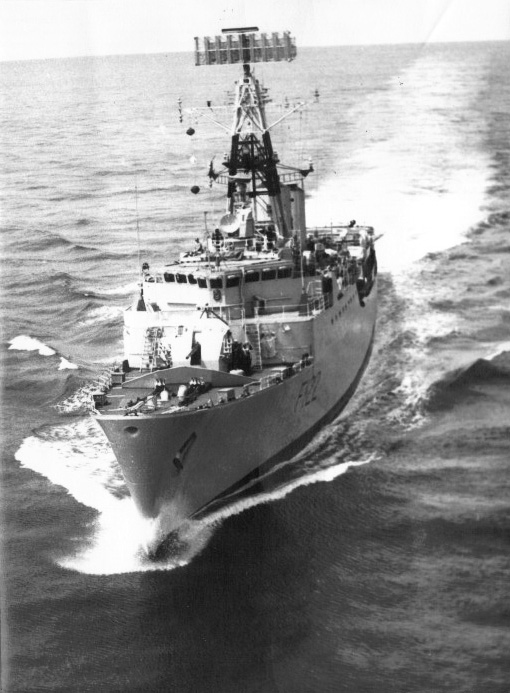

The Tribals were 360 ft 0 in (109.73 m) long overall and 350 ft 0 in (106.68 m) between perpendiculars, with a beam of 42 ft 3 in (12.88 m). The ship's hull had a draught of 13 ft 5 1/2 in (4.10 m), with the propeller increasing overall draught to 17 ft 6 in (5.33 m). Displacement was 2,300 long tons (2,300 t) standard and 2,500 long tons (2,500 t) full load. Propulsion was by a single-shaft Combined steam and gas (COSAG) arrangement, effectively half of the powerplant of the County-class destroyers. A single Babcock & Wilcox boiler fed steam at 550 psi (3,800 kPa) and 850 °F (454 °C; 728 K) to a geared steam turbine rated at 12,500 shp (9,300 kW), which could be supplemented by a Metrovick G-6 gas turbine rated at 7,500 shp (5,600 kW) to reach top speed, with the gas turbine also allowing the ship to get underway quickly in an emergency, without having to wait to raise steam. Speed was about 27–28 kn (31–32 mph; 50–52 km/h) using both steam and gas turbine power, and 21 kn (24 mph; 39 km/h) on steam power alone.

The ships were fitted with two QF 4.5-in (113 mm) Mark 5 guns, salvaged from scrapped Second World War destroyers, mounted fore and aft. It was intended to fit two Seacat anti-aircraft missile launchers, but these were not ready in time, and Gurkha completed with two 40 mm Bofors guns instead, with Seacat replacing the Bofors guns on refit. For anti-submarine and anti-ship duties, a hangar and flight deck for a single Westland Wasp helicopter was fitted, while a Limbo anti-submarine mortar provided close-in anti-submarine armament. Gurkha was fitted with a large Type 965 long range air search radar on a lattice foremast, with a Type 993 short range air/surface target indicating radar and Type 978 navigation radar also fitted. An MRS3 fire control system was carried to direct the 4.5-inch guns. The ship had a sonar suite of Type 177 medium range search sonar, Type 162 bottom search and Type 170 attack sonar. Type 199 Variable Depth Sonar (VDS) was fitted in 1969. The ship had a crew of 253 officers and other ranks.

== Royal Navy service ==
Gurkha was ordered under the 1955–56 Naval Estimates from John I. Thornycroft & Company, of Woolston, Hampshire, at a cost of £4,865,000 She was laid down on 3 November 1958, was launched on 11 July 1960 and commissioned on 13 February 1963, joining the 9th Frigate Squadron in the Middle East. In 1965 she was present at Portsmouth Navy Days, and again deployed to the Middle East with the 9th Frigate Squadron. On 19 June 1966, Gurkha sailed from Aden to the Seychelles to support the Seychelles police as a series of strikes threatened violence. On 14 January 1967 she commenced her third commission, leaving British waters on 24 July. She served on the Beira Patrol and during the withdrawal of British forces from Aden before carrying out patrol operations in the Persian Gulf, returning to Rosyth on 14 May 1968.

In 1975, Gurkha deployed to the West Indies, where the ship performed various duties. In 1976, Gurkha supported Royal Navy efforts against Iceland during the Third Cod War. She sustained superficial damage on 7 May when the patrol ship Óðinn attempted to force the ship towards the British trawler Ross Ramilles, during which Óðinn collided with Gurkha. In that collision Óðinn's port propeller was damaged by Gurkha's starboard stabiliser, forcing her to return to port for repairs.

Gurkha was present at the 1977 Spithead Fleet Review, held in honour of Queen Elizabeth II's Silver Jubilee. At this time she was part of the 1st Frigate Squadron.

Gurkha was reduced to the reserve in 1980, being placed in the Standby Squadron. Although she had been put on the disposal list, Gurkha was removed from the reserve during the Falklands War and prepared for active service, recommissioning on 24 July. Gurkha remained in home waters, fulfilling duties in the absence of ships that were operating in the South Atlantic.

In October 1982, Gurkha became Gibraltar Guardship, following this was a deployment to the Caribbean late in 1982 on "Carib Train" returning to the UK in early 1983. During this later part of her life she had a section of Gurkhas onboard instead of the usual Royal Marine contingent.

== Indonesian Navy service ==
After being decommissioned in March 1984, Gurkha was sold to Indonesia in April that year, and after a refit at Vosper Thornycroft's Woolston, Southampton shipyard, the ship was commissioned into the Indonesian Navy on 21 October 1985. She was renamed KRI Wilhelmus Zakarias Yohannes for the Indonesian national hero Wilhelmus Zakaria Johannes, a radiologist and specialist in X-ray technology. The frigate was stricken from service in 2000.

== Publications ==
- Blackman, Raymond V. B., ed. (1971). Jane's Fighting Ships 1971–72. London: Sampson Low, Marston & Co., Ltd. ISBN 0-354-00096-9.
- Colledge, J. J.; Warlow, Ben (2006) [1969]. Ships of the Royal Navy: The Complete Record of All Fighting Ships of the Royal Navy from the 15th Century to the Present (3rd Rev ed.). London: Chatham Publishing. ISBN 978-1-86176-281-8. OCLC 67375475.
- Critchley, Mike (1992). British Warships Since 1945: Part 5: Frigates. Liskeard, UK: Maritime Press. ISBN 0-907771-13-0.
- Friedman, Norman (2008). British Destroyers & Frigates: The Second World War and After. Barnsley, UK: Seaforth Publishing. ISBN 978-1-84832-015-4.
- Gardiner, Robert; Chumbley, Stephen, eds. (1995). Conway's All The World's Fighting Ships 1947–1995. Annapolis, Maryland, USA: Naval Institute Press. ISBN 1-55750-132-7.
- Marriott, Leo (1983). Royal Navy Frigates 1945-1983. Shepperton, Surrey, UK: Ian Allan. ISBN 0-7110-1322-5.
- Prézelin, Bernard; Baker, A. D. III, eds. (1990). The Naval Institute Guide to Combat Fleets of the World 1990/1991. Annapolis, Maryland, USA: Naval Institute Press. ISBN 0-87021-250-8.
- Wertheim, Eric (2005). Combat Fleets of the World 2005–2006: Their Ships, Aircraft, and Systems. Annapolis, Maryland, US: Naval Institute Press. ISBN 1-59114-934-7.
