= HMS Tartar (F133) =

Type 81 or Tribal-class frigate of the Royal Navy and Indonesian Navy

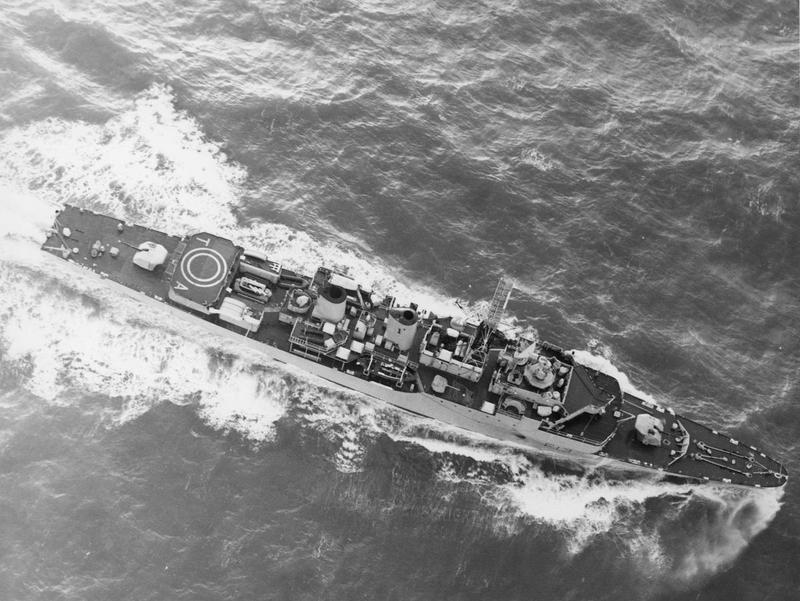
- Aerial view of HMS Tartar in 1971

History

United Kingdom
- Name: HMS Tartar
- Namesake: Tatars
- Builder: Devonport Dockyard
- Laid down: 22 October 1959
- Launched: 19 September 1960
- Commissioned: 26 February 1962
- Decommissioned: 29 March 1984
- Identification: Pennant number: F133
- Motto: Without Fear
- Fate: Sold to Indonesia, 1984

Indonesia
- Name: KRI Hasanuddin
- Namesake: Hasanuddin of Gowa
- Acquired: 1984
- Commissioned: 3 April 1986
- Stricken: 2000
- Identification: Pennant number: 333
- Fate: Stricken 2000, scrapped

General characteristics
- Class & type: Tribal-class frigate
- Displacement: 2,300 long tons (2,300 t) standard; 2,700 long tons (2,700 t) full load
- Length: 360 ft (109.7 m) oa; 350 ft (106.7 m) pp
- Beam: 42 ft 3 in (12.9 m)
- Draught: 13 ft 3 in (4.0 m); 17 ft 6 in (5.3 m) (propellers)
- Propulsion: Single-shaft COSAG; 1 Steam turbine 12,500 shp (9,300 kW); 1 Metrovick G-6 gas turbine 7,500 shp (5,600 kW)
- Speed: 27 knots (50 km/h; 31 mph)
- Range: 4,500 nautical miles (8,300 km; 5,200 mi) at 12 knots (22 km/h; 14 mph)
- Complement: 253
- Sensors & processing systems: Radar type 965 air-search; Radar type 993 low-angle search; Radar type 978 navigation; Radar type 903 gunnery fire-control; Radar type 262 GWS-21 fire-control; Sonar type 177 search; Sonar type 170 attack; Sonar type 162 bottom profiling
- Armament: 2 × single 4.5 inch (114 mm) Mark 5* Mod 1 guns; 2 × single 40 mm Mark 7 Bofors guns, later; 2 × four-rail GWS-20 Sea Cat missile systems; 2 × single 20 mm Oerlikon guns; 1 × Mark 10 Limbo ASW mortar
- Aircraft carried: 1 × Westland Wasp helicopter

Service record
- Operations: Third Cod War

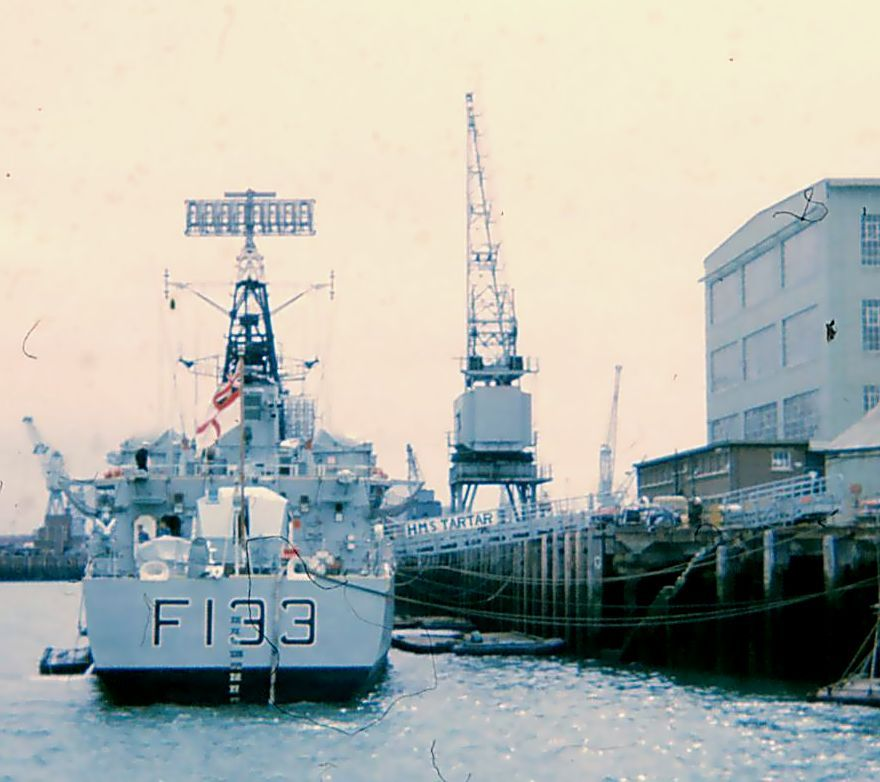
Tartar in Portsmouth, July 1977

HMS Tartar (F133) was a Tribal-class frigate of the Royal Navy (RN). She was named after the Tartar people, most of whom were located in Asia and Eastern Europe. She was sold to the Indonesian Navy in 1984 as KRI Hasanuddin (333).

Tartar was built by Devonport Dockyard, at a cost of £4,140,000. She was launched on 19 September 1960 and commissioned on 26 February 1962.

== Service history ==
=== Royal Navy ===
While in the West Indies in 1963, Tartar provided support to Trinidad after Hurricane Flora struck the Caribbean. In early December, Tartar's crew apprehended nine armed Cubans on board a ship off Cay Sal, Bahamas, where an arms cache was discovered by a ship's party.

Tartar was recommissioned on 12 January 1967 and attended Portsmouth Navy Days later that year. The frigate arrived in the Persian Gulf in 1968 via Simonstown, Mombasa and the Seychelles.

On 29 March 1968, Tartar and the amphibious assault vessel Intrepid were deployed to patrol off the Greater and Lesser Tunbs, small islands in the Persian Gulf, to deter Iran from occupying the islands. Between 1969 and 1971 she was commanded by Captain Cameron Rusby. On the voyage to the Seychelles the fleet auxiliary vessel RFA Ennerdale was lost, having struck a submerged object. Service in the Gulf was followed by a homeward journey via the Beira Patrol lasting six weeks and Cape Town thence to Gibraltar arriving during the talks between Harold Wilson, Prime Minister and Ian Smith from Rhodesia on board the cruiser Tiger.

In 1975, Tartar undertook fishery protection duties in the Barents Sea. She supported operations during the Third Cod War with Iceland. During the dispute, Tartar was rammed by the patrol vessel ICGV Týr on 1 April 1976, and by ICGV Ægir on 6 May. In total, Tartar spent six weeks on fisheries protection patrols in the Third Cod War, and was involved in four collisions. Later that year, in the West Indies, Tartar searched for and located the wreckage of Cubana Flight 455. She was present at the Spithead Fleet Review in 1977, held in honour of Queen Elizabeth II's Silver Jubilee. At this time she was part of the 1st Frigate Squadron.

Tartar was reduced to reserve in 1980, being placed in the Standby Squadron. She was taken out of reserve during the Falklands War and restored for active service. The frigate did not deploy to the South Atlantic, however, instead operating in home waters in the absence of other warships. She did deploy to the West Indies as a guardship in 1982/1983 for 3 months, spending Christmas and New Year in St Petersburg, Florida. In June 1983, Tartar's Westland Wasp helicopter evacuated the six-man crew of the supply ship MV Spearfish, which had collided with an oil rig in the English Channel. As a potential hazard to navigation, Spearfish had to be sunk by the guns of Tartar.

=== Indonesian Navy ===
Tartar was decommissioned in March 1984 and sold to Indonesia. After a refit at Vosper Thornycroft's Woolston, Southampton shipyard, the ship was delivered on 22 January 1986 and was commissioned into the Indonesian Navy on 3 April 1986, with the name KRI Hasanuddin, so named after a sultan who fought the Dutch. The frigate was stricken in 2000 and her name was given to a Dutch-built Diponegoro-class corvette.

== Publications ==
- Blackman, Raymond V. B., ed. (1971). Jane's Fighting Ships 1971–72. London: Sampson Low, Marston & Co., Ltd. ISBN 0-354-00096-9.
- Colledge, J. J.; Warlow, Ben (2010) [1969]. Ships of the Royal Navy: The Complete Record of all Fighting Ships of the Royal Navy (4th Rev ed.). London: Chatham. ISBN 978-1-935149-07-1.
- Gardiner, Robert & Chesneau, Roger (1995), Conway's All the World's Fighting Ships 1947–1995, Conway Maritime Press, London, ISBN 978-0-8517-7605-7.
- Prézelin, Bernard; Baker, A. D. III, eds. (1990). The Naval Institute Guide to Combat Fleets of the World 1990/1991. Annapolis, Maryland, USA: Naval Institute Press. ISBN 0-87021-250-8.
- Marriott, Leo, 1983. Royal Navy Frigates 1945–1983, Ian Allan Ltd. ISBN 07110 1322 5
- Roberts, John (2009). Safeguarding the Nation: The Story of the Modern Royal Navy. Annapolis, Maryland, USA: Naval Institute Press. ISBN 978-1-59114-812-8.
- Wertheim, Eric (2005). Combat Fleets of the World 2005–2006: Their Ships, Aircraft, and Systems. Annapolis, Maryland, US: Naval Institute Press. ISBN 1-59114-934-7.
