= Tribal-class frigate =

Class of frigates built for the Royal Navy

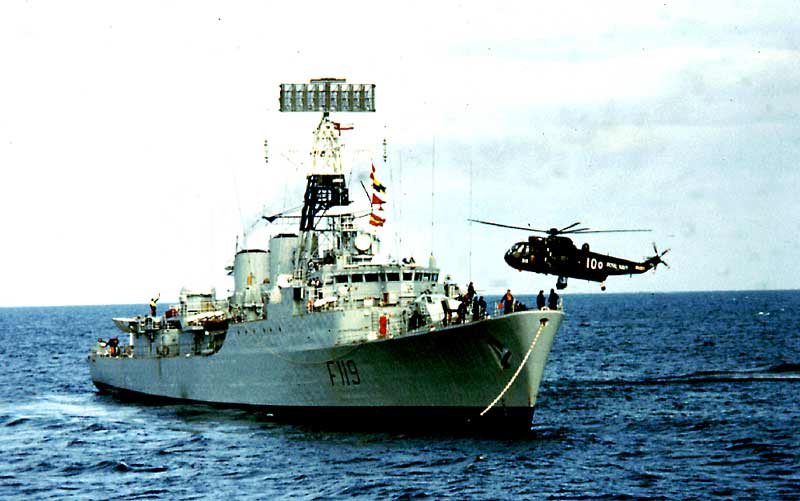
- HMS Eskimo

Class overview
- Name: Type 81 or Tribal class
- Operators: Royal Navy; Indonesian Navy
- Preceded by: Blackwood class
- Succeeded by: Type 21
- Built: 1958–1964
- In commission: 1961–2000
- Completed: 7
- Retired: 7

General characteristics
- Type: Frigate
- Displacement: 2,300 long tons (2,300 t) standard; 2,700 long tons (2,700 t) full load
- Length: 360 ft 0 in (109.73 m) oa; 350 ft 0 in (106.68 m) pp
- Beam: 42 ft 3 in (12.88 m)
- Draught: 13 ft 3 in (4.04 m); 17 ft 6 in (5.33 m) (propellers)
- Propulsion: Single-shaft COSAG; 1 Steam turbine 12,500 shp (9,300 kW); 1 Metrovick G-6 gas turbine 7,500 shp (5,600 kW)
- Speed: 27 knots (50 km/h; 31 mph) (COSAG)
- Range: 4,500 nautical miles (8,300 km; 5,200 mi) at 12 knots (22 km/h; 14 mph)
- Complement: 253
- Sensors & processing systems: Radar type 965 air-search; Radar type 993 low-angle search; Radar type 978 navigation; Radar type 903 gunnery fire-control; Radar type 262 GWS-21 fire-control; Sonar type 177 search; Sonar type 170 attack; Sonar type 162 bottom profiling; Ashanti and Gurkha; Sonar type 199 variable-depth
- Armament: 2 × single QF 4.5 inch (113 mm) Mark 5* Mod 1 guns; 2 × single Mark 7 40 mm Bofors guns, later; 2 × four-rail GWS-20 Seacat missile systems; 2 × single 20 mm Oerlikon guns; 1 × Mark 10 Limbo ASW mortar
- Aircraft carried: 1 × Westland Wasp helicopter

The Type 81, or Tribal class, frigates were ordered and built as sloops to carry out similar duties to the immediate post-war improved Black Swan-class sloops and Loch-class frigates in the Persian Gulf. In the mid-1960s, the seven Tribals were reclassified as second-class general-purpose frigates to maintain frigate numbers. After the British withdrawal from East of Suez in 1971, the Tribals operated in the NATO North Atlantic sphere with the only update being the fitting of Seacat missiles to all by 1977, limited by their single propeller and low speed of 24 knots. In 1979–80, age and crew and fuel shortages saw them transferred to the stand-by squadrons; three were reactivated in 1982 during the Falklands War for training and guardship duties in the West Indies.

== History ==
The Tribals were designed during the 1950s as a response to the increasing cost of single-role vessels such as the Type 14s. They were the first such 'multi-role' vessels for the Royal Navy. They were designed specifically with colonial 'gunboat' duties in mind, particularly in the Middle East. They were therefore designed to be self-contained warships with weapon and sensor systems to cover many possible engagements, air conditioning to allow extended tropical deployment and such 'modern' habitability features as all bunk accommodation (as opposed to hammocks). The fitting of gas turbine boost engines was specifically intended to allow the frigates to almost instantly leave ports and naval bases in the event of nuclear war, rather than have to spend four to six hours to flash up the steam boilers. The G6 gas turbine proved reliable and was generally used to leave port during the frigates' career, and paved the way for gas turbine propulsion to become universal in the RN within 30 years.

== Design ==
They were the first class of the Royal Navy to be designed from the start to operate a helicopter and the first small escorts to carry a long-range air search radar, the Type 965 with a single 'rake' AKE-1 antenna. They were armed with two QF 4.5-in (113 mm) Mark 5 guns salvaged from scrapped Second World War destroyers. Although these mountings were refurbished with Remote Power Control (RPC) operation, they still required manual loading on an exposed open back.

Originally, the intended gun armament was two twin 4-inch (102 mm) Second World War standard mounts, then twin 3-inch (76 mm) 70 caliber mounts, which 256 ton weight for 2 turrets was too heavy. A lighter automatic gun fit of two N(R) single automatic 4-inch guns, as fitted in Chile's Almirante-class destroyer , still required a hull 10 ft (3.0 m) longer and, like twin 3/70s, were too expensive.

A 3000-ton displacement exceeded the limit the UK Treasury would allow for a sloop or frigate design in the 1960s so both automatic guns were rejected on account of weight, space and cost. Even though they provided a realistic solution to the RN AA/ DP gun requirement, due to cost, and the problem of the cost of developing stocks and logistic support, for new types of ammunition and doubt about the usefulness of medium gun AA against post-1962 jet air and missile targets.

From the outset, they were designed to carry the new GWS-21 Seacat anti-aircraft missile system anti-aircraft missile system but all except Zulu initially carried single Mark 7 40 mm Bofors guns in lieu. The rest of the class were fitted with Seacat in the 1970s using surplus missile systems, left over from Battle-class destroyers and County-class destroyer refits.

The Tribals were the first modern RN ships designed to use a combination of power sources, a feature which had been trialled with limited success in the 1930s in the minelayer HMS Adventure. An additive mix of steam and gas turbine called "Combined Steam and Gas" COSAG was used. This gave the rapid start-up and acceleration of a gas turbine engine, coupled with the cruising efficiency and reliability of the steam turbine. They would cruise on the steam plant and use both systems, driving the same shaft for a high-speed "boost". They faced challenges due to being single-shaft vessels, which greatly restricted their maneuverability, acceleration, and deceleration. This limitation became particularly evident during the Cod Wars of the 1970s, where their single screw hindered their ability to maneuver effectively in ramming situations against Icelandic coast guard cutters. The cramped, awkward nature of the helicopter pad and handling provision was also exposed in the 1976 Cod War and was a major reason that some Rothesay-class frigates were given further refits in preference to the Tribals and maintained in higher status reserve in the early 1980s limitations on defence spending.

== Shortcomings ==
The costs for the Tribal Class ships escalated above the costs first envisaged, and the original order of ships (over twenty) was cancelled after the first seven ships had been completed. Only four would have been built if it had been possible to cancel the contractual commitments the Royal Navy had entered into for the supply of complex engines and machinery for eight frigates. The ships were rather small, at 360 ft (110 m), which reduced the options for later modernisation and were always going to be limited by their single-shaft propulsion. The class were still good warships despite being fitted with outdated guns, (they were described by some as 'guided flagpoles') if sometimes capable of 18 rounds per minute for the first two minutes, and proved the usefulness of the general purpose frigate concept and gas turbine propulsion, but the average unit costs of the Type 81s completed in 1963-64 was £500,000 more than the first eight Leanders and the final cost of over £5 million of the first Tribal, Ashanti, completed in 1961 was considered too high and hence limited the number built; the original intent was to build 23 Type 81s. This meant that further 1960s RN frigate development would be based on the more conservative steam-powered Type 12 (Whitby) class, subsequently modernised in the Type 12M (Rothesay) class and finalised in the excellent Type 12I (Leander) class. The later Royal Navy Type 21 (Amazon) class "General Purpose Frigates" were originally envisaged for a similar gunboat role to the Tribal-class ships and to operate East of Suez.

== Service ==
The class served throughout the 1960s and into the 1970s, fulfilling their designed general purpose "colonial gunboat" role. When a change in British foreign policy made this role redundant, they found themselves being pressed into service in home waters in the Cod Wars of the 1970s. They were not particularly suited to these duties, however, as they had a hull form optimised for the calm, shallow water of the Persian Gulf and with only a single shaft were unable to manoeuvre with the Icelandic patrol vessels at close quarters.

All were decommissioned from the Royal Navy during the mid-to-late 1970s, with the manpower crisis also contributing to the rapid removal of the class from service. They were, however given a brief reprieve by the Falklands War, with 3 mothballed Tribals (Gurkha, Tartar and Zulu) being reactivated to cover ships deployed to the South Atlantic or undergoing long-term repairs after the conflict. The remaining units were cannibalised for spare parts to enable the 3 ships to be refitted. These ships were sold in 1984 to Indonesia.

== Ships ==
Pennant	Name	Builder	Laid Down	Launched	Accepted into service	Commissioned	Estimated building cost	Fate
F117	Ashanti	(a) Yarrow & Co Ltd, Glasgow (b) Associated Electrical Industries Ltd, Manchester	15 January 1958	9 March 1959	November 1961	23 November 1961	£5,315,000	Sunk as target 1988
F131	Nubian	(a) HM Dockyard, Portsmouth (b) Associated Electrical Industries Ltd, Manchester	7 September 1959	6 September 1960	November 1962	9 October 1962	£4,360,000	Sunk as target 1987
F122	Gurkha	(a) J I Thornycroft & Co Ltd, Southampton (b) JI Thornycroft & Co Ltd, Southampton (steam and gas turbines) (b) Parsons Marine Turbine Co Ltd, Wallsend-on-Tyne (gearing)	3 November 1958	11 July 1960	February 1963	13 February 1963	£4,865,000	Indonesian KRI Wilhelmus Zakarias Yohannes (332), stricken 2000
F119	Eskimo	(a) J S White & Co Ltd, Cowes, Isle of Wight (b) JS White & Co Ltd, Cowes, Isle of Wight (steam and gas turbines) (b) Fairfield Shipbuilding and Engineering Co Ltd, Govan, Glasgow (gearing)	22 October 1958	20 March 1960	February 1963	21 February 1963	£4,560,000	Sunk as target 1986
F133	Tartar	(a) HM Dockyard, Devonport (b) Vickers-Armstrongs (Engineers) Ltd, Barrow-in-Furness (steam turbines and gearing) (b) Yarrow and Co Ltd, Glasgow (gas turbine)	22 October 1959	19 September 1960	April 1963	26 February 1962	£4,300,000	Indonesian KRI Hasanuddin (333), stricken 2000
F125	Mohawk	(a) Vickers-Armstrongs (Shipbuilders) Ltd, Barrow-in-Furness (b) Associated Electrical Industries Ltd, Manchester (gas turbine) (b) Vickers-Armstrongs (Engineers) Ltd, Barrow-in-Furness (steam turbines and gearing)	23 December 1960	5 April 1962	December 1963	29 November 1963	£4,750,000	Sold for scrap
F124	Zulu	(a) Alex Stephen & Sons Ltd, Linthouse, Glasgow (b) J I Thornycroft & Co Ltd, Southampton (steam and gas turbines) (b) Parsons Marine Turbine Co Ltd, Wallsend-on-Tyne (gearing)	13 December 1960	3 July 1962	April 1964	17 April 1964	£5,100,000	Indonesian KRI Martha Khristina Tiyahahu (331), stricken 2000

The building costs given above are official figures from the Navy/Defence Estimates. Note that Janes Fighting Ships quotes a slightly lower cost for Ashanti of £5,220,000, as against £5,315,000 quoted in the 1962-63 Navy Estimates.

== See also ==
- List of frigate classes by country

Equivalent frigates of the same era

- Garcia class
- Oslo class
- Köln class
- Leander class
- Bronstein class
- João Belo class
- Commandant Rivière class
