= Seacat (missile) =

British surface-to-air missile system

- Seacat GWS-20 series missile
- Type: Surface-to-air missile
- Place of origin: United Kingdom

Service history
- In service: 1962 – early 2000's
- Used by: See operators
- Wars: 1971 Indo-Pakistani War; Iran–Iraq War; Falklands War; South African Border War

Production history
- Designer: Short Brothers
- Manufacturer: Short Brothers
- Variants: See variants

Specifications
- Mass: 68 kg (150 lb)
- Length: 1.48 m (58 in)
- Diameter: 0.22 m (8.7 in)
- Wingspan: 0.70 m (28 in)
- Warhead: 40 lb (18 kg) continuous-rod warhead
- Detonation mechanism: Proximity
- Engine: 2 stage motor
- Operational range: 500–5,000 m (1,600–16,400 ft) or more
- Maximum speed: Mach 0.8
- Guidance system: CLOS and radio link
- Steering system: Control surfaces
- Launch platform: Ship

Seacat is a British short-range surface-to-air missile system intended to replace the ubiquitous Bofors 40 mm gun aboard warships of all sizes. It was the world's first operational shipboard point-defence missile system, and was designed so that the Bofors guns could be replaced with minimum modification to the recipient vessel and (originally) using existing fire-control systems. A mobile land-based version of the system was known as Tigercat.

The initial GWS.20 version was manually controlled, in keeping with the need for a rapidly developed and deployed system. Several variants followed; GWS.21 added radar-cued manual control for night and bad-weather use, GWS.22 added a SACLOS automatic guidance mode, and the final GWS.24 had fully automatic engagement.

Seacat and Tigercat would both see notable success on the export market. While Tigercat only saw relatively brief service in Britain before being replaced by Rapier, other users would continue to use it into the 1990's. Seacat would see adoption by over a dozen navies before being gradually replaced by more modern missile system such as Sea Wolf and gun-based close-in weapons systems. Most users retired the system during the 1990's and early 2000's.

== History ==
Seacat traces its history to the Short Brothers of Belfast SX-A5 experiments to convert the Malkara anti-tank missile to radio control as a short-range surface-to-air missile. This led to further modifications as the Green Light prototype, and finally emerged as Seacat.

As it was based on an anti-tank weapon, the Seacat was small and flew at relatively slow, subsonic speeds. It was thought to be useful against first and second generation 1950s jet aircraft of Hawker Sea Hawk performance, which were proving to be too difficult for the WWII-era Bofors 40 mm L/60 guns to successfully intercept. Another system, Orange Nell, was being developed for this role, but was cancelled when the Navy concluded it would not be effective against its intended targets, newer high-performance strike aircraft.

The first public reference to the name Seacat was April 1958, when Shorts was awarded a contract to develop a close-in short-range surface-to-air missile. Royal Navy acceptance of Seacat as a point defence system, (Note: Rear Admiral Enerble said in 1960 that Seacat was so accurate it could be directed through a small window in the Admiralty.) to replace the 40/L60 or the newer and more effective Bofors 40mm /L70 with proximity fuzed shells. It would also be useful against large, slow anti-shipping missiles, like the Styx, which was being deployed by the Warsaw Pact and various clients of the Soviet Union. It was also seen as offering useful secondary roles as a lightweight weapon to use against light commercial shipping and fast attack craft.

The missile was shown for the first time to the general public at the 1959 Farnborough Air Show. The first acceptance trials of the Seacat on a warship was in 1961 aboard HMS Decoy. The Seacat became the first operational guided missile to be fired by a warship of the Royal Navy. Later it was adopted by the Swedish Navy, making it the first British guided missile to be fired by a foreign navy.

== Design ==
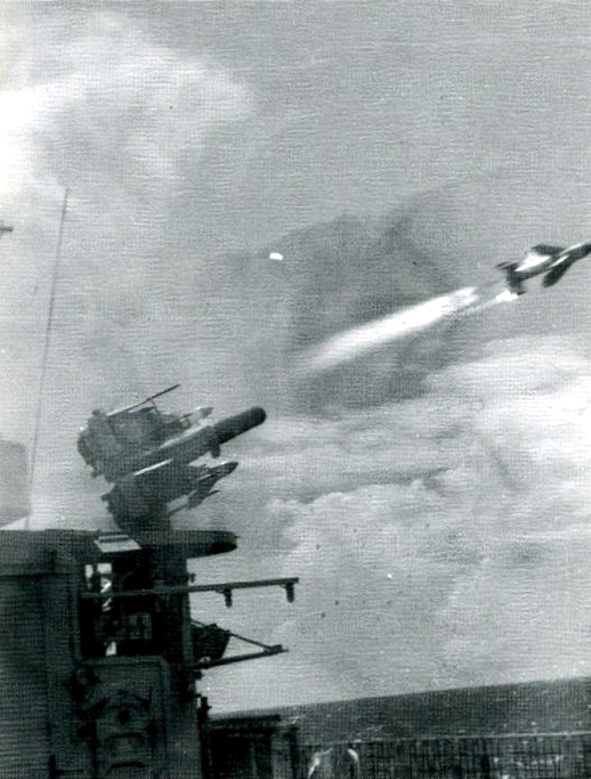
A Seacat missile being fired from the Netherlands frigate HNLMS Evertsen

The Seacat is a small, subsonic missile powered by a two-stage solid fuel rocket motor. It is steered in flight by four cruciformly arranged swept wings and is stabilised by four small tail fins. It is guided by command line-of-sight (CLOS) via a radio-link; i.e., flight commands are transmitted to it from a remote operator with both the missile and target in sight. In some senses it was no more than an initially unguided subsonic rocket that took the controller about 7 seconds or 500 yd (460 m) flight time to acquire and lock onto radar tracking and optical direction, making it unsuitable for close-in AA defence.

Seacat was mounted on a powered four-round launcher which was smaller than the Mark 5 Twin Bofors and STAAG type mountings it replaced. It was also lighter, easier to maintain, and very easy to use. (Note: The RNZN officer sent to the UK to investigate Seacat in 1961 commented that it was "so ridiculously easy to use, we have to have it" according to ret Capt. Ian Bradley.)

== Variants ==
Initially, all Seacat installations used a 4-round, 6,600 lb (3,000 kg) trainable launcher, but a 3-round, 2,800 lb (1,300 kg) launcher was later developed. Both launchers were manually reloaded and carried an antenna for the radio command link. All that was required to fit the system to a ship was the installation of a launcher, the provision of a missile handling room and a suitable guidance system. Seacat was used by NATO and Commonwealth navies that purchased British equipment and was exported worldwide. It has also been integrated with a variety of alternative guidance systems, the most common being Dutch HSA systems. The four systems used by the Royal Navy are described below.

=== GWS-20 ===
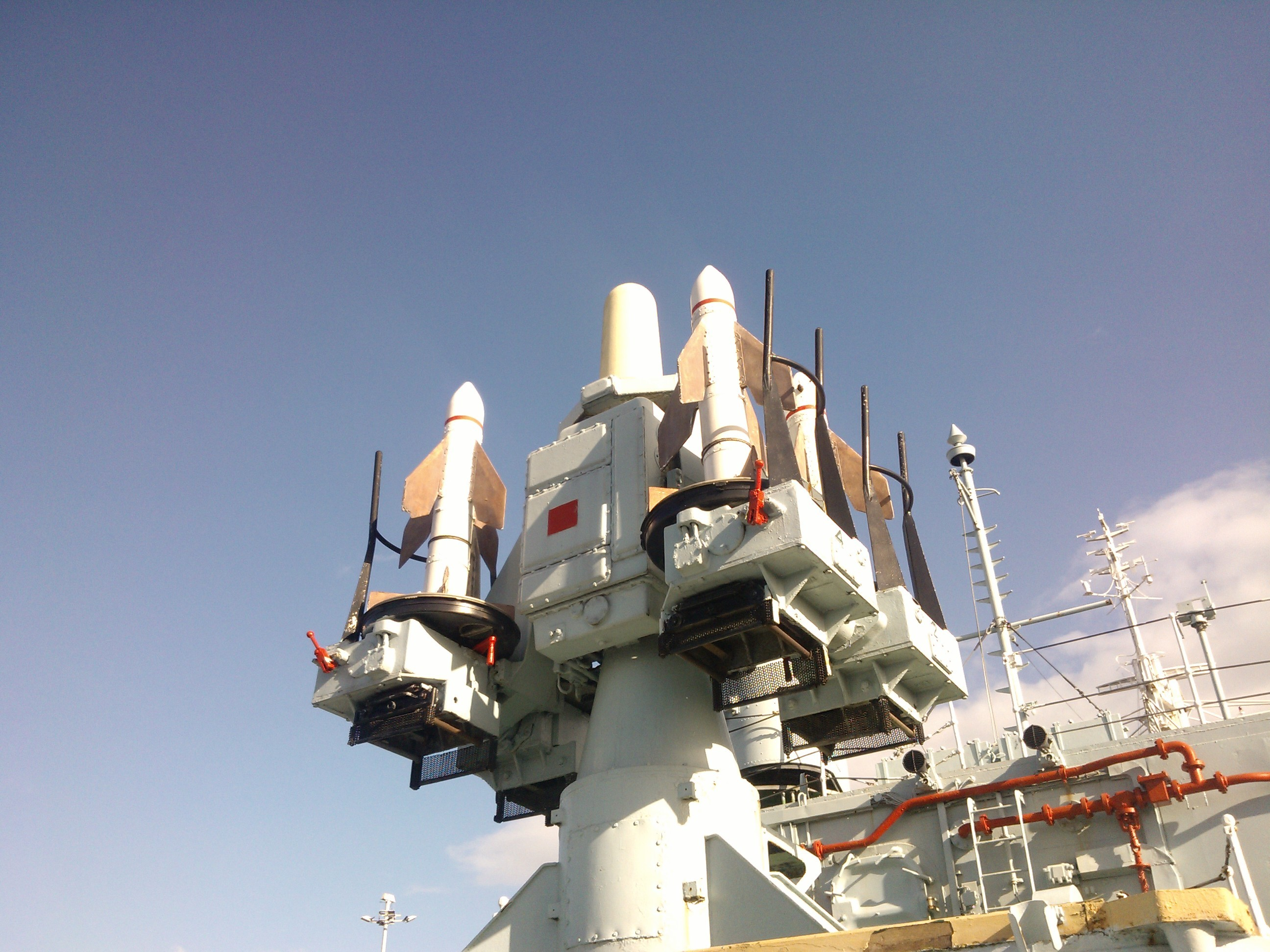
GWS-20 Seacat launcher aboard HMS Cavalier

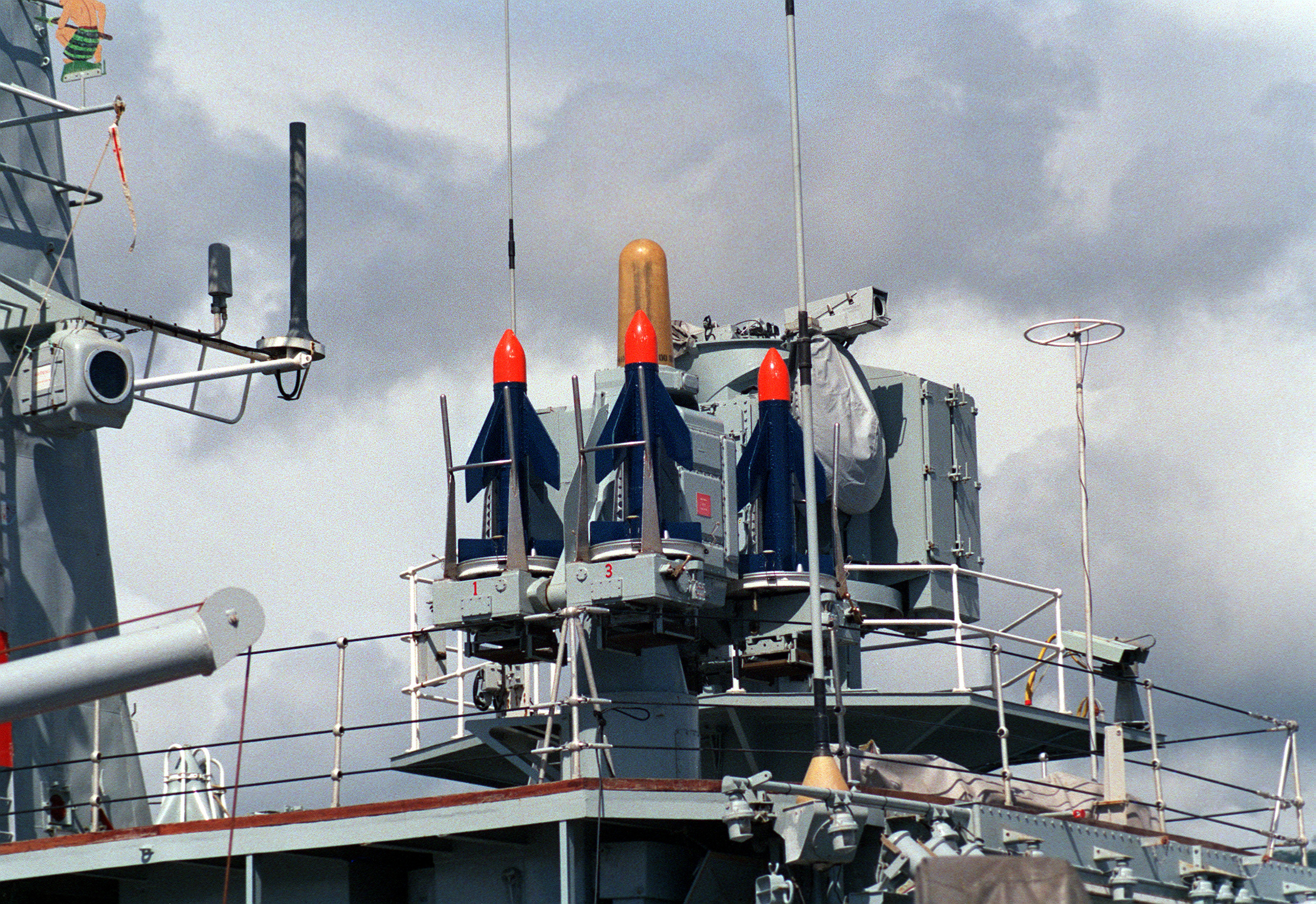
Seacat launcher and GWS-22 director on HMNZS Wellington, a Leander-class frigate. The orange dome houses the antenna for transmitting commands to the missile

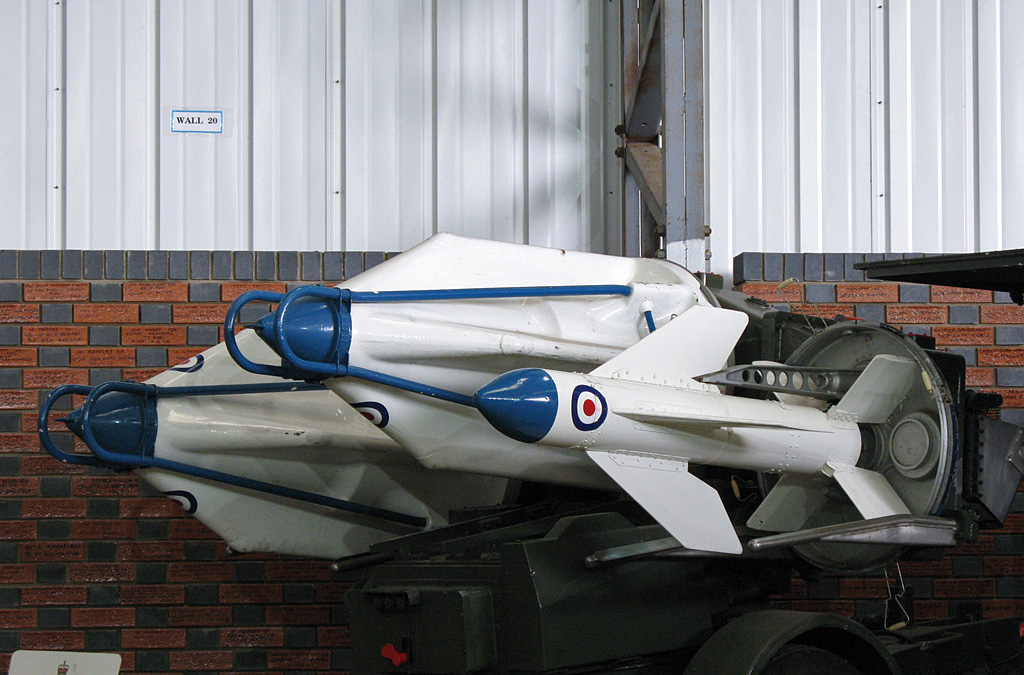
Tigercat three-missile launcher, with inert training round (right) and transit covers in place

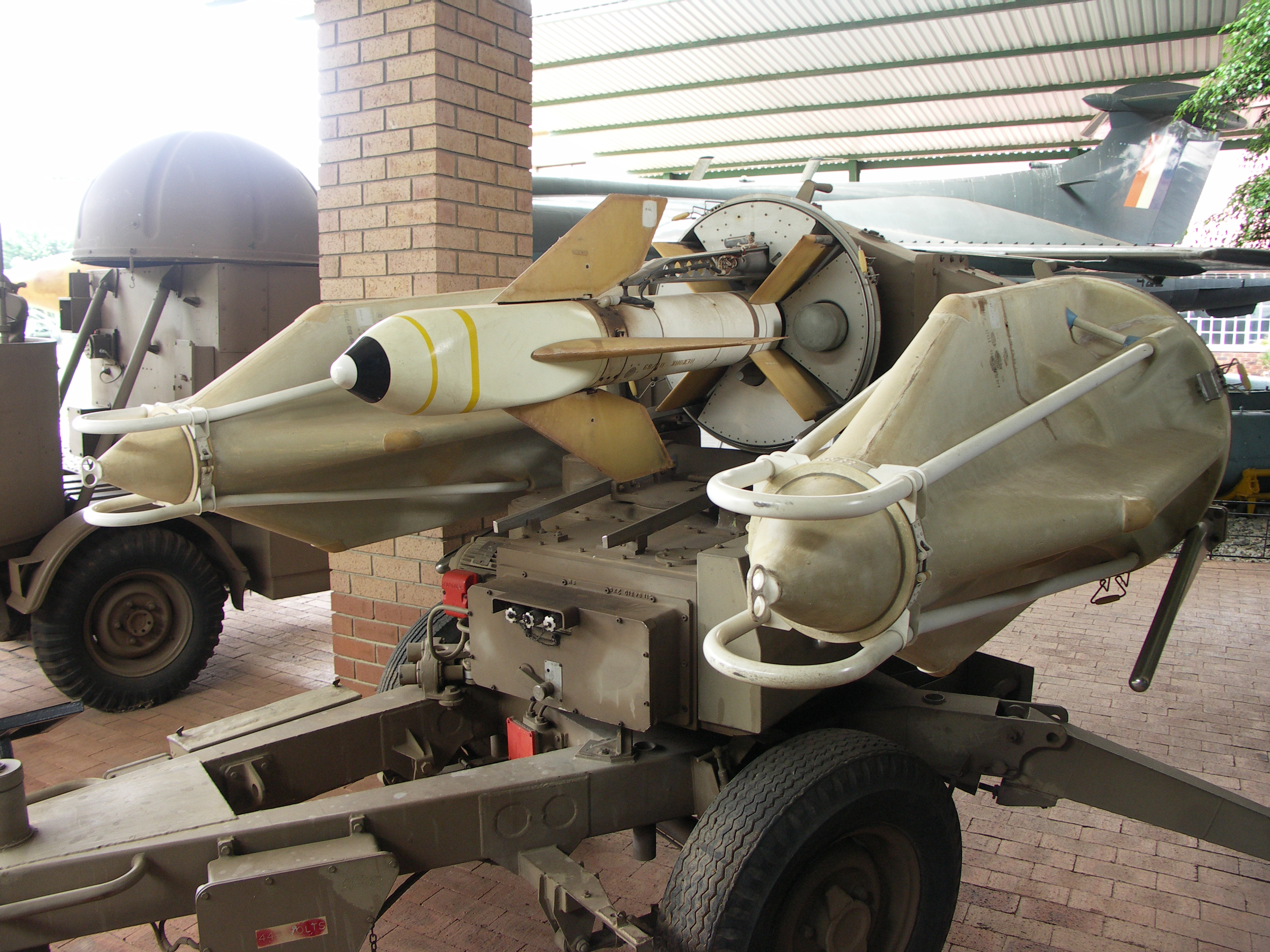
SADF Hilda (Tigercat) missiles on launcher

This - "Guided Weapon System 20" - was the initial system, which was intended to replace the twin 40 mm Bofors Mark V gun and its associated fire-control systems. The original director was based on the Simple Tachymetric Director (STD) and was entirely visual in operation. The target was acquired visually with the missile being guided, via a radio link, by the operator inputting commands on a joystick. Flares on the missile's tail fins aided identifying the missile.

HMS Eagle's GWS-20 was trialled on board HMS Decoy, a Daring-class destroyer, in 1961; it was subsequently removed. It was carried in active service by the Fearless-class landing ships, the Type 12M (Rothesay-class) and Type 12I (Leander-class) frigates, the Type 61 (Salisbury-class) air defence frigates HMS Lincoln and HMS Salisbury, and the first group of County-class destroyers. HMS Kent and HMS London updated to GWS22 in the early 1970s. It was originally intended that all C-class destroyers should receive GWS20, and the class were prepared accordingly. In the event only HMS Cavalier and HMS Caprice received it, in 1966 refits.

GWS-20 saw active service in the Falklands War on board the Fearless class and the Rothesay frigates HMS Plymouth and HMS Yarmouth, which retained the GWS-20 director when upgraded to GWS-22.

=== GWS-21 ===
GWS-21 was the Seacat system associated with a modified Close Range Blind Fire analogue fire control director (CRBFD) with Type 262 radar. This offered manual radar-assisted (Dark Fire) tracking and guidance modes as well as 'eyeball' visual modes. It was carried as the design anti-aircraft weapon of the Type 81 (Tribal-class) frigate, the four Battle-class AD conversions, on the first four County-class destroyers, HMNZS Otago and HMNZS Taranaki, and the carrier HMS Eagle. It was last used after sale to the Indonesian Navy and refit by Vosper Thornycroft in 1984 of, the Type 81s Tartar, Ashanti and Gurkha.

=== GWS-22 ===
GWS-22 was the Seacat system associated with the full MRS-3 fire control director with Type 904 radar and was the first ACLOS-capable (Automatic, Command Line-Of-Sight) Seacat. It was fitted to most of the Leander, Rothesay and County-class escorts as they were refitted and modified in the 1970s, as well as the aircraft carrier HMS Hermes. It could operate in automatic radar-guided (Blindfire), manual radar-guided, manual CCTV-guided or, in an emergency, 'eyeball' guided modes. It saw active service in the Falklands onboard all these classes. Launchers were fitted to the Tiger-class cruisers HMS Tiger and HMS Blake when these were converted to helicopter carriers in the 1960s; replacing the port and starboard twin 3-inch gun turrets amidships on each ship.

=== GWS-24 ===
The final Royal Navy Seacat variant, this used the Italian Alenia Orion RTN-10X fire control system with Type 912 radar and was fitted only to the Type 21 frigate. This variant saw active service in the Falklands.

=== Tigercat ===
A land-based mobile version of Seacat based on a three-round, trailer-mounted launcher towed by a Land Rover with a second trailer carrying fire control equipment. Tigercat was used exclusively by 48 Squadron RAF Regiment between 1967 and 1978, before being replaced by Rapier. Tigercat was also operated by; India, Iran, Jordan, South Africa and Qatar and saw limited service in the 1982 Falklands War with Argentina.

=== Hellcat ===
"Hellcat", an air-to-surface version to give British Westland Wasp or Westland Wessex HU.5 helicopters a capability against fast attack craft and other high-speed naval targets, was considered in the late 1960s. Two missiles would be carried on a pair of pylons on the helicopter, with an optical sight mounted through the cabin roof. Hellcat was also considered for counter-insurgency (COIN) purposes, with four missiles carried on a militarised Short Skyvan. Despite being offered by Shorts for some years, it does not seem to have been sold.

=== Seacat Target ===
"Seacat Target" is a specialised target vehicle based on the Seacat and is used to simulate sea-skimming missiles for practising a ship's air defence against. Introduced in 1986 it uses the first and second stages of Seacat with the addition of a special target head in place of the missile's warhead. The target missile can be fired from the standard Seacat launcher.

== Service ==
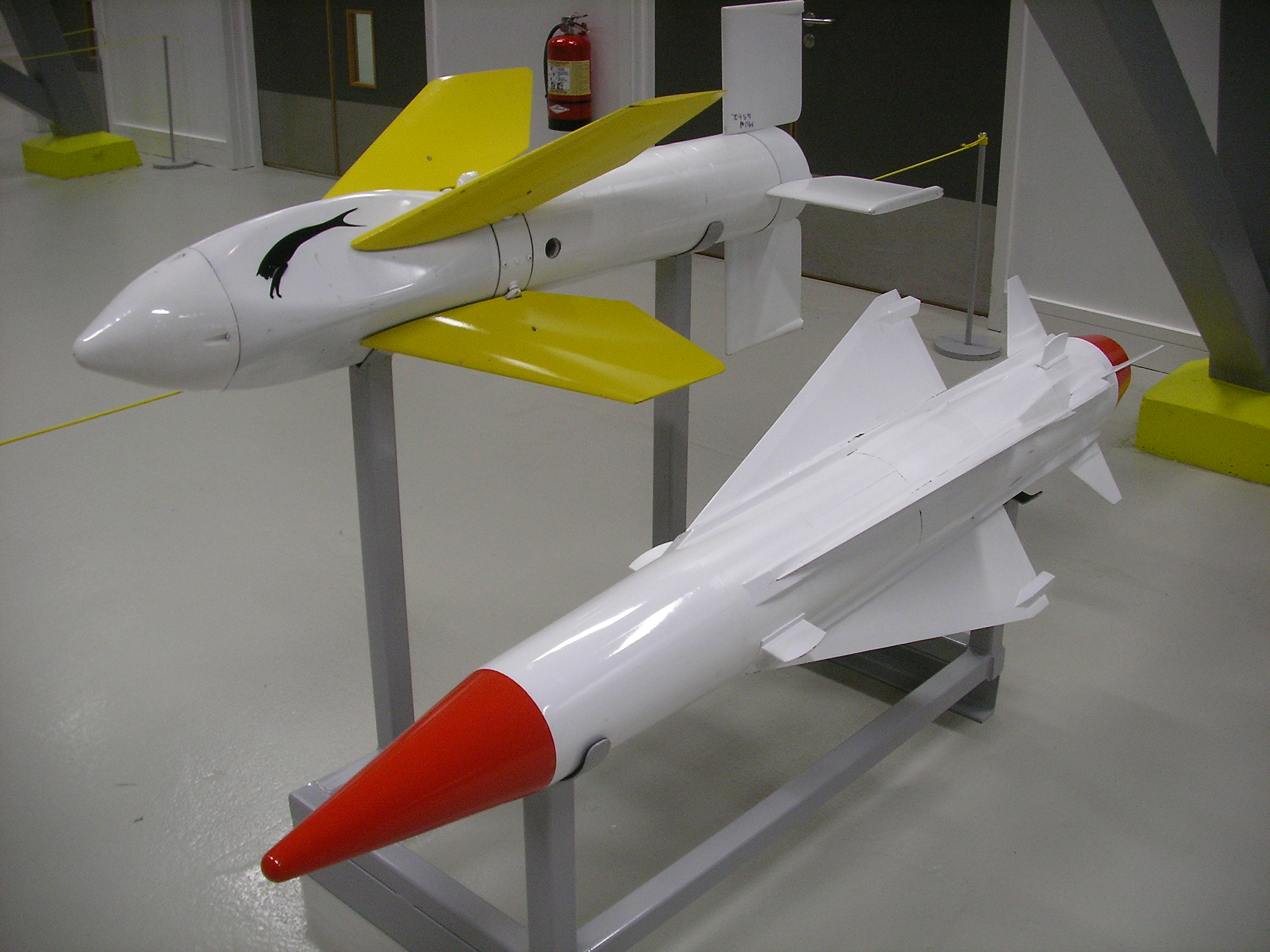
Seacat (upper) and Sea Wolf missiles on display in IWM Duxford

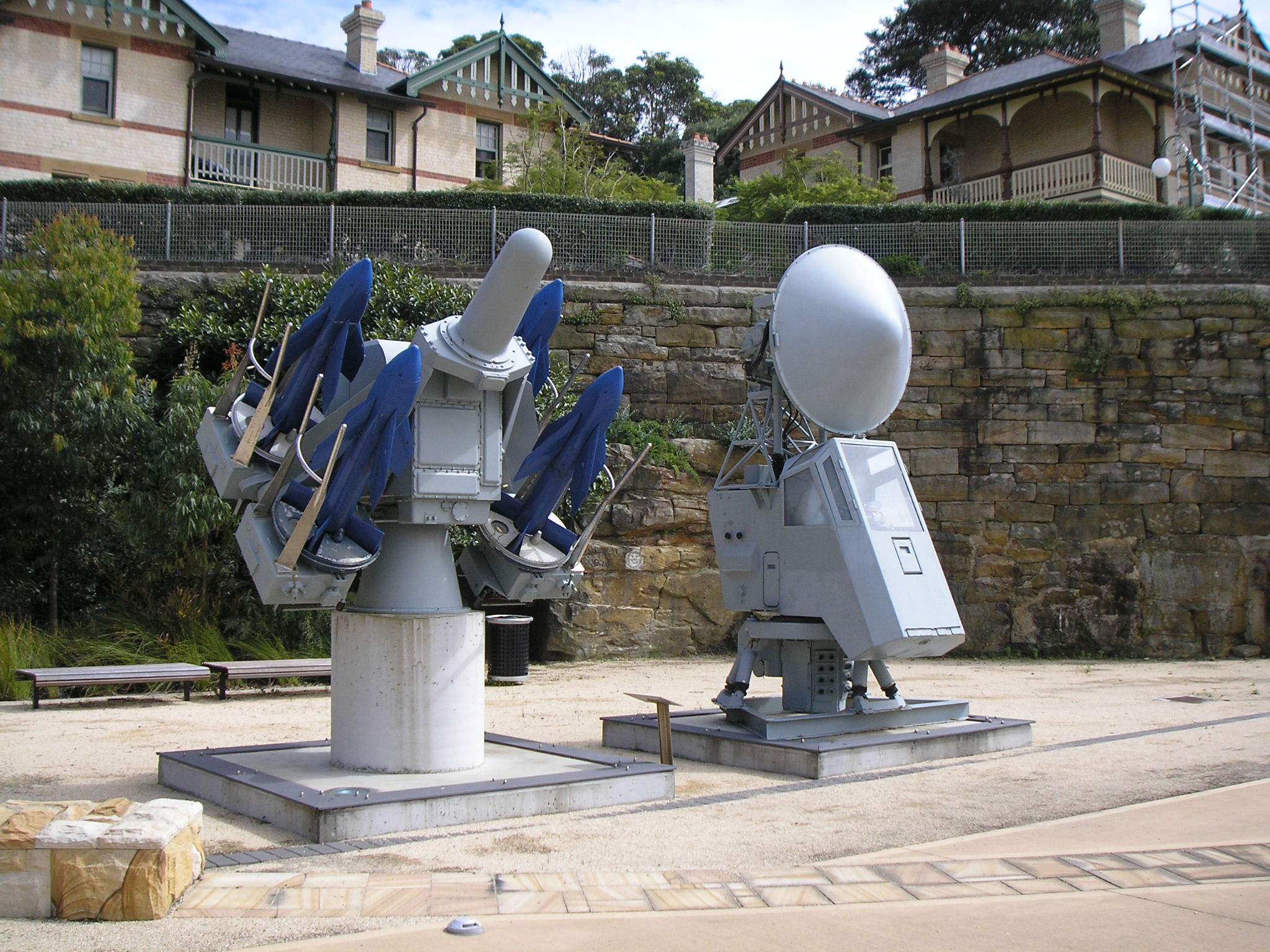
A Seacat launcher and M44 director at the Royal Australian Navy Heritage Centre, Sydney

The first warship to have the system fitted operationally was the Battle-class destroyer, HMS Corunna, in February 1962. The oldest Seacat versions became obsolete by the 1970s due to increasing aircraft speed and the introduction of supersonic, sea-skimming anti-ship missiles. In service the newer radar guided GWS-22 and GWS-24 versions mostly replaced the older manual control versions.

=== Falklands conflict ===
Despite being obsolete, the Seacat was still widely fielded by the Royal Navy at the outbreak of the Falklands War and was the main anti-aircraft defence of many ships. It proved more reliable than the more modern Sea Wolf missile that had been recently introduced, although HMS Ardent's launcher failed at a critical moment when the ship was under air attack. Initial British postwar reports claimed that Seacat had destroyed eight aircraft, but these did not stand up to scrutiny and no "kill" could be solely attributed to the Seacat, despite it being fired on many occasions.

Seacat may have been involved in the destruction of three Argentine A-4C Skyhawks although these aircraft were subjected to the full force of San Carlos air defences; other claims to the same kills include Army Rapier and Blowpipe missiles and ship-based 40 mm gunfire. On 12 June, HMS Glamorgan launched a Seacat at an incoming Exocet missile which may have been deviated by the close detonation, but not enough to cause a miss. The destroyer was hit and heavily damaged in the attack.

Argentina deployed Tigercats from GADA 601. Seven Tigercat launchers were captured by the British after the war, some being ex-RAF units.

After the Falklands conflict, a radical and urgent re-appraisal of anti-aircraft weaponry was undertaken by the Royal Navy. This saw Seacat rapidly withdrawn from service and replaced by modern weapons systems such as the Goalkeeper CIWS, more modern 20 mm and 30 mm anti-aircraft guns and new escorts carrying the Sea Wolf missile, including the vertical launch version.

=== Sweden ===
GWS-21 missiles were fitted to the four Swedish Östergötland-class destroyers under the designation Rb 07, replacing three Bofors L/70 guns (a more modern and heavier variant than the Royal Navy's L/60) with a single launcher on each ship. The Östergötland-class destroyers, which were of late 1950s origin, were retired in the early 1980s.

=== Australia ===
Seacat was mounted on all six River-class destroyer escorts of the Royal Australian Navy and was removed from service when the final ship of this class was decommissioned in the late 1990s. In their final variant, fire control was provided by HSA M44 radar/optical directors. Secondary firing positions based on visual tracking of the target through binoculars mounted on a syncro-feedback mount was also available. HMAS Torrens was the final ship to live fire the system prior to its removal from service; and this was also the only time three missiles were on the launcher and fired in sequence, resulting in one miss and two hits on towed targets.

== Operators ==
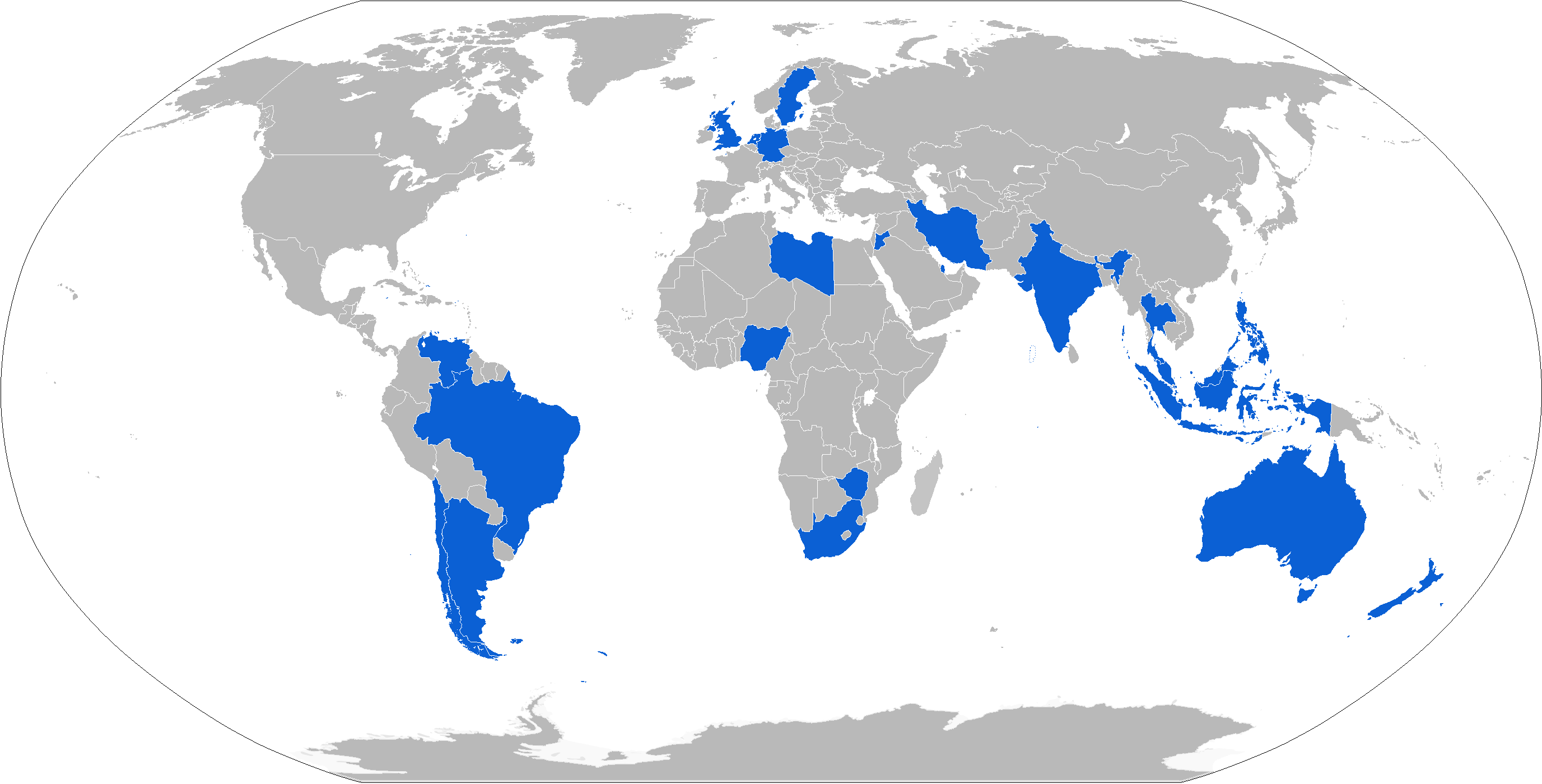
Map with Sea Cat operators in blue

- Argentina
  - Argentine Army: Four Tigercat launchers captured in the Falklands Conflict.
  - Argentine Navy: Two Seacat launchers installed on the cruiser ARA General Belgrano in 1967
  - Argentine Marines: Three Argentine Marines' Tigercat launchers captured in the Falklands Conflict. Now replaced with RBS 70.
- Australia
  - Royal Australian Navy
- Brazil
  - Brazilian Navy
- Chile
  - Chilean Navy
- Germany
- Indonesia
  - Indonesian Navy - GWS-21 Variant
- India
  - Indian Army – Tigercat
  - Indian Navy – Seacat
- Iran
  - Imperial Iranian Air Force – Tigercat
  - Islamic Republic of Iran Army – Tigercat
  - Islamic Republic of Iran Navy – Seacat
- Jordan
  - Royal Jordanian Land Force – Tigercat
- Libya
  - Libyan Navy
- Malaysia
  - Royal Malaysian Navy
- New Zealand
  - Royal New Zealand Navy
- Netherlands
  - Royal Netherlands Navy
- Nigeria
  - Nigerian Navy
- Pakistan
  - Pakistan Navy Type 21 frigate
- Qatar
  - Military of Qatar – Tigercat
- South Africa
  - South African Air Force – Tigercat, known as 'Hilda' locally
- Sweden
  - Swedish Navy – Östergötland-class destroyers after refit
- Thailand
  - Royal Thai Navy
- United Kingdom
  - Royal Air Force – Tigercat
  - Royal Navy – Seacat
- Venezuela
  - Navy of Venezuela
- Zimbabwe
  - Army of Zimbabwe – Tigercat

== See also ==
- Rainbow Codes

== Sources ==
- Naval Armament, Doug Richardson, Jane's Publishing, 1981, ISBN 0-531-03738-X
- Lippiett, Captain John (1990). Type 21. Modern Combat Ships 5. Ian Allan. ISBN 0-7110-1903-7.
- 5th Infantry Brigade in the Falklands, Nicholas Van der Bijl, David Aldea, Leo Cooper, 2003, ISBN 0850529484
- 74 Days: An Islander's Diary of the Falklands Occupation, John Smith, Century, 1984, ISBN 0712603611
- Friedman, Norman (1989). World Naval Weapons Systems. The Naval Institute Press. ISBN 0-87021-793-3.
