= Combined steam and gas =

Marine propulsion system

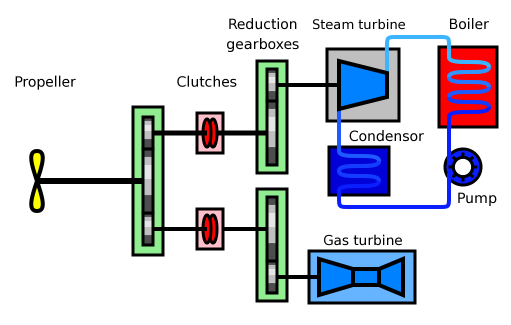
Principle of a COSAG propulsion system

Combined steam and gas (COSAG) is a propulsion system for ships using a combination of steam turbines and gas turbines to power the shafts.

Combined marine propulsion
Combined diesel or gas	(CODOG)
Combined diesel and gas	(CODAG)
Combined diesel–electric and diesel	(CODLAD)
Combined diesel–electric and gas	(CODLAG)
Combined diesel and diesel	(CODAD)
Combined steam and gas	(COSAG)
Combined gas or gas	(COGOG)
Combined gas and gas	(COGAG)
Combined gas and steam	(COGAS)
Combined nuclear and steam	(CONAS)
Integrated electric propulsion	(IEP or IFEP)

== System ==
A gearbox and clutches enable either of the engines or both of them together to drive the shaft. It has the advantage of the cruising efficiency and reliability of steam and the rapid acceleration and start-up time of gas. This system was mainly used on first-generation gas-turbine ships such as the Royal Navy's County-class destroyer and Tribal-class frigate.

== Bibliography ==
- Friedman, Norman (1993). "Propulsion". In Gardiner, Robert & Friedman, Norman (eds.). Navies in the Nuclear Age. London: Conway Maritime Press. pp. 199–210. ISBN 1-55750-613-2.
