= Cherry B =

Cherry B can refer to:

- Cherry B, a British cherry wine.
- HMS Charybdis (F75), a Leander-class frigate of the Royal Navy nicknamed the "Cherry B".
