= HMS Bacchante (F69) =

Type 12I or Leander-class frigate of the Royal Navy and Royal New Zealand Navy

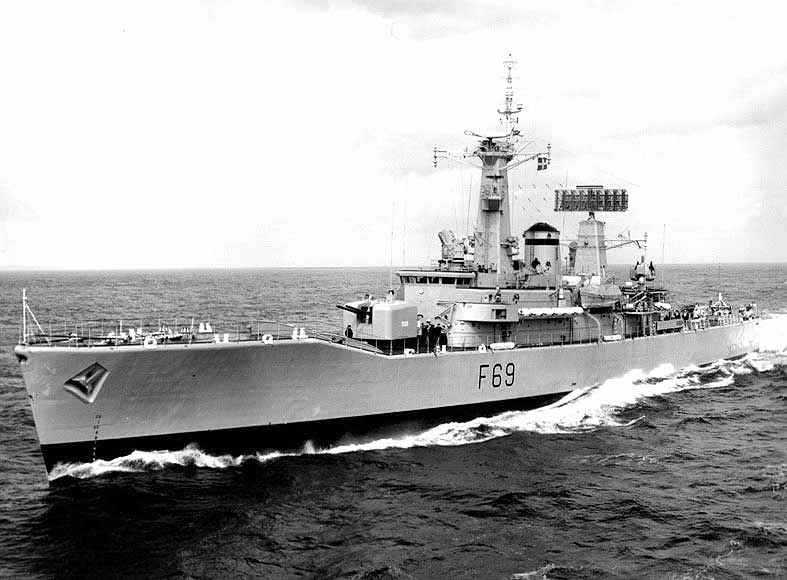
- HMS Bacchante in June 1973

History

United Kingdom
- Name: HMS Bacchante
- Builder: Vickers-Armstrongs
- Laid down: 27 October 1966
- Launched: 29 February 1968
- Commissioned: 17 October 1969
- Decommissioned: 1982
- Identification: Pennant number: F69
- Fate: Sold to Royal New Zealand Navy 1982

New Zealand
- Name: Wellington
- Commissioned: 1982
- Decommissioned: 1999
- Stricken: 2000
- Fate: Sunk in Wellington Harbour, New Zealand, 13 November 2005.

General characteristics
- Class & type: Leander-class frigate
- Displacement: 3,200 long tons (3,251 t) full load
- Length: 113.4 m (372 ft 1 in)
- Beam: 12.5 m (41 ft 0 in)
- Draught: 5.8 m (19 ft 0 in)
- Propulsion: 2 × Babcock & Wilcox boilers supplying steam to two sets of White-English Electric double-reduction geared turbines to two shafts
- Speed: 28 knots (52 km/h)
- Range: 4,600 nautical miles (8,500 km) at 15 knots (28 km/h)
- Complement: 223
- Armament: 1 × twin 4.5 inch (114 mm) guns; 1 × quadruple Sea Cat anti-aircraft missile launchers; 1 × Limbo anti-submarine mortar
- Aircraft carried: 1 × Westland Wasp helicopter

HMS Bacchante (F69) was a Leander-class frigate of the Royal Navy. Bacchante was built by Vickers-Armstrongs on the Tyne, launched on 29 February 1968 and commissioned on 17 October 1969.

== Royal Navy service ==
In 1970, Bacchante joined Standing Naval Force Atlantic (STANAVFORLANT), with which she visited a variety of ports and performed naval exercises. The following year, in 1971 Bacchante deployed to the West Indies. While there, she participated in a number of naval exercises, including an exercise with the aircraft carriers HMS Ark Royal and USS America. She acted as West Indies Guardship in 1973. During the same period, she was deployed for the Second and Third Cod Wars as part of the Fishery Protection Squadron.

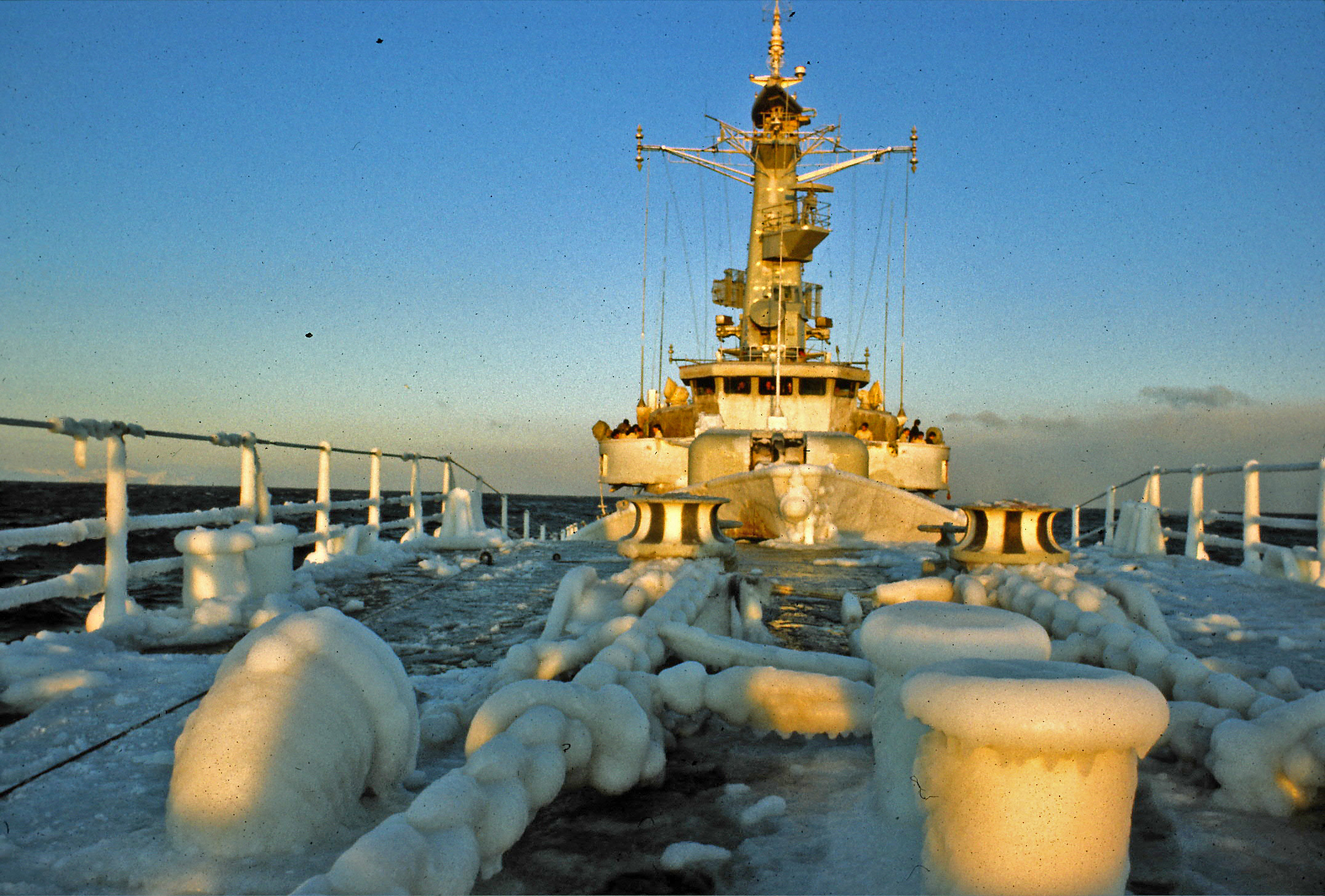
Ice on HMS Bacchante fo'c's'le off Iceland Jan 1976

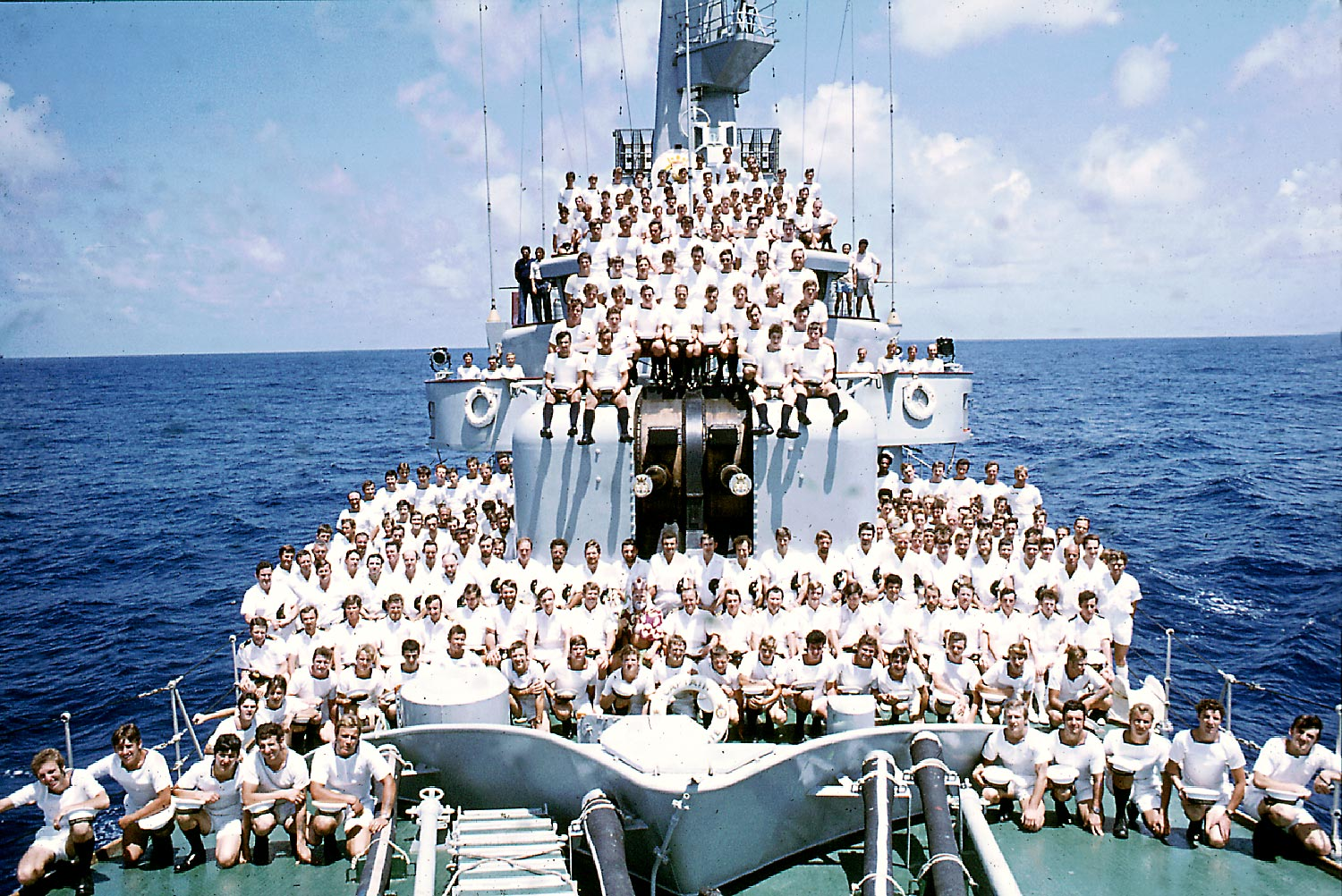
HMS Bacchante Ships company Indian Ocean Oct 76

Being one of only two frigates to emerge undamaged from the Cod War, she visited Wilmington Delaware, and then New York, to take part in the USA Bicentennial celebrations, 4th July 1976

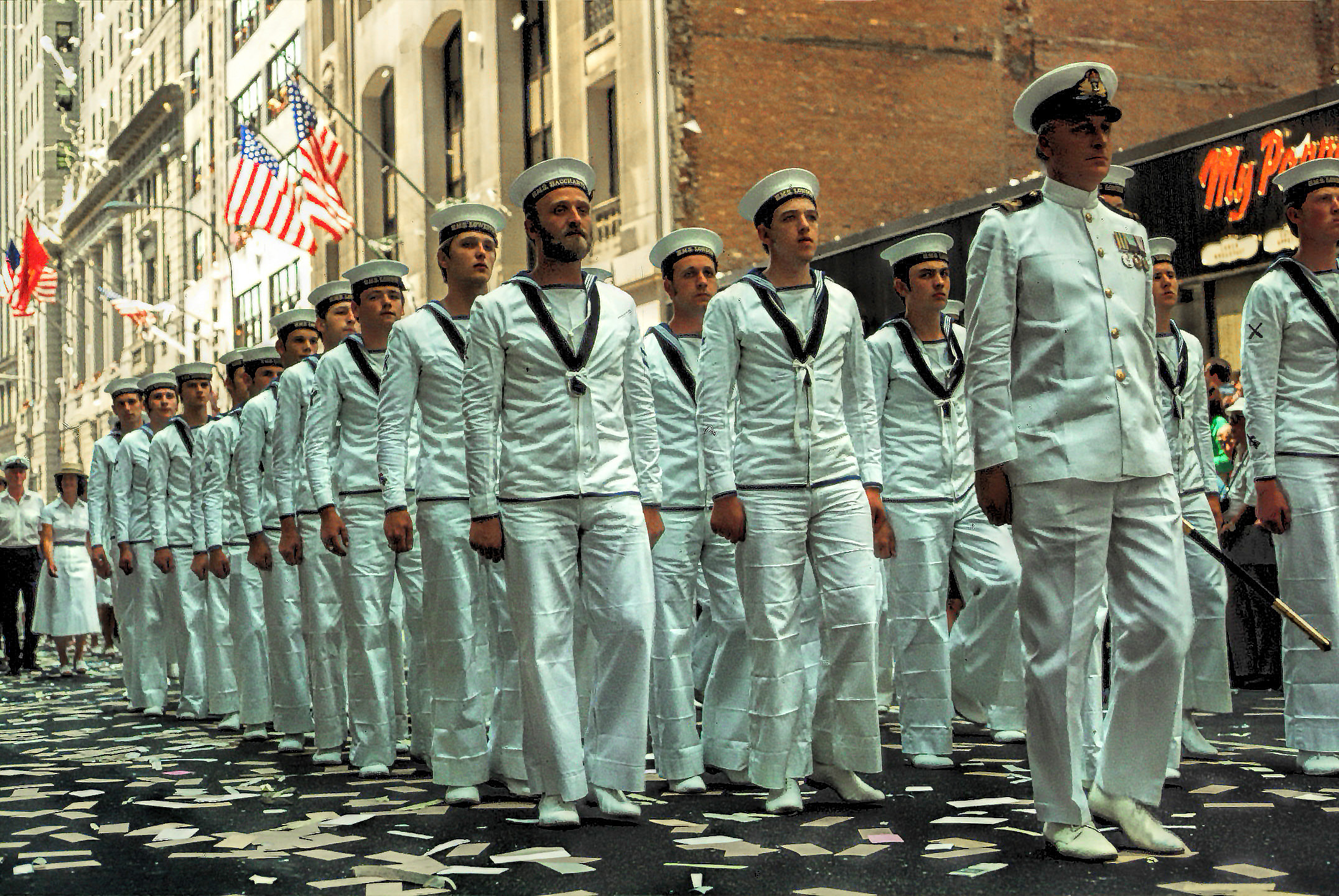
HMS Bacchante and other RN sailors march down Broadway during the Bicentennial celebration

Bacchante was deployed to the Persian Gulf in 1981 conducting the second ever Armilla patrol taking over from Minerva visiting the Somali capital of Mogadishu and the Oman capital of Muscat (often drifting in the Indian Ocean to conserve fuel). In 1982, Bacchante became the Gibraltar Guardship and joined the Birmingham group deploying to the South Atlantic to undertake duties during the Falklands War. Shortly after the war was over the crew was sent ashore to aid the local populace in the disaster recovery operations, providing navigational landmarks for ships located in Stanley Sound and attempting to refloat the high commissioner's barge (but failing); also providing well deserved respite for Royal Marines and navy divers (hot food and accommodation). Whilst trying to erect a navigational radar reflector the team sent ashore, they wandered through a mine field (no injuries received). Some Commanding Officers of note include Julian Oswald and John Brigstocke.

== Royal New Zealand Navy service ==
In 1982 Bacchante was decommissioned from the Royal Navy and subsequently sold to the Royal New Zealand Navy (RNZN). She was renamed Wellington. She decommissioned from the RNZN in 2000.

On decommissioning she was bought from the New Zealand Government for one dollar by the "Sink F69 Trust". On 13 November 2005, after cleaning and the removal of all environmentally unfriendly materials, she was sunk as an artificial reef and dive attraction. She now lies in approximately 25 metres (82 ft) of water about 800 metres (2,600 ft) offshore from Island Bay, a southern suburb of Wellington, the capital city of New Zealand.

== Publications ==
- Colledge, J. J.; Warlow, Ben (2006) [1969]. Ships of the Royal Navy: The Complete Record of All Fighting Ships of the Royal Navy from the 15th Century to the Present (3rd Rev ed.). London: Chatham Publishing. ISBN 978-1-86176-281-8. OCLC 67375475.
- Marriott, Leo, 1983. Royal Navy Frigates 1945-1983, Ian Allan Ltd. ISBN 07110 1322 5
