= Leander-class frigate =

Class of frigate in the Royal Navy

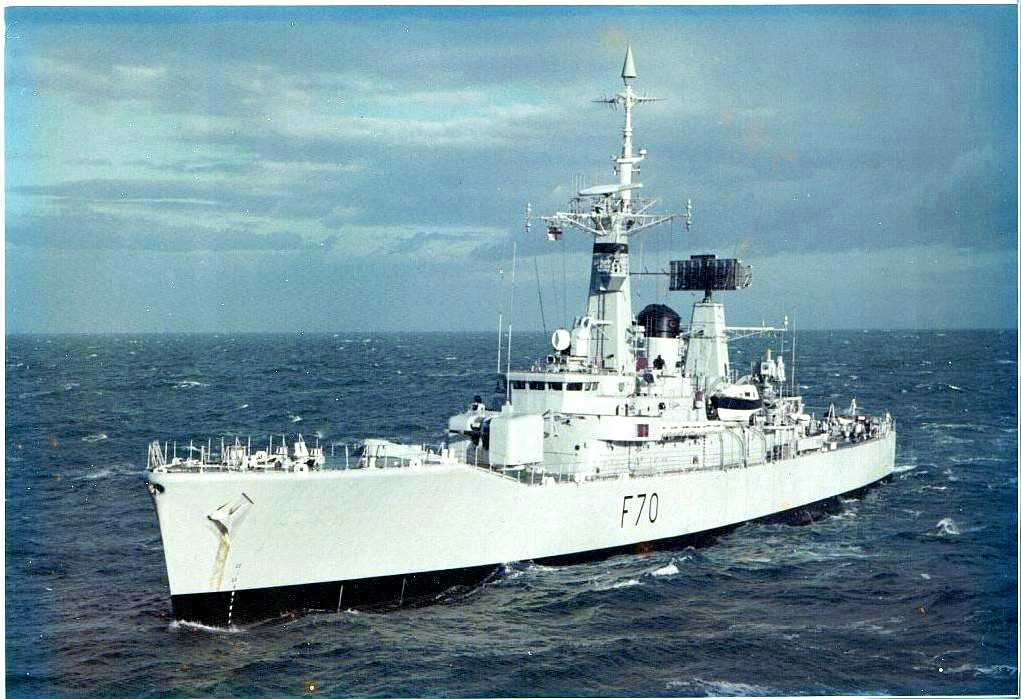
- HMS Apollo, 1976

Class overview
- Name: Leander class
- Operators: Royal Navy; Indian Navy; Royal New Zealand Navy; Chilean Navy; Royal Netherlands Navy; Pakistan Navy; Ecuadorian Navy; Indonesian Navy
- Preceded by: Rothesay class; Salisbury class; Leopard class; Tribal class
- Succeeded by: Type 21 frigate
- Subclasses: Condell class; River class; Nilgiri class; Van Speijk class
- Built: 1959–1973
- In commission: 1963–1993 (Royal Navy)
- Completed: 26
- Retired: 26 (3 as artificial reefs, 2 as targets)

General characteristics
- Type: Frigate
- Displacement: 2,350 tons standard, broad-beam 2,500 tons (later 2,790 tons) standard; 2,860 tons full load, broad-beam 2,962 tons (later 3,300 tons) full load
- Length: 113.4 metres (372 ft)
- Beam: 12.5 metres (41 ft), broad-beamed 13.1 metres (43 ft)
- Draught: 4.5 metres (15 ft) normal, 5.5 metres (18 ft) deep, broad-beamed 5.5 metres (18 ft) (later 5.8 metres (19 ft)) deep
- Propulsion: 2 Babcock & Wilcox oil-fired boilers, geared steam turbines, 22,370 kilowatts (30,000 hp), 2 shafts
- Speed: 27 knots (50 km/h; 31 mph)
- Range: 7,400 kilometres (4,600 mi; 4,000 nmi) at 15 knots (28 km/h; 17 mph)
- Complement: 260
- Sensors & processing systems: Radar: Type 965 (air warning radar removed during the Ikara conversion), Type 992 Q, Type 903, Type 974/978; Sonar: Type 162, 184, 199, & later Type 2031 and Type 2016 sonar; Combat information system: ADAWS-5 (Action Data Automated Weapon System) for Batch 1 - Ikara
- Electronic warfare & decoys: ESM system with UAA-8/9 warning and Type 668/669 jamming elements.
- Armament: Initial: 2 × 4.5-inch guns (1 × twin mounting Mk6); 1 × Seacat surface-to-air missile launcher; 2 × 20mm guns (single mountings); 2 × 40mm Mk VII Bofors (single mountings) initially in first 7 instead of Seacat & 20mm guns; 1 × ASW Limbo mortar; Batch 1 – Ikara: 1 × Ikara Anti-submarine missile Launcher; 2 × Seacat surface-to-air missile launchers; 2 × 40mm guns – single mountings; 2 × triple 324 mm (12.75) STWS-1 tubes for Mk 46 and Stingray ASW torpedoes; 1 × Limbo ASW Mortar; Batch 2 – Exocet/Seacat: 4 × MM.38 Exocet anti-ship missile launchers; 3 × Seacat surface-to-air missile launchers; 2 × 40mm guns – single mountings; 2 × triple 324 mm (12.75 inch) STWS-1 tubes for Mk 46 and Stingray ASW torpedoes; Batch 3 – Exocet/Seawolf: 4 × MM.38 Exocet anti-ship missile launchers; 1 × sextuple GWS.25 launcher with 30 Sea Wolf SAMs; 2 × 20mm AA guns; 2 × triple 324 mm (12.75) STWS-1 tubes for Mk 46 and Stingray ASW torpedoes
- Aircraft carried: Initial and Batch 1: 1 × Westland Wasp ASW helicopter; Batch 2 and Batch 3: 1 × Westland Lynx HAS.Mk 2 ASW helicopter

The Leander-class, or Type 12I (Improved) frigates, comprising twenty-six vessels, was among the most numerous and long-lived classes of frigate in the Royal Navy's modern history. The class was built in three batches between 1959 and 1973. It had an unusually high public profile, due to the popular BBC television drama series Warship. The Leander silhouette became synonymous with the Royal Navy through the 1960s until the 1980s.

The Leander design or derivatives of it were built for other navies:

- Royal New Zealand Navy as the Leander class
- Chilean Navy: Condell class
- Royal Australian Navy: River class
- Indian Navy: Nilgiri class
- Royal Netherlands Navy: Van Speijk class

== Design ==
The policy adopted by the Royal Navy during the 1950s of acquiring separate types of frigates designed for specialised roles (i.e. anti-submarine, anti-aircraft and aircraft direction) had proved unsatisfactory. Although the designs themselves had proved successful, the lack of standardisation between the different classes led to increased costs during construction and also in maintenance once the ships became operational. Furthermore, it was not always possible to have the ships with the required capabilities available for a specific task.

The first move towards creating a truly general-purpose frigate came with the Type 81 Tribal class which was initially ordered in 1956. The 24-knot speed of the Tribals was considered the maximum possible for tracking submarines with the new medium-range sonars, entering service. The type 81 gas turbine saw the frigates underway quickly, without taking hours flashing up steam turbines, and the provision of a helicopter for long-range attack was considered essential in the nuclear age. These ships were mainly intended to operate in the tropics but lacked the speed and armament required for the priority fleet carrier escort role East of Suez, where fast radar picket capability was important, as much as anti-submarine capability. So the new frigates would combine the roles of the T12 and T61. The fully air-conditioned Royal New Zealand Navy Rothesay class variant, HMNZS Otago, which gave all the crew a bunk and cafeteria messing and a RNZN commissioned design study for a more fully capable Type 12 frigate, which also assessed whether the Type 12 could carry 2 of the larger Wessex AS helicopters, was used as the basis of the RN Leander Improved Type 12 design.

On 7 March 1960, the Civil Lord of the Admiralty C. Ian Orr-Ewing stated that the "Type 12 Whitby-class anti-submarine frigates are proving particularly successful ... and we have decided to exploit their good qualities in an improved and more versatile ship. This improved Type 12 will be known as the Leander class. The hull and steam turbine machinery will be substantially the same as for the Whitbys. The main new features planned are a long-range air warning radar, the Seacat anti-aircraft guided missile, improved anti-submarine detection equipment and a light-weight helicopter armed with homing torpedoes. We shall also introduce air conditioning and better living conditions." The 1963 edition of Jane's Fighting Ships described it as a "mainly anti-submarine but flexible and all-purpose type".

The Leander class have the same hull and substantially the same steam turbine machinery as the Whitby class, but are a revised and advanced design and will fulfil a composite anti-submarine, anti-aircraft and air direction role. The 40mm guns will eventually be replaced by Seacat ship-to-air launchers. The ships are equipped with VDS (Variable Depth Sonar), formerly known as dipping asdic.

— Jane's Fighting Ships,

The difference between the Leanders (Type 12I) and the Whitbys (Type 12) was most obviously that the stepped quarterdeck of the Type 12 had been done away with, resulting in a flush deck, with the exception of the raised forecastle. The superstructure had been combined into a single block amidships and a new bridge design gave improved visibility. A hangar and flight deck were provided aft for the Westland Wasp light anti-submarine helicopter, which was still at the prototype stage when the first ships were ordered. The ship was air conditioned throughout and there were no portholes in order to improve nuclear, biological and chemical defence. The ships were all given names which had previously been given to Royal Navy cruisers, mostly of characters from classical mythology, the exceptions being Cleopatra and Sirius.

The Y160 boiler variant used on the Batch 3 Leanders (such as Jupiter) also incorporated steam atomisation equipment on the fuel supply so the diesel fuel entering the boilers via the three main burners was atomised into a fine spray for better flame efficiency. Some ships with Y100 Boilers were also converted to steam atomisation, HMS Cleopatra being one of them. The superheat temperature of the Y160 was controlled manually by the boiler room petty officer of the watch between 750–850 °F (399–454 °C) and the steam supplied to the main turbines was at a pressure of 550 psi (3,800 kPa). The Leander-class frigates did have Babcock & Wilcox boilers but of a more conventional two-drum design, one water drum and one steam drum, much like a Yarrow boiler without the second water drum. The water drum was offset to one side and below the furnace and steam drum. The two boilers fitted were 'handed' with the water drum inboard on both. Many Leanders had six-burner furnaces (known as Five and a Half Boilers) and the output was varied by altering the number of burners in use.

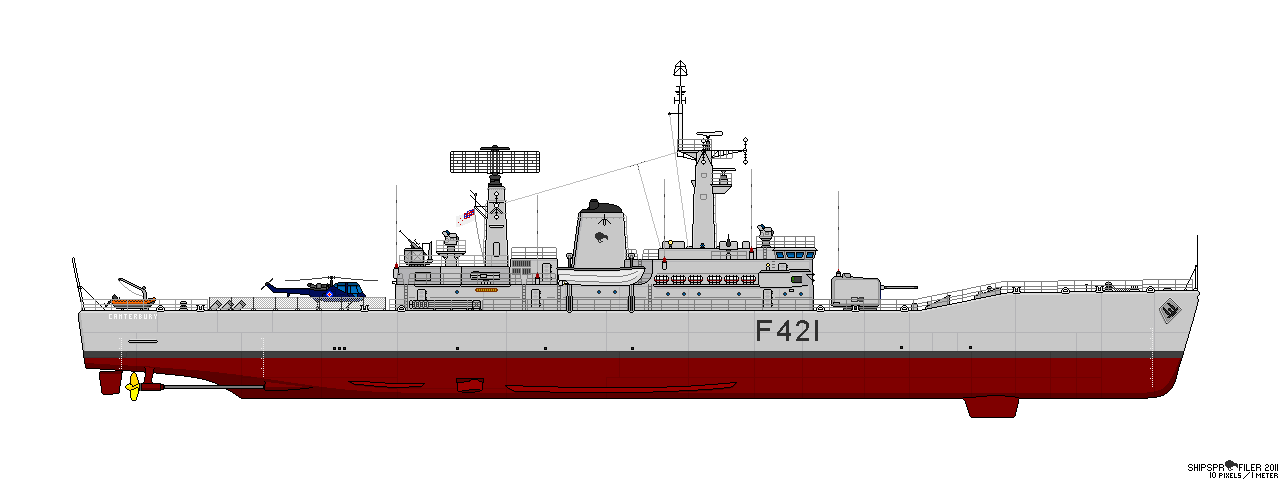
Profile of HMNZS Canterbury as she appeared at the time of commissioning. Note the 40 mm Bofors guns in place of Seacat missiles.

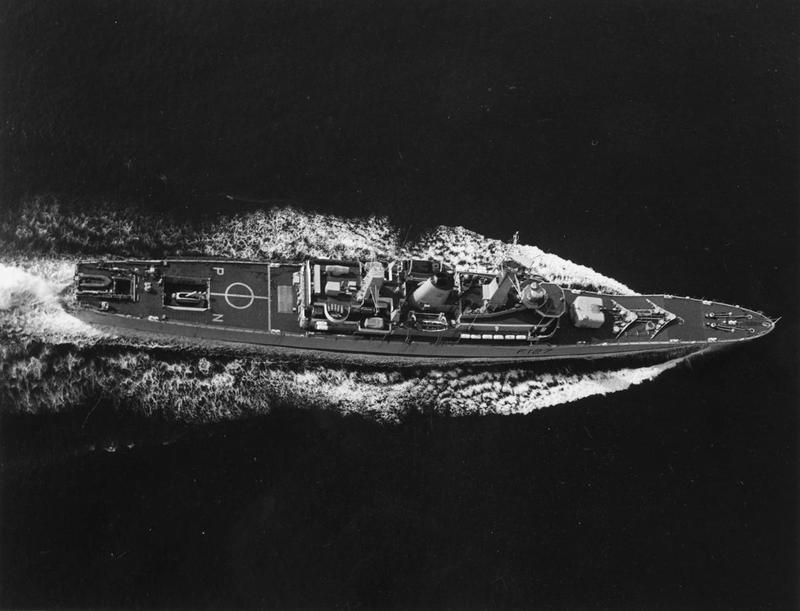
Aerial view of HMS Penelope in 1970, showing the original layout of the class before conversion

== Construction programme ==
Royal Navy
| Pennant | Name | (a) Hull builder (b) Main machinery manufacturers | Laid down | Launched | Accepted into service | Commissioned | Estimated building cost | Conversion group |
Batch 1 Leander Y-100 machinery
| F109 | Leander | (a) & (b) Harland & Wolff Ltd, Belfast. | 10 April 1959 | 28 June 1961 | March 1963 | 27 March 1963 | £4,630,000 | Ikara |
| F104 | Dido | (a) & (b) Yarrow & Co Ltd, Glasgow. | 2 December 1959 | 22 December 1961 | September 1963 | 18 September 1963 | £4,600,000 | Ikara |
| F127 | Penelope | (a) Vickers-Armstrongs (Shipbuilders) Ltd, Newcastle (b) Vickers-Armstrongs (Engineers) Ltd, Barrow-in-Furness | 14 March 1961 | 17 August 1962 | November 1963 | 31 October 1963 | £4,600,000 | Exocet/Seacat |
| F114 | Ajax | (a) & (b) Cammell Laird & Co (Shipbuilders and Engineers) Ltd, Birkenhead. | 19 October 1959 | 16 August 1962 | December 1963 | 10 December 1963 | £4,800,000 | Ikara |
| F10 | Aurora | (a) & (b) John Brown & Co Ltd, Clydebank | 1 June 1961 | 28 November 1962 | April 1964 | 9 April 1964 | £4,650,000 | Ikara |
| F18 | Galatea | (a) Swan, Hunter & Wigham Richardson Ltd, Wallsend-on-Tyne (b) The Wallsend Slipway & Engineering Co Ltd, Wallsend-on-Tyne (steam turbines) (b) Parsons Marine Turbines Co Ltd, Wallsend-on-Tyne (gearing). | 29 December 1961 | 23 May 1963 | April 1964 | 25 April 1964 | £4,500,000 | Ikara |
| F15 | Euryalus | (a) Scotts Shipbuilding & Engineering Co Ltd, Greenock (b) Scotts Shipbuilding & Engineering Co Ltd (steam turbines) (b) Fairfield Shipbuilding & Engineering Co Ltd, Glasgow (gearing). | 2 November 1961 | 6 June 1963 | September 1964 | 16 September 1964 | £4,350,000 | Ikara |
| F39 | Naiad | (a) Yarrow & Co Ltd, Glasgow (b) Yarrow & Co Ltd, Glasgow (steam turbines) (b) Parsons Marine Turbines Co Ltd, Wallsend-on-Tyne (gearing). | 30 October 1962 | 4 November 1963 | March 1965 | 15 March 1965 | £4,750,000 | Ikara |
| F38 | Arethusa | (a) JS White & Co Ltd, Cowes, Isle of Wight (b) JS White & Co Ltd, Cowes, Isle of Wight (steam turbines) (b) Parsons Marine Turbines Co Ltd, Wallsend-on-Tyne (gearing). | 7 September 1962 | 5 November 1963 | November 1965 | 24 November 1965 | £4,850,000 | Ikara (Note: Subsequently fitted with Type 2031 towed array sonar) |
| F28 | Cleopatra | (a) HM Dockyard, Devonport (b) Cammell Laird & Co (Shipbuilders & Engineers) Ltd, Birkenhead (turbines) (b) John Brown & Co Ltd, Clydebank (gearing). | 19 June 1963 | 25 March 1964 | February 1966 | 4 January 1966 | £5,300,000 | Exocet/Seacat |
Batch 2 Leander Y-136 machinery
| F42 | Phoebe | (a) Alexander Stephen & Sons Ltd, Linthouse, Glasgow (b) Alexander Stephen & Sons Ltd, Linthouse, Glasgow (steam turbines) (b) David Brown & Co Ltd, Huddersfield (gearing). | 3 June 1963 | 8 July 1964 | April 1966 | 15 April 1966 | £4,750,000 | Exocet/Seacat |
| F45 | Minerva | (a) Vickers Ltd, Shipbuilding Group, Newcastle (b) Alexander Stephen & Sons Ltd, Linthouse, Glasgow (steam turbines) (b) David Brown & Co Ltd, Huddersfield (gearing). | 26 July 1963 | 19 December 1964 | May 1966 | 14 May 1966 | £4,700,000 | Exocet/Seacat |
| F40 | Sirius | (a) HM Dockyard, Portsmouth (b) JS White & Co Ltd, Cowes, Isle of Wight (turbines) (b) David Brown & Co Ltd, Huddersfield (gearing). | 9 August 1963 | 22 September 1964 | June 1966 | 15 June 1966 | £5,600,000 | Exocet/Seacat |
| F52 | Juno | (a) JI Thornycroft Ltd, Southampton (b) JI Thornycroft Ltd, Southampton (steam turbines) (b) David Brown & Co Ltd, Huddersfield (gearing) | 16 July 1964 | 24 November 1965 | July 1967 | 18 July 1967 | £5,020,000 | Training |
| F56 | Argonaut | (a) Hawthorn Leslie, Hebburn (b) JS White & Co Ltd, Cowes, Isle of Wight (steam turbines) (b) David Brown & Co Ltd, Huddersfield (gearing). | 27 November 1964 | 8 February 1966 | September 1967 | 17 August 1967 | £5,000,000 | Exocet/Seacat |
| F47 | Danae | (a) HM Dockyard, Devonport (b) JS White & Co Ltd, Cowes, Isle of Wight (steam turbines) (b) Fairfields (Glasgow) Ltd (gearing). | 16 December 1964 | 31 October 1965 | October 1967 | 7 September 1967 | £5,720,000 | Exocet/Seacat |
Broad-beamed Leander Y-160 machinery
| F75 | Charybdis | (a) Harland & Wolff Ltd, Belfast (b) Vickers Ltd, Engineering Group, Barrow-in-Furness. | 27 January 1967 | 28 February 1968 | June 1969 | 2 June 1969 | £6,330,000 | Exocet/Seawolf |
| F58 | Hermione | (a) Yarrow & Co Ltd, Glasgow (b) Alex Stephen & Sons Ltd, Linthouse, Glasgow (steam turbines) (b) Vickers Ltd, Engineering Group, Barrow-in-Furness (gearing). | 6 December 1965 | 26 April 1967 | July 1969 | 11 July 1969 | £6,400,000 | Exocet/Seawolf |
| F60 | Jupiter | (a) Yarrow & Co Ltd, Glasgow (b) JS White & Co Ltd, Cowes, Isle of Wight (steam turbines) (b) Vickers Ltd, Engineering Group, Barrow-in-Furness (gearing). | 3 October 1966 | 4 September 1967 | August 1969 | 9 August 1969 | £6,100,000 | Exocet/Seawolf |
| F69 | Bacchante | (a) Vickers Ltd, Shipbuilding Group, Newcastle (b) JS White & Co Ltd, Cowes, Isle of Wight (steam turbines) (b) Vickers Ltd, Engineering Group, Barrow-in-Furness (gearing). | 27 October 1966 | 29 February 1968 | October 1969 | 17 October 1969 | £6,200,000 | Gun |
| F57 | Andromeda | (a) HM Dockyard, Portsmouth (b) JS White & Co Ltd, Cowes, Isle of Wight (steam turbines) (b) David Brown & Co Ltd, Huddersfield (gearing). | 25 May 1966 | 24 May 1967 | December 1969 | 2 December 1968 | £6,700,000 | Exocet/Seawolf |
| F71 | Scylla | (a) HM Dockyard, Devonport (b) JS White & Co Ltd (turbines) (b) David Brown & Co Ltd (gearing). | 17 May 1967 | 8 August 1968 | February 1970 | 12 February 1970 | £6,600,000 | Exocet/Seawolf |
| F12 | Achilles | (a) Yarrow & Co Ltd, Glasgow (b) JS White & Co Ltd (turbines) (b) David Brown & Co Ltd (gearing). | 1 December 1967 | 21 November 1968 | July 1970 | 9 July 1970 | £6,270,000 | Gun |
| F16 | Diomede | (a) Yarrow & Co Ltd, Glasgow (b) JS White & Co Ltd (turbines) (b) David Brown & Co Ltd (gearing). | 30 January 1968 | 15 April 1969 | April 1971 | 2 April 1971 | £5,980,000 | Gun |
| F70 | Apollo | (a) Yarrow & Co Ltd, Glasgow (b) JS White & Co Ltd (turbines) (b) David Brown & Co Ltd (gearing). | 1 May 1969 | 15 October 1970 | 10 June 1972 | 28 May 1972 | £6,573,000 | Gun |
| F72 | Ariadne | (a) Yarrow & Co Ltd, Glasgow (b) JS White & Co Ltd (turbines) (b) David Brown & Co Ltd (gearing). | 1 November 1969 | 10 September 1971 | 10 February 1973 | 10 February 1973 | £6,576,000 | Gun |
Royal New Zealand Navy
| Pennant | Name | Builder | Laid down | Launched | Commissioned | | Type | |
| F55 | Waikato | Harland and Wolff, Belfast | 10 January 1964 | 18 February 1965 | 19 September 1966 | | Batch 2 Towed Array | |
| F421 | Canterbury | Yarrow Shipbuilders, Glasgow | 12 June 1969 | 6 May 1970 | 22 October 1971 | | Broad beam | |

== Midlife major refits ==
The entire class were designed for a standard weapons fit when built, with a twin 4.5-inch Mark 6 gun mount, GWS-22 Seacat missile system and Limbo anti-submarine mortar, though the first seven entered service fitted with two single 40 mm Bofors guns on the hangar roof instead of Seacat, with the SAM system fitted later. All but one of the ships had Seacat GWS-22; the exception was Naiad, which had Seacat GWS-20. However, advances in weapons systems led to a number of different conversions being undertaken on various members of the class. This saw the class grouped into four broad batches:

- Ikara – installation of the Ikara ASW missile system in place of the 4.5-inch gun mount, plus an additional Seacat missile system.
- Exocet/Seacat – installation of Exocet anti-ship missile system in place of 4.5-inch gun mount, plus two additional Seacat missile systems.
- Exocet/Seawolf – installation of Exocet anti-ship missile system in place of 4.5-inch gun mount; replacement of Seacat with single GWS-25 Seawolf surface-to-air missile system.
- Gun – retained 4.5-inch gun mount and Seacat missile system.

=== Batch 1, Ikara conversion ===
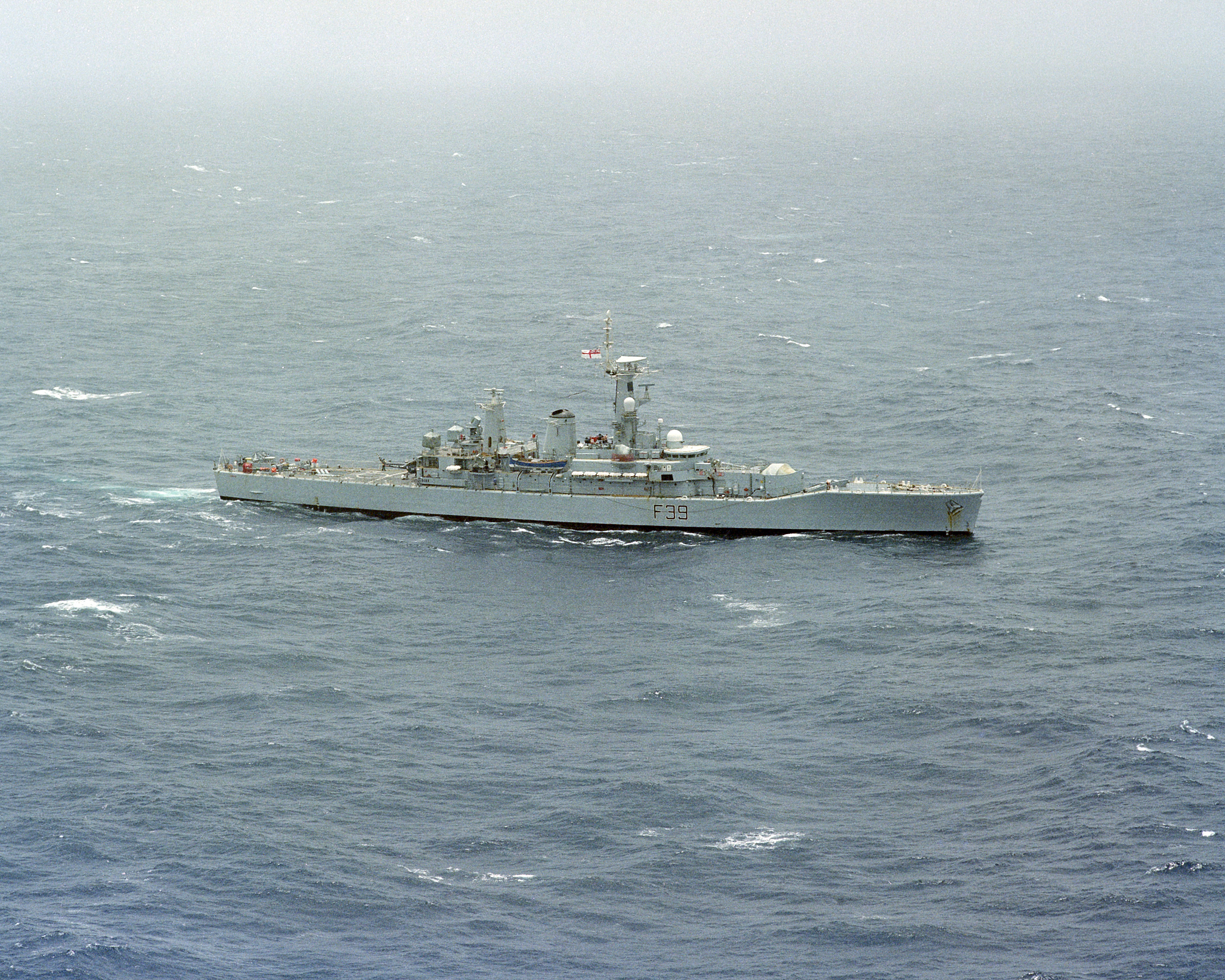
Naiad, an Ikara conversion in 1982

Eight of the first ten Leanders were given the so-called "Batch 1" or "Ikara" conversion, which saw the Ikara anti-submarine warfare missile installed in place of the 4.5-inch gun, plus an additional Seacat system, and the removal of the Type 965 radar and its AKE(1) aerial. The internal space previously used by the Type 965 was used for the ADAWS needed for Ikara.

Ikara conversion
| Pennant | Name | Place undertaken | Started | Completed | Cost |
Batch 1A
| F109 | Leander | Devonport | 8 June 1970 | 12 January 1973 | £7,587,000 |
| F114 | Ajax | Devonport | 19 October 1970 | 7 February 1974 | £8,269,000 |
| F18 | Galatea | Devonport | 4 October 1971 | 6 September 1974 | £9,217,000 |
Batch 1B
| F10 | Aurora | Chatham | 4 December 1974 | 27 February 1976 | £15,580,000 |
| F39 | Naiad | Devonport | 15 January 1973 | 20 June 1975 | £10,410,000 |
| F15 | Euryalus | Devonport | 7 May 1973 | 12 March 1976 | £12,127,000 |
| F38 | Arethusa | Portsmouth | 10 September 1973 | 7 April 1977 | £16,585,000 |
| F104 | Dido | Devonport | 7 July 1975 | 27 October 1978 | £23,006,000 |

=== Batch 2, Seacat/Exocet conversion ===
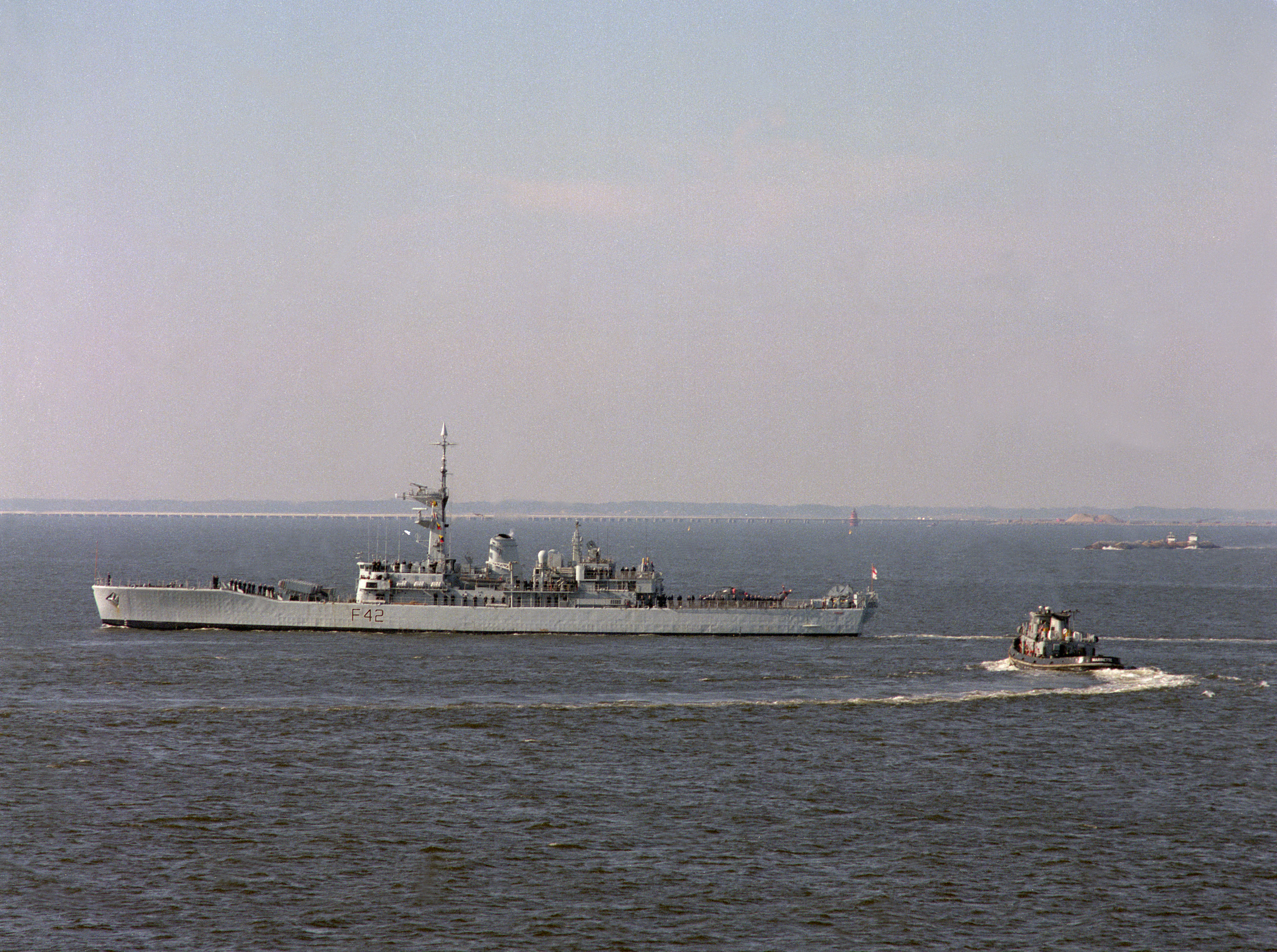
Phoebe, an Exocet conversion, in 1990

Two of the Leanders with Y-100 machinery, and five out of the six with Y-136 machinery, were given the so-called "Batch 2" or "Exocet" conversion. This conversion gave them Exocet anti-shipping missiles in place of the 4.5-inch gun mount, 2 additional Seacat systems, and the ability to operate the Lynx helicopter.

Exocet / Seacat conversion
| Pennant | Name | Commissioned | Place undertaken | Started | Completed | Cost ("Outturn") |
Batch 2A
| F28 | Cleopatra | 4 January 1966 | Devonport | 23 July 1973 | 19 December 1975 | £13,820,000 |
| F42 | Phoebe | 15 April 1966 | Devonport | 5 August 1974 | 28 April 1977 | £18,204,000 |
| F40 | Sirius | 15 June 1966 | Devonport | 10 March 1975 | 10 February 1978 | £21,598,000 |
| F45 | Minerva | 14 May 1966 | Chatham | 1 December 1975 | 11 April 1979 | £31,575,000 |
Batch 2B
| F56 | Argonaut | 17 August 1967 | Devonport | 23 February 1976 | 28 March 1980 | £30,262,000 |
| F47 | Danae | 7 September 1967 | Devonport | 1 August 1977 | 8 April 1981 | £39,279,000 |
| F127 | Penelope | 31 October 1963 | Devonport | June 1978 | 15 January 1982 | £47,687,000 |
| F52 | Juno | 18 July 1967 | Exocet conversion cancelled. | | | |

=== Batch 2, navigational training ship conversion ===
Juno, commissioned 18 July 1967, was converted to serve as a navigational training ship. Work at Rosyth began in January 1982 and completed in February 1985. This conversion involved the removal of the Type 965 radar and all of her armament. The flight deck was extended by plating over the mortar well; the STWS 1 torpedo system and two 20 mm guns were installed. Juno replaced HMS Torquay in the training role, as well as serving as the trials ship for the Type 2050 sonar.

=== Batch 3, Seawolf/Exocet conversion ===
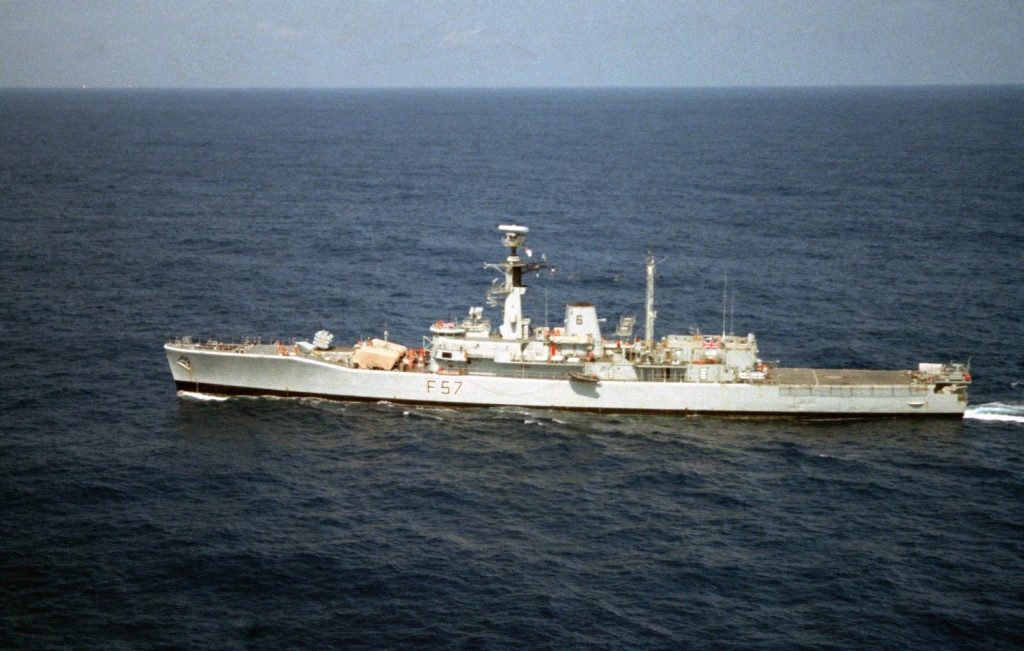
Andromeda, a Seawolf conversion, in 1990

The Seawolf conversion gave the broad-beamed Leanders Exocet anti-shipping missiles in place of the 4.5-inch mounting, a Seawolf missile system in place of Seacat, Sonar 2016, and the ability to operate the Lynx helicopter. All the radar systems were removed and replaced by Type 967, 968, 975 and 910 radars. Only five of the broad-beamed Leanders were converted to carry Seawolf due to costs (£70 million for each refit) and, as a lesser consideration, to retain some ships capable of naval gunfire support.

Exocet / Seawolf conversion
| Pennant | Ship | Commissioned | Place undertaken | Started | Planned completion | Actual completion | Cost |
Batch 3A
| F57 | Andromeda | 2 December 1968 | Devonport | 3 January 1978 | | 6 February 1981 | £59,990,000 |
| F75 | Charybdis | 2 June 1969 | Devonport | 25 June 1979 | June 1982 | 16 July 1982 | £61,581,000 |
| F60 | Jupiter | 9 August 1969 | Devonport | 28 January 1980 | July 1983 | 14 October 1983 | †£68,348,000 |
| F58 | Hermione | 11 July 1969 | Chatham/Devonport | 14 January 1980 | January 1983 | 8 December 1983 | †£79,692,000 |
| F71 | Scylla | 12 February 1970 | Devonport | 10 November 1980 | September 1983 | December 1984 | †£79,278,000 |

† = Latest estimate as at 14 December 1983.

=== Batch 2 TA & Batch 1B – towed array conversions ===
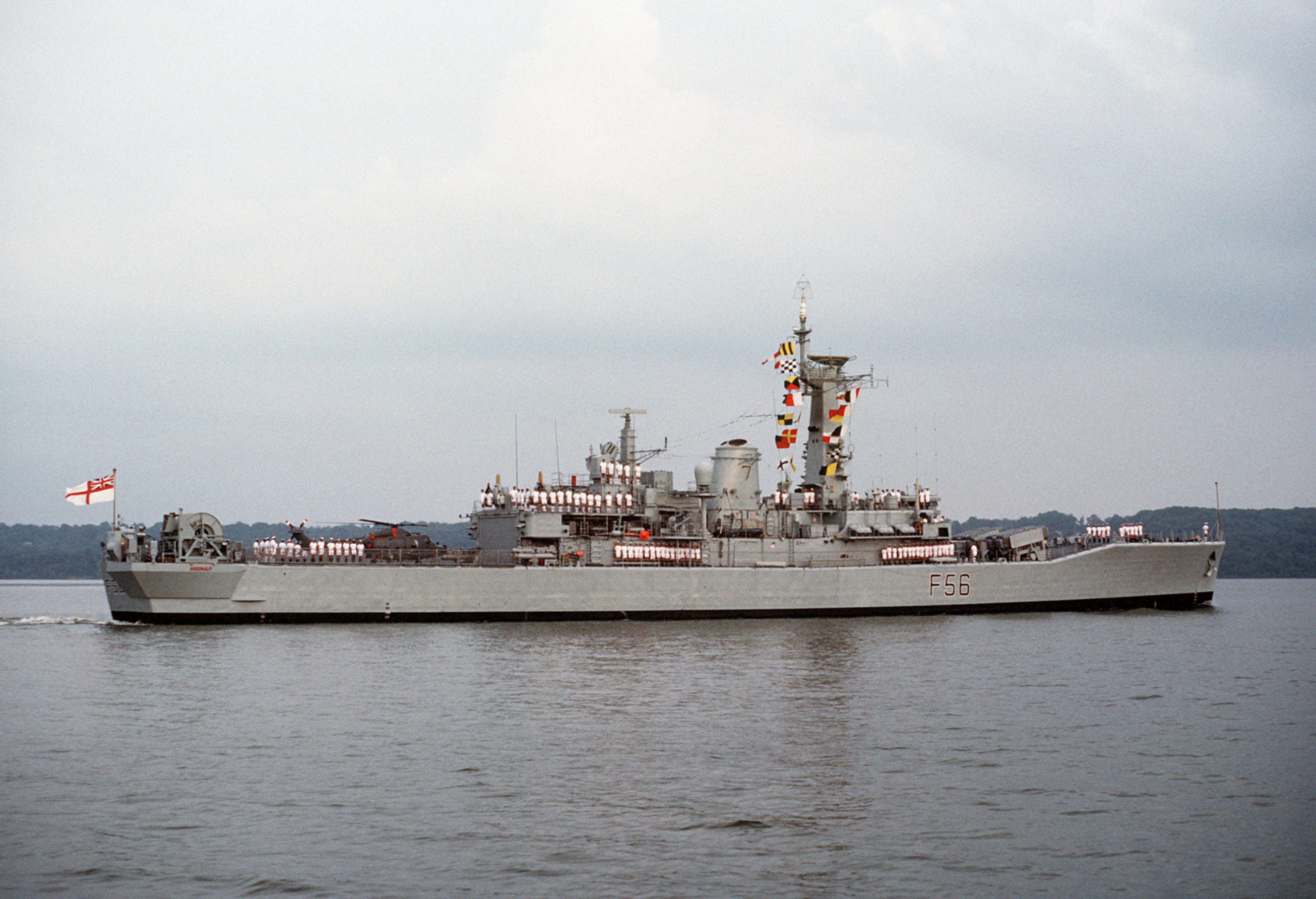
Argonaut, a batch 2 Exocet conversion fitted with a towed array, in 1985. Note the platform at the stern added in the towed array conversion in 1982–1983.

In 1981 the Admiralty said that they intended to devote "substantial resources to improving the effectiveness of the sensors and anti-submarine weapons ... This includes the new passive towed array system that we hope to introduce into service next year."

HMS Matapan and HMS Lowestoft were used for testing prototypes in 1978–1981. It was planned to install them on Rothesay conversions, but this was not possible due to industrial strikes. Scheduling then made it easier to fit them onboard four of the Batch II Leanders. "Compensation for the additional 70 tons of top weight included lowering the Exocet launchers. This interesting quartet was to have been followed by five Batch III Leanders, but the latter fell foul of the Nott cancellations. A fifth Leander, the Ikara-carrying HMS Arethusa, was fitted with a towed array in 1985, the year the towed-array trials ship Lowestoft was withdrawn from service."

Admiral Sir Julian Oswald said to the Defence Committee in 1989, "in order to capitalise on the really very exciting and important development of towed arrays, we had to get them to sea as soon as we could. The only sensible, cost-effective option open to us was to take some relatively older ships – the Leanders – and convert them quickly to the towed array. We have done that with great success, and the peacetime patrols have achieved some remarkable results, but there has been a price to pay because of the age of those ships."

In general, "as a ship gets older it tends to get noisier – the hull and also the propulsion system". At the same Defence Committee meeting, Oswald spoke "to counter the presumption that older ships get noisier. That is not necessarily true and it is not true, in my experience, in the case of the Leanders because understanding of ship-generated noise is improving all the time and our techniques for countering it are improving – our noise monitoring and so on – so, despite the fact that these ships are getting older, they are in many cases managing to improve their performance with regard to ship noise." Captain Geoffrey Biggs said "the Leanders are remarkably quiet in operation and our experience has been that they have made excellent towed-array platforms despite the rather short notice of actually getting the towed-array programme together to start with. They actually perform very well."

Five ships were converted to use Waverley Type 2031(I) towed array (passive search very low frequency). They were as follows:

Refit when towed array fitted
| Pennant | Name | Commissioned | Started | Completed |
Batch 2A Exocet Leander (Batch 2TA)
| F42 | Phoebe | 15 April 1966 | February 1981 | July 1982 |
| F28 | Cleopatra | 4 January 1966 | January 1982 | April 1983 |
| F56 | Argonaut | 17 August 1967 | August 1982 | November 1983 |
| F40 | Sirius | 15 June 1966 | April 1985 | December 1985 |
Batch 1B Ikara Leander
| F38 | Arethusa | 24 November 1965 | May 1985 | February 1986 |

== Royal Navy service ==
During their lengthy service with the Royal Navy Leanders were employed during the Indonesia–Malaysia confrontation in 1963–1966. The 1973 and 1975–1976 Cod Wars in the latter of which HMS Diomede suffered severe damage with a 30 feet gash in its hull after being rammed by an Icelandic Coast Guard gunboat. The frigates with their thin hulls being much less suited to this duty than the later offshore patrol vessels.

Four members of the class saw action during the 1982 Falklands War, three Batch Two conversions, HMS Argonaut, HMS Minerva and HMS Penelope Argonaut experienced 15 air attacks in San Carlos Sound and was hit by a number of bombs and cannon fire; it was stranded for six days, with two bombs lodged in the forward Seacat magazine and boiler room. The first Seawolf conversion HMS Andromeda, was one of only three Seawolf fitted frigates available with the Royal Navy's newest missile in the war and served during the war as the critical "goalkeeper"- the last line of defence for the carrier HMS Invincible during the war. The five unconverted, gun-armed, broad-beam Leanders, arrived in the war zone in the last week of the conflict and immediately after it to serve with the post-war task force led by the brand new carrier HMS Illustrious. An Argentine naval dive team planned to place limpet mines on HMS Ariadne at Gibraltar during the conflict (Operation Algeciras). The last Leander commissioned in 1973, like the two built for Chile, carried special electronic warfare systems, for countering Exocet missiles, and the Argentine services may have anticipated the Ariadne was scheduled for service in the Total Exclusion Zone, which in fact did not happen until after the end of the war.

The ships performed excellently in Royal Navy service, with relatively low noise levels giving the 2031(I) towed sonar a range of more than 100 miles, better than that of the more advanced 2031(Z) sonar when fitted in the Type 22 frigates. However, all Leanders in Royal Navy service were decommissioned by the early 1990s due to the ships' ageing design and the high number of crew. Scylla was sunk on 27 March 2004 as an artificial reef off Cornwall, eleven years after her decommissioning in 1993.

=== Running costs ===
| Period | Running cost | What is included |
|---|---|---|
| 1972–1973 | £250,000 | Average annual maintenance cost per vessel |
| 1980–1981 | £6 million | Average current cost for a "normal refit". |
| 1981–1982 | £6.8 million | "at average 1981–1982 prices and including associated aircraft costs but excluding the costs of major refits." |
| 1985–1986 | £6.5 million | "the average cost of running and maintaining a Leander-class frigate for one year". |
| 1987–1988 | £3.8 million | "average annual operating costs, at financial year 1987–88 prices"..."These costs include personnel, fuel, spares and so on, and administrative support services, but exclude new construction, capital equipment, and refit-repair costs". |

== Overseas service ==
Leander-class frigates were also successfully exported to serve in the Royal New Zealand Navy and Chilean Navy; in the latter they were designated as the Condell class. Further frigates were modelled on the Leander-class frigates and were built under licence in Australia as the River class for the Royal Australian Navy, India as the Nilgiri class and the Netherlands as the Van Speijk class. Royal Navy ships were sold to the navies of Chile, Ecuador, New Zealand (Bacchante becoming HMNZS Wellington and Dido becoming HMNZS Southland), India and Pakistan.

Starting in 1986, the six Van Speijk-class ships were sold to the Indonesian Navy and renamed the Ahmad Yani class, five of which are still in service. (Note: KRI Slamet Riyadi was decommissioned on 16 August 2019.) Pakistan decommissioned the last of its Leander-class frigates, Zulfiqar, in January 2007, India decommissioned her last Leander class on 24 May 2012.

HMNZS Canterbury, the last steam-turbine driven Leander-class frigate in the Royal New Zealand Navy, was decommissioned in Auckland on 31 March 2005 after 33 years operational service. In 2006 it was announced that the ship was to be sunk as a dive attraction in the Bay of Islands, and this was carried out on 3 November 2007 at Deep Water Cove. She lies near her sister ship HMNZS Waikato.

== Fate ==
Royal Navy

| Pennant | Name | Commissioned | Fate |
Batch 1 (Ikara conversion)
| F109 | Leander | 27 March 1963 | Sunk as target 1989 |
| F104 | Dido | 18 September 1963 | To New Zealand as HMNZS Southland 1983, paid off 1995 and sold for scrap. Towed to the Philippines to have her boilers removed for use on a rubber plantation and then towed to Goa Beach, India, for scrapping. |
| F114 | Ajax | 10 December 1963 | Scrapped 1988 |
| F10 | Aurora | 9 April 1964 | Scrapped 1990 |
| F18 | Galatea | 25 April 1964 | Sunk as target 1988 |
| F15 | Euryalus | 16 September 1964 | Sold for scrap 1990 |
| F39 | Naiad | 15 March 1965 | Sunk as target 1990 |
| F38 | Arethusa | 24 November 1965 | Sunk as target 1991 |
Batch 2 (Exocet conversion)
| F127 | Penelope | 31 October 1963 | To Ecuador 1991 as Presidente Eloy Alfaro. Decommissioned 2008 and subsequently scrapped. |
| F28 | Cleopatra | 4 January 1966 | Sold for scrap 1993 |
| F42 | Phoebe | 15 April 1966 | Sold for scrap 1992 |
| F45 | Minerva | 14 May 1966 | Decommissioned. March 1992. Sold for scrap 1993 |
| F40 | Sirius | 15 June 1966 | Decommissioned 27 February 1993. Sunk as target 1998 |
| F56 | Argonaut | 17 August 1967 | Sold for scrap 1995 |
| F47 | Danae | 7 September 1967 | To Ecuador 1991 as Morán Valverde. She was decommissioned in 2008, and put up for sale in December 2009 and scrapped 2010/11 in Andec Dock, Ecuador. |
Batch 2
| F52 | Juno | 18 July 1967 | Sold for scrap 1994 |
Batch 3A / broad-beamed Leander (Sea Wolf conversion)
| F75 | Charybdis | 2 June 1969 | Sunk as target 1993 |
| F58 | Hermione | 11 July 1969 | Decommissioned 30 June 1992. Sold for scrap 1997 |
| F60 | Jupiter | 9 August 1969 | Sold for scrap 1997 |
| F57 | Andromeda | 2 December 1968 | To India 1995 as training ship, Krishna. Decommissioned 24 May 2012. |
| F71 | Scylla | 12 February 1970 | Sunk as artificial reef off Whitsand Bay 2004 |
Batch 3B / broad-beamed Leander
| F69 | Bacchante | 17 October 1969 | To New Zealand 1982 as Wellington, sunk as artificial reef in Wellington Harbour 2005 |
| F12 | Achilles | 9 July 1970 | To Chile 1990 as Ministro Zenteno, in reserve from 2006. Washed out to sea by a tsunami and scuttled, 2010 |
| F16 | Diomede | 2 April 1971 | To Pakistan 1988 as Shamsher, retired pre-2007 to salvage spare parts for Zulfiqar. |
| F70 | Apollo | 28 May 1972 | To Pakistan 1988 as Zulfiquar, retired from Pakistani service 4 January 2007. Sunk as target 12 March 2010 |
| F72 | Ariadne | 10 February 1973 | To Chile 1992 as General Baquedano, sunk as target 2004 |

== See also ==
- List of frigate classes by country
- Whitby-class frigate, the original Type 12 frigate.
- Rothesay-class frigate, the follow-on Type 12M frigate.
- Warship, a BBC television drama series.

Equivalent frigates of the same era

- Garcia class
- Oslo class
- Köln class
- Bronstein class
- João Belo class
- Commandant Rivière class
- Tribal class

== Notes ==
| Leander | Dec 1972 (Marriott) | Jan 1973 (Hansard) |
| Ajax | Sep 1973 (Marriott) | Feb 1974 (Hansard) |
| Aurora | Mar 1976 (Marriott) | Feb 1976 (Hansard) |
| Naiad | Jul 1975 (Marriott) | Jun 1975 (Hansard) |

| Danae | £5,720,000 (Defence Estimates) | £5,830,000 (Hansard 26 March 1969) |
| Juno | £5,020,000 (Defence Estimates) | £5,000,000 (Hansard 26 March 1969) |
| Argonaut | £5,000,000 (Defence Estimates) | £5,000,000 (Hansard 26 March 1969) |

| Cleopatra | Nov 1975 (Marriott) | Dec 1975 (Hansard 6 July 1981) |
| Sirius | Oct 1977 (Marriott) | Feb 1978 (Hansard 6 July 1981) |
| Minerva | Mar 1979 (Marriott) | Apr 1979 (Hansard 6 July 1981) |
| Danae | Sep 1980 (Marriott) | Apr 1981 (Hansard 6 July 1981) |
| Penelope | Mar 1981 (Marriott) | 15 January 1982 (Hansard 14 December 1983) |

| Andromeda | December 1980 (Marriott) | February 1981 (Hansard 6 July 1981) |
| Charybdis | August 1982 (Marriott) | 16 July 1982 (Hansard 14 December 1983) |
| Hermione | June 1983 (Marriott) | 8 December 1983 (Hansard 14 December 1983) |

== Bibliography ==
- Allanway, Jim (1995) Leander Class Frigates, H M Stationery Office, ISBN 978-0117724587
- Colledge, J J; Warlow, Ben (2010). Ships Of The Royal Navy: A Complete Record of all Fighting Ships of the Royal Navy from the 15th Century to the Present. Casemate. ISBN 978-1935149071.
- Jackson, Robert (2006) The Encyclopedia of Warships, From World War Two to the Present Day, Grange Books Ltd, ISBN 978-1840139099
- Marriott, Leo (1990), Royal Navy Frigates Since 1945, Second Edition, Ian Allan Ltd (Surrey, UK), ISBN 0-7110-1915-0
- Meyer C J (1984) Modern Combat Ships 1: Leander Class, Littlehampton Book Services Ltd, ISBN 978-0711013858
- Osbourne, Richard and Sowdon, David (1991), Leander Class Frigates: History of Their Design and Development, 1958–90, World Ship Society, ISBN 978-0905617565
- Purvis, M K, Post War RN Frigate and Guided Missile Destroyer Design 1944–1969, Transactions, Royal Institution of Naval Architects (RINA), 1974
