= HMNZS Wellington (F69) =

Leander class frigate sunk as artificial reef off Wellington, New Zealand

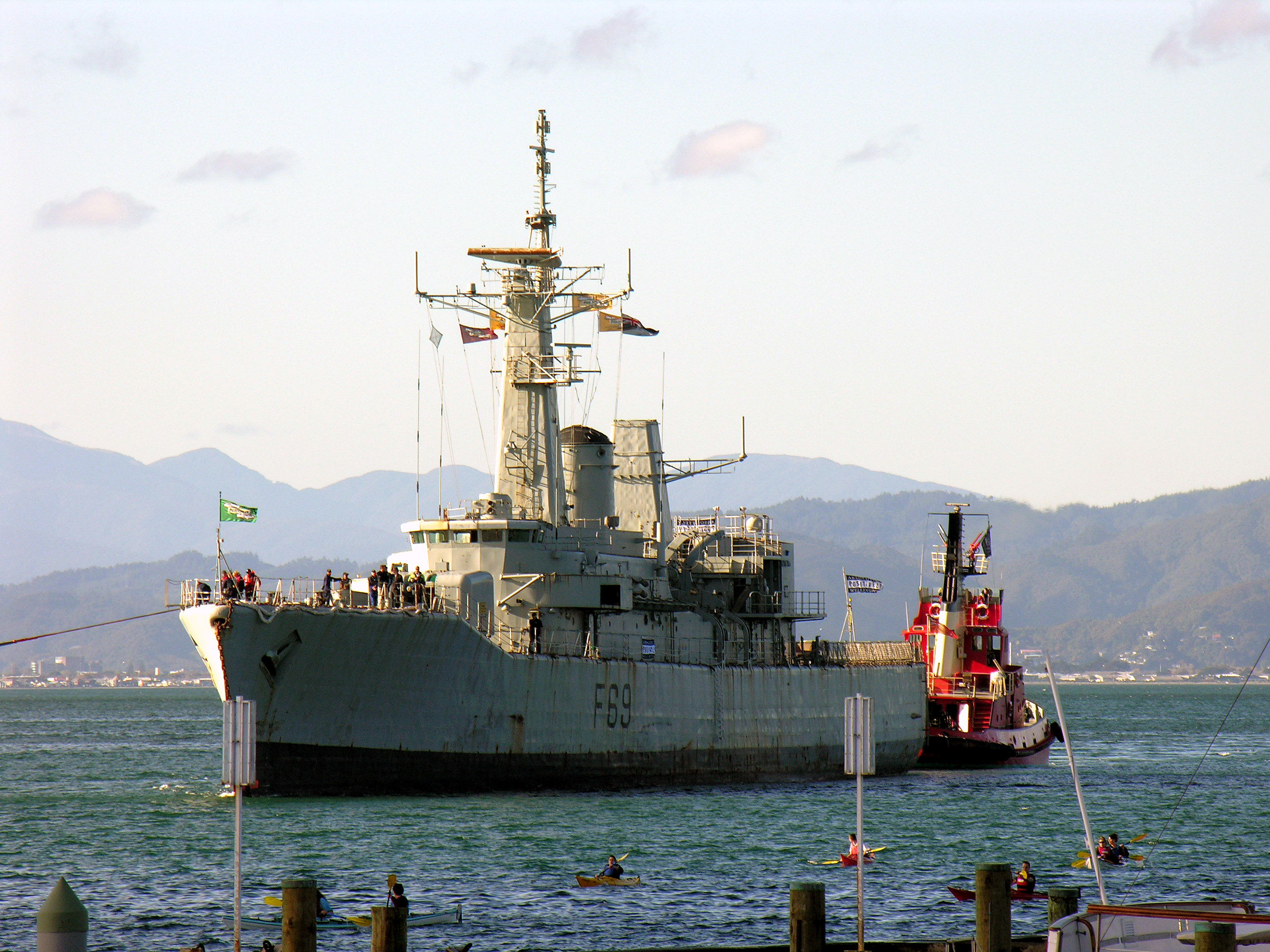
- HMNZS Wellington in 2005

History

New Zealand
- Name: HMNZS Wellington
- Commissioned: 1982
- Decommissioned: 1999
- Fate: Sunk as dive wreck in 2005

General characteristics
- Class & type: Leander-class frigate
- Displacement: 3,200 long tons (3,251 t) full load
- Length: 113.4 m (372 ft 1 in)
- Beam: 12.5 m (41 ft 0 in)
- Draught: 5.8 m (19 ft 0 in)
- Propulsion: 2 × Babcock & Wilcox boilers supplying steam to two sets of White-English Electric double-reduction geared turbines to two shafts
- Speed: 28 knots (52 km/h)
- Range: 4,600 nautical miles (8,500 km) at 15 knots (28 km/h)
- Complement: 223
- Armament: As built: 1 × twin 4.5 inch (114 mm) guns; 1 × quadruple Sea Cat anti-aircraft missile launchers; 1 × Limbo anti-submarine mortar; From 1980: 2 × triple torpedo tubes in place of the Limbo
- Aircraft carried: 1 × Westland Wasp helicopter

HMNZS Wellington was a Leander-class frigate of the Royal Navy and the Royal New Zealand Navy (RNZN). Originally commissioned in 1969 for the Royal Navy as HMS Bacchante, she joined the RNZN in 1982. She was decommissioned in 1999 and sunk in 2005.

== Refit ==
On arrival in New Zealand, Wellington was decommissioned and entered an extended refit which ended in 1986. The limited modernization proved difficult and took an unexpected 4 years. When inspected prior to purchase in 1981, she was in the condition expected for a Royal Navy (RN) frigate after a dozen years' service. However, in 1982 the frigate conducted a four-month winter patrol in the postwar Falklands exclusion zone with the other four RN unmodernised Leanders. Sea conditions in the Falkland exclusion zone meant more expensive hull repair was needed. Large-scale energy projects in New Zealand, particularly Marsden Point, resulted in a loss of key dockyard staff and recruitment difficulties. The installation of additional fuel tanks to extend the range of South Pacific operations proved difficult and dirty work. A new gunnery control system (RCA-76) along with surface and navigation radar were fitted, escape hatches were enlarged and asbestos was removed. The original estimated cost of transferring and refitting Bacchante and Dido to RNZN was $100m in 1981. By 1985 it reached $263m. Other minor changes were also made as a result of practical experiences of British frigates during the Falklands War.

Later refits saw new long-range air surveillance radar in place of the old 965 bedstead, with the Thales LW08 (1994) and the original Seacat missile removed and replaced by the Phalanx CIWS (1998).

== Operational history ==
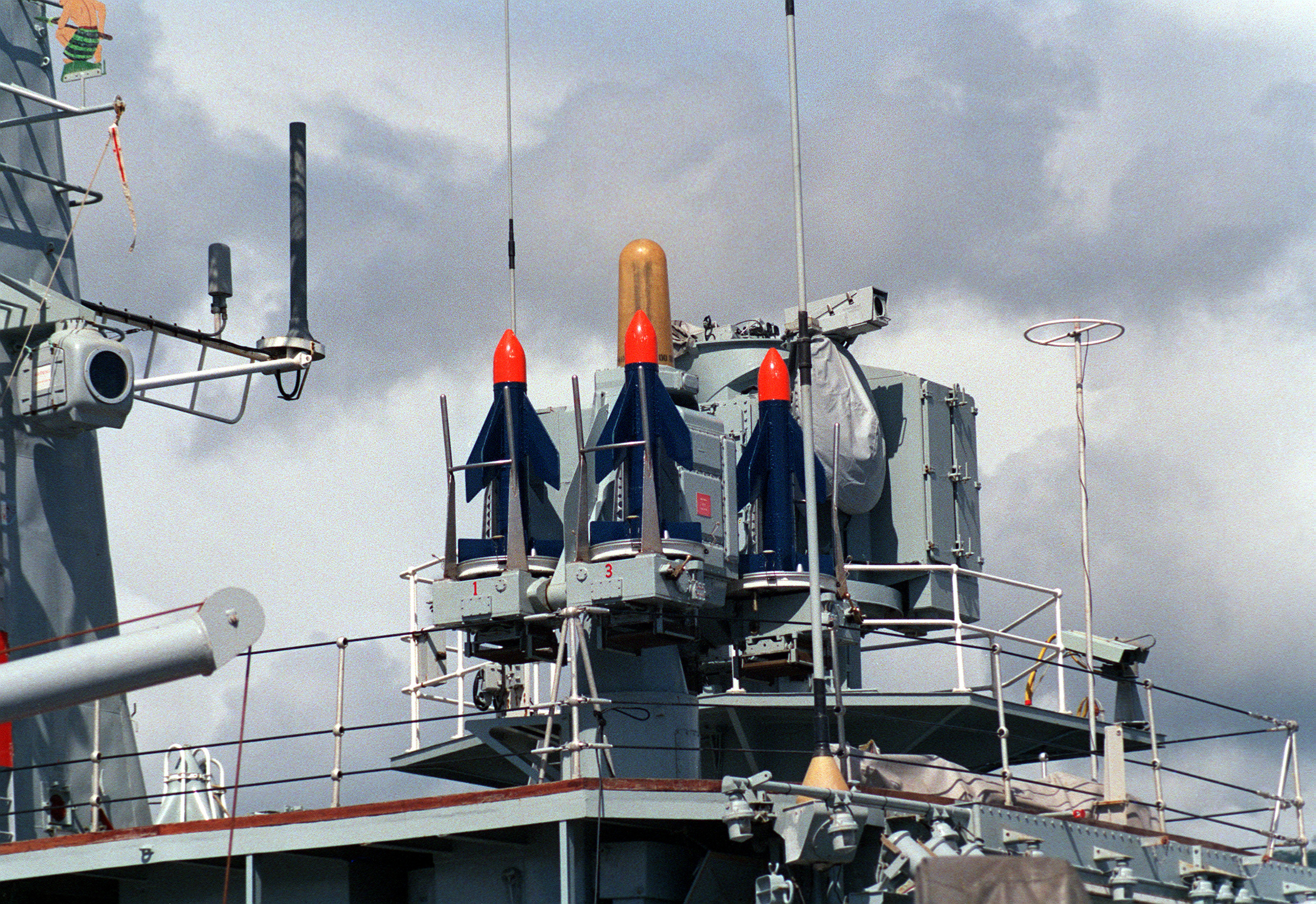
Sea Cat missile launcher on HMNZS Wellington, 1987

Like her sister-ship HMNZS Canterbury, Wellington was stood to during the First Coup in Fiji in 1987 to evacuate New Zealand and other foreign nationals should the need have arisen.

In 1988, Wellington accompanied HMNZ ships Canterbury, Endeavour and Waikato to Sydney, Australia to participate in the Bicentennial Salute to mark the 200th anniversary of the settlement of Europeans in that country. Vessels from the navies of Australia, Britain, France, Greece, India, Italy, Japan, Malaysia, the Netherlands, New Zealand, Pakistan, Papua New Guinea, Solomon Islands, United States and Vanuatu were represented.

In 1994, Wellington contributed to the international peacekeeping initiative in Bougainville along with Canterbury.

In 1995/1996, Wellington deployed to the Persian Gulf on the first of the RNZN deployments supporting the MIF (Multinational Interception Force) enforcing UN sanctions on Iraqi trade through the Gulf. Wellington successfully detained a number of vessels exporting dates from and attempting to import prohibited cargoes to Iraq. The frigate attended peace talks at Bougainville in July and August 1990. On 23 February 2017, it was announced by NZDF that the New Zealand Operations Service Medal (NZOSM) had been awarded to personnel who were in Bougainville for the Operation BIGTALK peace talks.

== Sinking ==
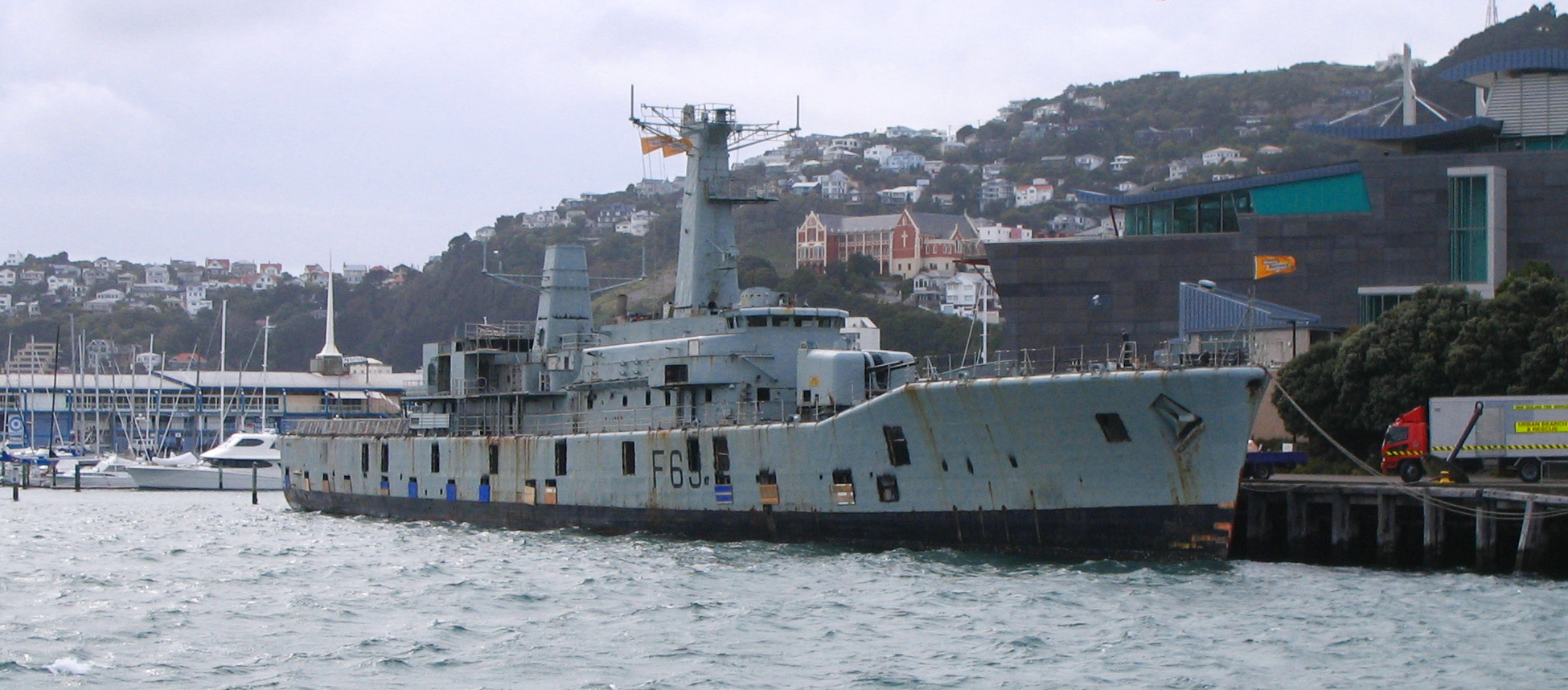
HMNZS Wellington prior to sinking, outside Te Papa

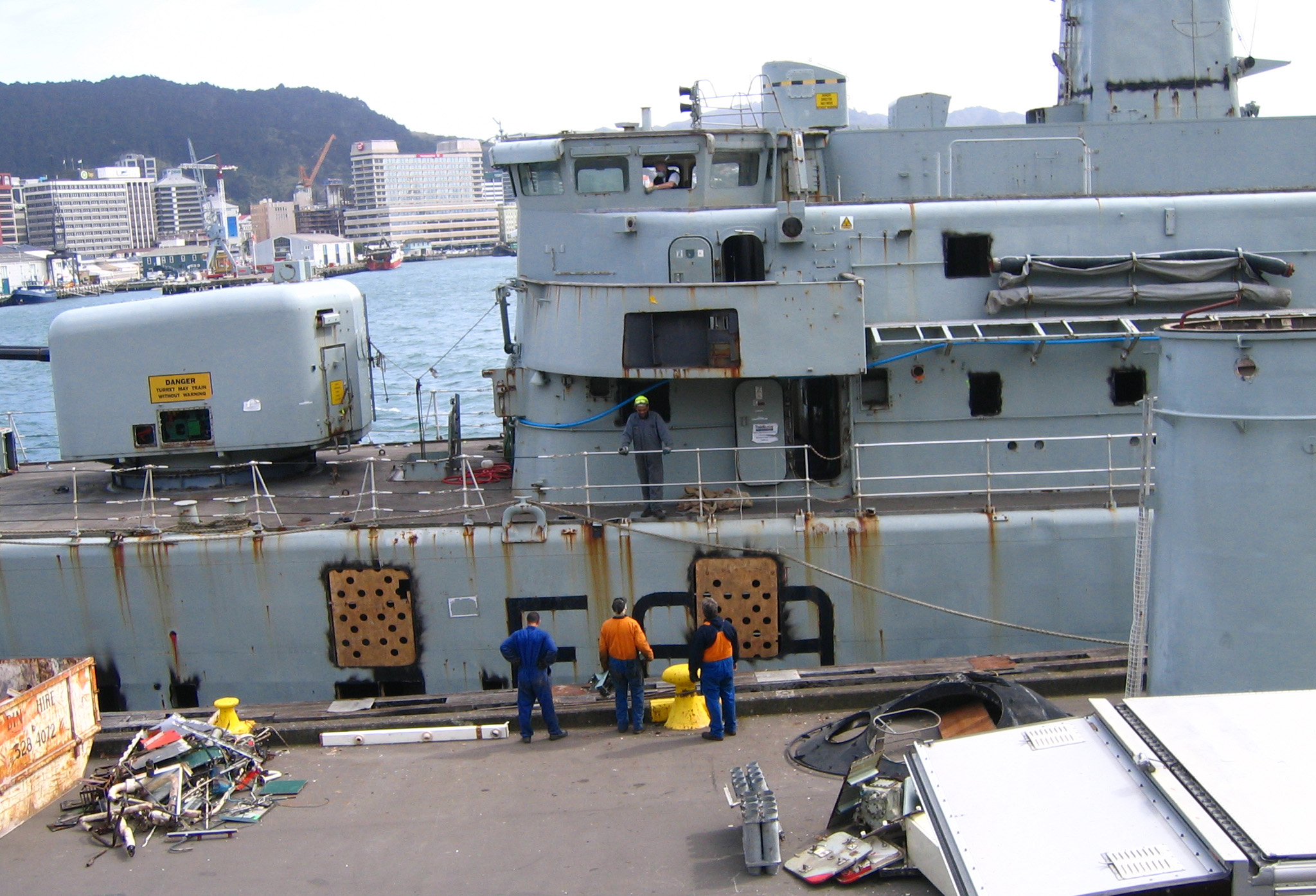
Removal of dangerous fittings and toxic substances, cutting of large holes in the hull

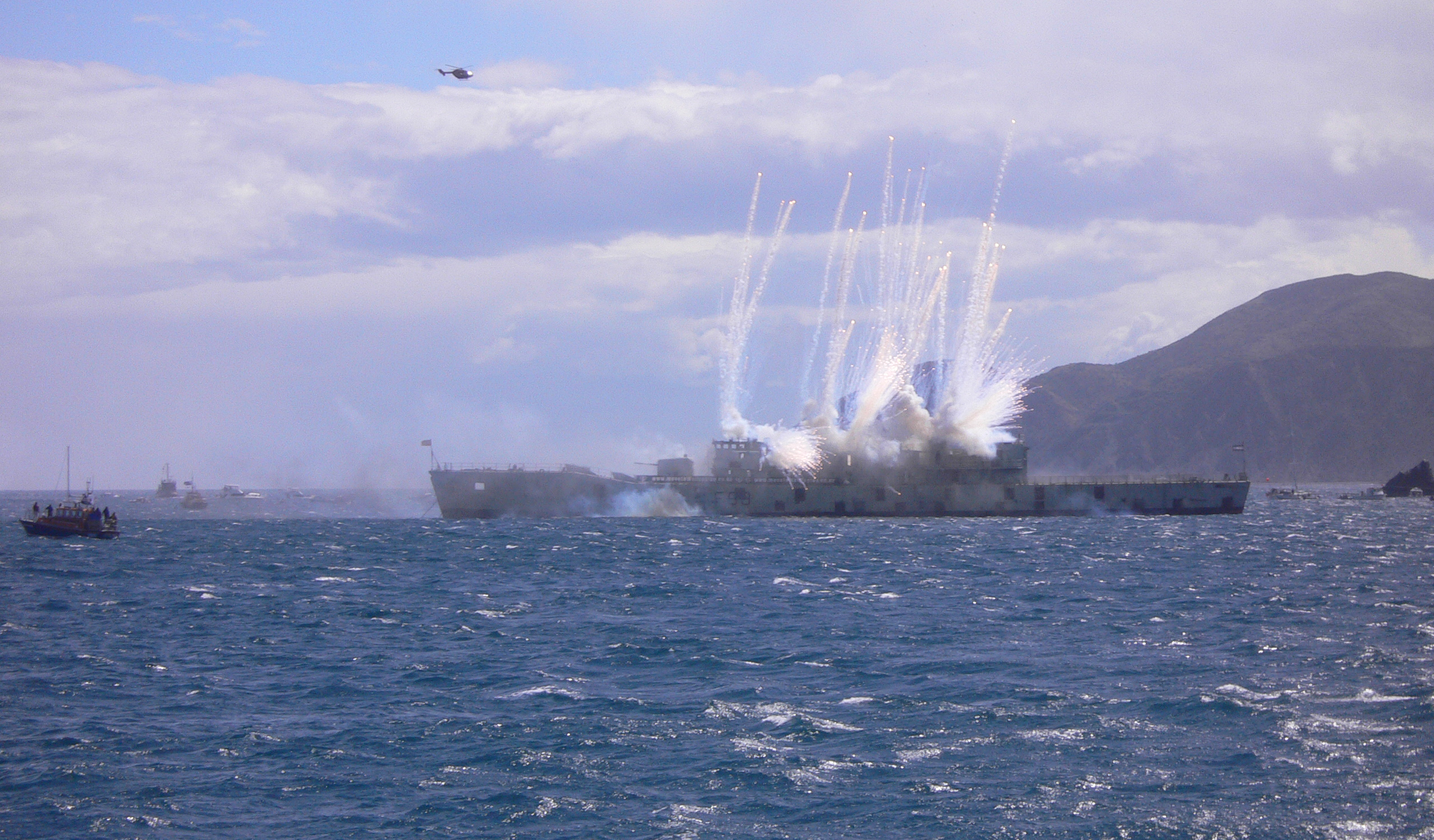
HMNZS Wellington being sunk

In November 2005, HMNZS Wellington was deliberately sunk off the south coast of Houghton Bay, Wellington just east of Island Bay.

Although the ship was due to be sunk at 3pm on 12 November 2005, this was delayed for 24 hours due to weather. The next day, the sinking was delayed by another 30 minutes due to strong winds as tugs worked hard getting F69 in proper alignment. At 3:30pm on 13 November, the button was pushed, the ship was scuttled, taking a mere minute and 55 seconds to sink below the surface. After Police Clearance Divers had checked all of the explosives had detonated and the ship was declared safe, Mayor Kerry Prendergast, husband Rex Nichols, Dominion Post Editor Tim Pankhurst and divemaster Bill Keddy from Splash Gordon Dive Shop were the first of the public to dive on the ship, now sitting upright on the seabed.

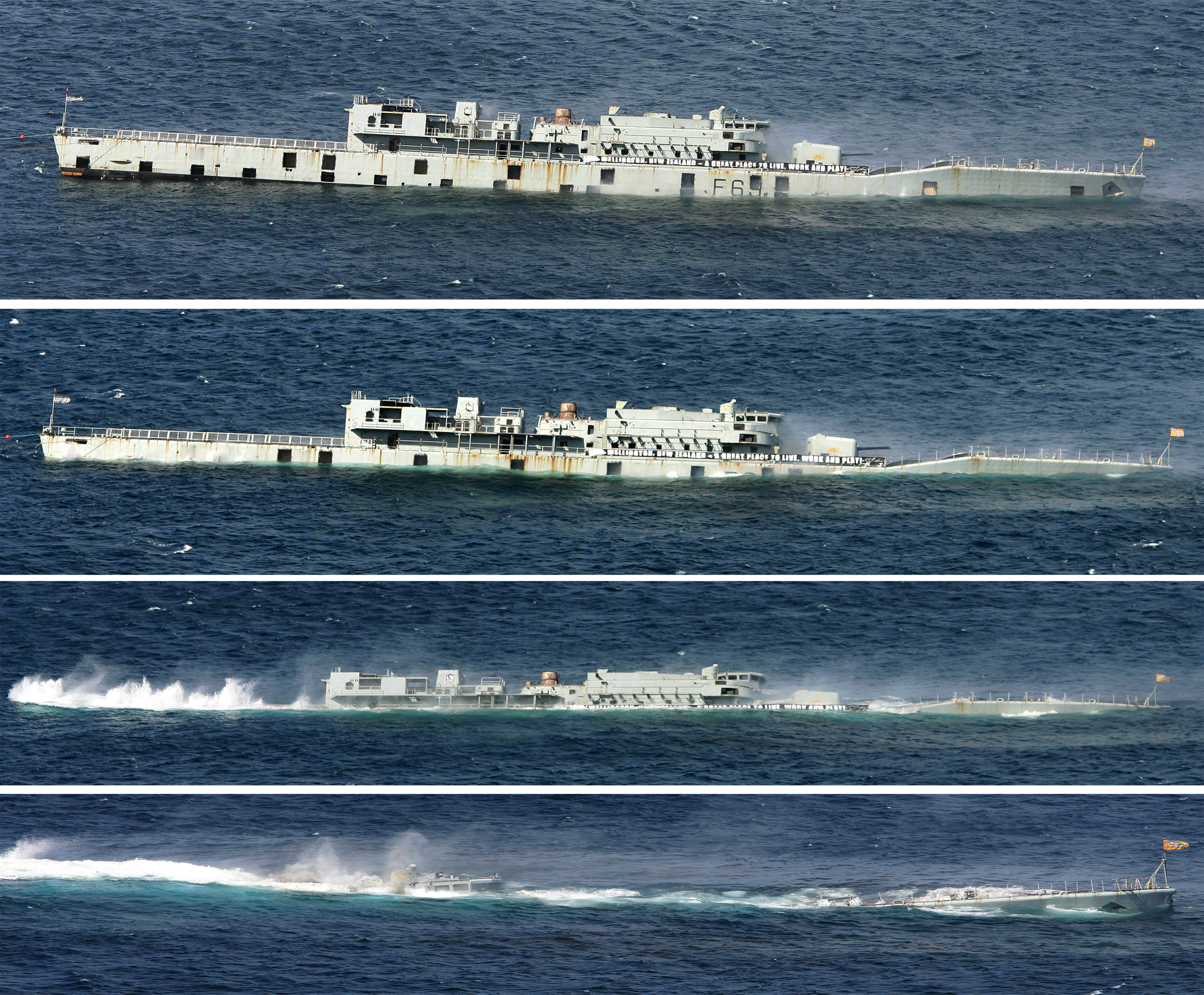
Under 2 minutes, F69 sank from view and settled upright on the seabed.

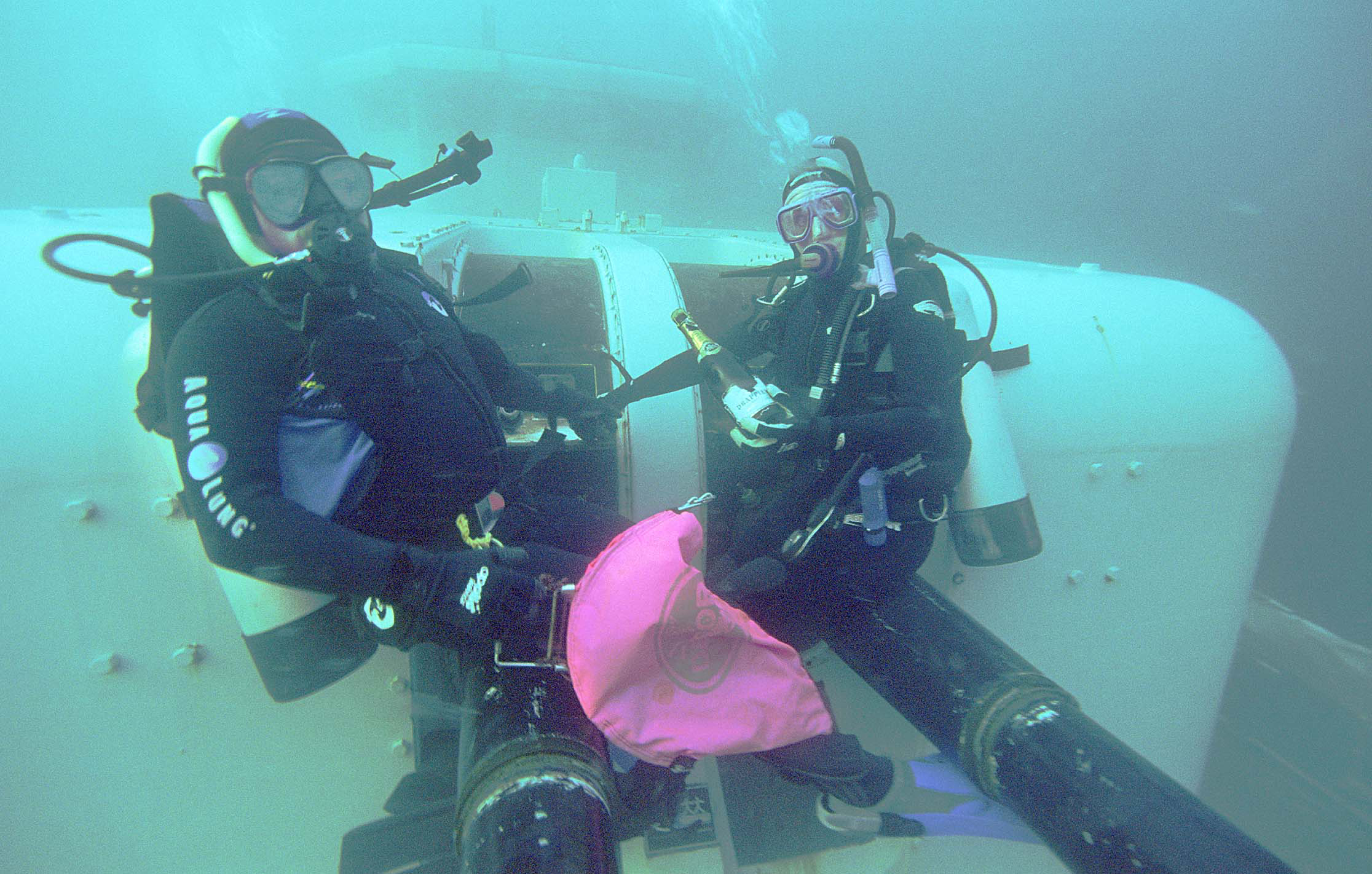
First to dive the ship, Tim Pankhurst and Mayor Kerry Prendergast pose on its guns.

Scuttling Day was and still is, the largest public event in Wellington's history with over 200,000 spectators on the cliff tops and beaches overlooking the site, next to Tapu te Ranga Island. The roads leading to the coast through Owhiro Bay, Island Bay, Houghton Bay and Lyall Bay were all clogged and jam packed as spectators abandoned thousands of cars where they could, filling all south coast roads with parked vehicles. It took several hours after the sinking before traffic flow was back to normal.

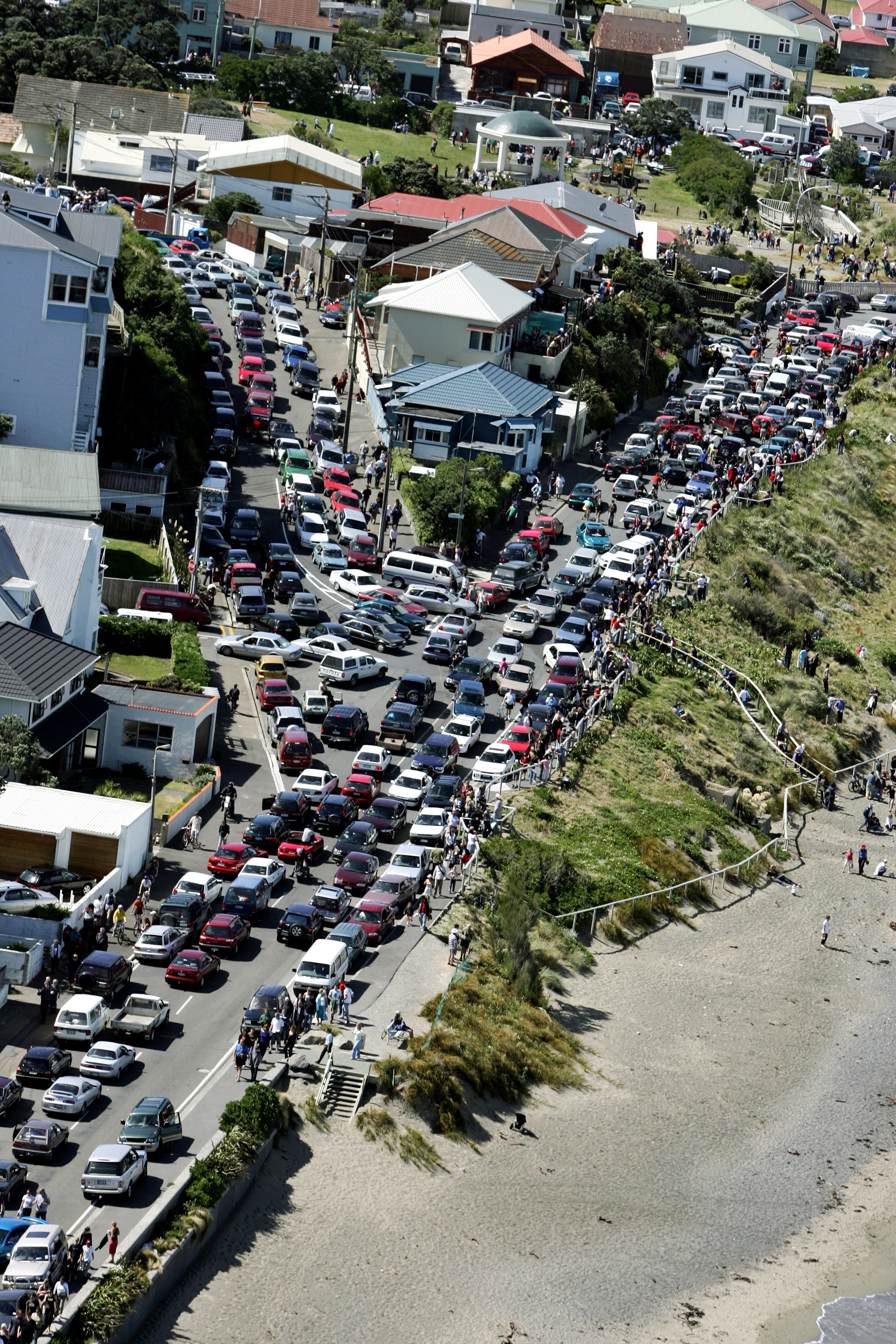
Jam Packed streets in Island Bay, thousands of abandoned cars as people flocked to the coast.

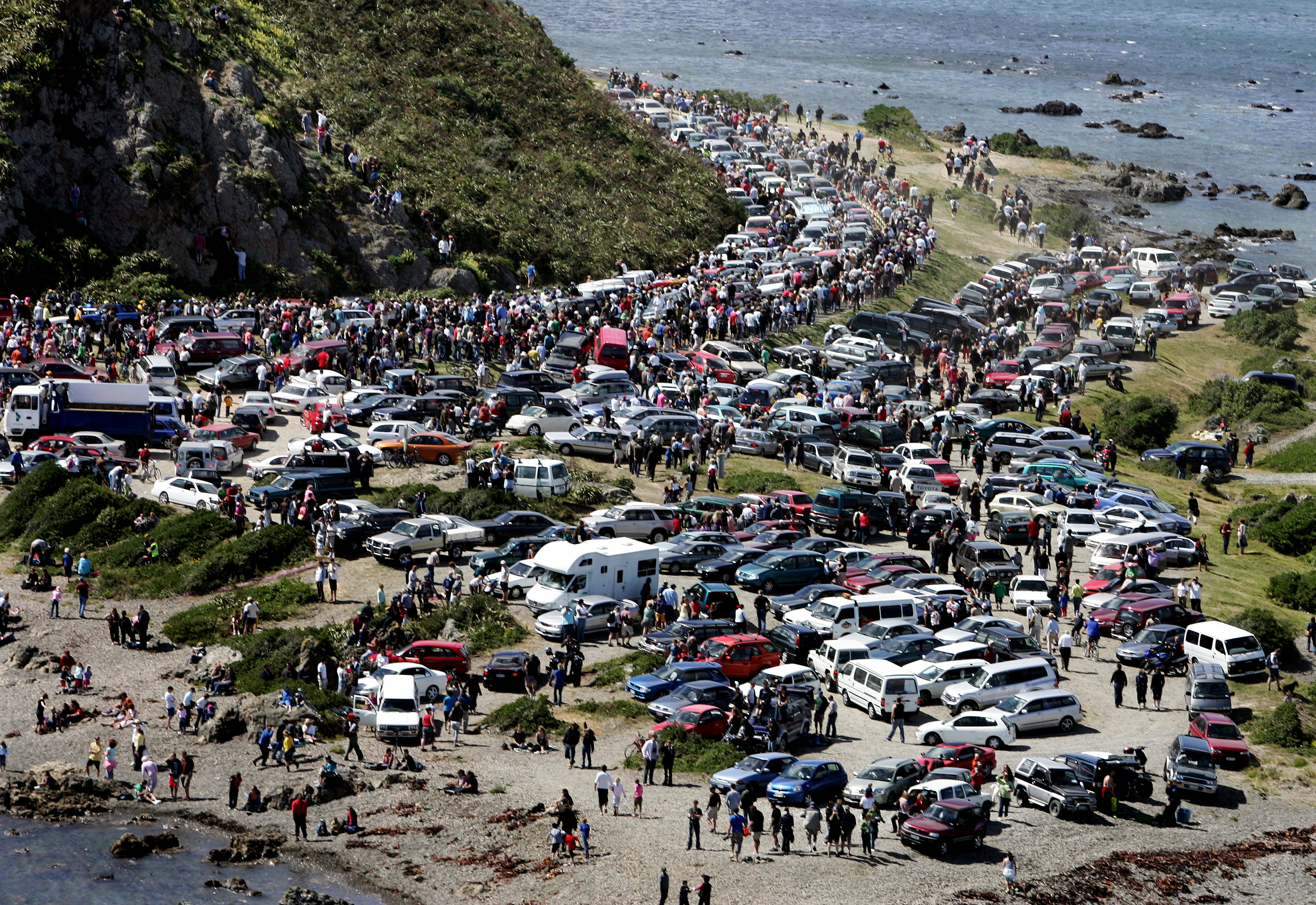
Princess Bay carpark and coast road jam packed with abandoned cars.

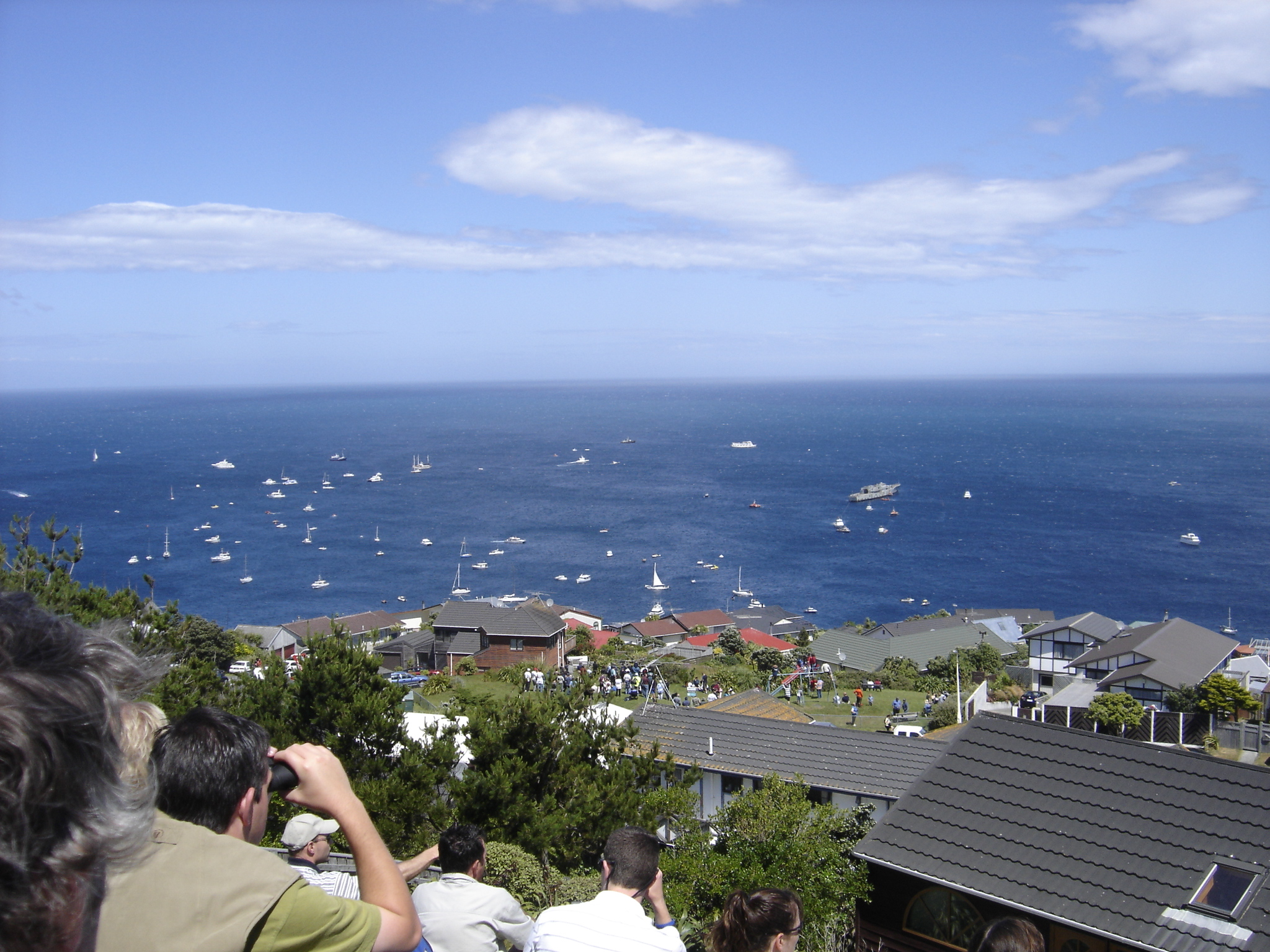
View from the hill tops over the scuttling site, countless spectator boats

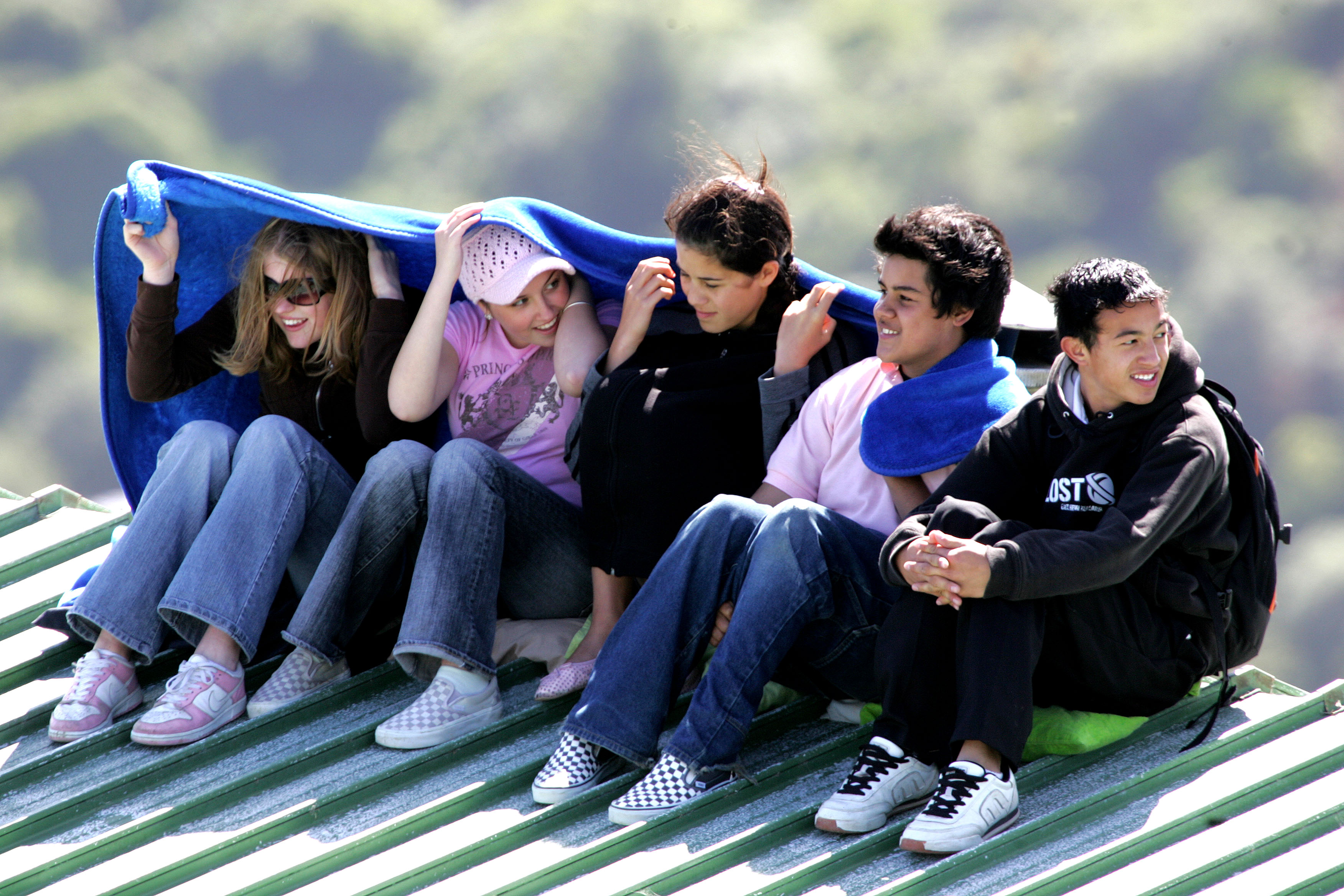
Spectators found every vantage point to witness the sinking, even rooftops

The project's initiator and chair of the SinkF69 Charitable Trust, Marco Zeeman, was named 2005 Wellingtonian of the Year, as well as receiving the Welly Community award for this project. The other trustees of the SinkF69 Trust were Rear Admiral Ian Hunter (RIP), tugmaster Lew Robinson, and event manager Graeme Anderson. Anderson was also site manager during the ship's preparation over the 6 months the ship was tied up in front of Te Papa, managing a demolition/clearance team as well as the many volunteers helping prepare the ship. During this time over 150,000 visitors traversed through the ship witnessing the cleanup process and seeing thousands of items being stripped from the vessel, many being sold on Trade Me to collectors around the country. Some of the parts like bulkhead doors live on in other ships, used as replacements or added access ways.

During a massive storm with huge 13-metre swells the following year, in February 2006, the ship's bow broke off and lay onto its side, secured by its 12-tonne mushroom anchor, with the hanger space collapsing under the pressure of the massive waves.

F69 is now lying mainly in two sections on the seabed close to where it was sunk. The bow is lying on its side complete with its 4.5" guns, with the bridge and midship area sitting nearby 41°21.18′S 174°46.80′E.

The depth of her keel is approximately 21 metres (69 ft), making the wreck accessible by scuba divers using standard equipment. An Open Water Scuba Certificate is recommended as well as diving with an experienced guide. The former HMNZS Wellington continues to be a premier dive location, with local dive company Dive Wellington operating year round, offering courses including Open Water, Wreck Diving and other specialties. Island Bay Divers is another operator located close to this artificial reef, now teeming with life and located within the Tapu Te Ranga Marine Reserve.

F69's two 12' diameter 5-bladed bronze propellers remain as land-based memorials to the ship of this city's name. One propeller has been placed into the historic Graving Dock area next to Te Papa and the other is mounted in Houghton Bay, overlooking the dive site. A third propeller that was acquired at decommissioning, the spare, is currently held in storage by Wellington City Council for use at a later time.

== See also ==
- Frigates of the Royal New Zealand Navy
