= HMS Achilles (F12) =

Type 12I or Leander-class frigate of the Royal Navy and Chilean Navy

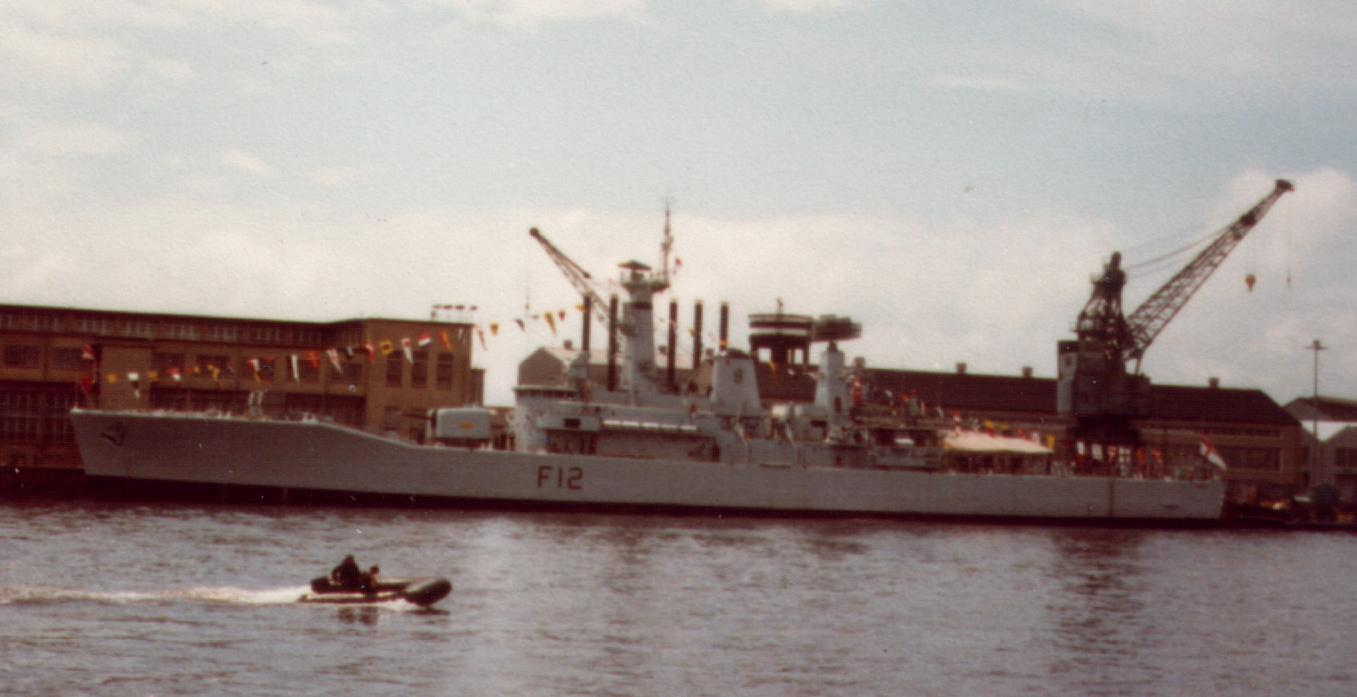
- Achilles at Chatham on 3 May 1981

History

United Kingdom
- Name: HMS Achilles
- Builder: Yarrow Shipbuilders
- Laid down: 1 December 1967
- Launched: 21 November 1968
- Commissioned: 9 July 1970
- Decommissioned: January 1990
- Identification: Pennant number: F12
- Fate: Sold to Chilean Navy

Chile
- Name: Ministro Zenteno
- Namesake: José Ignacio Zenteno
- Commissioned: 8 January 1991
- Decommissioned: August 2006
- Fate: Washed away by tsunami, February 2010; Scuttled March 2010

General characteristics
- Class & type: Leander-class frigate
- Displacement: 3,200 long tons (3,251 t) full load
- Length: 113.4 m (372 ft)
- Beam: 12.5 m (41 ft)
- Draught: 5.8 m (19 ft)
- Propulsion: 2 × Babcock & Wilcox boilers supplying steam to two sets of White-English Electric double-reduction geared turbines to two shafts
- Speed: 28 knots (52 km/h)
- Range: 4,600 nautical miles (8,500 km) at 15 knots (28 km/h)
- Complement: 223
- Armament: As built 1 × twin 4.5 inch (114 mm) guns 1 × quadruple Sea Cat anti-aircraft missile launchers 1 × Limbo anti-submarine mortar From 1980 1 x twin 4.5 inch (114 mm) guns 2 × quadruple Seacat anti-aircraft missile launchers 2 × single 40 mm Bofors anti-aircraft guns 2 × triple torpedo tubes
- Aircraft carried: As built 1 × Westland Wasp helicopter From 1980 1 × Lynx helicopter

HMS Achilles was a Leander-class frigate of the Royal Navy. She was built by Yarrow at Glasgow. She was launched on 21 November 1968 and commissioned on 9 July 1970. She was sold to Chile in 1991 and served in the Chilean Navy as Ministro Zenteno. She was washed away from her berth at Talcahuano by a tsunami following the February 2010 Chile earthquake, and ran aground on the coast a few kilometres to the north. She was scuttled the following month by the Chilean Navy as a danger to navigation.

== Construction and design ==
Achilles was one of three Batch 3, "Broad-Beamed" Leander-class frigates ordered from Yarrow Shipbuilders in early 1967, the others being Diomede and Jupiter. She was laid down on 1 December 1967, launched on 21 November 1968 and completed on 9 July 1970, commissioning on 11 July with the Pennant number F12.

Achilles was 372 feet (113.4 m) long overall and 360 feet (109.7 m) at the waterline, with a beam of 43 feet (13.1 m) and a maximum draught of 19 feet (5.8 m). Displacement was 2,500 long tons (2,500 t) standard and 2,962 long tons (3,010 t) full load. Two oil-fired boilers fed steam at 550 pounds per square inch (3,800 kPa) and 850 °F (454 °C) to a pair of double reduction geared steam turbines that in turn drove two propeller shafts, with the machinery rated at 30,000 shaft horsepower (22,000 kW), giving a speed of 28 knots (52 km/h; 32 mph).

A twin 4.5-inch (113 mm) Mark 6 gun mount was fitted forward. A single Sea Cat surface-to-air missile launcher was fitted aft (on the Helicopter hangar roof), while two Oerlikon 20mm cannon provided close-in defence. A Limbo anti-submarine mortar was fitted aft to provide a short-range anti-submarine capability, while a hangar and helicopter deck allowed a single Westland Wasp helicopter to be operated, for longer range anti-submarine and anti-surface operations.

Achilles was fitted with a large Type 965 long range air search radar on the ship's mainmast, with a Type 993 short range air/surface target indicating radar and Type 978 navigation radar carried on the ship's foremast. An MRS3 fire control system was carried to direct the 4.5-inch guns. The ship had a sonar suite of Type 184 medium range search sonar, Type 162 bottom search and Type 170 attack sonar.

== Service history ==
In 1970, Achilles deployed to the Far East where there was, at that time, a large British naval presence. She escorted a number of larger vessels while there, including the aircraft carrier HMS Eagle.

In 1974, Achilles joined the 3rd Frigate Squadron, and later that year deployed to the Far East on a nine-month deployment as part of Task Group 317.2. The task group visited a number of African ports on their way to the Far East and Indian Ocean, including South Africa, a visit that caused some controversy back in the UK at the time. The task group visited a variety of ports in the Far East and took part in a number of exercises. Achilles was active as a radio relay vessel during the fall of South Vietnam.

Upon the task group's return from the Far East, they made their way around the Cape of Good Hope to South America where a large exercise with the Brazilian Navy took place, which included the aircraft carrier HMS Ark Royal. Achilles returned to the UK in June 1975.

On 12 November 1975, Achilles collided with the Greek tanker Olympic Alliance in heavy fog in the Dover Strait, causing a number of injuries aboard Achilles together with heavy damage to the frigate's bow, while a large oil slick was released from the tanker into the Channel. Achilles was under repair at Devonport Dockyard until March 1976, with her complete bow section needing to be replaced. The following year, Achilles joined the Fishery Protection Squadron during the Third Cod War with Iceland, spending one week on patrol. During that year also, HMS Achilles was covertly deployed to Belize during the Guatemalan emergency.

After her deployment during the Third Cod War, Achilles went on a number of deployments including to the Persian Gulf as well as being involved in a number of naval exercises.

Achilles was intended to be modernised, (probably involving removal of her one 4.5-inch twin gun, which would have been replaced by the Exocet anti-ship missile and Sea Wolf anti-aircraft missiles, but possibly also involving fitting of a towed array sonar), but the modernisation was cancelled due to the 1981 Defence Review by the minister, John Nott, and it was instead planned to dispose of the unmodernised frigate, despite the long life remaining in her hull. In 1982, Achilles deployed to the West Indies as guardship. The following year, she deployed to the Falkland Islands to patrol the area in the aftermath of the Falklands War. Later that year Achilles took part in Exercise Orient Express, which took place in the Indian Ocean. She deployed to the Persian Gulf that same year.

By the late 1980s, Achilles career was coming to an end. In 1989 she joined the Dartmouth Training Squadron, and in a busy year became the first Royal Navy warship to visit East Germany as well as hosting a dinner to mark the 50th anniversary of the Battle of the River Plate. In January 1990 Achilles decommissioned, ending her career, though only with the Royal Navy. However, the name Achilles lives on as TS Achilles, the Trowbridge branch of the Sea Cadet Corps. Sold to the Chilean Navy in 1991, she served until 2006 with the name Ministro Zenteno. From 2006 until late February 2010 she was in reserve.

== Fate ==
On 27 February 2010 a tsunami associated with the 2010 Chile earthquake washed her several nautical miles from her berth in the Talcahuano naval base, towards the coastal city of Dichato. In March 2010, the Chilean Navy decided to sink the ship to ensure free navigation in the area where the ship had run aground. The mission was performed by the crew of the offshore patrol vessel Piloto Pardo.

== Bibliography ==
- Blackman, Raymond V. B., ed. (1971). Jane's Fighting Ships 1971–72. London: Sampson Low Marston & Co., Ltd. ISBN 0-354-00096-9.
- Colledge, J. J.; Warlow, Ben (2006) [1969]. Ships of the Royal Navy: The Complete Record of All Fighting Ships of the Royal Navy from the 15th Century to the Present (3rd Rev ed.). London: Chatham Publishing. ISBN 978-1-86176-281-8. OCLC 67375475.
- Critchley, Mike (1986). British Warships Since 1945: Part 5 Frigates. Liskeard, UK: Maritime Books. ISBN 0-907771-13-0.
- Friedman, Norman (2008). British Destroyers & Frigates: The Second World War and After. Barnsley, UK: Seaforth Publishing. ISBN 978-1-84832-015-4.
- Marriott, Leo (1983). Royal Navy Frigates 1945–1983. Shepperton, Surrey, UK: Ian Allan. ISBN 0-7110-1322-5.
- Osborne, Richard; Sowdon, David (1990). Leander Class Frigates. Kendal, UK: World Ships Society. ISBN 0-905617-56-8.
