= HMS Sirius (F40) =

1966 Type 12I or Leander-class frigate of the Royal Navy

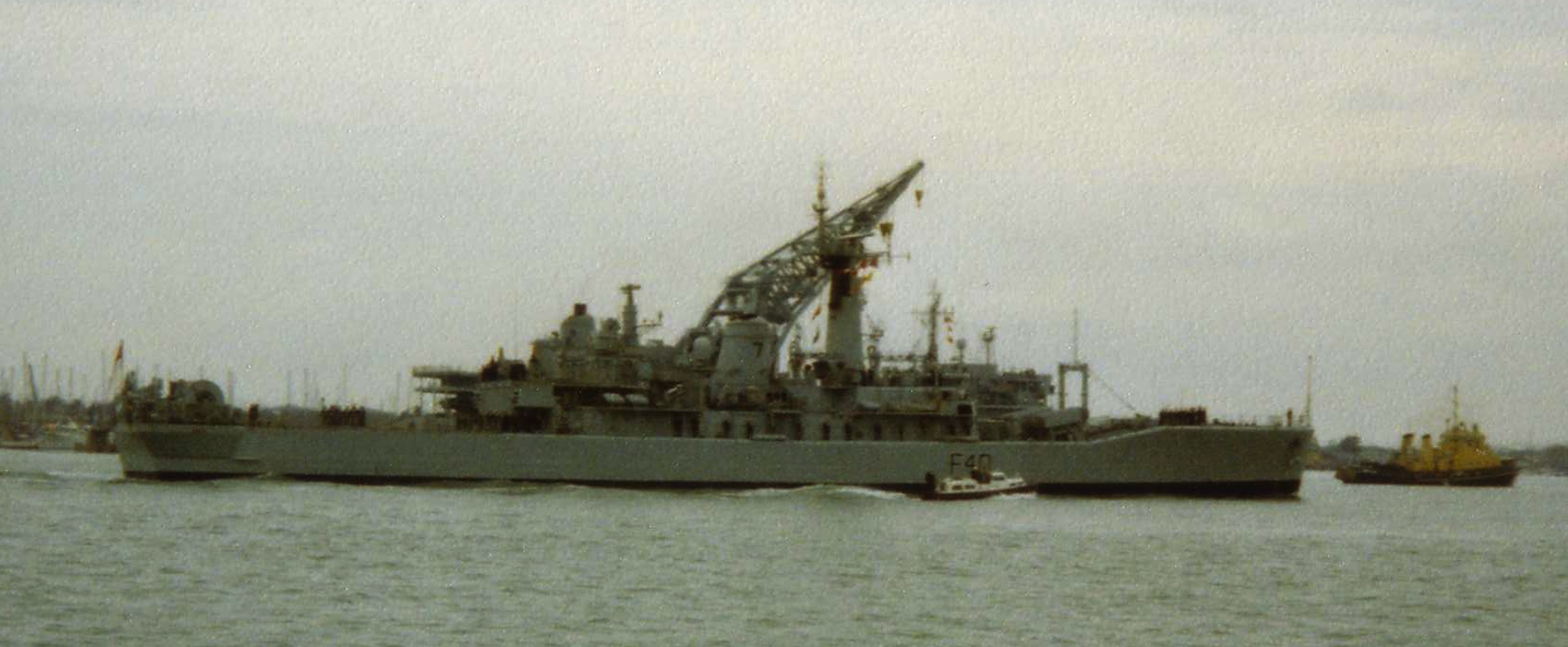

History

United Kingdom
- Name: HMS Sirius
- Builder: HMNB Portsmouth
- Laid down: 9 August 1963
- Launched: 22 September 1964
- Commissioned: 15 June 1966
- Decommissioned: 27 February 1993
- Identification: F40
- Motto: Heaven's light our guide
- Fate: Sunk as target 1998

General characteristics
- Class & type: Leander-class frigate
- Displacement: 3,200 long tons (3,251 t) full load
- Length: 113.4 m (372 ft)
- Beam: 12.5 m (41 ft)
- Draught: 5.8 m (19 ft)
- Propulsion: 2 × Babcock & Wilcox boilers supplying steam to two sets of White-English Electric double-reduction geared turbines to two shafts
- Speed: 28 knots (52 km/h)
- Range: 4,600 nautical miles (8,500 km) at 15 knots (28 km/h)
- Complement: 223
- Armament: As built: 1 × twin 4.5 inch (114 mm) guns; 1 × quadruple Sea Cat anti-aircraft missile launchers; 1 × Limbo anti-submarine mortar; 2 x Oerlikon 20 mm cannon; From 1980: 4 × Exocet anti-ship missile launchers; 2 × quadruple Seacat anti-aircraft missile launchers; 2 × single 40 mm Bofors anti-aircraft guns; 2 × triple torpedo tubes
- Aircraft carried: 1 × Westland Wasp helicopter; From 1980: 1 × Lynx helicopter

HMS Sirius (F40) was a Leander-class frigate of the Royal Navy (RN) built by H.M. Dockyard Portsmouth, and was the penultimate RN warship to be built there for a period of forty years, until Vosper Thornycroft built HMS Clyde. Sirius was launched on 22 September 1964 and commissioned on 15 June 1966. The ship continued in front line service until February 1992.

== Construction ==
Sirius was one of three Leander-class frigates ordered in the autumn of 1962 for the Royal Navy as part of the 1962–63 construction programme. The ship was laid down at Portsmouth Dockyard on 9 August 1963, was launched on 22 September 1964 and was completed and commissioned on 15 June 1966.

Sirius was 372 feet (113.4 m) long overall and 360 feet (109.7 m) at the waterline, with a beam of 41 feet (12.5 m) and a maximum draught of 18 feet (5.5 m). Displacement was 2,380 long tons (2,420 t) standard and 2,860 long tons (2,910 t) full load. The ship was fitted with Y-136 machinery, built by J Samuel White. Two oil-fired Babcock & Wilcox boilers fed steam at 550 pounds per square inch (3,800 kPa) and 850 °F (454 °C) to a pair of double reduction geared steam turbines that in turn drove two propeller shafts, with the machinery rated at 30,000 shaft horsepower (22,000 kW), giving a speed of 28 knots (52 km/h; 32 mph).

A twin 4.5-inch (113 mm) Mark 6 gun mount was fitted forward. The anti-aircraft defence was provided by a quadruple Sea Cat surface-to-air missile launcher on the hangar roof and two Oerlikon 20 mm cannon. A Limbo anti-submarine mortar was fitted aft to provide a short-range anti-submarine capability, while a hangar and helicopter deck allowed a single Westland Wasp helicopter to be operated, for longer range anti-submarine and anti-surface operations.

As built, Sirius was fitted with a large Type 965 long-range air search radar on the ship's mainmast, with a Type 993 short-range air/surface target indicating radar and Type 974 navigation radar carried on the ship's foremast. An MRS3 fire control system was carried over the ship's bridge to direct the 4.5-inch guns, while a GWS22 director for Seacat was mounted on the hangar roof. The ship had a sonar suite of Type 177 or Type 182 search sonar, Type 162 bottom search and Type 170 attack sonar. While she had a well for a Type 199 Variable depth sonar (VDS), this was never fitted, and the well was soon plated over.

== Operational history ==
Following commissioning, Sirius joined the 24th Escort Squadron, and took part in that year's Portsmouth Navy Day. On 28 November 1966, Sirius set out from Portsmouth for the Far East, in order to join the Singapore-based 2nd Destroyer Squadron. Early in 1967, she interrupted her passage out to Singapore to carry out a deployment on the Beira Patrol, which was designed to prevent oil reaching landlocked Rhodesia via the then Portuguese colony of Mozambique. After Sirius reached her station at Singapore, the frigate took part in a number of 'fly-the-flag' visits to a variety of ports. Sirius also took part in the Coronation of Taufa'ahau Tupou IV of Tonga. The following year, Sirius deployed to the West Indies. In 1968 she took part in Portsmouth 'Navy Days'. Between 1966 and 1968 she was commanded by Derek Reffell.

In April 1970, Sirius again deployed to the West Indies, where she would perform the role of guard ship in that region, relieving Mohawk. On 1 August 1970, the ferry Chistena sank off St. Kitts, killing 233 people. Sirius took part in rescue operations, recovering bodies from the sea. Only 91 people survived the ferry sinking. For the actions of her crew, Sirius was awarded the Wilkinson Sword of Peace. The West Indies Guardship deployment was eventually replaced by the Atlantic Patrol Task. In 1973, Sirius became guard ship to the West Indies once more, performing a variety of duties while there, including counter-drug operations. Later in the same year she appeared in an official government documentary during AAW and ASW exercises, along with RAS with RFA Grey Rover (A269) and a port visit to Madeira.

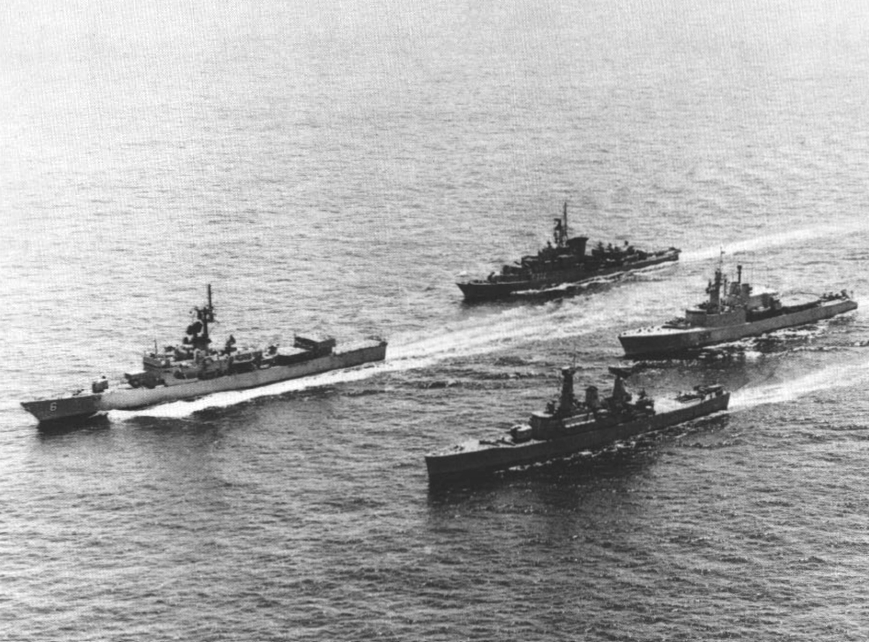
Ships of NATO Standing Naval Force Atlantic (STANAVFORLANT), including HMS Sirius, underway in 1974

In 1974, Sirius joined Standing Naval Force Atlantic (STANAVFORLANT), a multi-national squadron of NATO, taking part in naval exercises in the process and visiting a variety of ports, and one of many deployments with NATO's multi-national squadrons. In 1975, Sirius began her modernisation which included the removal of her single 4.5-in twin gun in favour of the Exocet anti-ship missile system, as well as the amount of Sea Cat missiles she carried, increased. The modernisation was completed in October 1977. In 1978, Sirius became the leader of the 6th Frigate Squadron.

In September 1982, Sirius deployed to the Falkland Islands to perform a Falkland Islands patrol in the tense aftermath of the Falklands War. The following year, Sirius received the towed array sensor. In 1988, Sirius, as part of the group deployment Exercise 'Outback 88', deployed to the Far East and Pacific, attended Exercise Starfish with New Zealand, Australian, Malaysian and Singaporean naval units, and visited Australia for the 1988 bicentennial naval Salute, visiting a variety of ports in the process.

Sirius was paid off on 17 February 1992 and was stricken on 28 February 1993. She was subsequently towed to Pembroke Dockyard in preparation for her to be sunk as a target. However, her sinking was delayed by environmentalist groups. In 1998, Sirius was finally sunk as a target in the Atlantic Ocean by the submarine Spartan and the Type 23 frigate, Monmouth. Her sinking left just one Leander, Scylla, afloat in the United Kingdom; Scylla was later sunk as an artificial reef on 27 March 2004.

== Publications ==
- Baker, A. D. III (1998). The Naval Institute Guide to Combat Fleets of the World 1998–1999: Their Ships, Aircraft and Systems. Annapolis, Maryland, USA: Naval Institute Press. ISBN 1-55750-111-4.
- Colledge, J. J.; Warlow, Ben (2006) [1969]. Ships of the Royal Navy: The Complete Record of All Fighting Ships of the Royal Navy from the 15th Century to the Present (3rd Rev ed.). London: Chatham Publishing. ISBN 978-1-86176-281-8. OCLC 67375475.
- Critchley, Mike (1992). British Warships Since 1945: Part 5: Frigates. Liskeard, UK: Maritime Press. ISBN 0-907771-13-0.
- Friedman, Norman (2008). British Destroyers & Frigates: The Second World War and After. Barnsley, UK: Seaforth Publishing. ISBN 978-1-84832-015-4.
- Marriott, Leo (1983). Royal Navy Frigates 1945–1983. Shepperton, Surrey, UK: Ian Allan Ltd. ISBN 0-7110-1322-5.
- Moore, John, ed. (1979). Jane's Fighting Ships 1979–1980. London: Jane's Yearbooks. ISBN 0-354-00587-1.
- Moore, John, ed. (1985). Jane's Fighting Ships 1985–1986. London: Jane's Yearbooks. ISBN 0-7106-0814-4.
- Osborne, Richard; Sowdon, David (1990). Leander Class Frigates. Kendal, UK: World Ships Society. ISBN 0-905617-56-8.
