= HMS Charybdis (F75) =

1969 Type 12I or Leander-class frigate of the Royal Navy

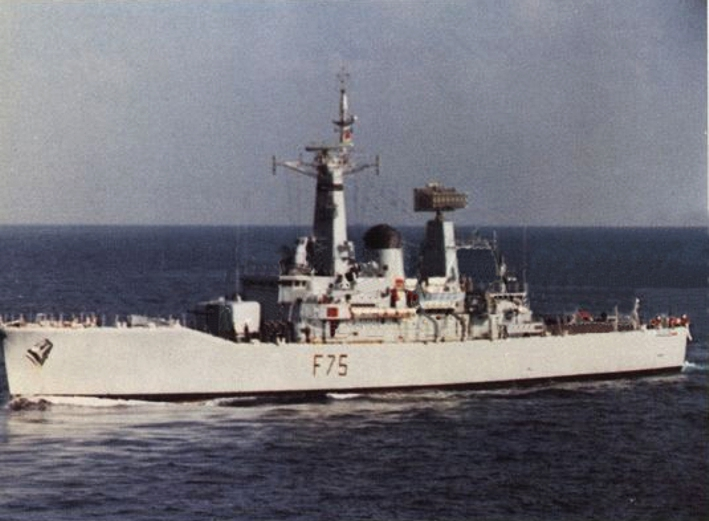
- HMS Charybdis

History

United Kingdom
- Name: Charybdis
- Builder: Harland and Wolff
- Laid down: 27 January 1967
- Launched: 28 February 1968
- Commissioned: 2 June 1969
- Decommissioned: 30 September 1991
- Identification: Pennant number: F75
- Fate: Sunk as target 11 June 1993

General characteristics
- Class & type: Leander-class frigate

HMS Charybdis (F75) was a Leander-class frigate of the Royal Navy (RN). She was built by the Harland & Wolff company of Belfast, and was the last ship to be built there for British naval forces until RFA Fort Victoria of the Royal Fleet Auxiliary, was launched in 1990. Charybdis was launched on 28 February 1968 and commissioned on 2 June 1969. Her nickname was "Cherry B".

== Operational Service ==
In 1969, Charybdis became guard ship of Gibraltar. The following year, Charybdis deployed to the Far East and Pacific at a time when there was a large RN presence in those regions. During her time there, Charybdis took part in a number of exercises with Commonwealth countries, including Exercise Longex with New Zealand. Charybdis visited many countries on 'fly the flag' duties, which remains a prominent role for a Royal Navy warship.

In 1973 Charybdis spent time in the Second Cod War when Iceland wanted to extend their control of the fishing waters from 12 to 50 miles (19 to 80 km). At that time there were normally three frigates and three ocean-going tugs deployed to protect the groups of British fishing trawlers.

In 1976, Charybdis was deployed to the Mediterranean. The following year, Charybdis joined the Fishery Protection Squadron, just a year after the Third Cod War ended. Charybdis took part in the Fleet Review to celebrate the Silver Jubilee of Queen Elizabeth II. At this time she was part of the 6th Frigate Squadron. In early 1979, Charybdis underwent yet another Mediterranean patrol.

From 1979 to 1982, Charybdis underwent modernisation that included the fitting of Exocet and Sea Wolf missiles, and the removal of her twin 4.5 in guns. The refit was cut short and Charybdis was rushed back into service due to the Argentinean invasion of the Falkland Islands. In late 1982, in the aftermath of the Falklands War, Charybdis deployed on a Falkland Islands patrol, which at the time was still a tense region. Through the rest of the 1980s, Charybdis undertook duties in the West Indies, Mediterranean and in the Persian Gulf. In 1984 she was again deploying to the Falkland Islands as part of a task group, but was detached from the group whilst in Gibraltar and diverted to the Gulf region where she joined HM Ships Glasgow and Falmouth and RFA Orangeleaf. On the arrival of Charybdis, Falmouth was detached to the Far East. A group call into Karachi by Charybdis, Glasgow and Orangeleaf for scheduled maintenance was the last port visit by the group as, due to rising tensions, all port visits were cancelled. In 1985 she deployed yet again to the Gulf as part of the Armilla Patrol protecting ships transiting the Straits of Hormuz, and also in 1988. In 1990, Charybdis was on Persian Gulf patrol, with several flying the flag visits in the Far East. She was due to visit America and the Falklands in 1991, but was retasked to return to the eastern Mediterranean to act as Sea Wolf protection for the flagship Ark Royal during the first Gulf War.

== Fate ==
In September 1991, Charybdis was decommissioned. She was sunk during a Joint Maritime Course sinking exercise on 11 June 1993 off of the Benbecula Rocket Range in the Western Isles of Scotland.

== Publications ==
- Colledge, J. J.; Warlow, Ben (2006) [1969]. Ships of the Royal Navy: The Complete Record of All Fighting Ships of the Royal Navy from the 15th Century to the Present (3rd Rev ed.). London: Chatham Publishing. ISBN 978-1-86176-281-8. OCLC 67375475.
- Marriott, Leo, 1983. Royal Navy Frigates 1945-1983, Ian Allan Ltd. ISBN 07110 1322 5
