= HMS Salisbury (F32) =

1957 Type 61 or Salisbury class frigate of the Royal Navy

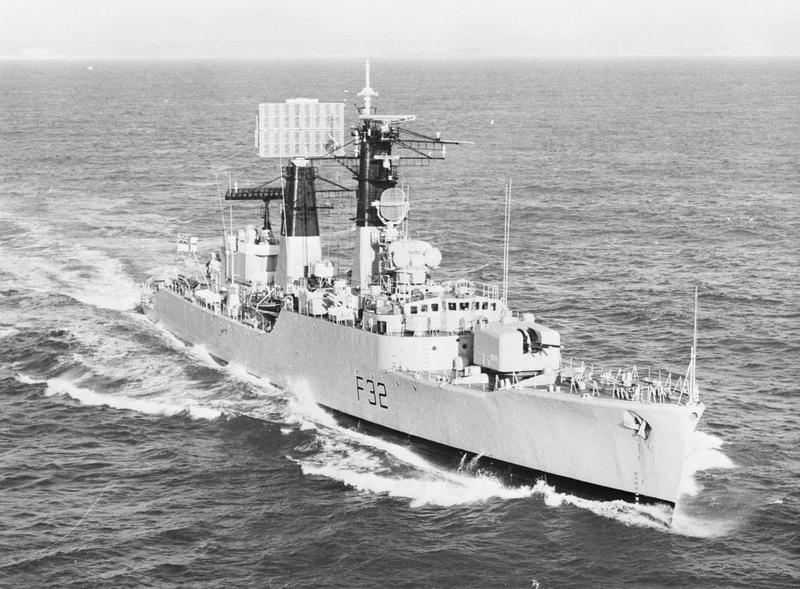
- HMS Salisbury at sea in 1974

History

United Kingdom
- Name: HMS Salisbury
- Builder: Devonport Dockyard
- Laid down: 23 January 1952
- Launched: 25 June 1953
- Completed: 27 February 1957
- Identification: Pennant number F32
- Fate: Sunk as a target 30 September 1985

General characteristics
- Class & type: Salisbury-class frigate
- Displacement: 2,170 tons standard; 2,400 tons full load
- Length: 340 ft (100 m) o/a
- Beam: 40 ft (12 m)
- Draught: 15 ft 6 in (4.72 m)
- Propulsion: 8 × ASR1 diesels, 12,400 shp (9,200 kW), 2 shafts
- Speed: 24 kn (44 km/h)
- Range: 7,500 nmi (13,900 km) at 16 kn (30 km/h)
- Complement: 235
- Sensors & processing systems: Type 960 air search radar, later Type 965 AKE-2; Type 293Q target indication radar, later Type 993 and Antenna AKD; Type 982 aircraft direction radar, laterType 986 and Antenna AKR; Type 277Q height finding radar, later Type 278 and Antenna ANU(3); Type 974 navigation radarlater Type 978 and Antenna ATZ; Type 275 fire control radar on director Mark 6M; Type 262 fire control on STAAG mount; Type 944/954 later Type 1010/1011 Cossor Mark 10 IFF; Type 174 search sonar; Type 170 attack sonar
- Electronic warfare & decoys: UA3J
- Armament: 1 × twin 4.5 in gun Mark 6; 1 × twin 40 mm Bofors gun STAAG Mark 2, later 1 × Sea Cat GWS-20 SAM; 1 × Squid A/S mortar

Service record
- Operations: Beira Patrol (1975); Cod Wars (1976)

HMS Salisbury was a Salisbury-class or Type 61 aircraft direction frigate of the British Royal Navy. Completed in the late 1950s, Salisbury served through the 1960s and 1970s, participating in the Beira Patrol, blockading against Rhodesia and the confrontation with Iceland over fishing rights that was known as the Cod Wars. Salisbury became a harbour training ship in 1980, before being sunk as a target in 1985.

== Design and construction ==
The ship was built at Devonport Dockyard, Plymouth as the lead ship of the class. Salisbury was laid down on 23 January 1952, launched on 25 June 1953, and completed on 27 February 1957.

The Type 61 class were aircraft direction frigates, fitted with a sophisticated battery of radar equipment which was intended to provide guidance to carrier and shore-based aircraft against aerial targets. They shared a common hull design with the Leopard-class frigates, and like the Leopards, were powered by eight Admiralty Standard Range diesel engines driving two shafts, giving a total of 14,400 shaft horsepower (10,700 kW) and propelling the ship to a speed of 24 knots (44 km/h; 28 mph).

== Operational history ==
In July 1958, Salisbury, took part in Operation Fortitude, when the aircraft carrier Eagle supported an airlift of British troops to Jordan following a request by King Hussein of Jordan more military assistance in response to unrest following the formation of the United Arab Republic by Egypt and Syria and the 14 July Revolution in Iraq. In 1959, Salisbury visited Cleveland, Ohio and was first RN warship on Lake Erie since 1812. At that time, she was part of the 5th Frigate Squadron, serving in home waters, in the Mediterranean and in the Far East until August 1961. From 1961 to 1962, she was modernised with an improved radar suite, with Type 965 long-range radar fitted on a plated in Mack aft, replacing the previous Type 960 radar, and with the Type 293 target designation radar moved forward to a new foremast, while improved ESM equipment was also fitted.

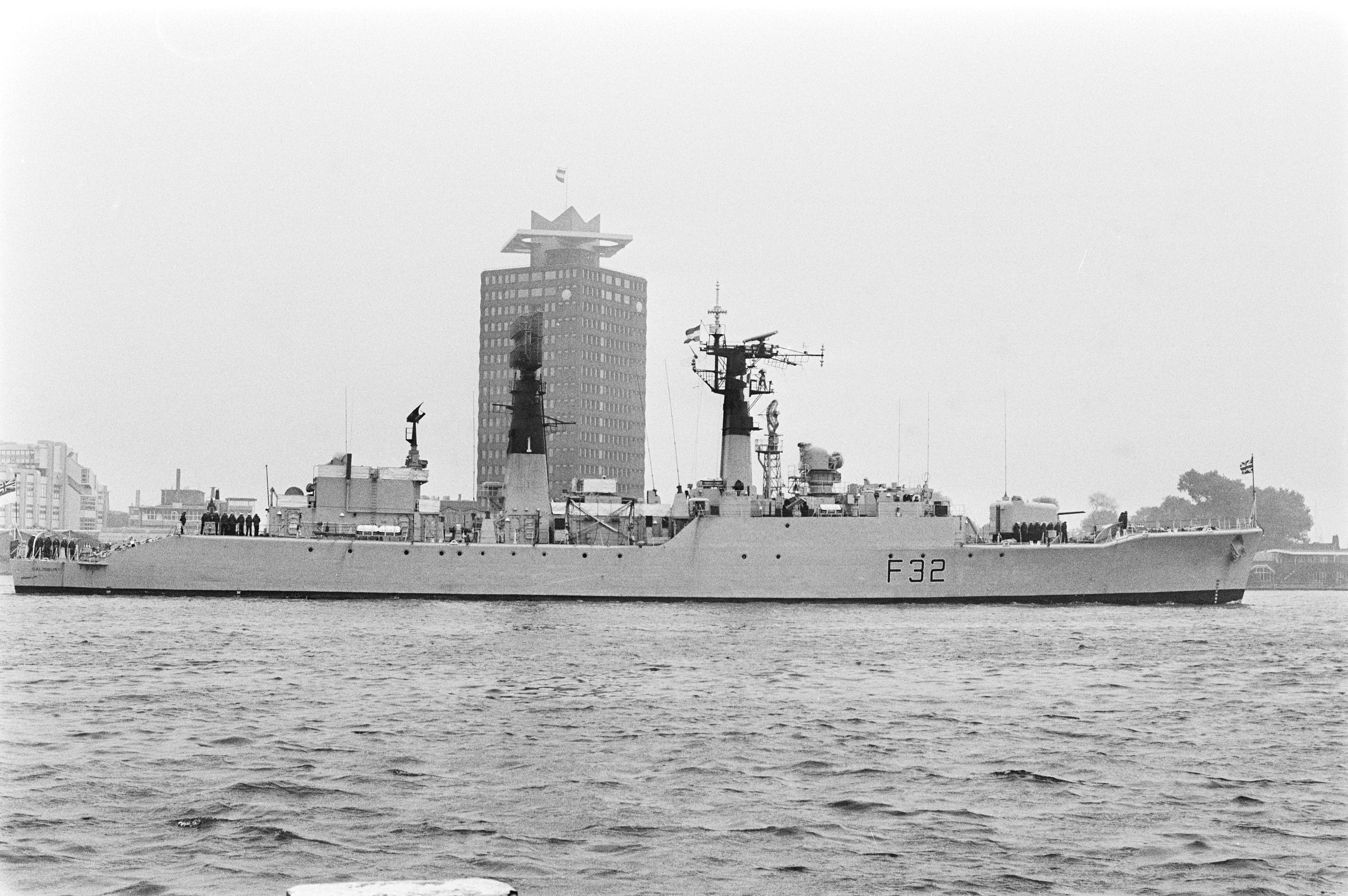
HMS Salisbury in 1976

Following her refit, Salisbury again served in home waters and in the Far East. On 25 June 1964, she sustained a collision with the destroyer Diamond in the English Channel while returning from exercise. Salisbury's commanding officer, Commander William Fitzherbert, was acquitted of negligently hazarding his ship at the subsequent court martial. After repairs, the frigate attended the opening of Forth Road Bridge by Queen Elizabeth II. Salisbury sailed to the Far East where she took part in the Borneo Insurgency in 1963. The vessel's primary role was to ferry Gurkhas into the war zone and supplying manpower to patrol rivers in the ship's boats. Salisbury also patrolled off the coast of East Africa on the Socotra patrols. The frigate found both propellers split and was sent to a floating dock at Singapore for 30 days to fix. In 1967, she stood by during disturbances in the West Indies, being tasked to ferry the local police from St. Kitts and Nevis to the island of Anguilla where there was unrest. In the event the police forces failed to materialise and the ship landed her IS Platoon to restore order. Whilst returning from the West Indies she sank the abandoned German tanker Essberger Chemist which was still afloat following an unsuccessful attempt by the nuclear submarine Dreadnought.

During 1967–70, Salisbury again underwent a major modernisation, with a launcher for Sea Cat surface-to-air missiles replacing the twin Bofors 40 mm gun mount aft. In 1975 she completed the last Beira Patrol. She undertook Cod War patrols in 1976 and was slightly damaged in a collision with the Icelandic gunboat Týr on 1 April 1976, and was involved in two collisions with Ægir on 20 May 1976.

In 1977 Salisbury was part of the 1st Frigate Squadron and took part in the Fleet Review to celebrate Queen Elizabeth II's Silver Jubilee. In 1978, the frigate sailed to the Mediterranean Sea during negotiations for her sale to Egypt, but eventually returned to UK, the sale having fallen through. It appears that Salisbury was returned by Egypt, and not assigned to the stand by squadron with Lincoln, because immediately prior to the transfer the below-deck electronics for the 982 radar, updated to 985/6 with solid state and Moving target indication(MTI), was removed, as with Llandaff prior to transfer to Bangladesh.

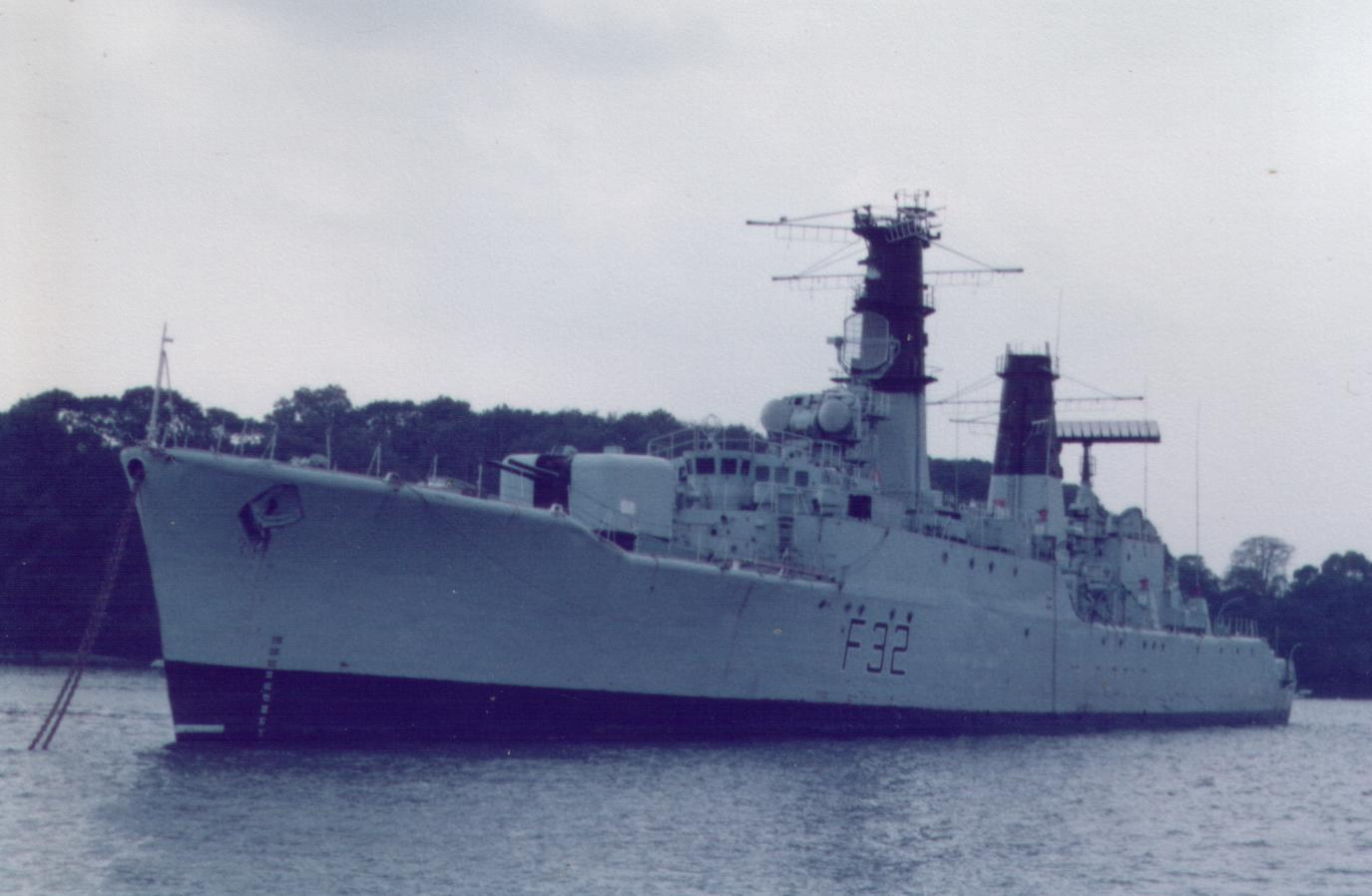
Salisbury while serving as a harbour training ship in 1983.

From 1980–85, she was a harbour training ship at Devonport, before being replaced in that role by the frigate Ajax. On 30 September 1985, Salisbury was towed out and sunk as a target.

== Publications ==
- Blackman, Raymond V. B., ed. (1971). Jane's Fighting Ships 1971–72. London: Sampson Low, Marston & Co. ISBN 0-354-00096-9.
- Colledge, J. J.; Warlow, Ben (2006) [1969]. Ships of the Royal Navy: The Complete Record of All Fighting Ships of the Royal Navy from the 15th Century to the Present (3rd Rev ed.). London: Chatham Publishing. ISBN 978-1-86176-281-8. OCLC 67375475.
- Critchley, Mike (1986). British Warships Since 1945: Part 5: Frigates. Liskeard, UK: Maritime Books. ISBN 0-907771-13-0.
- Gardiner, Robert; Chumbley, Stephen (1995). Conway's All The World's Fighting Ships 1947–1995. Annapolis, Maryland, USA: Naval Institute Press. ISBN 1-55750-132-7.
- Marriott, Leo (1983). Royal Navy Frigates 1945–1983. Shepperton, UK: Ian Allan. ISBN 0-7110-1322-5.
- Roberts, John (2009). Safeguarding the Nation: The Story of the Modern Royal Navy. Annapolis, Maryland, USA: Naval Institute Press. ISBN 978-1-59114-812-8.
