= HMS Coventry =

Six ships of the British Royal Navy and its predecessors have been named Coventry, after the city of Coventry in the West Midlands.

- English ship Coventry (1658) was the Spanish 28-gun ship San Miguel, captured in 1658, but in turn taken by the French in 1666
- HMS Coventry (1695) was a 48-gun fourth-rate ship-of-the-line launched in 1695, captured by the French in 1704 but soon recaptured, and broken up in 1709
- HMS Coventry (1757) was a 28-gun Coventry-class sixth-rate frigate launched in 1757, captured by the French in 1783, and struck in 1786
- HMS Coventry (D43) was a C-class light cruiser launched in 1916 and sunk in an air attack in 1942
- HMS Coventry was intended as a Type 61 frigate that was ordered but then deferred by the 1957 Defence White Paper; when the ship was finally confirmed it was instead built as the Leander-class HMS Penelope (F127)
- HMS Coventry (D118) was a Type 42 destroyer launched in 1974 and lost in the Falklands War
- HMS Coventry (F98) was a Type 22 frigate launched in 1986 and sold to Romania in 2003

== Battle honours ==
- Quiberon Bay 1759
- Trincomalee 1782
- Norway 1940
- Atlantic 1940
- Spartivento 1940
- Greece 1941
- Crete 1941
- Libya 1941
- Mediterranean 1941
- Falklands 1982
