= F61 =

F61 may refer to:

- Farman F.61, a French reconnaissance aircraft
- HMS Javelin (F61), a J-class destroyer of the Royal Navy
- HMS Llandaff (F61), a Salisbury-class frigate of the Royal Navy
- HMS Pretoria Castle (F61) an ocean liner requisitioned for the Royal Navy
- Northrop F-61 Black Widow, an American fighter aircraft
