= F32 =

F32, F.32 or F-32 may refer to:

- BMW 4 Series (F32), a car
- F-32 (Michigan county highway)
- Fokker F.32, a 1929 Dutch passenger aircraft
- HMS Salisbury (F32), a 1953 British Royal Navy aircraft direction frigate
- .f32 Raw image format, used by OpenSimulator for importing & exporting terrain
- Depressive episode ICD-10 code
- F32/T32 classification in paralympic sports
- Single-precision floating-point format, as it's known by its type annotation f32 in Rust.
