= Mack (naval architecture) =

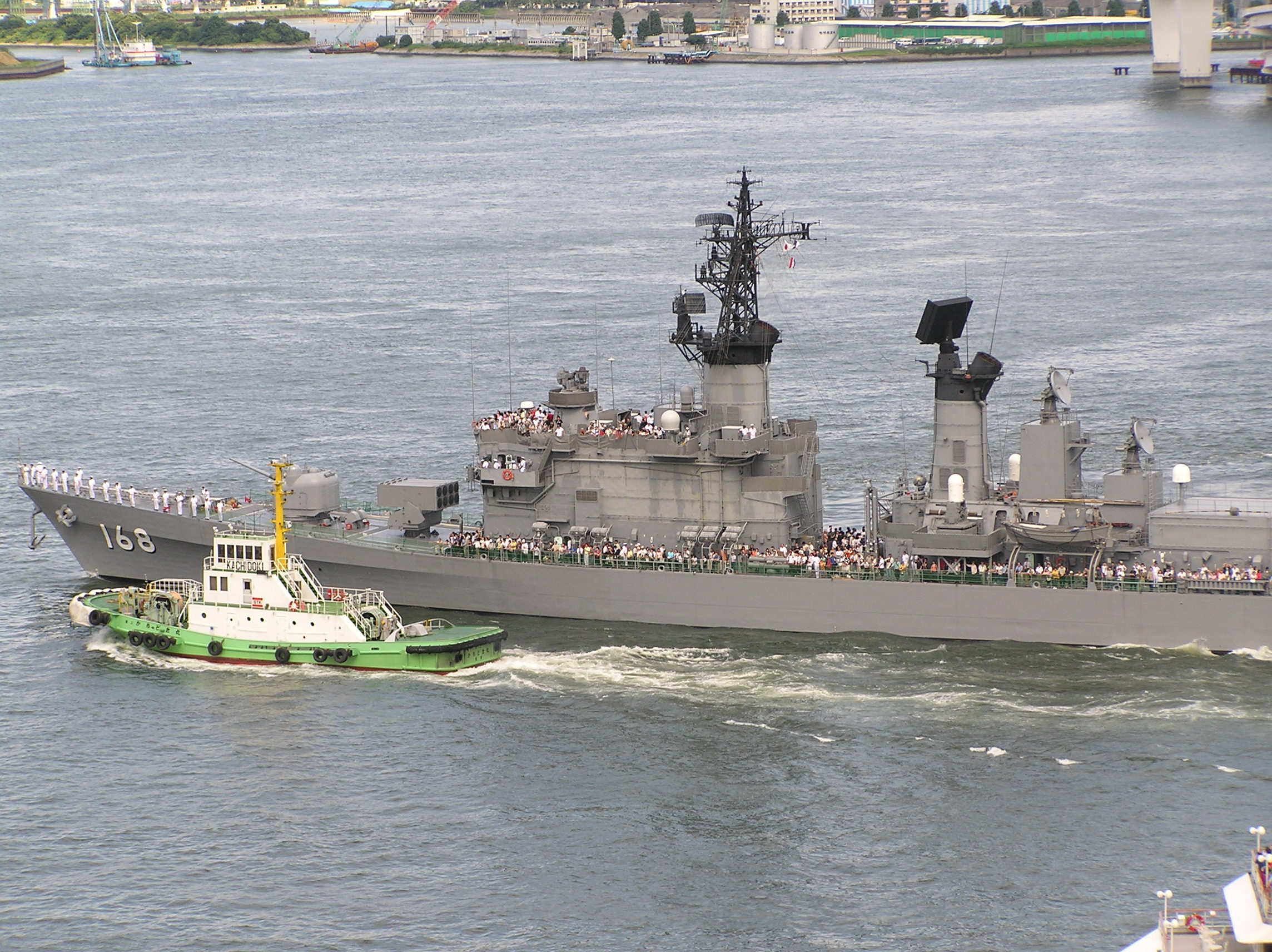
Tachikaze-class destroyer (1973) JS Tachikaze

In naval architecture, a mack is a structure which combines the radar masts and the exhaust stack of a surface ship, thereby saving the upper deck space used for separate funnels and the increasingly large tripod masts used to carry heavy radar aerials. The word is a composite (portmanteau) of "mast" and "stack". It is a common design feature on post-World War II warships (e.g. the rebuilt Baltimore-class cruisers) and on some cruise ships.

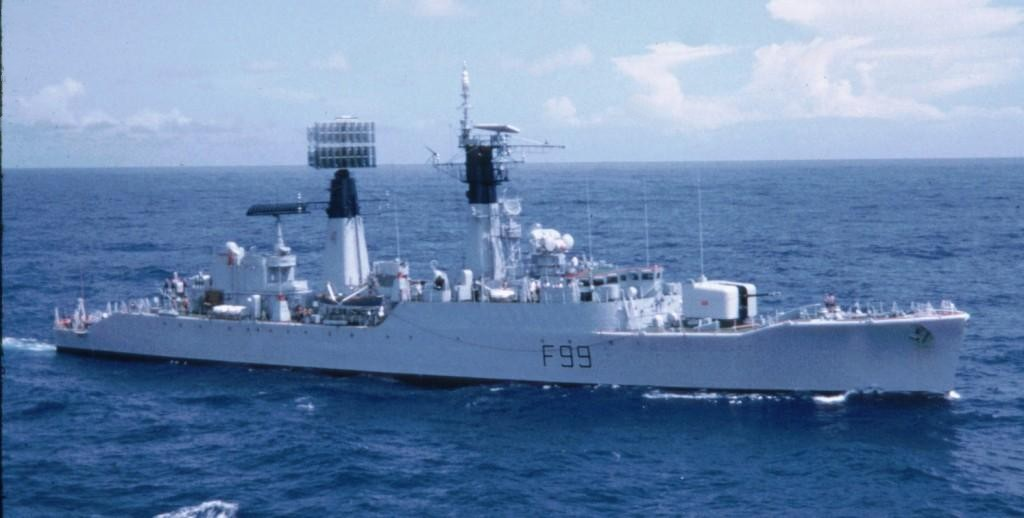
HMS Lincoln (1959)

The French Navy (Marine Nationale) used a combined exhaust stack and rear director mast on the Richelieu-class battleships in the late 1930s. The Royal Navy used this design feature on the 1944 Weapon-class destroyers and the subsequent Daring-class destroyers, and in the diesel-engined Type 41 "Cat" class and Type 61 "Cathedral" class frigates of the 1950s. It provided unbalanced and unattractive designs, which led to a reversion to separate masts and funnels in subsequent RN vessels.

The close proximity of exhaust fumes to delicate radio and radar equipment led to corrosion problems, making macks unpopular for later designs.
