= HMS Chichester (F59) =

1958 Type 61 or Salisbury class frigate of the Royal Navy

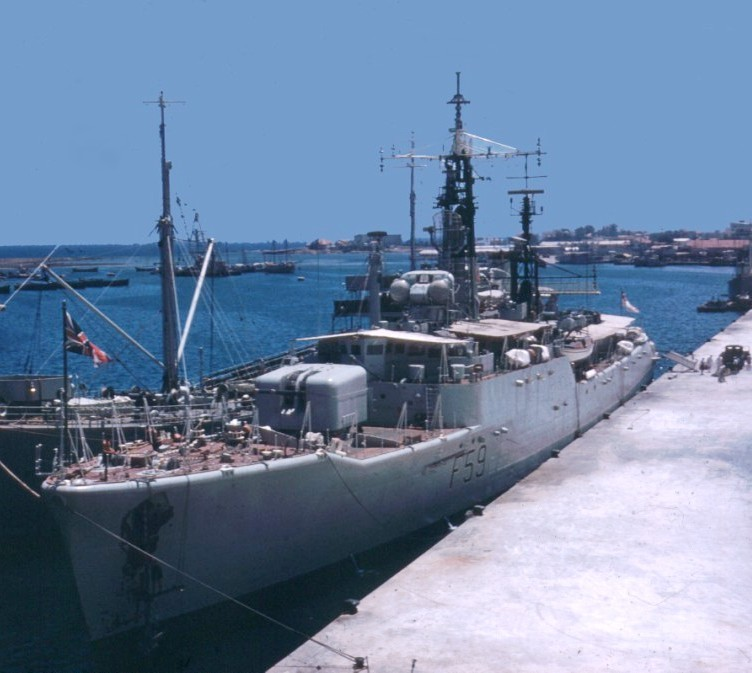
- HMS Chichester at Famagusta, 1960

History

United Kingdom
- Name: HMS Chichester
- Ordered: 28 June 1951
- Builder: Fairfields
- Laid down: 26 June 1953
- Launched: 21 April 1955
- Commissioned: 16 May 1958
- Identification: Pennant number F59
- Fate: Sold for breaking 17 March 1981

General characteristics
- Class & type: Salisbury-class frigate
- Displacement: 2,170 tons standard; 2,400 tons full load
- Length: 340 ft (100 m) o/a
- Beam: 40 ft (12 m)
- Draught: 15 ft 6 in (4.72 m)
- Propulsion: 8 × ASR1 diesels, 12,400 shp (9,200 kW), 2 shafts
- Speed: 24 kn (44 km/h)
- Range: 7,500 nmi (13,900 km) at 16 kn (30 km/h)
- Complement: 235
- Sensors & processing systems: Type 960 air search radar, later Type 965 AKE-2; Type 293Q target indication radar, later Type 993n; Type 982 aircraft direction radar, laterType 986; Type 277Q height finding radar, later Type 278; Type 974 navigation radarlater Type 978; Type 275 fire control radar on director Mark 6M; Type 262 fire control on STAAG mount; Type 1010 Cossor Mark 10 IFF; Type 174 search sonar; Type 170 attack sonar
- Armament: 1 × twin 4.5 in gun Mark 6; 1 × twin 40 mm Bofors gun STAAG Mark 2, later 1 × twin 40 mm Bofors gun Mk.5; 1 × Squid A/S mortar

HMS Chichester was a Salisbury-class or Type 61 aircraft direction frigate of the British Royal Navy.

== Construction and design ==
The Salisbury-class, or Type 61, frigates were designed for a main role of providing long-range radar cover for convoys and to direct aircraft protecting the convoys. While they would be fitted with powerful radars and communications equipment and the crew to operate it, high speed would not be required. They shared a common hull and machinery with the Leopard-class (or Type 41) anti-aircraft frigates.

Chichester was 339 ft 10 1/2 in (103.59 m) long overall, 330 ft 0 in (100.58 m) at the waterline and 320 ft 0 in (97.54 m) length between perpendiculars, with a Beam of 40 ft 0 in (12.19 m) and a draught of 11 ft 6 1/2 in (3.52 m). Displacement was 2,170 long tons (2,200 t) standard and 2,408 long tons (2,447 t) deep load. She was powered by eight Admiralty Standard Range 1 (ASR1) diesel engines, with a total power of 14,400 brake horsepower (10,700 kW), driving two propeller shafts giving a speed of 25 knots (46 km/h; 29 mph). Four more of these engines were used to generate electricity, driving 500 kW alternators. Exhausts for the diesels were routed through the ship's lattice foremast and mainmast. The ship had a range of 2,300 nmi (2,600 mi; 4,300 km) at full power and 7,500 nmi (8,600 mi; 13,900 km) at 16 kn (18 mph; 30 km/h).

The ship's main gun armament consisted of one twin 4.5 inch (113 mm) Mark 6 dual-purpose gun turret, mounted forward, with a STAAG twin stabilised 40mm Bofors mount providing close-in anti-aircraft defence, although this mounting was unreliable and later replaced by a simpler Mk.V twin Bofors mount. A single Squid anti submarine mortar was fitted. The ship's lattice foremast carried direction finding and VHF/UHF communications aerials, together with a Type 268 navigation radar, with a Type 277 air/surface warning and height finding radar mounted on a short lattice mast immediately forward of the foremast. The ship's mainmast carried a Type 960 long-range air warning radar and a Type 293Q target designation radar, while a Type 982 aircraft direction radar was fitted on a deckhouse aft. The ship's sonar fit consisted of Type 174 search, Type 170 fire control sonar for Squid and a Type 162 sonar for classifying targets on the sea floor. As built, the ship and a complement of 207 officers and other ranks.

Chichester was laid down at Fairfield Shipbuilding and Engineering Company's Govan shipyard on 26 June 1953, as Yard number 771. She was launched on 21 April 1955 by Elizabeth Douglas-Home, wife of Alec Douglas-Home, and was completed on 16 May 1958.

== Service ==
Chichester was first commissioned in 1958, joining the 4th Frigate Squadron, which alternated between duties in Home waters and the Far East. On 10 September 1958, Chichester rescued the crew of the coaster Concha, which had caught fire off Milford Haven after an explosion in her engine room. The frigate put a firefighting party aboard the blazing coaster, but despite these efforts the fire could not be contained and Concha sank while under tow by the tug Sheila. On 2 November 1958, Chichester, together with the cruiser Ceylon and the frigate Loch Fyne embarked British troops from Aqaba, Jordan. The troops had been deployed to Jordan earlier in the year following a request by King Hussain of Jordan due to instability in the Middle East following the establishment of the United Arab Republic and the overthrow of the Iraqi monarchy. The commission took her through the Mediterranean to the Far East returning via South Africa and South America. In 1963–4 she was refitted in Chatham with macks (masts and stacks) along with type 965 & 993 radar. In 1968 she deployed for Fishery Protection duties and was accused by the Soviet Union of spying on Soviet naval exercises. During December 1969, Chichester was deployed on the Beira Patrol, attempting to stop the supply of oil to Rhodesia via the Mozambique port of Beira.

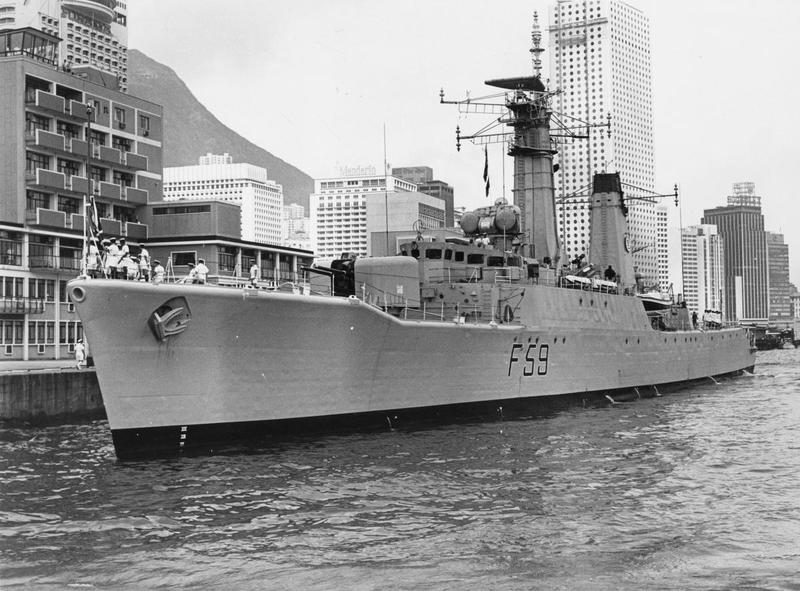
HMS Chichester at Hong Kong in 1973 (IWM)

Towards the end of her career, in 1971, the Type 61 frigate was refitted as a Hong Kong guard ship, to replace an ageing Type 12 frigate believed to be HMS Whitby, due in part to her good range conferred by her diesel machinery. Her radar fit was reduced to radar 978, 993M and the 275, Mk 6 director for the twin 4.5 and a more suitable light arms for patrol off Hong Kong of two single 20mm guns and a single 40mm Bofors.

The election of the Labour Government in 1974 saw a further reduction of naval forces, east of Suez with the frigate being supplemented by five Ton Class minesweepers converted for Patrol duties, as the largest vessels maintaining a presence for protection of British interests. Chichester left Hong Kong in the spring of 1976 to return to the UK, via Port Stanley in the Falkland Islands in response to RRS Shackleton being fired on by the Argentine destroyer ARA Almirante Storni.

Following decommissioning Chichester arrived for scrapping at Queenborough on 17 March 1981.

== Bibliography ==
- Blackman, Raymond V.B. (1971). Jane's Fighting Ships 1971–72. London: Sampson Low, Marston & Co., Ltd. ISBN 0-354-00096-9.
- Colledge, J. J.; Warlow, Ben (2006) [1969]. Ships of the Royal Navy: The Complete Record of All Fighting Ships of the Royal Navy from the 15th Century to the Present (3rd Rev ed.). London: Chatham Publishing. ISBN 978-1-86176-281-8. OCLC 67375475.
- Critchley, Mike (1992). British Warships Since 1945: Part 5: Frigates. Liskeard, UK: Maritime Press. ISBN 0-907771-13-0.
- Friedman, Norman (2008). British Destroyers & Frigates: The Second World War and After. Barnsley, UK: Seaforth Publishing. ISBN 978-1-84832-015-4.
- Gardiner, Robert; Chumbley, Stephen, eds. (1995). Conway's All The World's Fighting Ships 1947–1995. Annapolis, Maryland, USA: Naval Institute Press. ISBN 1-55750-132-7.
- Marriott, Leo (1983). Royal Navy Frigates 1945–1983. Shepperton, UK: Ian Allan. ISBN 0-7110-1322-5.
- Roberts, John (2009). Safeguarding the Nation: The Story of the Modern Royal Navy. Annapolis, Maryland, US: Naval Institute Press. ISBN 978-1-59114-812-8.
