= F59 =

F59 may refer to:

- EMD F59PH, a locomotive
- HMNZS Monowai (F59), an armed merchant cruiser of the Royal New Zealand Navy
- HMS Chichester (F59), a Salisbury-class frigate of the Royal Navy
- HMS Mashona (F59), a Tribal-class destroyer of the Royal Navy
