= HMS Gloucester =

Eleven vessels, and one planned, of the British Royal Navy have been named HMS Gloucester, after Gloucester, the city in England.

- English ship Gloucester (1654) (also Glocester) was a 54-gun ship launched in 1654 and wrecked in 1682 off Great Yarmouth.
- HMS Gloucester (1695) was a 60-gun fourth rate launched in 1695, on harbour service after 1706, and broken up in 1731.
- HMS Gloucester (1709) was a 60-gun fourth rate launched in July 1709 and captured by the French in October of the same year.
- HMS Gloucester (1711) was a 50-gun fourth rate in service from 1711 to 1724.
- HMS Gloucester (1737) was a 50-gun fourth rate launched in 1737 and burned in 1742 to forestall capture.
- HMS Gloucester (1745) was a 50-gun fourth rate in service from 1745 to 1764.
- HMS Gloucester (1812) was a 74-gun third rate launched in 1812 and sold 1884.
- HMS Gloucester (1909) was a Town-class light cruiser in service from 1909 to 1921.
- HMS Gloucester (C62) was a Town-class cruiser launched in 1937 and sunk off Crete in 1941. The wreck site is a protected place under the Protection of Military Remains Act.
- HMS Gloucester was intended as a Type 61 frigate, and was ordered from Portsmouth Dockyard in 1956 but later cancelled.
- HMS Gloucester (D96) was a Type 42 destroyer launched in 1982, commissioned in September 1985, and retired from service on 30 June 2011.

Additionally, a 10-gun brig named HMS Duke of Gloucester was launched on Lake Erie in 1807, captured by the Americans in April 1813 and destroyed by the British a few weeks later.

== Battle honours ==
- Lowestoft 1665
- Four Days' Battle 1666
- Orfordness 1666
- Sole Bay 1672
- Schooneveld 1673
- Battle of Texel 1673
- Marbella 1705
- Ushant 1747
- Jutland 1916
- Calabria 1940
- Matapan 1941
- Crete 1941
- Malta Convoys 1941
- Mediterranean 1941
- Kuwait 1991
