= Wiesbaden-class cruiser =

Class of light cruisers of the German Imperial Navy

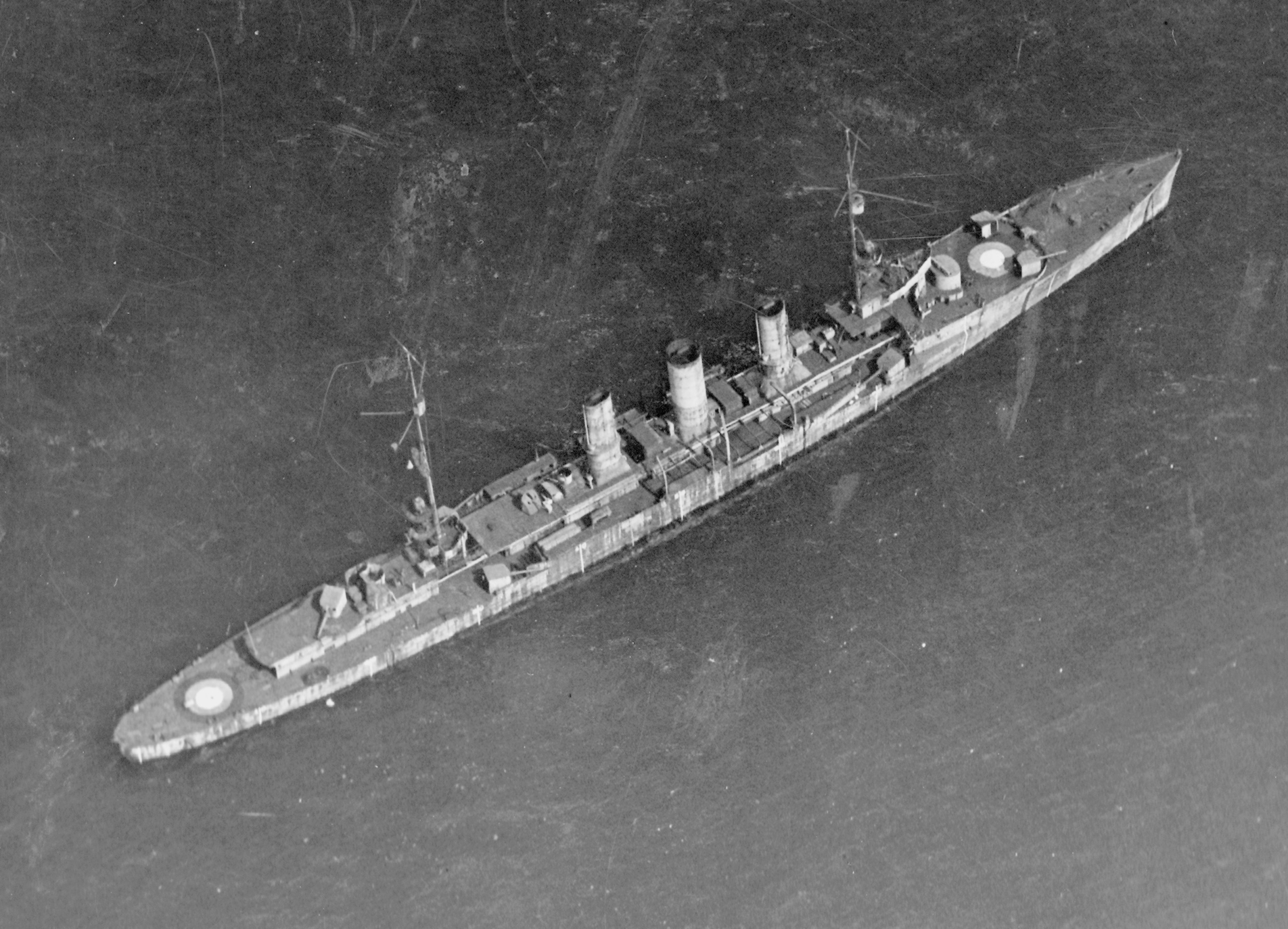
- SMS Frankfurt as a bombing target in 1921

Class overview
- Name: Wiesbaden class
- Builders: AG Vulcan Stettin; Kaiserliche Werft Kiel
- Operators: Imperial German Navy
- Preceded by: Pillau class
- Succeeded by: Königsberg class
- Completed: 2
- Lost: 2

General characteristics
- Type: Light cruiser
- Displacement: Normal: 5,180 t (5,100 long tons); Full load: 6,601 t (6,497 long tons)
- Length: 145.30 m (476 ft 8 in)
- Beam: 13.90 m (45 ft 7 in)
- Draft: 5.76 m (18 ft 11 in)
- Installed power: 12 × water-tube boilers; 31,000 shp (23,000 kW)
- Propulsion: 2 × steam turbines; 2 × screw propellers
- Speed: 27.5 knots (50.9 km/h; 31.6 mph)
- Range: 4,800 nmi (8,900 km; 5,500 mi) at 12 knots (22 km/h; 14 mph)
- Crew: 17 officers; 457 enlisted
- Armament: 8 × 15 cm (5.9 in) SK L/45 guns; 2 × 8.8 cm (3.5 in) SK L/45 guns; 4 × 50 cm (19.7 in) torpedo tubes; 120 mines
- Armor: Belt: 60 mm (2.4 in); Deck: 60 mm; Conning tower: 100 mm (3.9 in)

The Wiesbaden class of light cruisers was a class of ships built by the German Kaiserliche Marine (Imperial Navy) shortly before the outbreak of World War I. Two ships were built in this class, Wiesbaden and Frankfurt. They were very similar to the preceding design, the Graudenz class, though they were armed with eight 15 cm SK L/45 guns instead of the twelve 10.5 cm SK L/45 guns on the earlier vessels. The ships had a top speed of 27.5 knots (50.9 km/h; 31.6 mph).

Wiesbaden saw only one major action, the Battle of Jutland, on 31 May – 1 June 1916. She was badly damaged and immobilized during the battle and became the center of a melee as both sides fought over the crippled ship. She eventually sank in the early morning hours of 1 June, with only one survivor. Frankfurt was only lightly damaged at Jutland and saw extensive service with the II Scouting Group, including during Operation Albion against the Russians in the Baltic and at the Second Battle of Heligoland Bight, both in 1917. She was interned with the rest of the fleet at the end of the war and scuttled at Scapa Flow, though British sailors prevented her from sinking. Frankfurt was ceded to the US Navy as a war prize and eventually expended as a target in July 1921.

== Design ==
=== Dimensions and machinery ===
The ships were 141.70 meters (464 ft 11 in) long at the waterline and 145.30 m (476 ft 8 in) long overall. They had a beam of 13.90 m (45 ft 7 in) and a draft of 5.76 m (18 ft 11 in) forward and 6.06 m (19 ft 11 in) aft. They displaced 5,180 metric tons (5,100 long tons) as designed and 6,601 t (6,497 long tons) at full load. The hull were built with longitudinal steel frames and contained seventeen watertight compartments and a double bottom that extended for forty-seven percent of the length of the keel. Steering was controlled by a single rudder. Wiesbaden and Frankfurt had a crew of 17 officers and 457 enlisted men. They carried a number of smaller craft, including one picket boat, one barge, one cutter, two yawls, and two dinghies.

Their propulsion systems consisted of two sets of Marine steam turbines driving two 3.5-meter (11 ft) screw propellers. They were designed to give 31,000 shaft horsepower (23,000 kW). These were powered by ten coal-fired Marine-type water-tube boilers and two oil-fired double-ended boilers. These gave the ship a top speed of 27.5 knots (50.9 km/h; 31.6 mph). The ships of the class carried 1,280 metric tons (1,260 long tons; 1,410 short tons) of coal, and an additional 470 metric tons (460 long tons; 520 short tons) of oil that gave them a range of 4,800 nautical miles (8,900 km; 5,500 mi) at 12 knots (22 km/h; 14 mph). At 25 knots (46 km/h; 29 mph), the cruising radius dropped significantly, to 1,200 nmi (2,200 km; 1,400 mi). Wiesbaden was equipped with a pair of turbo generators and one diesel generator rated at a combined 300 kilowatts (400 hp) at 220 Volts. Frankfurt only had the two turbo generators, which provided 240 kW (320 hp).

=== Armament and armor ===
The ships of the Wiesbaden class were armed with a main battery of eight 15 cm (5.9 in) SK L/45 guns in single pedestal mounts. Two were placed side by side forward on the forecastle, four were located amidships, two on either side, and two were placed in a superfiring pair aft. The guns could engage targets out to 17,600 m (19,200 yd). They were supplied with 1,024 rounds of ammunition, for 128 shells per gun. The ships' antiaircraft armament initially consisted of four 5.2 cm (2 in) L/55 guns, though these were replaced with a pair of 8.8 cm (3.5 in) SK L/45 anti-aircraft guns. The ships were also equipped with four 50 cm (19.7 in) torpedo tubes with eight torpedoes. Two were submerged in the hull on the broadside and two were mounted on the upper deck amidships. They could also carry 120 mines.

Wiesbaden and Frankfurt were protected by a waterline armored belt that was 60 mm (2.4 in) thick amidships; the belt was reduced to 18 mm (0.71 in) forward. The stern was not armored. The conning tower had 100 mm (3.9 in) thick sides and a 20 mm (0.79 in) thick roof. The rangefinder atop the conning tower had 30 mm (1.2 in) worth of armor protection. The deck was covered with 60 mm thick armor plate forward, 40 mm (1.6 in) amidships, and 20 mm aft. Sloped armor 40 mm thick connected the deck to the belt armor. The main battery gun shields were 50 mm (2 in) thick.

== Service history ==
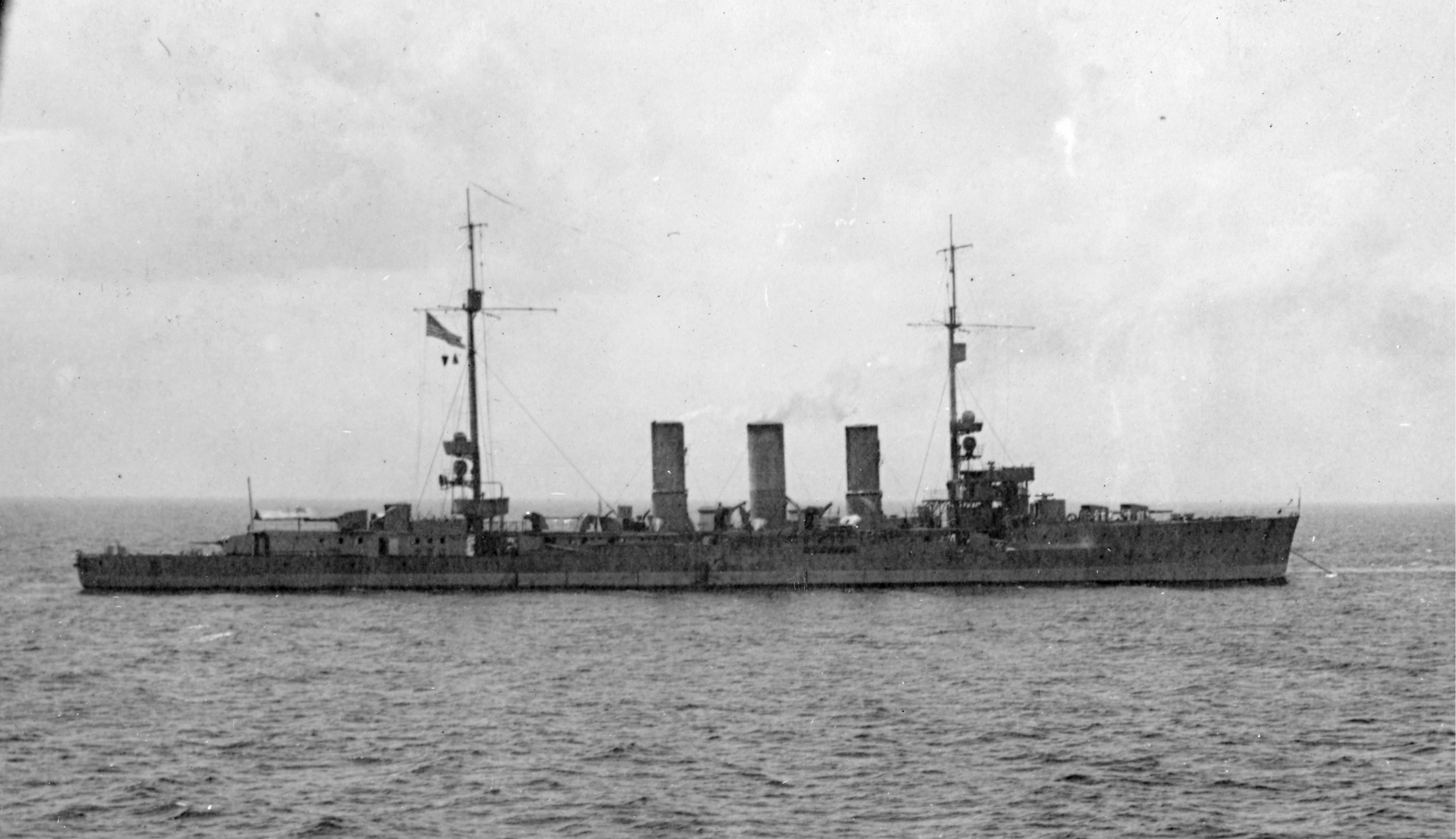
Frankfurt under the US flag after the war

=== Wiesbaden ===
Wiesbaden' was ordered under the contract name "Ersatz Gefion" and was laid down at the AG Vulcan shipyard in Stettin in 1913 and launched on 20 January 1915, after which fitting-out work commenced. She was commissioned into the High Seas Fleet on 23 August 1915, after being rushed through trials. The ship saw only one major action, the Battle of Jutland on 31 May – 1 June 1916. The ship was badly damaged by gunfire from the battlecruiser HMS Invincible. Immobilized between the two battle fleets, Wiesbaden became the center of a hard-fought action that saw the destruction of two British armored cruisers. Heavy fire from the British fleet prevented evacuation of the ship's crew. Wiesbaden remained afloat until the early hours of 1 June and sank sometime between 01:45 and 02:45. Only one crew member survived the sinking; the wreck was located by German Navy divers in 1983.

=== Frankfurt ===
Frankfurt was ordered under the contract name "Ersatz Hela" and was laid down at the Kaiserliche Werft shipyard in Kiel in 1913 and launched on 20 March 1915. The ships was commissioned into the High Seas Fleet on 20 August 1915. Frankfurt saw extensive action with the High Seas Fleet during World War I. She served primarily in the North Sea, and participated in the Bombardment of Yarmouth and Lowestoft and the battles of Jutland and Second Heligoland. At Jutland, she was lightly damaged by a British cruiser and her crew suffered minor casualties. The ship was also present during Operation Albion in the Baltic Sea in October 1917. At the end of the war, she was interned with the bulk of the German fleet in Scapa Flow. When the fleet was scuttled in June 1919, Frankfurt was one of the few ships that were not successfully sunk. She was ceded to the US Navy as a war prize and ultimately expended as a bomb target in tests conducted by the US Navy and Army Air Force in July 1921.
