= Salisbury-class frigate =

Class of frigate of the Royal Navy

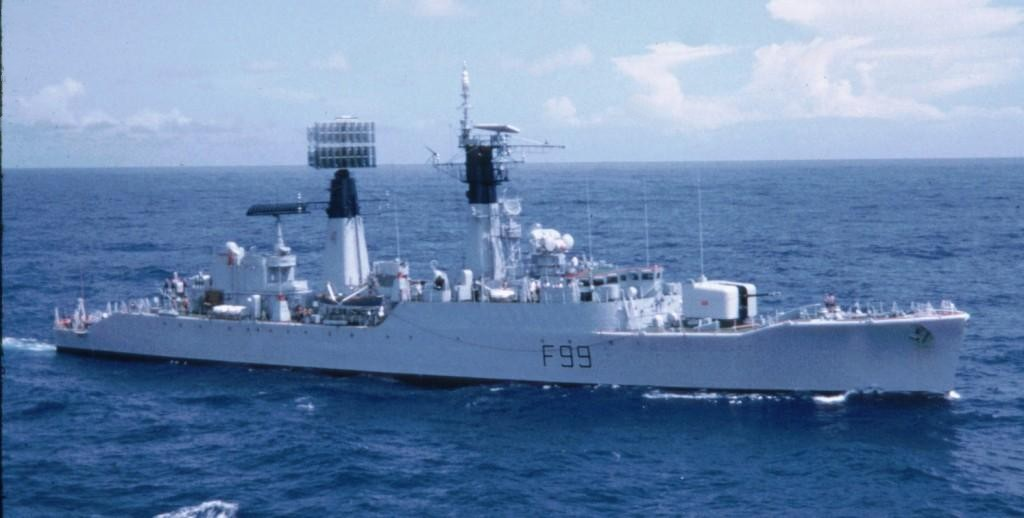
- HMS Lincoln, 1972

Class overview
- Name: Salisbury class
- Operators: Royal Navy; Bangladesh Navy
- Succeeded by: Leander class
- Built: 1952–1959
- In commission: 1957–1985 (British service); 1978–2016 (Bangladesh service)
- Planned: 7
- Completed: 4
- Cancelled: 3
- Retired: 4

General characteristics
- Type: Frigate
- Displacement: 2,170 tons standard; 2,400 tons full load
- Length: 340 ft (100 m) o/a
- Beam: 40 ft (12 m)
- Draught: 15 ft 6 in (4.72 m)
- Propulsion: 8 × Admiralty Standard Range ASR1 diesels, 14,400 shp (10,738 kW), 2 shafts; 220 tons fuel oil
- Speed: 24 kn (44 km/h)
- Range: 7,500 nmi (13,900 km) at 16 kn (30 km/h)
- Complement: 235
- Sensors & processing systems: Type 960 air search radar, later Type 965 AKE-2; Type 293Q target indication radar, later Type 993n; Type 982 aircraft direction radar, later Type 986; Type 277Q height finding radar, later Type 278; Type 974 navigation radar, later Type 978; Type 275 fire control radar on director Mark 6M; Type 262 fire control on STAAG mount; Type 1010 Cossor Mark 10 IFF; Type 174 search sonar; Type 170 attack sonar
- Armament: 1 × twin 4.5-inch (113 mm) gun Mark 6; 1 × twin 40 mm Bofors gun STAAG Mark 2, later; 1 × twin 40 mm Bofors gun Mk.5; Llandaff & Chichester; 1 × Sea Cat GWS-20 SAM; Lincoln & Salisbury; 1 × Squid A/S mortar

The Type 61 Salisbury class was a class of the Royal Navy aircraft direction (AD) frigate, built in the 1950s. The purpose of the aircraft direction ships was to provide radar picket duties at some distance from a carrier task force and offer interception guidance to aircraft operating in their area.

The class was part of a multi-purpose frigate concept that also included the Type 41 Leopard-class anti-aircraft ships and the cancelled Type 11 anti-submarine variant. Together, they were the first ships in the Royal Navy to use diesel propulsion. Improvements in conventional steam turbine power erased the range advantage of the diesel and led to future purchases of Type 61 and 41 being cancelled or converted to the new Type 12 frigate.

== Design ==
The Salisbury class frigates were conceived as part of the 1944 project for common-hull diesel-powered 1700-ton anti-submarine (A/S), air-warfare (AW) and aircraft direction (AD) vessels. The first two prototypes were ordered in the late 1945 construction programme and were built as HMS Salisbury and a second diesel, HMS Leopard (T41) as a suitable A/S frigate or sloop prototype could not proceed at the time. By 1947 the legend (i.e.: the complete plan of the RN warship, delivered to the shipyard to start building) of the Type 61 AD frigates and its sister Type 41 AW light destroyer were complete.

The design of the new air defence frigates could proceed faster as the requirements were clearer and less complex and fuel-efficient diesel power was adequate for convoy escort picket ships. Destroyers could be converted for faster picket duties with carrier task forces. The design of new anti-submarine frigates was delayed due to the expectation that the Soviet Union would build submarines that were much faster underwater, based on the German Type XXI and Type XXIII submarines, which operated at 12–16 knots underwater and hydrogen peroxide (HP) powered submarines running at 22–25 knots submerged. This led the navy to revert to steam turbines and the slower evolution of the Type 12 variant. Steam turbines provided the quietness and speed desirable for anti-submarine applications. However, the design of efficient powerful steam turbines for affordable common hulled anti-sub frigates with the range to escort Atlantic convoys and speed to screen carrier task forces took years and was never entirely achieved.

Neither the Dido-class cruisers nor the Daring-class destroyers had the space required to combine the processing of radar and communications with dual-purpose AA guns. This integration was complicated, making the new diesel air warning and aircraft direction frigates an even higher priority. The legend of the lead Type 12 anti-submarine frigate was not drawn until 1950 as a steam version of the diesel Type 61. The original steam Type 11 frigate concept was abandoned in 1945 and was never designed.

The Type 61 was the first of the new generation frigates laid down in 1951. Without the second Mk 6 4.5-inch gun turret of the Type 41, the Type 61 had 100 tons extra capacity for fuel and the longest range of the frigate variants, 5000 nm at 15 knots compared with 4,500 nm for the Type 41 or the official 12k. The range of the steam-powered Type 12 was only 2500–3000 nm at 14 knots. It was seen as much more important than the related Type 41 (Leopard-class) frigates, but with reduced armament (one twin 4.5-inch mount instead of two) to make way for more aircraft direction equipment. The Type 61 carried the 200 km (120 mi) range Type 982 rake Air Warning radar and Type 277M search and height finder in addition to the radars on the Type 41 but the two additional systems added only 23 tons compared with the saving of 115 tons by excluding the second 4.5-inch turret. The Type 61 was later refitted with the high mounted (four-ton) antenna of the Type 965 (AKE-2) radar. The aircraft direction and air-warning frigates provided extra stations to the aircraft carriers to track incoming air attacks, and direct and communicate with defensive Royal Navy and land-based fighters. The AD cruisers were used in Operation Musketeer during the 1956 Suez Crisis; Hawker Sea Hawk ground attack and English Electric Canberra and Vickers Valiant bomber aircraft struck land air bases and other targets. Directing carrier-based air interception and strike operations was far more important than the "little cat" Type 41s or "big cat", Tiger-class cruiser's guns.

In the mid-1950s, the Royal Navy was largely operating small light fleet carriers and first-generation jets which could take off from slow-moving carriers. In 1960, a second flotilla of four extra Type 61 AD frigates was planned. However, by 1961–62 the big carrier HMS Ark Royal's problems were debugged, the reconstructed small carriers HMS Victorious and HMS Hermes came into effective service with second-generation de Havilland Sea Vixens and Supermarine Scimitar aircraft and the navy's best carrier – HMS Eagle – was being reconstructed. Only the four Battle-class AD conversions were suitable as fast carrier pickets, as the Type 61's diesel power plant lacked the speed for operations with fast carrier groups.

In 1962, orders for extra Type 61s were cancelled, long after the second flotilla of Type 41s was abandoned in 1955–1957, and a 2,000-ton 'East Coast convoy' Type 42 frigate (a 25-knot derivative of the T41/61 diesel hull with 3/N5 4-inch automatic Vickers guns with 2/4 MR3 DCT and 40mm the T42 (1955) was a pocket RN diesel version of Chile's Vickers-built Almirante-class destroyers) was cancelled with the 1957 Defence White Paper. The role of the Type 61 was as a seaworthy air-ocean surveillance ship and air-control ship to escort slow task forces, such as amphibious warfare task forces. In the 1960s the Type 61s were still seen as important units and their modernisation was much more substantial than that of the Type 41. The election of another Labour Government in 1974 threatened to bring the Type 61 service life to a premature end and the two frigates still deployed East of Suez in January 1976, Chichester was struck and Llandaff was sold to Bangladesh by the end of 1976. The Seacat missile-fitted Type 61s had a life extension in 1976, due to the Cod War confrontations with Iceland. HMS Jaguar (a Type 41) and Lincoln were refitted as specialised rammers with a reinforced bow to present a higher-level threat to Icelandic gunboats. The stronger UK/RN stand led to settlement of the Third Cod war before Lincoln finished its trials. With the expanded 200-mile offshore zones, partly stemming from the Cod Wars, Lincoln remained in commission to late 1977 on deep water patrol. The possibility of a new generation of diesel-electric anti-submarine Type 23 frigates resulted in Lincoln being refitted in 1978 to NATO operational frigate standard, to test certain hull characteristics and silencing of diesel electric engines relative to passive sonar operation.

The primary aircraft direction equipment fitted to the Type 61s was initially the Type 960 radar for aircraft warning and Type 982M radar for a degree of 3D cover and better air control over land. The Type 960 radar was replaced by Type 965P at refit for Salisbury (1961–1962), Chichester (1963–1964), Llandaff (1964–1966) and Lincoln (1966–1968).

The Type 965 (AKE-2), had a large "double bedstead" antenna, while the Type 982M radar had a smaller "hayrake" antenna. The Seacat missile system was fitted to Lincoln in a long refit from 1966 to 1968 and in Salisbury from 1967 to 1970. It was the same GWS 20 optically guided system being refitted at the time to the Rothesay-class frigates. Llandaff continued to carry the twin MK 5 40 mm Bofors until sold to Bangladesh. In the late 1960s Lincoln, Salisbury, Llandaff and the aircraft carriers Ark Royal and Bulwark were all refitted with the new Type 986 radar using the 982 antenna, as a partial substitute for the 984 3D radar capability lost with the phaseout of the strike carriers.

The Type 986 radar was intended to partially replace one of the roles of 984, giving more accurate, short-range definition of closing air targets to 120 kilometres (75 mi). It was only a partial replacement, as it lacked the 984 system's ability to rank and prioritize large numbers of targets for interrogation and air interception. The 965 twin array radar was limited and obsolete by the 1970s.

In 1973, HMS Chichester was downgraded to Hong Kong guardship with a reduced gun armament of twin 4.5-inch; one 40 mm and two 20 mm and the air surveillance radars were removed. HMS Lincoln was seriously damaged in the second Cod War. In 1974, the new Labour Government made a policy decision that only anti-submarine frigates would be operational in the frigate fleet from then on. For the rest of the decade, Salisbury and Lincoln alternated between the standby squadron and lengthy re-activations under a number of pretexts. HMS Salisbury, under the first frigate command of Hugo White (later Admiral of the Fleet), was extensively involved in the third Cod War, holding the line against Icelandic gunboats within 4.8 kilometres (3 mi) of multinational fishing fleets, colliding seven times with the Iceland gunboats Tyr and Aegir in March and April 1976.

Following serious damage in the Cod War, HMS Lincoln was repaired and returned to service until the end of the decade. After refits, it returned to the status of an operational RN frigate declared to NATO.

== Construction programme ==
Pennant	Name	Builder	Ordered	Laid Down	Launched	Accepted into service (Note: The term used in Navy Estimates and Defence Estimates is "accepted into service". Hansard has used the term acceptance date. Leo Marriott in his various books uses the term "completed", as does Jane's Fighting Ships. These terms all mean the same thing: the date the Navy accepts the vessel from the builder. This date is important because maintenance cycles, etc. are generally calculated from the acceptance date.)	Commissioned	Estimated building cost (Note: "Unit cost, i.e. excluding cost of certain items (e.g. aircraft, First Outfits)." (from Defences Estimates))	Fate
F32	Salisbury	(a) HM Dockyard, Devonport (b) Vickers Armstrong (Engineers) Ltd, Barrow-in-Furness	21 August 1951	23 January 1952	25 June 1953	27 February 1957	27 February 1957	£2,900,000	Sale to Egypt was cancelled in 1978 whilst on delivery trip. In May 1980 served as harbour training ship at Devonport. Sunk as target on 30 September 1985.
F59	Chichester	(a) The Fairfield Shipbuilding and Engineering Co Ltd, Govan, Glasgow (b) British Polar Engines Ltd, Glasgow	28 June 1951	26 June 1953	21 June 1955	May 1958	16 May 1958	£3,291,000	Converted to harbour guardship for Hong Kong 1973; sold for dismantling on 17 March 1981.
F61	Llandaff	(a) R & W Hawthorn Leslie and Co Ltd, Newcastle upon Tyne (b) British Polar Engines Ltd, Glasgow	28 June 1951	27 August 1953	30 November 1955	April 1958	11 April 1958	£3,393,000	Sold to Bangladesh 10 December 1978 as BNS Umar Farooq. Claimed sold for breaking up in April 1983. but was in active service until 2015. Finally beached for breaking at Chittagong on 19 November 2016.
F99	Lincoln	(a) The Fairfield Shipbuilding and Engineering Co Ltd, Govan, Glasgow (b) Cammell Laird and Co (Shipbuilders and Engineers) Ltd, Birkenhead	28 June 1951	1 June 1955	6 April 1959	July 1960	7 July 1960	£3,685,000	Sale to Egypt in 1978 was cancelled. Recommissioned briefly in August 1979 as submarine target. Was intended to be sold to Bangladesh in 1982, but transfer did not take place. Ship dismantled in 1983.

Three further ships of the class were planned. Two of these, intended as HMS Exeter and HMS Gloucester, were cancelled under the 1957 Defence Review, while a third, HMS Coventry, was suspended. It was hoped to order Coventry in 1961, but in the end it was decided to order the planned hull as a Leander-class frigate that became HMS Penelope.
