= BNS Khalid Bin Walid =

Guided missile frigate of the Bangladesh Navy

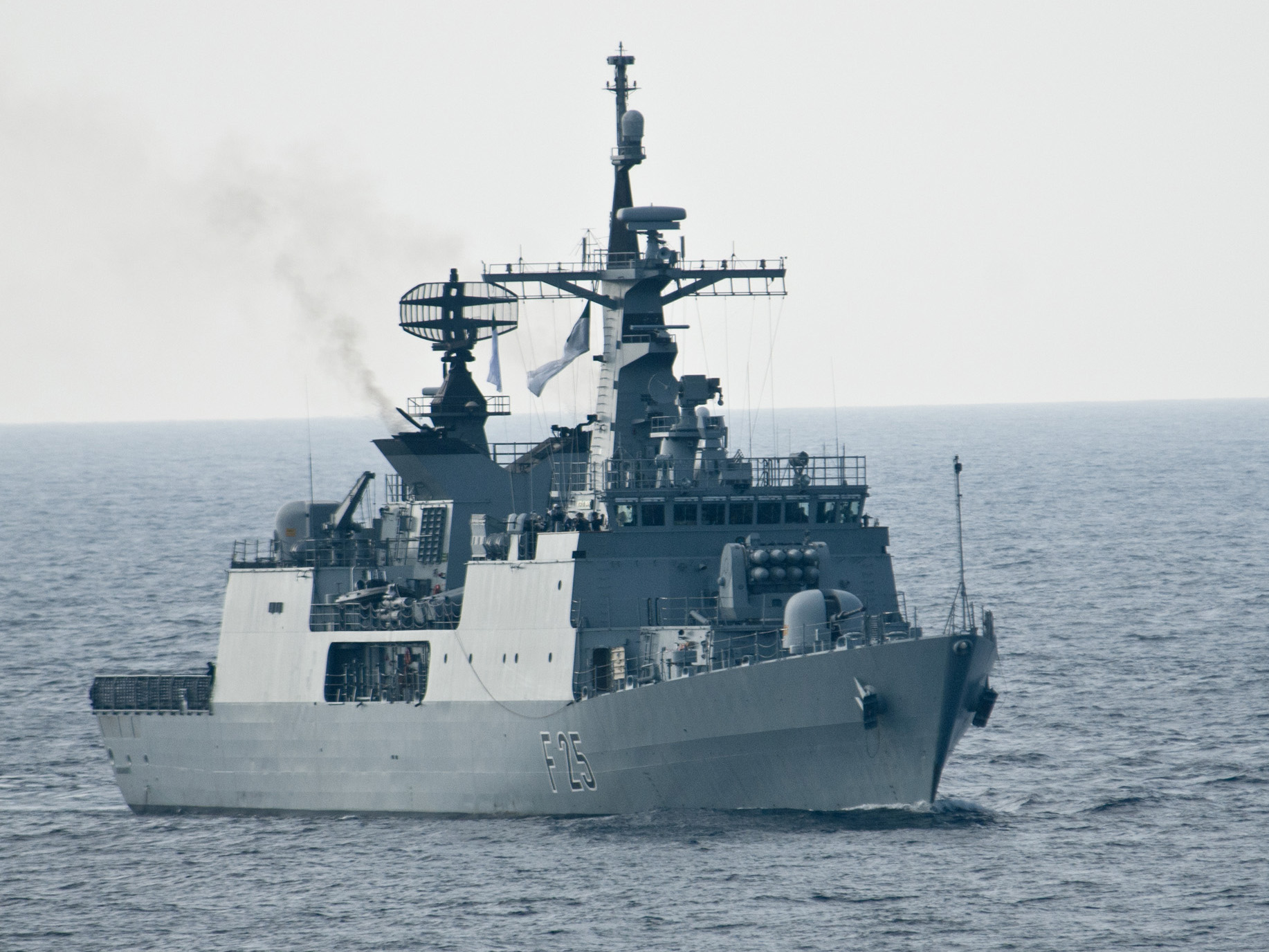
- BNS Khalid Bin Walid steams off the coast of Bangladesh during CARAT 2012 exercise

History

Bangladesh
- Name: BNS Khalid Bin Walid
- Namesake: Khalid Bin Walid
- Ordered: 1998
- Builder: Daewoo Shipbuilding & Marine Engineering, Republic of Korea
- Laid down: 12 May 1999
- Launched: 29 August 2000
- Commissioned: 20 June 2001
- Decommissioned: 13 February 2002
- Reclassified: Reduced to the reserve on 13 February 2002
- Name: BNS Khalid Bin Walid
- Recommissioned: 13 July 2007
- Home port: Chittagong
- Identification: Pennant number: F 25
- Nickname(s): BNS KBW
- Status: In active service

General characteristics
- Class & type: Modified Ulsan-class frigate
- Displacement: 2400-2500 tons
- Length: 103.7 m (340 ft)
- Beam: 12.5 m (41 ft)
- Draught: 3.8 m (12 ft)
- Propulsion: CODAD: 4 SEMT-Pielstick 12V PA6V280 STC diesels; 22,501 hp (16.779 MW) sustained; 2 × shafts
- Speed: 25 knots (46 km/h)
- Range: 4,000 nautical miles (7,400 km)
- Complement: 186 (16 officers)
- Sensors & processing systems: DA08 (SPQ-501/RAWS03) E/F band (S-band) air searc radion radar; LIROD Mk 2 K-band TWT fire control radar; VARIANT surface search radar; MIRADOR optical surveillance and tracking system; Type 345 fire control radar (for FM-t; ECM:Racal Scorpion 2; jammer; Decoy: 2 x 15-tube SLQ-261 torpedo acoustic countermeasures; 2 × Super Barricade chaff launchers
- Armament: 2 × 4 Otomat Mk 2 Block IV AShM; 1 × 8 FM-90N SAM; 1 × Otobreda 76 mm/62 Super Rapid; 2 × DARDO 40 mm dual barreled CIWS; 6 (2 triple) x 324 mm B-515 torpedo tubes for Whitehead A244S
- Aircraft carried: 1 ×AgustaWestland AW109 SAR Helicopter

BNS Khalid Bin Walid (Bengali: বানৌজা খালিদ বিন ওয়ালিদ) is a guided-missile frigate of the Bangladesh Navy. It is currently based at Chittagong, serving with the Commodore Commanding BN Flotilla (COMBAN). It is currently the only frigate of the Bangladesh Navy armed with ASW torpedo and gun based CIWS. It is named after the Muslim general Khalid Bin Walid.

== Armament ==
This vessel has the Otomat Mk 2 Block IV anti-ship missiles on board, with a range of 180 kilometres (110 mi).

In April 2018, Bangladesh Navy issued a tender for replacing the two 40 mm Fast Forty guns on board the ship with a new 40 mm twin-barrel gun system.

== Career ==
The ship was ordered in March 1998. She was laid down on 12 May 1999 at Daewoo Shipbuilding & Marine Engineering, Republic of Korea. She was launched on 29 August 2000, and commissioned on 20 June 2001.

In 2007 she was recommissioned under a new name, as BNS Khalid Bin Walid. In 2009, she was renamed BNS Bangabandhu.

The ship participated in Exercise Ferocious Falcon, a multinational crisis management exercise, held at Doha, Qatar in November 2012. While transiting to the exercise, the frigate visited the port of Kochi, India. The ship took part in Cooperation Afloat Readiness and Training(CARAT), an annual bilateral exercise with United States Navy, from 2011 to 2015.

On 29 August 2013, the ship received the National Standard.

In 2014, Malaysia Airlines Flight 370, a 777-200ER, went missing while in flight. Due to the possibility of finding the wreckage in the Bay of Bengal, Khalid bin Walid, along with the frigate Umar Farooq, joined the search operation in the region.

On 31 May 2016, she started for Colombo, Sri Lanka with 150 tonnes of relief for the victims of the floods and landslides caused by Cyclone Roanu. The relief included drugs, water purifying machines, pure drinking water, tents, food items and generators. She also joined the rescue efforts there.

The ship left for Qatar on 22 February 2018 to take part in 6th Doha International Maritime Exhibition and Conference (DIMDEX-2018) to be held from 12 to 14 March 2018. She paid goodwill visits to Mumbai port, in India, from 2 to 5 March 2018 and to Colombo port in Sri Lanka from 22 to 25 March 2018. On 29 March 2018, she returned to her homeport, Chittagong.

Following the fall of the Sheikh Hasina led Awami League government, BNS Bangabandhu was renamed to BNS Khalid Bin Walid.

== See also ==
- List of active ships of the Bangladesh Navy
