= HMS Llandaff =

1958 Type 61 or Salisbury class frigate of the Royal Navy

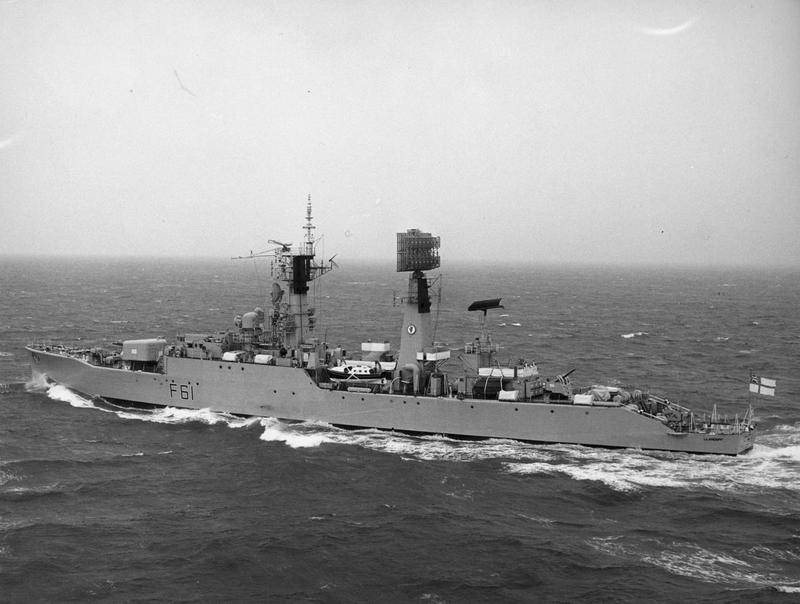
- HMS Llandaff, 14 May 1969 (IWM)

History

United Kingdom
- Name: HMS Llandaff
- Namesake: Llandaff
- Ordered: 28 June 1951
- Builder: Hawthorn Leslie and Company
- Laid down: 27 August 1953
- Launched: 30 November 1955
- Commissioned: 11 April 1958
- Identification: Pennant number F61
- Fate: Transferred to the Bangladeshi Navy 10 December 1976 as BNS Umar Farooq

Bangladesh
- Name: BNS Umar Farooq
- Acquired: 1976
- Commissioned: 10 December 1976
- Identification: Pennant number F-16
- Fate: Scrapped 2016

General characteristics
- Class & type: Salisbury-class frigate
- Displacement: 2,170 tons standard; 2,400 tons full load
- Length: 340 ft (103.6 m) o/a; 330 ft (100.6 m) pp
- Beam: 40 ft (12.2 m)
- Draught: 15 ft 6 in (4.72 m)
- Propulsion: 8 × ASR1 diesels, 12,400 shp (9,200 kW), 2 shafts
- Speed: 24 kn (28 mph; 44 km/h)
- Range: 7,500 nmi (8,600 mi; 13,900 km) at 16 kn (18 mph; 30 km/h)
- Complement: 207
- Sensors & processing systems: Type 960 air search radar, later Type 965 AKE-2; Type 293Q target indication radar, later Type 993; Type 982 aircraft direction radar; Type 277Q height finding radar, later Type 278; Type 974 navigation radar, later Type 978; Type 285 fire control radar on director Mark 6M; Type 262 fire control on STAAG mount; Type 1010 Cossor Mark 10 IFF; Type 174 search sonar; Type 170 attack sonar
- Armament: 1 × twin 4.5 in gun Mark 6; 1 × twin 40 mm Bofors gun STAAG Mark 2, later 1 × twin 40 mm Bofors gun Mk.5; 1 × Squid A/S mortar

HMS Llandaff was a Salisbury-class or Type 61 aircraft direction frigate of the British Royal Navy, named after the district of Llandaff in Cardiff, Wales. She was built by Hawthorn Leslie and Company at Hebburn on the River Tyne, being laid down on 27 August 1953 and launched on 30 November 1955.

== Construction ==
Llandaff was one of three Salisbury-class frigates ordered on 28 June 1951 as a follow-on to the name ship of the class. She was laid down at Hawthorn Leslie's Hebburn shipyard on 27 August 1953, She was launched by Countess Mountbatten, the wife of Earl Louis Mounbatten, on 30 November 1955. Llandaff broke away from her moorings in a storm on 1 March 1956 and was damaged by collisions with the cruiser Bermuda, the frigate Russell and a merchant ship before she could be brought under control. Despite this damage, she completed and was accepted into service on 11 April 1958.

== Royal Navy service ==
On entry to service Llandaff was the first ship to be trained by the newly established Flag Officer Sea Training organisation at Portland.

She re-commissioned for the 5th time at Singapore in 1967 and returned to UK waters in September 1968, completing the commission at Devonport in 1970.

Between June and September 1968, Llandaff was in transit from Singapore to the United Kingdom. Her trip home was a 'showing the flag' voyage via the Solomon Islands, Cairns (Australia), Auckland (New Zealand), Fiji, Rotuma, the Gilbert Islands, Honolulu (Pearl Harbor), Monterey (USA), Long Beach for refuelling, transit through the Panama Canal then Barbados with a short stop in Azores for refuelling, then home to Devonport.

== Bangladesh Navy service ==
Llandaff was sold to the Bangladeshi Navy on 10 December 1976 and was renamed Umar Farooq. Umar Farooq was converted into a training ship where officers under-training and sailors get sea time. During her long refit, a female officers' gunroom and heads were installed so that female officers under-training can also be accommodated. In the Bangladesh Navy she undertook flag-showing and training visits abroad, notable among them the goodwill visit to India, Pakistan and Maldives in 1989, participation in the Korean International Fleet Review in 1998 and the 2014 search for Malaysia Airlines Flight 370. With three other frigates she formed the 7th Frigate Squadron and was stationed in Chittagong, Bangladesh. In 2016 she was sold for scrapping.

== Publications ==
- Blackman, Raymond V. B., ed. (1960). Jane's Fighting Ships 1960–61. London: Sampson Low, Marston & Co., Ltd.
- Colledge, J. J.; Warlow, Ben (2006) [1969]. Ships of the Royal Navy: The Complete Record of All Fighting Ships of the Royal Navy from the 15th Century to the Present (3rd Rev ed.). London: Chatham Publishing. ISBN 978-1-86176-281-8. OCLC 67375475.
- Critchley, Mike (1986). British Warships Since 1945: Part 5: Frigates. Liskeard, UK: Maritime Books. ISBN 0-907771-13-0.
- Friedman, Norman (2008). British Destroyers & Frigates: The Second World War and After. Barnsley, UK: Seaforth Publishing. ISBN 978-1-84832-015-4.
- Gardiner, Robert; Chumbley, Stephen (1995). Conway's All The World's Fighting Ships 1947–1995. Annapolis, Maryland, USA: Naval Institute Press. ISBN 1-55750-132-7.
- Marriott, Leo (1983). Royal Navy Frigates 1945–1983. Shepperton, UK: Ian Allan. ISBN 0-7110-1322-5.
