= Pillau-class cruiser =

Class of light cruisers of the German Imperial Navy

- Pillau, c. 1914–1916

Class overview
- Builders: Schichau, Danzig
- Operators: Imperial German Navy; Regia Marina
- Preceded by: Graudenz class
- Succeeded by: Wiesbaden class
- Built: 1913–1915
- In commission: 1914–1943
- Planned: 2
- Completed: 2
- Lost: 2

General characteristics
- Type: Light cruiser
- Displacement: Normal: 4,390 t (4,320 long tons; 4,840 short tons); Full load: 5,252 t (5,169 long tons; 5,789 short tons)
- Length: 135.3 m (444 ft)
- Beam: 13.6 m (45 ft)
- Draft: 5.98 m (19.6 ft)
- Installed power: 10 × water-tube boilers; 30,000 shp (22,400 kW)
- Propulsion: 2 × steam turbines; 2 × screw propellers
- Speed: 27.5 knots (50.9 km/h)
- Range: 4,300 nmi (8,000 km; 4,900 mi) at 12 kn (22 km/h; 14 mph)
- Complement: 21 officers; 421 enlisted men
- Armament: 8 × 15 cm (5.9 in) SK L/45 guns; 2 × 8.8 cm (3.5 in) SK L/45 guns; 2 × 50 cm (19.7 in) torpedo tubes; 120 mines
- Armor: Deck 80 mm (3.1 in); Conning tower: 75 mm (3 in)

The Pillau class of light cruisers was a pair of ships built in Germany just before the start of World War I. The class consisted of SMS Pillau and Elbing. The ships were initially ordered for the Imperial Russian Navy in 1912, and were built by the Schichau-Werke shipyard in Danzig. After the outbreak of World War I, however, the German Kaiserliche Marine (Imperial Navy) confiscated the ships before they were completed. The ships were similar in design to other German light cruisers, although they lacked an armored belt. They were the first German light cruisers to be equipped with 15 cm SK L/45 guns, of which they carried eight. The two ships had a top speed of 27.5 knots (50.9 km/h; 31.6 mph).

Pillau and Elbing saw extensive service with the German High Seas Fleet. Pillau participated in the Battle of the Gulf of Riga in August 1915, and Elbing took part in the bombardment of Yarmouth and Lowestoft in April 1916. The following month, both ships were heavily engaged in the Battle of Jutland on 31 May –1 June; there, Elbing scored the first hit of either side in the battle. Elbing was accidentally rammed and immobilized by the German battleship SMS Posen in the confused night fighting, and her crew were ultimately forced to scuttle her. Pillau continued to serve with the fleet until the end of the war. After the German defeat, she was ceded to Italy as a war prize and renamed Bari. She served in the Regia Marina (Royal Navy) until June 1943, when she was sunk in Livorno by USAAF bombers, and eventually broken up for scrap in 1948.

== Design ==
In 1912, the Russian Navy sought builders for a pair of light cruisers; the Schichau-Werke shipyard in Danzig won the contract. The two ships were originally ordered by the Russian Navy as Maraviev Amurskyy and Admiral Nevelskoy from the Schichau-Werke that year. The two ships were laid down in 1913; Maraviev Amurskyy was launched on 11 April 1914, after which fitting-out work commenced. Both ships were requisitioned by the German Navy on 5 August 1914, and were renamed Pillau and Elbing, respectively. Elbing was launched on 21 November 1914. Pillau and Elbing were commissioned into the High Seas Fleet on 14 December 1914 and 4 September 1915, respectively.

=== General characteristics and machinery ===
The Pillau class ships were 134.30 meters (440 ft 7 in) long at the waterline and 135.30 m (443 ft 11 in) long overall They had a beam of 13.60 m (44 ft 7 in) and a draft of 5.98 m (19 ft 7 in) forward and 5.31 m (17 ft 5 in) aft. They displaced 4,390 metric tons (4,320 long tons) as designed and 5,252 t (5,169 long tons) at full load. The ships' hulls were constructed with transverse and longitudinal steel frames. The hulls were divided into sixteen watertight compartments and had a double bottom that extended for 51 percent of the length of the hull.

The ships had a crew of twenty-one officers and 421 enlisted men. They carried a number of smaller boats, including one picket boat, one barge, two yawls, and two dinghies. They were good sea boats, but were fairly stiff and suffered from severe roll. The cruisers were maneuverable, but were slow going into a turn. Steering was controlled by a single large rudder. They lost speed only slightly in a head sea, but lost up to sixty percent in hard turns.

Their propulsion system consisted of two sets of Marine steam turbines driving two 3.5-meter (11 ft) propellers. They were designed to give 30,000 shaft horsepower (22,400 kW). These were powered by six coal-fired Yarrow water-tube boilers, and four oil-fired Yarrow boilers, trunked into three funnels on the centerline. These gave the ships a top speed of 27.5 knots (50.9 km/h; 31.6 mph). The two ships carried 620 t (610 long tons) of coal, and an additional 580 t (570 long tons) of oil that gave them a range of approximately 4,300 nautical miles (8,000 km; 4,900 mi) at 12 knots (22 km/h; 14 mph). The two ships each had three turbo-generators that provided a combined electrical output of 360 kilowatts (480 hp) at 220 Volts.

=== Armament and armor ===
As designed, the ships would have mounted eight 13-centimeter (5.1 in) L/55 quick-firing guns and four 6.3 cm (2.5 in) L/38 guns of Russian design. After they were seized by the German Navy, the planned armament was revised to be standardized with new German cruisers. The standard 10.5 cm (4.1 in) SK L/45 gun used on previous German cruisers was considered, but abandoned in favor of a larger weapon. As completed, the ships were armed with eight 15 cm (5.9 in) SK L/45 guns in single pedestal mounts. Two were placed side by side forward on the forecastle, four were located amidships, two on either side, and two were side by side aft. They were the first German light cruisers to mount the 15 cm gun. These guns had a range of 17,600 m (19,200 yd) and were supplied with a total of 1,024 rounds of ammunition. Pillau and Elbing also carried four 5.2 cm (2 in) SK L/55 anti-aircraft guns, though these were replaced with a pair of two 8.8 cm (3.5 in) SK L/45 anti-aircraft guns. They were also equipped with a pair of 50 cm (19.7 in) torpedo tubes mounted on the deck. The ships could also carry 120 mines.

Since they had been ordered and designed for the Russian Navy, the ships did not possess a waterline armored belt like contemporary German designs. The conning tower had 75 mm (3 in) thick sides and a 50 mm (2 in) thick roof. The deck was covered with 80 mm (3.1 in) thick armor plate forward, which was reduced to 20 mm (0.79 in) aft. Sloping armor 40 mm (1.6 in) thick provided a measure of protection on the upper portion of the ships' sides. The main battery guns were equipped with 50 mm thick gun shields.

== Service history ==
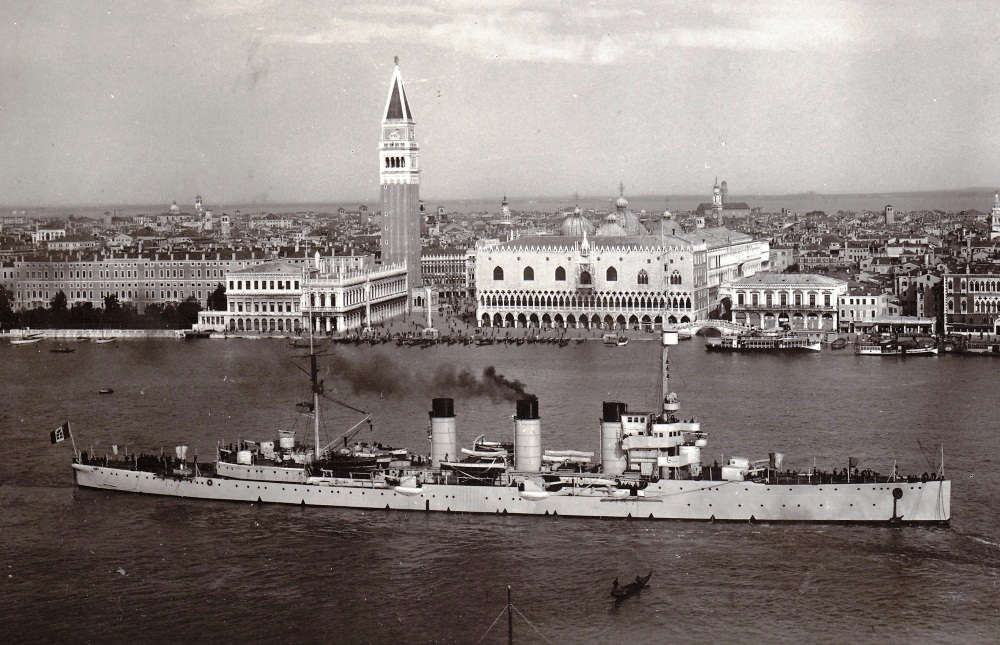
Ex-Pillau as the Italian Bari in Venice between the wars

=== Pillau ===
Pillau spent the majority of her career in II Scouting Group, and saw service in both the Baltic and North Seas. In August 1915, she participated in the Battle of the Gulf of Riga against the Russian Navy, and on 31 May – 1 June 1916, she saw significant action at the Battle of Jutland. She was hit by a large-caliber shell once in the engagement, but suffered only moderate damage. She assisted the badly damaged battlecruiser SMS Seydlitz reach port on 2 June after the conclusion of the battle. She also took part in the Second Battle of Heligoland Bight, though was not damaged in the engagement. Pillau was assigned to the planned, final operation of the High Seas Fleet in the closing weeks of the war, but a large scale mutiny in the fleet forced it to be canceled.

After the end of the war, Pillau was ceded to Italy as a war prize in 1920. Renamed Bari, she was commissioned in the Regia Marina (Royal Navy) in January 1924. She was modified and rebuilt several times over the next two decades. In the early years of World War II, she provided gunfire support to Italian troops in several engagements in the Mediterranean. In 1943, she was slated to become an anti-aircraft defense ship, but while awaiting conversion, she was sunk by USAAF bombers in Livorno in June 1943. The wreck was partially scrapped by the Germans in 1944, and ultimately raised for scrapping in January 1948.

=== Elbing ===
Elbing participated in only two major operations during her career. The first, the bombardment of Yarmouth and Lowestoft, occurred in April 1916; there, she briefly engaged the British Harwich Force. A month later, she took part in the Battle of Jutland, where she scored the first hit of the engagement. She was heavily engaged in the confused fighting on the night of 31 May – 1 June, and shortly after midnight she was accidentally rammed by the battleship Posen, which tore a hole in the ship's hull. Flooding disabled the ship's engines and electrical generators, rendering her immobilized and without power. At around 02:00, a German torpedo boat took off most of her crew, and an hour later the remaining men scuttled the ship; they escaped in the ship's cutter and were later picked up by a Dutch steamer.
