= BNS Umar Farooq (1976) =

1955 Salisbury-class frigate

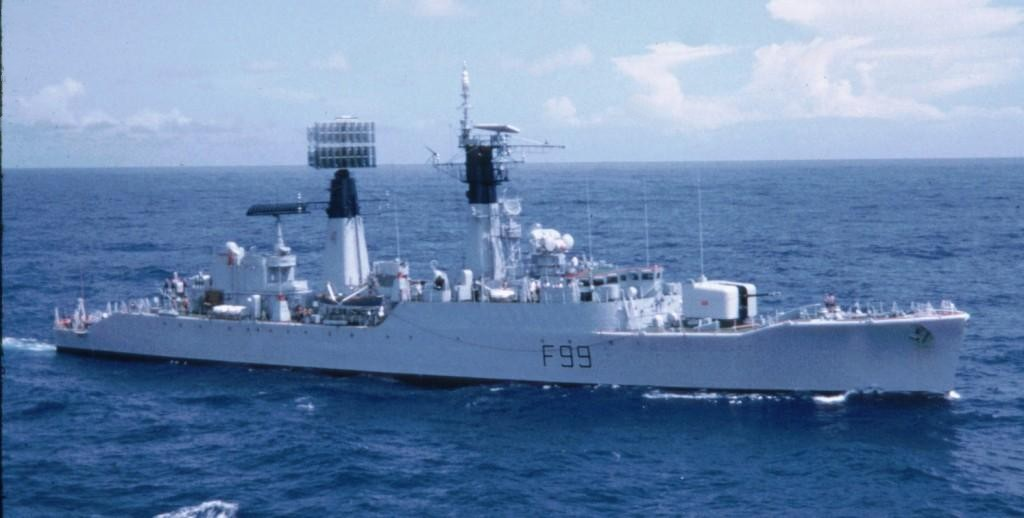
- Another Salisbury-class frigate HMS Lincoln in 1972

History

Bangladesh
- Name: BNS Umar Farooq
- Builder: Hawthorn Leslie and Company
- Laid down: 27 August 1953
- Launched: 30 November 1955
- Acquired: 1976
- Commissioned: 10 December 1976
- Decommissioned: 30 December 2015
- Identification: Pennant number: F-16
- Fate: Scrapped

General characteristics
- Class & type: Salisbury-class frigate
- Displacement: 2,170 tons (standard), 2,408 tons (loaded)
- Length: 103.5 m (340 ft)
- Beam: 12.5 m (41 ft)
- Draught: 4.7 m (15 ft)
- Propulsion: 8 × ASR1 diesels, 12,400 shp (9.2 MW), 2 × shafts
- Speed: 24 knots (44 km/h)
- Range: 2,300 nautical miles (4,300 km) at 24 knots (44 km/h); 7,500 nautical miles (13,900 km) at 16 knots (30 km/h)
- Complement: 223 (14 officers)
- Sensors & processing systems: Radar System: (Air/Surface Search): Marconi Type 965 with double AKE 2 array; Surface Search/Fire Control System: Plessey Type 993; Navigation: Kelvin Hughes Type 1007; Weapons Control: Type 275; Sonar Systems: Type 174 (Hull Mounted); Graseby Type 170B (Hull Mounted)
- Electronic warfare & decoys: Cutlass 242, Scorpion Jammer; Decoy: 1 × decoy launcher
- Armament: 1 × twin 4.5 in guns Mark 6; 1 × 40 mm Bofors gun Mk.5; 1 × Squid A/S mortar

BNS Umar Farooq was a Salisbury-class frigate of the Bangladesh Navy. She was the first frigate to enter service with the Bangladesh Navy. The ship was named after the second Rashidun Caliph Umar.

== History ==
The ship previously served the Royal Navy as HMS Llandaff, from 1958 to 1976. On 10 December 1976, she was transferred to the Bangladesh Navy.

== Career ==
On 10 December 1976, BNS Umar Farooq was commissioned in the Bangladesh Navy. She was based at Chittagong, serving with the Commodore Commanding BN Flotilla (COMBAN). About 200 personnel served aboard Umar Farooq, with most living aboard her.

Umar Farooq paid a goodwill visit to India, Pakistan and the Maldives in 1989. The ship participated in the International Fleet Review in South Korea in 1998.

On 26 February 2007, Umar Farooq paid a two-day goodwill visit to Kochi Port of India. In December 2010, the ship made a three-day visit to the Indian naval base at Visakhapatnam.

In March 2014, Malaysia Airlines Flight 370, a 777-200ER, disappeared during flight. Due to the possibility of finding the wreckage in the Bay of Bengal, Umar Farooq, along with the frigate Bangabandhu, joined the search operation in this region.

She was decommissioned on 30 December 2015 after serving Bangladesh Navy for around 39 years, with a total service life of 57 years. After brief use as a museum ship from December 2015, she was sold for scrapping in Bangladesh in 2016. She was replaced by BNS Umar Farooq (2019), a Chinese-built Type 053H3 frigate with the same name and pennant number.

== Mission ==
Umar Farooq was deployed to support operations off the Bangladeshi coast, such as anti-piracy and anti-smuggling operations, as well as search and rescue deployments.

== See also ==
- List of historic ships of the Bangladesh Navy
