= Light cruiser =

Type of small to medium-sized warship

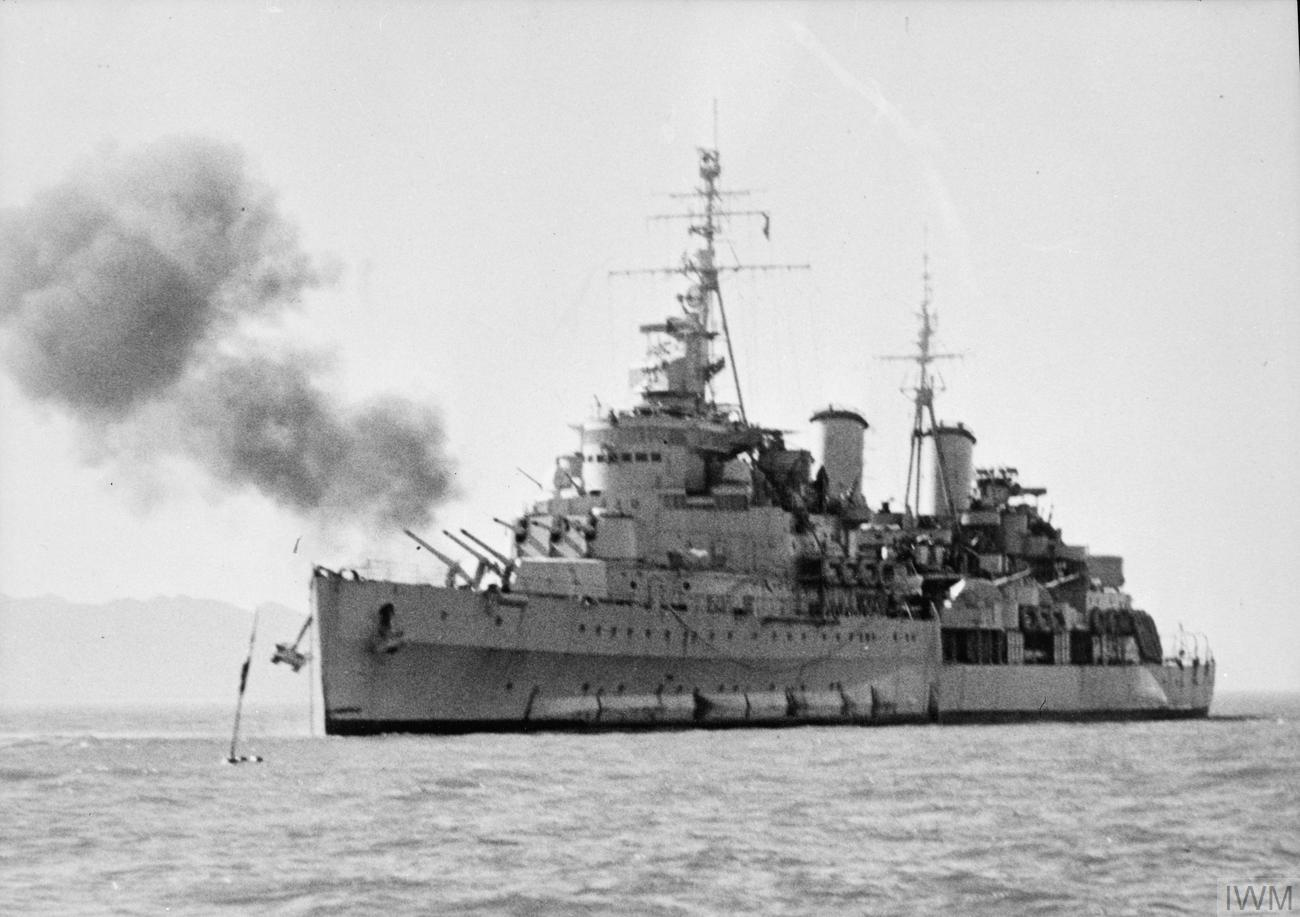
HMS Belfast, one of the last surviving light cruisers. She carries 12 6-inch guns and displaces 11,553 tons – "light" in World War II referred to gun size, not displacement.

A light cruiser was a type of small or medium-sized warship. The term is a shortening of the phrase "light armored cruiser", describing a small ship that carried armor in the same way as an armored cruiser: a protective belt and deck. Prior to this smaller cruisers had been of the protected cruiser model, possessing armored decks only. While lighter and smaller than other contemporary ships they were still true cruisers, retaining the extended radius of action and self-sufficiency to act independently around the world. Cruisers mounting larger guns and heavier armor relative to most light cruisers would come to be known as heavy cruisers, though the designation of 'light' versus 'heavy' cruisers would vary somewhat between navies. Through their history light cruisers served in a variety of roles, primarily on long-range detached patrol work, covering other military operations or global shipping lanes, as scouts and screens for battle fleets, as destroyer command ships, fire-support vessels or even as convoy escorts.

== Origins and development ==
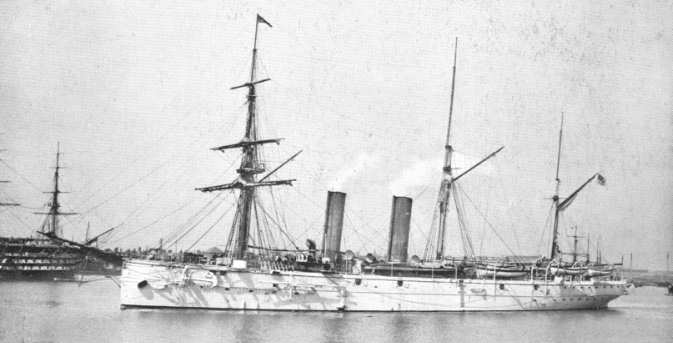
HMS Mercury

The first small steam-powered cruisers were built for the British Royal Navy with HMS Mercury launched in 1878. Such second and third class protected cruisers evolved, gradually becoming faster, better armed and better protected. Germany took a lead in small cruiser design in the 1890s, building a class of fast cruisers—the Gazelle class—copied by other nations. Such vessels were powered by coal-fired boilers and reciprocating steam engines and relied in part on the arrangement of coal bunkers for their protection. The adoption of oil-fired water-tube boilers and steam turbine engines meant that older small cruisers rapidly became obsolete. Furthermore, new construction could not rely on the protection of coal bunkers and would therefore have to adopt some form of side armoring. The British Chatham group of Town-class cruisers were a departure from previous designs; with turbine propulsion, mixed coal and oil firing and a 2-inch protective armored belt as well as deck. Thus, by definition, they were armored cruisers, despite displacing only 4,800 tons; the light armored cruiser had arrived. The first true modern light cruisers were the Arethusa class which had all oil-firing and used lightweight destroyer-type machinery to make 29 knots (54 km/h).

== History ==
=== World War I ===
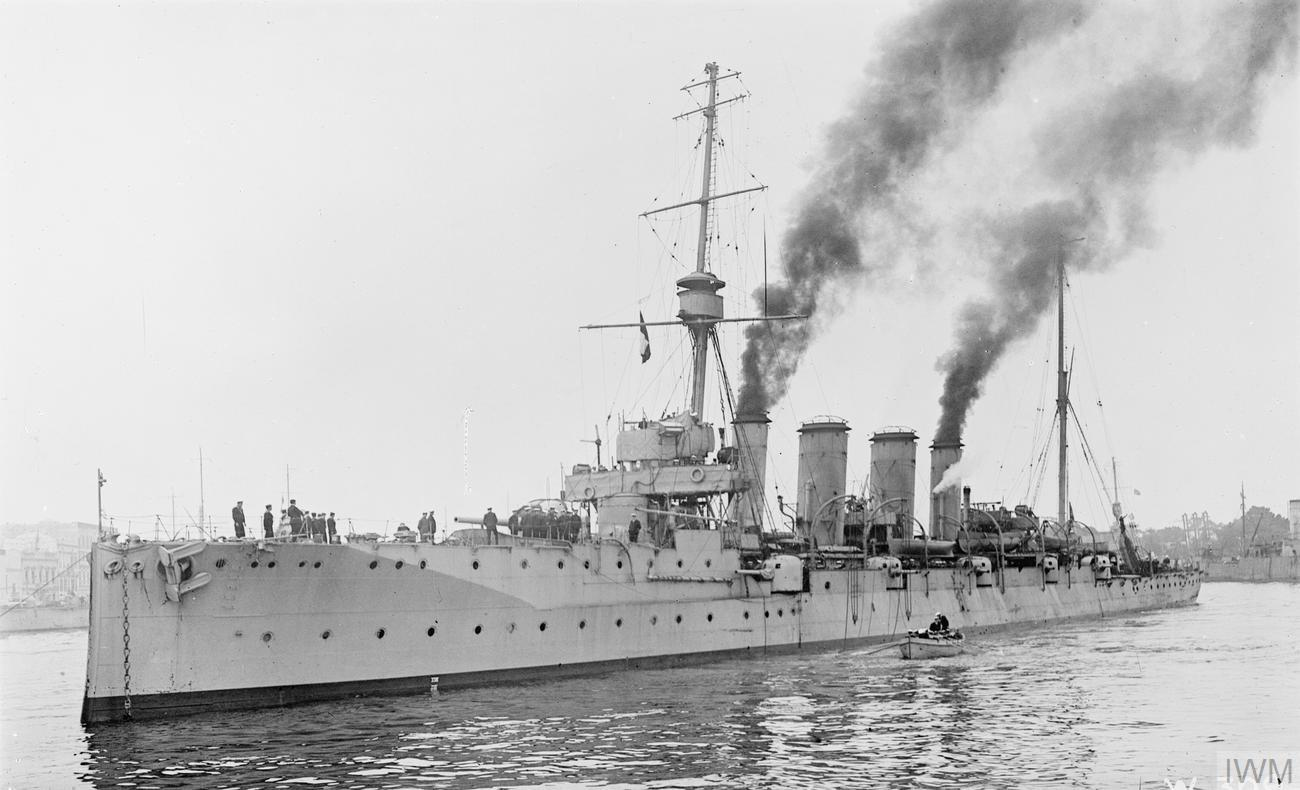
HMS Gloucester, one of the Town class, in 1917

By World War I, British light cruisers often had either two 6-inch (152 mm) and perhaps eight 4-inch (102 mm) guns, or a uniform armament of 6-inch guns on a ship of around 5,000 tons, while German light cruisers progressed during the war from 4.1-inch (104 mm) to 5.9-inch (150 mm) guns. Cruiser construction in Britain continued uninterrupted until Admiral "Jacky" Fisher's appointment as First Sea Lord in 1904. Due in part to the desire to curtail excess expenditures in light of the increasing cost of keeping up with German naval production and in part because he felt the type to be outdated, Fisher authorized few new cruisers and scrapped 70 older ones. Fisher's belief that battlecruisers would take the place of light cruisers to protect commercial shipping soon proved impractical, as their high construction cost precluded their availability in sufficient numbers to do so, and destroyers were too small for scouting duties. The group of 21 Town-class cruisers begun in 1910 proved excellent in scouting in all types of weather and could carry enough fuel and ammunition to guard the shipping lanes. The Arethusa class, launched three years later, was also successful. British designers continued enlarging and refining subsequent cruiser designs throughout the war. The C class ships were started in 1913, and of these, HMS Caroline remains - the only extant survivor of the Battle of Jutland.

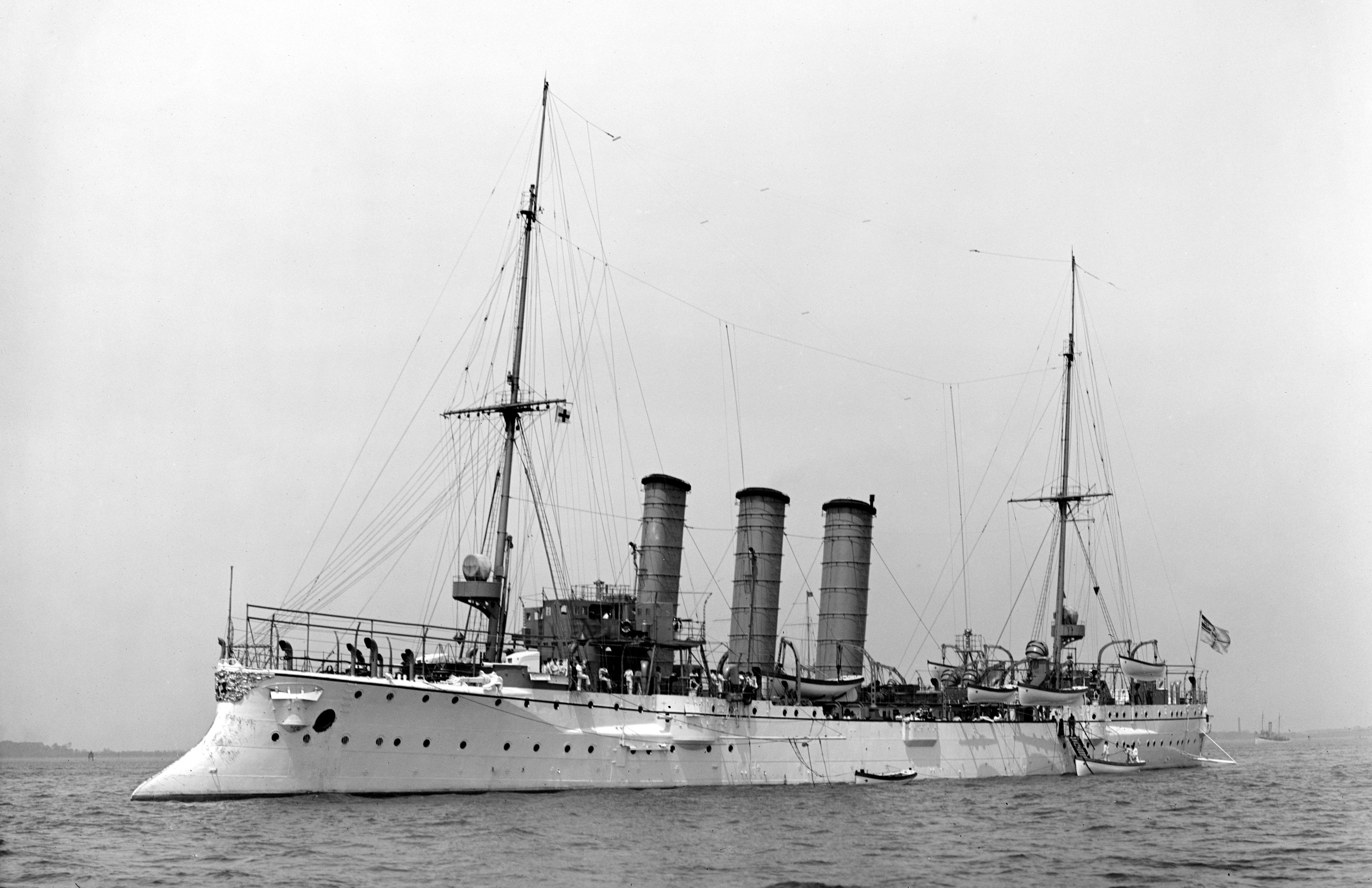
SMS Bremen

The Germans built a number of light cruisers in the belief that they were good multi-purpose vessels. Unlike the British, who built both long-range cruisers like the Town class for commerce protection and short-range "scout" cruisers for fleet support, the Germans built a single series of light cruisers for both functions. Compared to the British "scout" type the German ships were bigger, slower and less manoeuvrable but, through a successive series of classes, improved consistently in seagoing qualities. However, the Germans were very late in adapting 5.9-inch guns (not doing so until the Pillau class of 1913); Grand Admiral Alfred von Tirpitz's recalcitrance over the issue overrode the desires of others in the German Navy. For about a three-year period after the British Weymouth class of the Town series, completed with a uniform armament of 6-inch guns, and before the German Pillau class, German light cruisers (such as the Magdeburg and Karlsruhe-class cruisers) were faster but maintained a lighter 104 mm main armament compared to their British Town-class counterparts. With the Pillau and Wiesbaden-class cruisers the Germans followed the British example of heavier guns.

Earlier German light cruisers were in competition with a series of British scout cruisers which had a higher speed of 25 knots, but smaller 3-inch 12 pounder guns or 4-inch guns. The Germans completed the last two of their Bremen-class cruisers in 1906 and 1907 and followed them up with four Königsberg-class and two Dresden-class cruisers between 1905 and 1908. These last two classes, larger and faster than the Bremens, were armed the same (ten 4.1-inch guns) and carried less deck armor. Other major powers concentrated on battleship construction and built few cruisers. The United States, Italy, and Austria-Hungary each built only a handful of scout cruisers while Japan and Spain added a few examples based on British designs; France built none at all.

During World War I, the Germans continued building larger cruisers with 150 mm guns while the British Arethusa class and early C-class cruisers reverted to an emphasis on superior speed with a more lightly armed design for fleet support.

=== Between the wars ===
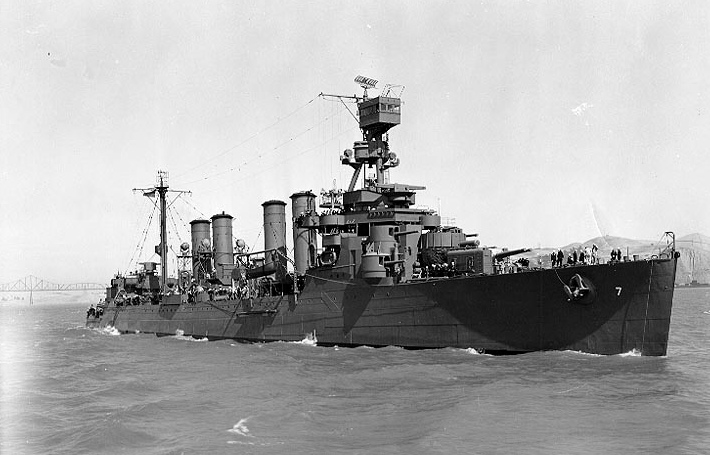
USS Raleigh, an Omaha-class cruiser, in 1942. Note casemates at bow.

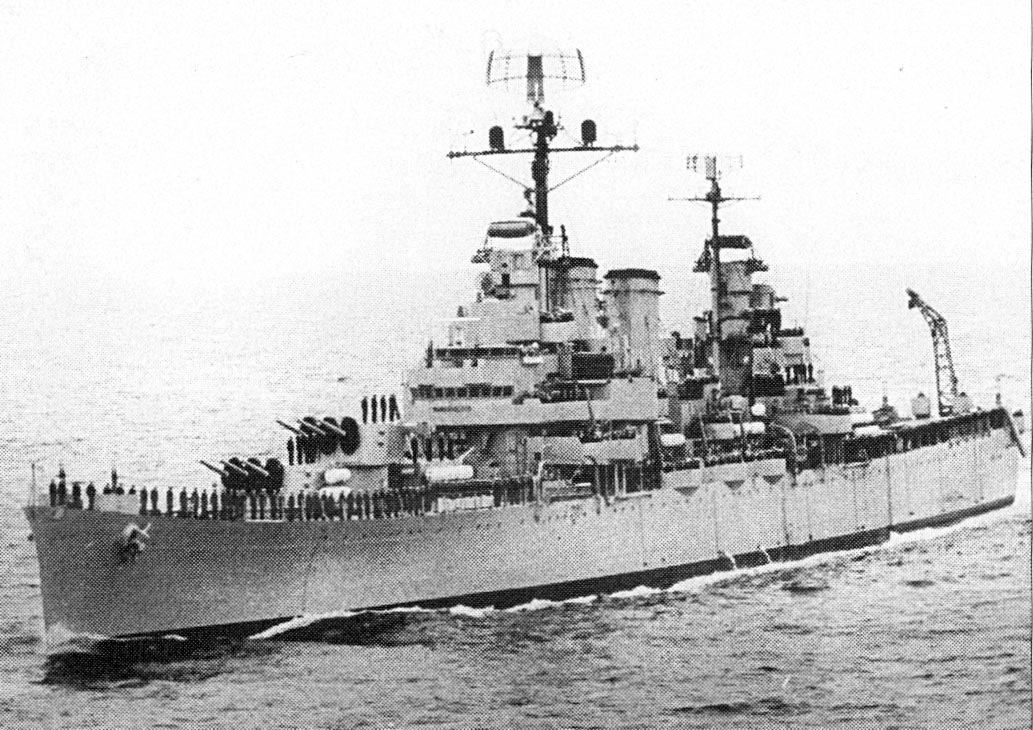
Argentine cruiser ARA General Belgrano (ex-USS Phoenix)

The United States resumed building light cruisers in 1918, largely because the ships it then had in service had become obsolete. The first of these, the ten Omaha-class ships, displaced 7,050 tons and were armed with twelve 6-inch (152 mm) guns. Eight of these guns were mounted in double-story casemates at the bow and stern, a reflection of the US prewar preference for heavy end-on fire. Fast and maneuverable, they were well-liked as seaboats despite being very wet in rough weather.

The term light cruiser was given a new definition by the London Naval Treaty of 1930. Light cruisers were defined as cruisers having guns of 6.1-inch (155 mm) or smaller, with heavy cruisers defined as cruisers having guns of up to 8-inch (203 mm). In both cases, the ships could not be greater than 10,000 tons.

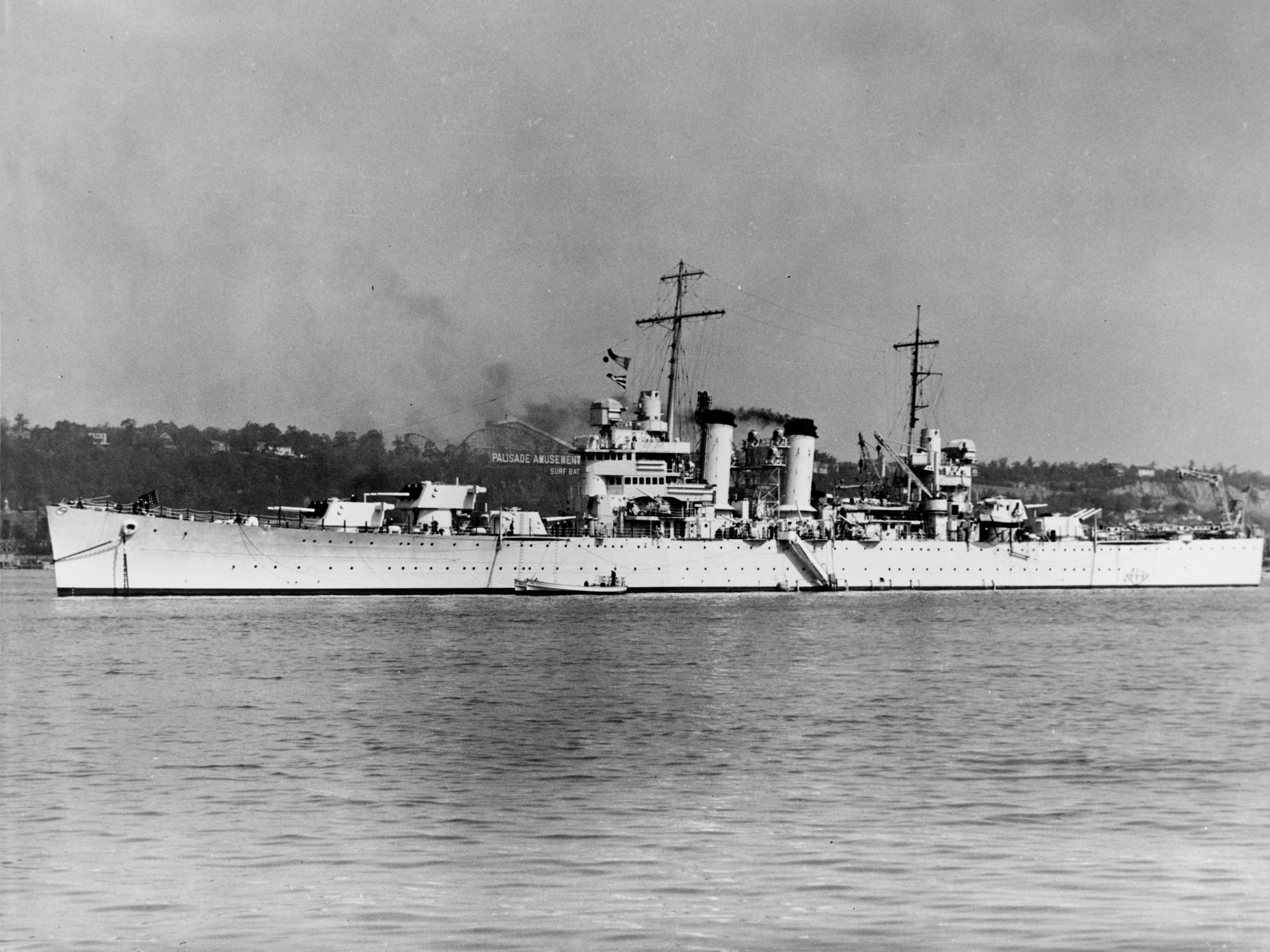
USS Brooklyn, lead ship of her class

After 1930, most naval powers concentrated on building light cruisers since they had already built up to the maximum limitations for heavy cruisers allowed under the Washington treaty. Japan laid down its four Mogami-class cruisers between 1931 and 1934. The political climate from 1936 to 1939 gave the renewed building of light cruisers an added urgency. The British built 11 during this period, which culminated in the two Town-class ships, armed with 12 6-inch (152 mm) guns. The new ships were larger and better armored than other British treaty cruisers, with a 4.5-inch (114 mm) belt in the Towns and were capable of 32.5 knots, but for the most part tried to stay within past treaty limitations. The US also attempted to follow treaty limitations as it completed seven of its nine Brooklyn-class cruisers between 1938 and September 1939. These ships were an answer to Japan's Mogamis and were an indication of rising tensions in the Pacific theater. Japan, now considering itself under no restrictions, began rearming its Mogamis with 10 8-inch (203 mm) guns. They were thus converted into heavy cruisers.

=== World War II ===
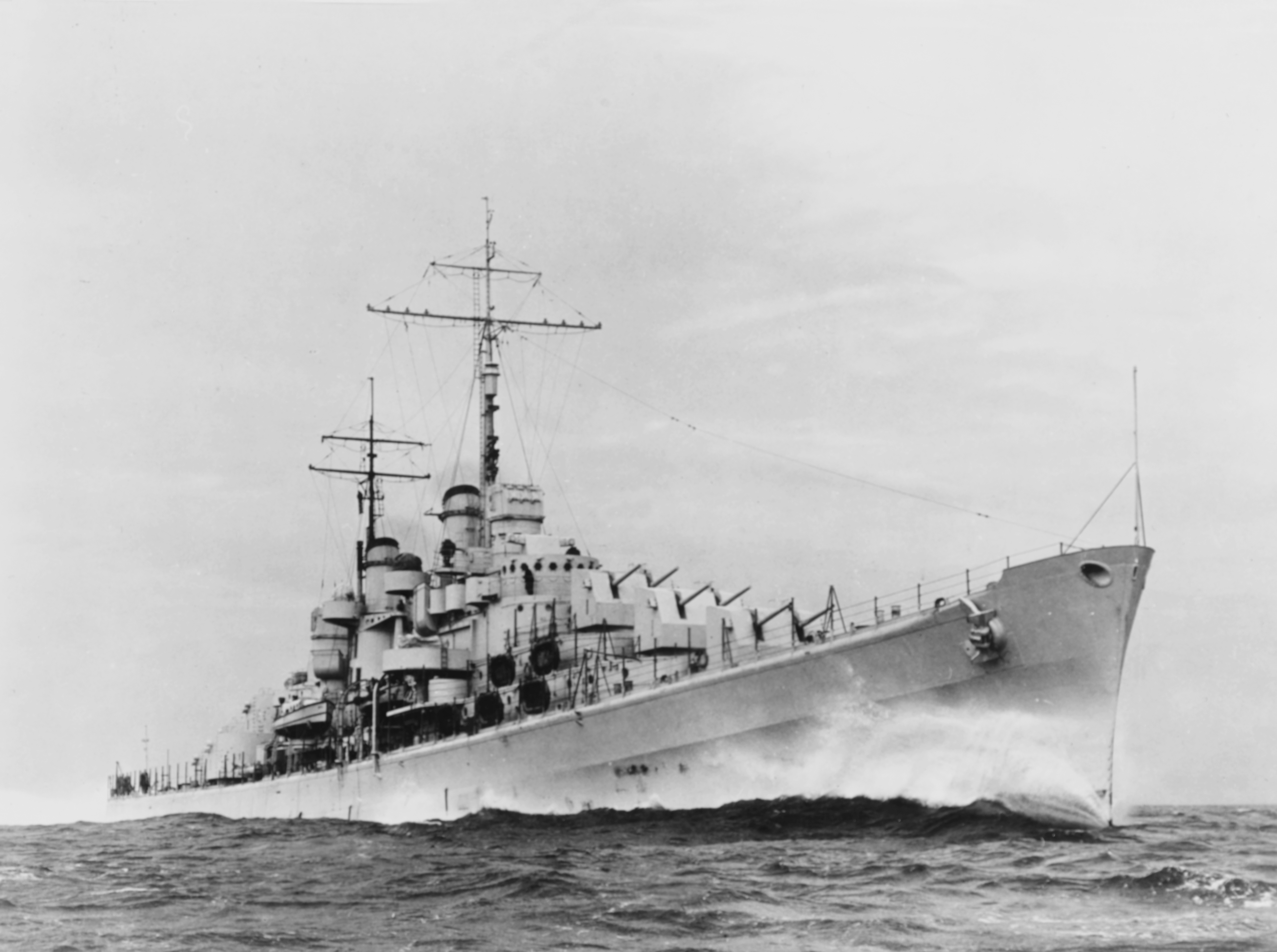
USS Atlanta

In World War II light cruisers had guns ranging from the 5 inch (127 mm) of the US Atlanta-class and 5.25 inch of the British Dido-class anti-aircraft cruisers, up to 6.1 inch, though the most common size was 6 inch, the maximum size allowed by the London Naval Treaty for a ship to be considered a light cruiser. Most Japanese light cruisers had 5.5-inch guns and could hardly be considered to be in the same class as a U.S. Navy light cruiser twice the size and carrying more than two times as much firepower. The Atlantas and Didos were born out of the tactical need for vessels to protect aircraft carriers, battleships and convoys from air attack.

The United States would move into full wartime production of the light cruisers of the Cleveland-class of which 27 would be produced. Not willing to allow changes to slow production, the United States allowed ships of the class to be built seriously overweight. They provided AA screening for the fast carriers, shore bombardment, and anti-destroyer screening for the US fleet. They traded a main gun turret for additional AA, fire control, and radar installations, over the Brooklyn class.

== Surviving light cruisers ==
Four are preserved as museum ships: HMS Belfast in London, HMS Caroline in Belfast, USS Little Rock in Buffalo, New York, and Mikhail Kutuzov at Novorossiysk. Similar ships include the protected cruisers Aurora (St. Petersburg) and USS Olympia (Philadelphia, Pennsylvania), and the bow of Puglia (Gardone Riviera).

== United States Navy classification ==
In the United States Navy, light cruisers have the hull classification symbol CL. Both heavy cruisers and light cruisers were classified under a common CL/CA sequence after 1931.

After World War II, US Navy created several light cruiser sub-variants: the Hunter-Killer cruiser (CLK), the Antiaircraft cruiser (CLAA), the light Command cruiser (CLC), and the light Guided missile cruiser (CLG). All such ships have been retired.

== See also ==
- Armored cruiser
- Battlecruiser
- Heavy cruiser
- List of cruisers of World War I
- List of cruisers of World War II
- Protected cruiser
- Unprotected cruiser

== Bibliography ==
- Osborne, Eric W., Cruisers and Battle Cruisers: An Illustrated History of Their Impact (ABC-CLIO, 2004). ISBN 1-85109-369-9.
