= HMS Whitby =

Three ships of the Royal Navy have borne the name HMS Whitby, after the Yorkshire seaside town of Whitby:

- HMS Whitby (1780) was a 12-gun storeship purchased in 1780 and sold in 1785.
- HMS Whitby was the intended name of a destroyer ordered in 1916, but due to a clerical error she was launched as HMS Whitley (L23) in 1917 and retained the latter name
- HMS Whitby (F36) was a Whitby-class frigate launched in 1954 and sold for scrapping in 1978.

== See also ==
- HMCS Whitby
