= HMS Lincoln (F99) =

1960 Type 61 or Salisbury class frigate of the Royal Navy

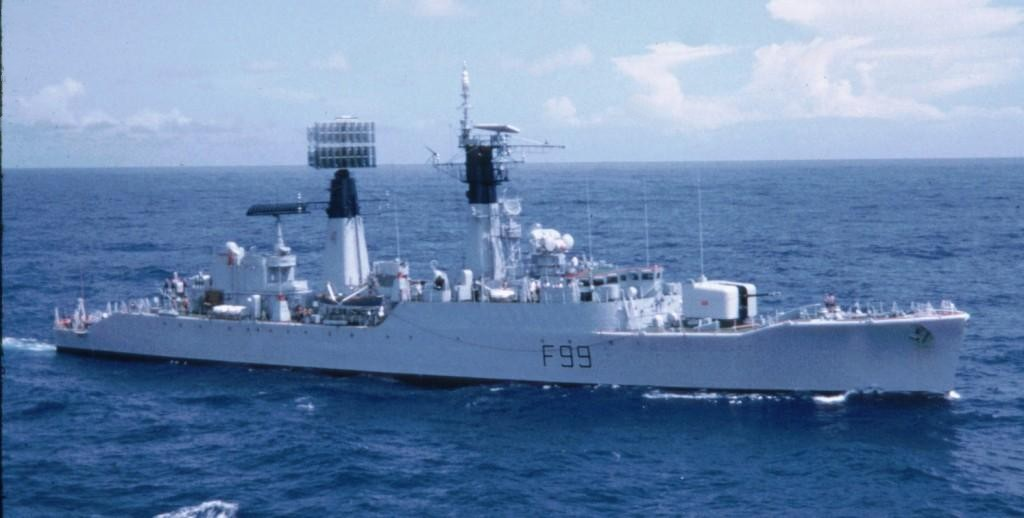
- HMS Lincoln

History

United Kingdom
- Name: HMS Lincoln (F99)
- Ordered: 28 June 1951
- Builder: Fairfields
- Laid down: 1 June 1955
- Launched: 6 April 1959
- Commissioned: 7 July 1960
- Fate: Scrapped 1983

General characteristics
- Class & type: Salisbury-class frigate
- Displacement: 2,170 tons standard; 2,400 tons full load
- Length: 340 ft (100 m) o/a
- Beam: 40 ft (12 m)
- Draught: 15 ft 6 in (4.72 m)
- Propulsion: 8 × ASR1 diesels, 12,400 shp, 2 shafts
- Speed: 24 kn (44 km/h)
- Range: 7,500 nmi (13,900 km) at 16 kn (30 km/h)
- Complement: 235
- Sensors & processing systems: Type 960 air search radar, later Type 965 AKE-2; Type 293Q target indication radar, later Type 993n; Type 982 aircraft direction radar, laterType 986; Type 277Q height finding radar, later Type 278; Type 974 navigation radarlater Type 978; Type 285 fire control radar on director Mark 6M; Type 262 fire control on STAAG mount; Type 1010 Cossor Mark 10 IFF; Type 174 search sonar; Type 170 attack sonar
- Armament: 1 × twin 4.5 in gun Mark 6; 1 × twin 40 mm Bofors gun STAAG Mark 2, later 1 × Sea Cat GWS-20 SAM; 1 × Squid A/S mortar

HMS Lincoln (F99) was a Salisbury-class or Type 61 aircraft direction frigate of the Royal Navy.

== History ==
She was built by Fairfield Shipbuilding and Engineering Company in Govan on the River Clyde. The ship was laid down in 1955, launched 6 April 1959, and completed 7 July 1960. She was named after the city of Lincoln, Lincolnshire.

On Tuesday 13 July 1965 she recommissioned in Singapore Dockyard under the command of Commander D C Nairne RN and served in the Far East during the Indonesian Conflict, she also visited Subic Bay during exercises with the US Navy and Hong Kong where she was guard ship. Returning to Singapore she sailed for Plymouth in 1966. In October 1973 she took part in the Second Cod War under the command of Commander D Howard, and after being rammed in the stern during the First Cod War Commander Howard took steps to stop this happening again. This involved mounting two lengths of railway line protruding from the stern. This had the desired effect in protecting the stern of the ship. However, damage was caused to both port and starboard sides of the ship when the ship was positioned between a target trawler and the gunboat Aegir. After a successful deployment the ship returned to Chatham to undergo repairs.

In April 1974 HMS Lincoln was decommissioned at Chatham and placed in the reserve fleet. With the serious damage being suffered by British frigates in late 1975, due to aggressive ramming by Icelandic gunboats, in the Third Cod War in 1976, Lincoln received a short refit for patrol duties with improved wooden padding on the bow area for ramming reinforcement. It has been suggested that Lincoln was selected for this ramming role as it was the one Type 61, not fitted with hull stabilizer fins. She was engaged in sea trials before commencing active service, when settlement was reached over the fishing conflict.

In 1976 the New Zealand Government sought to purchase a second hand Royal Navy ship to replace HMNZS Taranaki, and HMS Lincoln was one of four RN frigates that was offered for sale. (Note: The other frigates offered for sale were Lynx, Yarmouth and Hardy) The New Zealand Government rejected the offer for Lincoln, as her 174 Sonar had been removed and could not easily be refitted. Remaining in British service, Lincoln carried out a tour of duty in the Arctic Circle and served as the guard ship in Gibraltar during late 1976. She was finally returned to the standby squadron in Chatham in December 1977. She was proposed for sale to Egypt in 1978, but that deal also did not proceed.

In 1979 Lincoln served her final active commission as a training ship for submarine engineers, as her engines were akin to those aboard the Oberon-class submarine. She was also used in Arctic waters alongside HMS Bulwark, to provide radar cover for the initial sea trials of the Sea Harrier aircraft. Lincoln's 966 and 986 radars were used in combination with Bulwark's 986 radar to provide tracking over Scandinavia. The 986 radar had been fitted to three Type 61s, Bulwark and Ark Royal in around 1970, as a partial replacement for the complex 984 3D radar previously fitted to the carriers. In 1981 Lincoln was unsuccessfully proposed for sale to the Bangladesh Navy.

== Publications ==
- Colledge, J. J.; Warlow, Ben (2006) [1969]. Ships of the Royal Navy: The Complete Record of All Fighting Ships of the Royal Navy from the 15th Century to the Present (3rd Rev ed.). London: Chatham Publishing. ISBN 978-1-86176-281-8. OCLC 67375475.
