= A.C. Cossor =

British electronics company

A.C. Cossor Ltd. was a British electronics company founded in 1859. The company's products included valves, radios, televisions and military electronics. The company was purchased by Raytheon in 1961.

== Early history ==
The story of A.C. Cossor Ltd. began in 1859 when the company was established by Alfred Charles Cossor in Clerkenwell, London to manufacture scientific glassware. His eldest son, also called Alfred Charles Cossor joined the company in 1875, and it was he who founded the A.C. Cossor electronics company. The company's expertise in the manufacture of electrical glassware, such as early cathode-ray tubes and X-ray tubes, led the company to diversify into electronics. The younger son Frank Cossor joined the company in 1885, and eventually took over the running of the original scientific glassware company which remains to this day as Accoson, a manufacturer of sphygmomanometers.

Cossor, a go-ahead electronics firm, designed, and manufactured electronic thermionic valves, domestic radio sets and television receivers both before, and after World War II. During the War, their work on the Chain Home radar alongside Pye and EMI brought great prestige to the company. By the late 1950s, Cossor had sold its consumer electronics interests to the Philips electronics giant. Later, a merger with American Raytheon was to come, and today, Cossor is still part of the American group.

== Company timeline ==
- Early examples of X-ray tubes are produced for the scientists William Crookes and Oliver Lodge.
- In 1902 the company produces the first British-made Braun tube.
- 1904 Experimental valves are produced by Cossor for Ambrose Fleming.
- 1908 A.C. Cossor leaves his father's business to found his own company.
- William Richard Bullimore, an Australian-born electrical engineer who emigrated to the UK as a child, joins Cossor. Bullimore was responsible for the introduction of new valve types, and would eventually become managing director of the company, a post he held until his death at the age of 50, on 27 July 1937.
- During the first world war the company produces valves for the war effort including large numbers of Type R valves, a generic valve design produced by several companies.
- In 1918 the company moves to Highbury, London, to a factory called the "Aberdeen Works". (The office building which was called Cossor House is still extant, having been renamed Ladbroke House and now houses The London Screen Academy.)
- After World War I the company produces its first radio sets in kit form.
- 1924 Cossor introduces the first British valves to incorporate an oxide-coated filament.
- 1927 The company launches its famous "Melody Maker" radio set.
- 1930 First British RF pentode valve made by Cossor.
- 1932 The company introduces its first cathode ray oscilloscope.
- 1935 A Cossor cathode-ray tube is used in the receiver of the Daventry Experiment for radar research, conducted to investigate the signals produced by reflections off a Heyford bomber of the output of the BBC transmitter at Daventry.
- 1936 The company sells its first television receiver.
- 1937 Receivers for the Chain Home primary radar system, the world's first radar air defence system, are built by Cossor.
- Cossor remains pre-eminent in the development of the cathode ray oscilloscope with the introduction of a dual-beam version of the instrument.
- 1938 Cossor becomes a public limited company.
- 1938 In co-operation with the Army Cell at the Bawdsey Research Station, the company begins production development of the receiver for the GL1, the first British heavy anti-aircraft gun-laying radar.
- 1939 The company switches to war production.
- Cossor becomes involved in the early development of airborne IFF radar. The development team includes spy Arthur Wynn.
- 1943 The company moves its valve and CRT business into a new wholly owned subsidiary Electronic Tubes Ltd (ETEL) based at High Wycombe.
- 1944 In 'Plan for Post-War Broadcasting in Britain' Cossor Research Laboratory's K.I. Jones proposed 924 independent FM radio stations on frequencies outside those of the existing BBC Medium Wave AM stations.
- 1945 Secondary radar for air traffic control becomes a key area of development for Cossor.
- 1949 EMI purchases ordinary (voting) shares in ETEL, and takes management control. Cossor retains an investment in ETEL, purchasing its valve requirements from EMI and from MOV, which was jointly owned by EMI and GEC.
- 1956 Cossor disposes of its holding in ETEL sometime after 1956, and withdraws from valve and CRT manufacture.
- 1957 Cossor-made radars with detection range of almost 400 miles, capable of detecting and monitoring flight operations of individual fighter planes well inside Eastern Europe, delivered to key NATO stations along the Iron Curtain borders.
- 1958 Cossor sells its radio and television business to Philips.
- 1958 Company moves to Harlow, Essex.
- 1960 Company branched out into the missile guidance and ground support equipment field, for that purpose Cossor has hired highly qualified missile engineers from the guided weapons department of the Royal Aircraft Establishment and from Ferranti Ltd.
- 1961 Cossor is acquired by Raytheon, after making trading losses in 1959/60 had depressed the share price. These losses were reputed to be following disputes over costs of the Fylingdales BMEWS contract.

== Products and activities ==
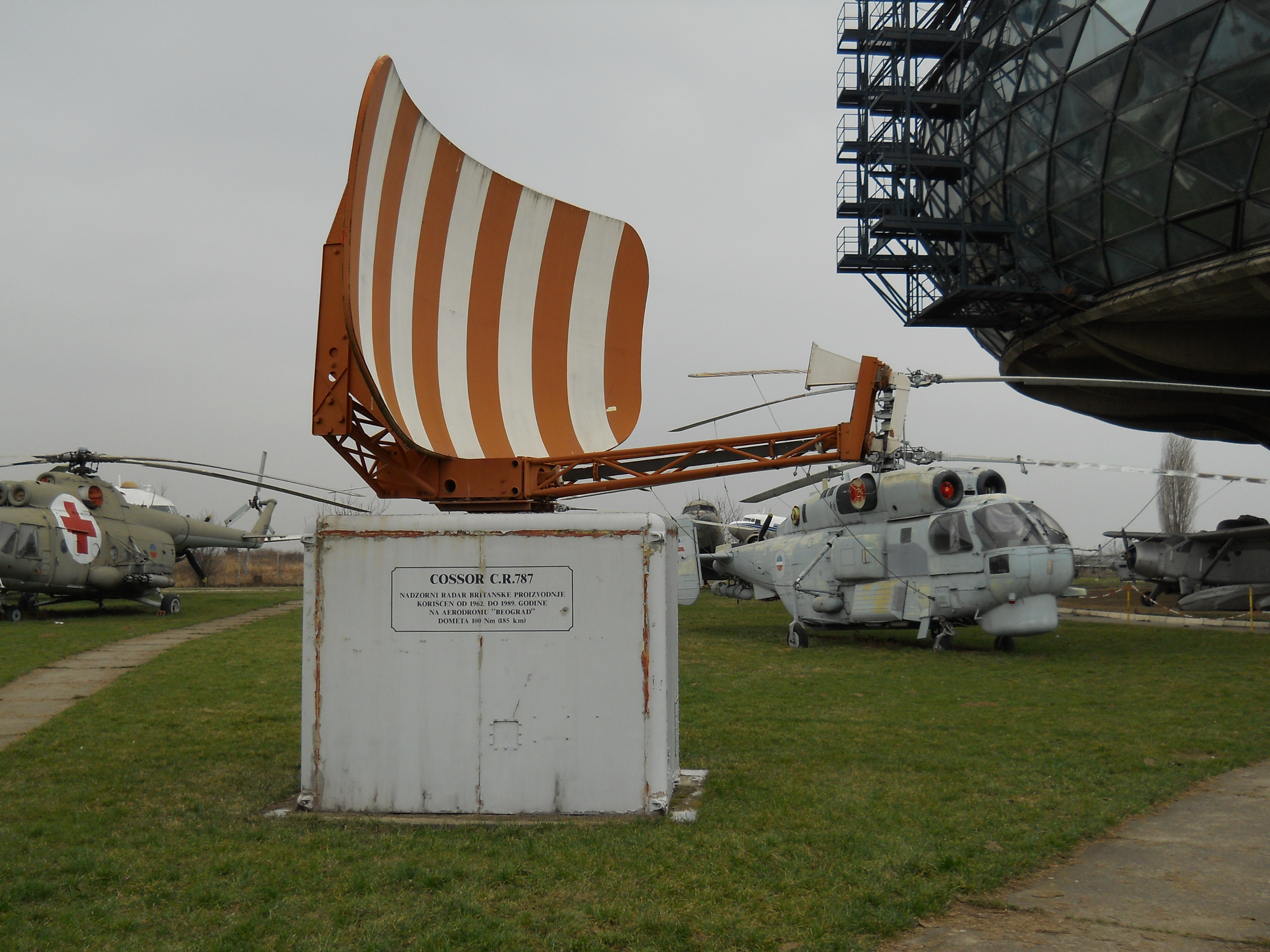
Cossor CR 787 radar

Cossor has designed IFF equipment for the British Aerospace Rapier missile, Shorts Blowpipe missile, Bofors RBS-70, Ericsson's Giraffe radar and the Contraves Italiana's LPD-20 air defence radar. Typical applications of the Cossor's IFF system include Redeye, Stinger, and SA-7 missiles and other short range air defence guns and missiles.
