= HMS Dido (F104) =

1963 Type 12I or Leander-class frigate of the Royal Navy

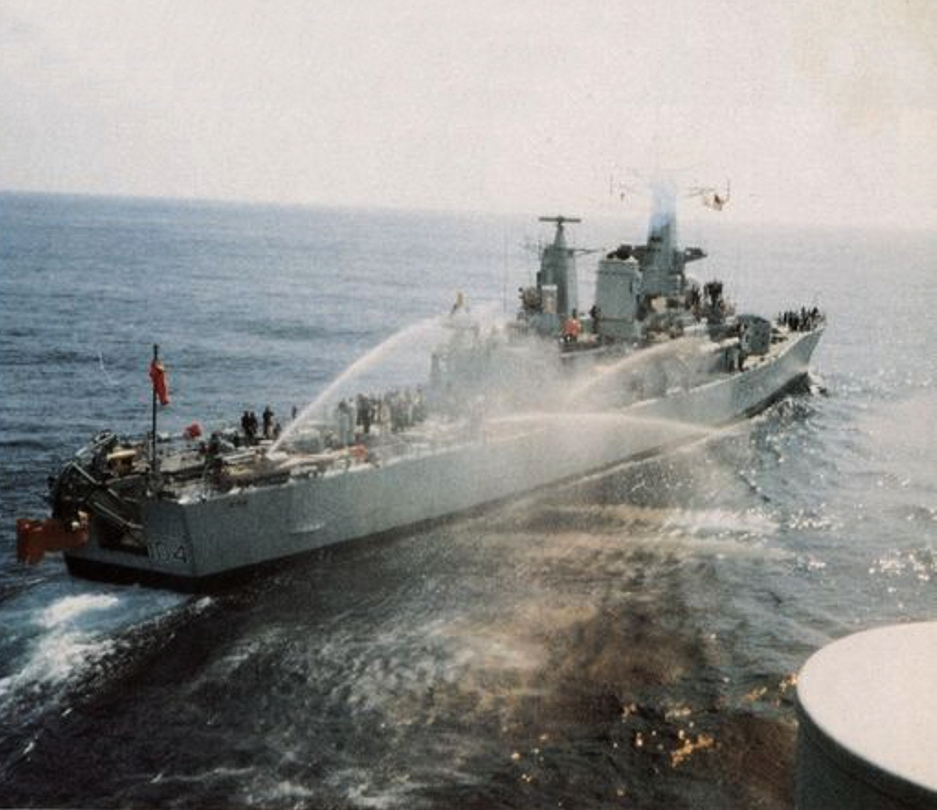
- HMS Dido in 1983

History

United Kingdom
- Name: HMS Dido
- Builder: Yarrow Shipbuilders
- Laid down: 2 December 1959
- Launched: 22 December 1961
- Commissioned: 18 September 1963
- Identification: Pennant number: F 104
- Fate: Sold to New Zealand.

New Zealand
- Name: HMNZS Southland
- Commissioned: 18 July 1983
- Decommissioned: March 1995
- Fate: Scrapped

General characteristics
- Class & type: Leander-class frigate
- Displacement: 2,450 tons standard; 3,200 tons full load
- Length: 372 ft (113 m)
- Beam: 41 ft (12 m)
- Draught: 19 ft (6 m)
- Propulsion: Two Babcock & Wilcox boilers delivering steam to two sets of White/English Electric geared turbines of 30,000 shp (22,000 kW) on two shafts
- Speed: 28 knots (52 km/h)
- Range: 4,600 nautical miles (8,500 km) at 15 knots (28 km/h)
- Complement: 18 officers and 248 sailors
- Sensors & processing systems: 1 × Type 994 air/surface search radar; 1 × Type 1006 navigation radar; 2 × Type 903/904 fire-control radars; 1 × Type 184P active search and attack sonar; 1x Type 199 Variable Depth Sonar
- Electronic warfare & decoys: CAAIS (Computer Assisted Action Information System) combat information system, ESM system with UAA-8/9 warning and Type 668/669 jamming elements.
- Armament: 2 × 4.5-inch (110 mm) L45 DP guns in one Mk 6 twin mounting; later replaced by one Ikara ASW missile launcher in circular well forward; 2 × quadruple Sea Cat anti-air missile launchers; 2 × 40-millimetre (1.6 in) Bofors guns; 2 × Mk 32 triple 12.75-inch (324 mm) mountings for Mk46 or Stingray torpedoes
- Aircraft carried: 1 × Wasp, later Lynx helicopter

HMS Dido was a Royal Navy (RN) Leander-class frigate. Entering service in 1961, Dido was involved in the Indonesia–Malaysia confrontation, served with NATO's Standing Naval Force Atlantic on several occasions, and was one of the frigates used for the filming of the drama series Warship.

Following a defence review at the start of the 1980s, the ship was transferred to the Royal New Zealand Navy (RNZN), and was recommissioned as HMNZS Southland. Southland remained in service until 1995. After decommissioning the frigate was towed to the Philippines where her boilers were removed, and then sent to India for scrapping.

== Construction ==
Dido was built by Yarrow of Glasgow. She was laid down as a Rothesay-class frigate to be called Hastings on 2 December 1959, but in 1960, it was decided to complete the ship as one of the new Leander class, with the new name Dido. The naming ceremony for Dido took place on 21 December 1961, but her launch was delayed until the next day because of fog. Dido was commissioned on 18 September 1963. Total construction cost was £4,600,000.

The ship was 372 feet (113.4 m) long overall and 360 feet (109.7 m) at the waterline, with a beam of 41 feet (12.5 m) and a maximum draught of 18 feet (5.5 m). Displacement was 2,380 long tons (2,420 t) standard and 2,860 long tons (2,910 t) full load. Two oil-fired boilers fed steam at 550 pounds per square inch (3,800 kPa) and 850 °F (454 °C) to a pair of double reduction geared steam turbines that in turn drove two propeller shafts, with the machinery rated at 30,000 shaft horsepower (22,000 kW), giving a speed of 28 knots (52 km/h; 32 mph).

A twin 4.5-inch (113 mm) Mark 6 gun mount was fitted forward. While the Leander-class was planned to be fitted with the Sea Cat surface-to-air missile, Dido was completed with two Bofors 40 mm anti-aircraft guns as a temporary substitute until Sea Cat could be fitted. A Limbo anti-submarine mortar was fitted aft to provide a short-range anti-submarine capability, while a hangar and helicopter deck allowed a single Westland Wasp helicopter to be operated, for longer range anti-submarine and anti-surface operations.

As built, Dido was fitted with a large Type 965 long range air search radar on the ship's mainmast, with a Type 993 short range air/surface target indicating radar and Type 974 navigation radar carried on the ship's foremast. An MRS3 fire control system was carried to direct the 4.5-inch guns. The ship had a sonar suite of Type 177 medium range search sonar, Type 162 bottom search and Type 170 attack sonar, together with a Type 199 variable depth sonar (VDS).

== Royal Navy Service ==
The ship was assigned to the Far East, joining the 22nd Escort Group in 1964 and took part in the Indonesia–Malaysia confrontation, and became leader of the 21st Escort Group the following year.

Dido was reassigned to the NATO Standing Naval Force Atlantic (STANAVFORLANT) in 1969 and also took part in a fleet review at Spithead on 16 May 1969 as part of the celebrations of the 20th anniversary of the formation of NATO.

The ship was one of four used as the fictional frigate HMS Hero in the 1970s BBC television drama series Warship.

Dido was extensively refitted at Devonport between July 1975 and October 1978, as a Batch 1B Ikara conversion (and the last to be completed), at a cost of £23,000,000. An Ikara ASW missile launcher replaced the 4.5-inch turret, while two Sea Cat launchers were fitted to the hangar roof. The two Bofors guns were retained but moved forward to abreast the ship's mainmast. The Limbo anti-submarine mortar and Wasp helicopter was retained. The long-range Type 965 radar was removed, with improved navigation and target indicating radars fitted, and the ADAWS 5 computer aided combat direction system added to direct Ikara operations. The ship's sonar suite remained unchanged.

After working up following the refit, Dido joined the 3rd Frigate Squadron. In 1983 the ship was briefly assigned again to the Standing Naval Force Atlantic (STANAVFORLANT).

== Royal New Zealand Navy Service ==
As a result of the 1981 Defence Review, which had recommended the disposal of some older frigates, the ship was sold to the RNZN, along with sister ship HMS Bacchante. The already 18-year-old Southland was selected mainly to train RNZN personnel on computerised command and control systems, even though the ADWAS 5 system was dated with only 4 screens and talley and a quarter of the processing capacity and screens of the later Leander and T21, C4 CAAIS. It is seen as a dubious purchase, in retrospect, and by some at the time, as an ageing, if recently refitted, 'over specialised anti submarine frigate' without any real surface armament or surveillance radar. The acquisition of the second hand frigate was also in direct conflict with the 1978 NZ Defence Review that decided that future frigates would be gas turbine powered and steam abandoned as a prime mover for RNZ combat ships.

Diesel powered long range frigates were also, offered in 1981, HMS Lynx and HMS Lincoln were rejected on account of age and lack of helicopter capability, the partly gas turbine powered HMS Zulu and HMS Norfolk which at least started and could leave port immediately, without 6/8 hours to flash up the steam boilers were rejected on the basis 'that they were already almost in the scrapyard' (they were later sold to Indonesia and Chile) and excessive manning requirements, although all had 4.5 guns and 965AW radar and in the case of HMS Norfolk, full Link 10/11 USN compatible communications, high range and Exocet missiles. The option of purchasing a second Ikara Leander was available in the general offer after the UK 1981 Defence Review, with HMS Leander, HMS Ajax and in particular HMS Naiad, completed in March 1965, also offered. Given the extremely specialised nature of the Ikara Leanders and their incompatibility with the rather different Ikara systems in the Australian Type 12 frigates and Charles F. Adams-class guided missile destroyers, the acquisition of two Ikara Leanders would actually have given a real capability, able to test and practice, joint computer age anti-submarine operations. As UK experience and UK Treasury costing already indicated that the 13-year-old Bacchante was too old for cost-containable structural modernisation, a view also held by the former captain of HMNZS Waikato, Southland received a five-month, $15 million refit at Vosper Thornycroft after recommissioning on 18 July 1983 as HMNZS Southland. During the refit the Limbo mortar and VDS were removed as were the associated 170 and 199 sonars, while US Mk 32 torpedo tubes for anti-submarine torpedoes were fitted. The refit was completed in late December 1983 and over the following months, Southland had several workups at Portland and participated in a number of Royal Navy and NATO exercises before sailing for New Zealand in mid-1984. An earlier HMS Dido already had historical links with Southland.

== Decommissioning and fate ==
Around 1986 extensive plans were drawn up for a major refit of Southland which would have allowed its Ikara capability to remain operational until the mid-1990s. The RN had significantly modernised one of its remaining Ikara Leanders, Arethusa at the time with long range 2031 towed array capable of passive detection in the 160 km + range zone. The Royal Australian Navy planned to continue with its similar, but incompatible, Ikara system for a while. However quotes for refitting Southland in UK yards or at Lyttleton proved high, the Cold War effectively ended in 1989 and with the RN and USN withdrawing its stock of nuclear depth charges, (the intended warhead option for RN Ikara Leanders to attack Soviet submarines at 10–20 kilometres (5.4–10.8 nmi) range, where two directional sound transmission times were probably too great for accurate proximity direction of Ikara carrying MK 46 torpedoes) meant Ikara was no longer useful to the Royal Navy. As a result, the Ikara system was withdrawn from RNZN use in 1989 with space found for a low cost refit at the RNZN dockyard for it to continue as a General Purpose frigate until 1993.

Decommissioned on 1 March 1995, in November 1995 Southland was towed away by two patrol craft to the Philippines where her boilers were removed for a rubber plantation. She was then towed to Singapore where she was sold to an Indian tug company who took her to Goa beach in India. She was pulled up on the beach and her parts were sold.

== See also ==
- Frigates of the Royal New Zealand Navy

== Publications ==
- Colledge, J. J.; Warlow, Ben (2006) [1969]. Ships of the Royal Navy: The Complete Record of All Fighting Ships of the Royal Navy from the 15th Century to the Present (3rd Rev ed.). London: Chatham Publishing. ISBN 978-1-86176-281-8. OCLC 67375475.
- Marriott, Leo, 1983. Royal Navy Frigates 1945-1983, Ian Allan Ltd. ISBN 07110 1322 5
- Osborne, Richard; Sowdon, David (1990). Leander Class Frigates. Kendal, UK: World Ships Society. ISBN 0-905617-56-8.
- "The Official HMS Dido Association". Archived from the original on 8 October 2007.
- "Leander Class General Purpose Frigate (Type 12 Improved)". The Royal Navy Postwar. Archived from the original on 12 December 2006.
