= HMS Euryalus (F15) =

1964 Type 12I or Leander-class frigate of the Royal Navy

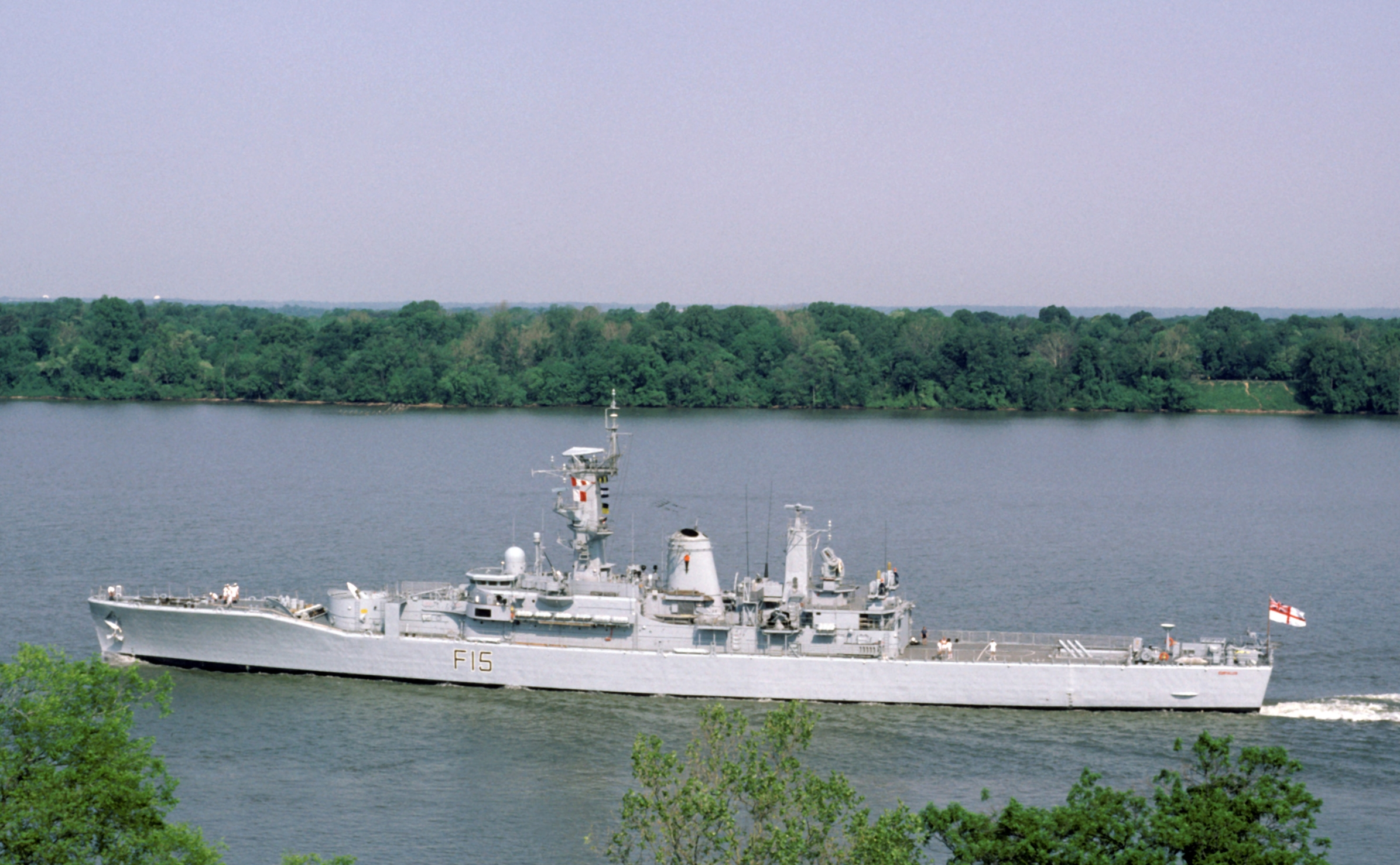

History

United Kingdom
- Name: HMS Euryalus (F15)
- Operator: Royal Navy
- Builder: Scotts
- Laid down: 2 November 1961
- Launched: 6 June 1963
- Commissioned: 16 September 1964
- Decommissioned: 31 March 1989
- Motto: Omnia Audax; ("Daring in all things")
- Fate: Sold for scrap, 1990

General characteristics
- Class & type: Leander-class frigate
- Displacement: 2,450 long tons (2,489 t) standard; 2,860 long tons (2,906 t) full load
- Length: 372 ft 10 in (113.64 m)
- Beam: 48 ft 4 in (14.73 m)
- Draught: 21 ft 9 in (6.63 m)
- Propulsion: 2 × Yarrow Y100 HS Superheat Boilers; 2 × Admiralty Steam Turbine units, 44,000 shp (33 MW)
- Speed: 33.6 knots (62.2 km/h; 38.7 mph)
- Range: 3,470 nmi (6,430 km) at 15 kn (28 km/h; 17 mph)
- Complement: 256
- Armament: 1 × Ikara ASW rocket; 2 × Sea Cat; 2 × 40 mm Bofors guns
- Aircraft carried: 1 × Wasp HAS Mk1 helicopter

HMS Euryalus (F15) was a Leander-class frigate of the Royal Navy (RN). Like the rest of the class, Euryalus was named after a figure of mythology. Euryalus was built by Scotts Shipbuilders of Greenock. Euryalus was launched on 6 June 1963, and commissioned on 16 September 1964.

This Euryalus was the sixth of the name and had a strong liaison with the Lancashire Fusiliers, whose motto (Omnia Audax) she bore from the 4th Euryalus landing its 1st Battalion at W Beach, Gallipoli, where the Regiment "won six Victoria Crosses before breakfast".

== Service history ==
=== 1964–1969 ===
On commissioning Euryalus became Leader of the 26th Escort Squadron which was based in the Far East. While based in the Far East, Euryalus took part in Indonesian Confrontation, with Euryalus having few incidents during her participation in the conflict, mainly patrolling the waters around Borneo.

In 1966 Euryalus recommissioned and went into refit in Devonport. In April 1967, after work up, she joined STANAVFORLANT, visiting Norway (Bodø and Tromsø), Sweden (Stockholm), Iceland, Newport, Rhode Island, Canada (Halifax for the Canadian Centennial), Montreal for Expo 67, Quebec and St John's Newfoundland. She deployed to the Far East in December 1967 as Leader of the 1st Frigate Squadron and spent Christmas in Simonstown (South Africa).

Early in 1968 she carried out a six-week Beira Patrol followed by a week on Internal Security duty in Mauritius which was approaching independence, which had caused the different racial groups there to jostle violently for position. This deployment to the Far East continued with visits to Sydney, Auckland, Vila in the New Hebrides, Tsuruga and Yokohama in Japan, and Hong Kong, Indonesia, Sabah and Singapore before returning home in December 1968 via Auckland, Fiji, Pearl Harbor, San Diego and the Panama Canal.

In 1969, Euryalus again returned to the Far East, which also had a substantial Royal Navy presence at the time.

=== 1970–1979 ===
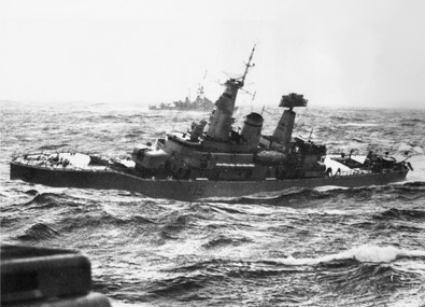
Euryalus in the Bay of Biscay, 1972

In 1970, Euryalus became the Gibraltar guard ship, a role that a number of Leanders performed. In 1972, Euryalus undertook a Beira Patrol, designed to prevent oil reaching Rhodesia via Mozambique. The following year, Euryalus began her modernisation at Devonport Dockyard, which included the removal of her twin 4.5-in gun to accommodate the Australian-designed Ikara anti-submarine warfare (ASW) missile system. The modernisation was completed in 1976.

In 1977, the highlight of the year was the taking part in June of the Fleet Review of the Royal Navy, in celebration of HM the Queen's Silver Jubilee. She was positioned in the middle of her sister-ships Scylla and Danae.

In 1978, Euryalus was a member of the 2nd Frigate Squadron (F2) more commonly known as the Portland Training Squadron, spending most of her time in and around Portland Naval base. She took part in various exercises, including the dreaded "Thursday War", helping to train warships and auxiliaries of the Royal and Foreign navies as part of maintaining their operational effectiveness. However it was not all work and no play as she carried out visits to Bayonne in France, Aalborg in Denmark, and a "Meet the Navy" visit to her adopted town of South Shields where she took part in the activities to commemorate the wartime exploits of HMS Kelly, the highlight of which was a visit by Earl Mountbatten of Burma.

=== 1980–1989 ===
In 1981, Euryalus undertook a Middle East patrol during the tense times in that region, specifically the Iran–Iraq War which had begun the previous year. In 1982, Euryalus, along with her sister-ship Leander, came to the aid of the Portuguese vessel MV Ave Maria which was ablaze off the Essex coast, rescuing 45 people.

In February 1984, Euryalus joined the Standing Naval Force Atlantic (STANAVFORLANT), a NATO multi-national squadron, relieving the destroyer Glasgow. In 1986, Euryalus became the leader of the 1st Frigate Squadron. Euryalus decommissioned on 31 March 1989 and was bought by Devonport Management Limited with the intention of then selling her to a foreign navy, but this was not to be, and in 1990, Euryalus was sold for scrap and broken up at Millom in Cumbria alongside HMS Ajax.

== Publications ==
- Colledge, J. J.; Warlow, Ben (2006) [1969]. Ships of the Royal Navy: The Complete Record of All Fighting Ships of the Royal Navy from the 15th Century to the Present (3rd Rev ed.). London: Chatham Publishing. ISBN 978-1-86176-281-8. OCLC 67375475.
- Critchley, Mike (1992). British Warships Since 1945: Part 5: Frigates. Liskeard, UK: Maritime Press. ISBN 0-907771-13-0.
- Marriott, Leo, 1983. Royal Navy Frigates 1945-1983, Ian Allan Ltd. ISBN 07110 1322 5
