= F38 =

F38 or F-38 may refer to:

- F38 (classification), a disability sport classification
- F-38 (Michigan county highway)
- HMS Arethusa (F38), a Leander-class frigate of the Royal Navy
