= Kenneth Snow =

Royal Navy Rear Admiral (1934–2011)

Rear-Admiral Kenneth Snow CB
- Born: 1934
- Died: 5 December 2011 (aged 76–77)

Rear-Admiral Kenneth Arthur Snow, CB (1934 – 5 December 2011) was a flag officer in the Royal Navy.

== Early life ==
Snow went to St. Andrew's College, Grahamstown, South Africa and was in Merriman House. In 1950 Snow went to the South African Nautical College 'General Botha' at Gordons Bay, Cape Province where he had a distinguished career - Chief Cadet Captain and King's Gold Medallist 1951.

== Naval career ==
With the rank of Commander, Snow was captain of the ship HMS Llandaff. He also served as captain of HMS Arethusa from 1978 to 1981. Snow was promoted to Rear admiral on 3 July 1984.

== Other work ==
Snow was a member of Westminster Abbey's College as Deputy High Bailiff, and also as Receiver General of Westminster Abbey between 1987 and 1998. Snow's ashes were interred in Westminster Abbey on 17 March 2012.

== Honours and awards ==
Snow was invested as a Companion of the Order of the Bath in the 1987 New Year Honours.
