= HMS Galatea (F18) =

1964 Type 12I or Leander-class frigate of the Royal Navy

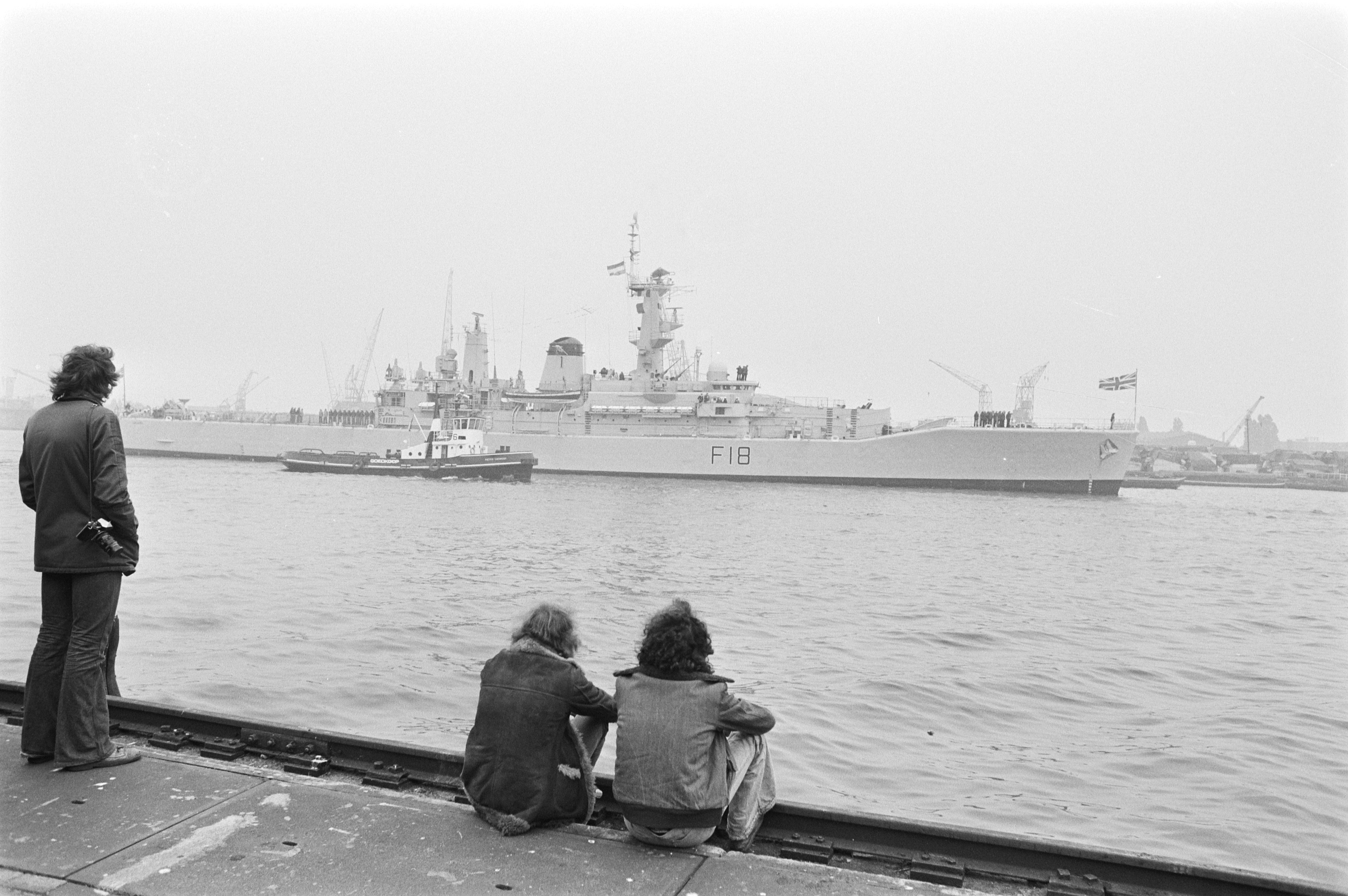

History

United Kingdom
- Name: Galatea
- Builder: Swan Hunter
- Laid down: 29 December 1961
- Launched: 23 May 1963
- Commissioned: 25 April 1964
- Decommissioned: 31 January 1987
- Motto: Nobis Mare Patria
- Fate: Sunk as target, 21 July 1988

General characteristics
- Class & type: Leander-class frigate
- Displacement: 2,450 tons
- Length: 372 ft (113 m)
- Beam: 41 ft (12 m)
- Draught: 18 ft (5.5 m)
- Propulsion: Twin oil-fired steam turbines, 30,000 hp (22,000 kW)
- Speed: 30 knots (56 km/h; 35 mph) max
- Range: 4,600 nmi (8,500 km; 5,300 mi)
- Complement: 251 (257 after Ikara upgrade)
- Armament: Twin 4.5-inch (114 mm) guns (subsequently replaced by Ikara anti-submarine missile launcher); 2 × 40 mm anti-aircraft guns; Limbo antisubmarine mortar
- Aircraft carried: Wasp helicopter

HMS Galatea (F18) was a Leander-class frigate of the Royal Navy. She was built by Swan Hunter & Wigham on the Tyne. She was launched on 23 May 1963 and commissioned on 25 April 1964 and was the eighth ship of the Royal Navy to bear the name.

== First deployments ==
Upon her commission, Galatea was immediately stationed in the Mediterranean Sea. The following year, Galatea was involved in exercises in that region, and in 1966 joined the 27th Escort Group which were also based in the Mediterranean. Later that year, Galatea returned to United Kingdom waters when she joined the Home Fleet. In 1968, Galatea was present with HMS Dainty in West Germany during the Kiel Week event, which combines a yachting race and festival entertainment. In the same year she took part in Portsmouth 'Navy Days'.

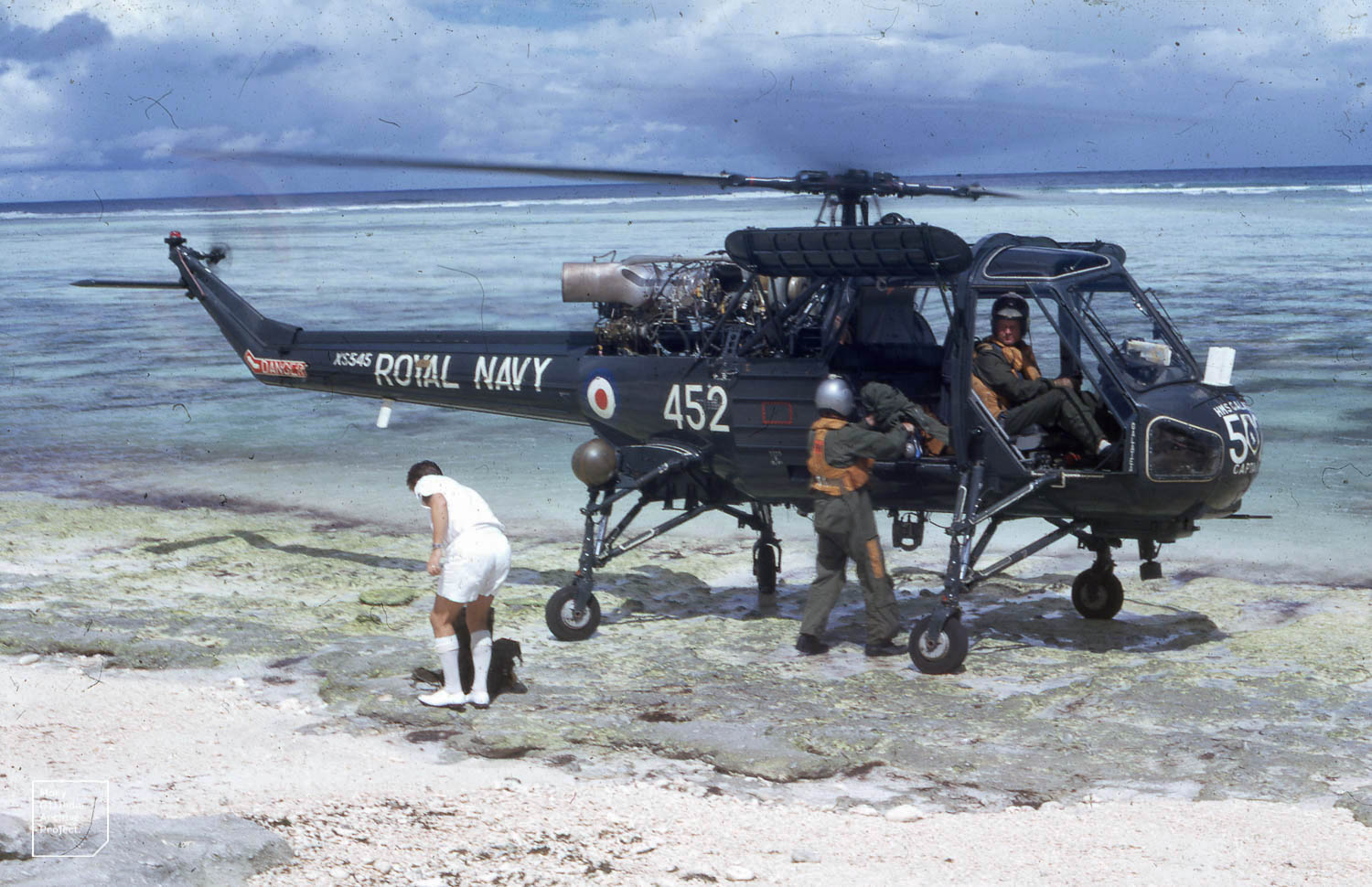
Gatatea's Wasp helicopter landing personnel on Aldabra atoll, Indian Ocean in 1970

== Refitting and Cod Wars ==
In 1971, Galatea began a period of refit and modernisation, which included the installation of the Ikara and Sea Cat weapons systems. The refit was completed in 1974. The following year, Galatea was engaged in operations during the Third Cod War with Iceland, patrolling against possible Icelandic interference with British fishing trawlers. On 26 March 1976, Galatea collided with the stern of the Icelandic Coast Guard vessel Baldur, damaging the frigate's bow.

== Galatea's last decade ==
In 1977, Galatea underwent a refit after participating in a Fleet Review, in honour of Queen Elizabeth II's Silver Jubilee. Galatea, leader of the 1st Frigate Squadron, was positioned between her sister ship Phoebe and the cruiser Blake.

In 1978, Galatea returned to the Mediterranean, where a number of patrols and exercises were undertaken. Much of 1980 was spent in the Far East, but a planned nine-month deployment ended with the start of the Iran–Iraq War. In 1981, Galatea refitted in Gibraltar before deploying to the Persian Gulf on Armilla Patrol, where she remained until about 1983. The frigate decommissioned in January 1987 and was sunk as a target in July 1988, as part of naval exercises in the North Atlantic.

== Commanding officers ==
Notable commanding officers include Henry Leach from 1965 to 1967 and Anthony (Tony) John Cooke between 1969 and 1971.

== Publications ==
- Colledge, J. J.; Warlow, Ben (2006) [1969]. Ships of the Royal Navy: The Complete Record of All Fighting Ships of the Royal Navy from the 15th Century to the Present (3rd Rev ed.). London: Chatham Publishing. ISBN 978-1-86176-281-8. OCLC 67375475.
- Jackson, Robert "Fighting Ships of The World." London: Amber Books Ltd, 2004 Pg. 277 ISBN 9781840136470
- Marriott, Leo, 1983. Royal Navy Frigates 1945-1983, Ian Allan Ltd. ISBN 07110 1322 5
