= Ikara (missile) =

Anti-submarine missile

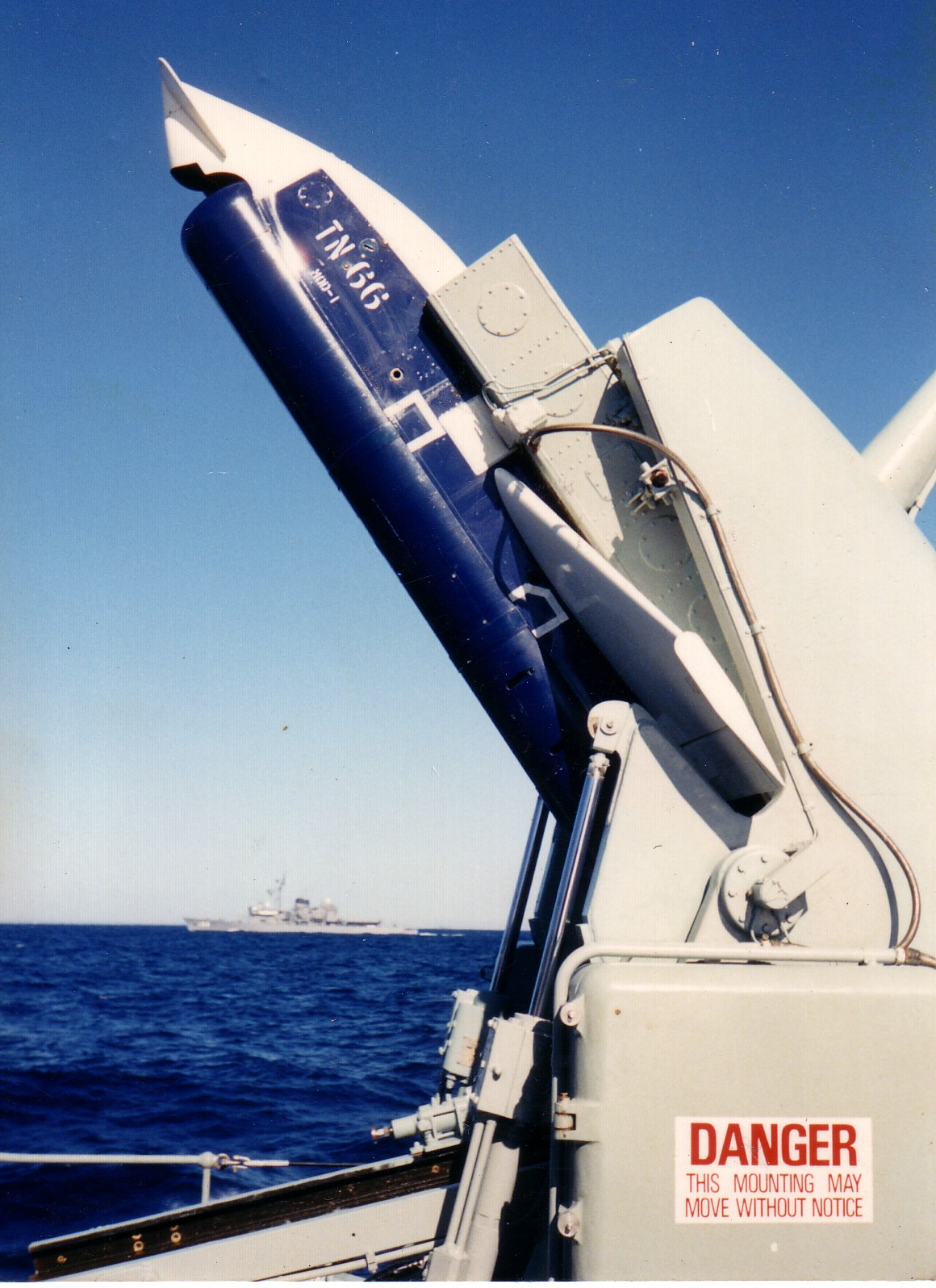
- Ikara test missile on launcher
- Type: Anti-submarine missile
- Place of origin: Australia

Service history
- In service: 1960s–1990s
- Used by: Royal Australian Navy; Brazilian Navy; Chilean Navy; Royal New Zealand Navy; Royal Navy

Production history
- Designed: Circa 1959–60
- Manufacturer: Australian Government Aircraft Factories/Commonwealth Aircraft Corporation (CAC)/Australian Defence Scientific Services (ADSS)
- Produced: Early 1960s
- Variants: Two: Royal Australian Navy, Royal Navy

Specifications
- Mass: 513 kilograms (1,131 lb)
- Length: 3.429 metres (135.0 in)
- Wingspan: 1.524 metres (60.0 in)
- Warhead: Mark 44 (two versions); Mark 46; NDB (Nuclear Depth Bomb).
- Detonation mechanism: none
- Engine: Bristol Aerojet Murawa two-stage solid-fuel rocket engine.
- Operational range: Maximum range: 10 nautical miles (19 km); Minimum (safety) range: 914 metres (1,000 yd)
- Flight ceiling: 335 metres (1,099 ft)
- Maximum speed: Boost max: 713 kilometres per hour (443 mph); Cruise: 658 kilometres per hour (409 mph); Maximum boost acceleration: 10.9G; Boost burn time: 1.96 seconds Launcher maximum elevation: 55° Maximum range time interval: 100 sec.
- Guidance system: Command guidance
- Steering system: Elevons
- Launch platform: Ship-borne

The Ikara missile was an Australian ship-launched anti-submarine missile, named after an Australian Aboriginal word for "throwing stick". It launched an acoustic torpedo to a range of 10 nautical miles (12 mi; 19 km), allowing fast-reaction attacks against submarines at ranges that would otherwise require the launching ship to close for attack, placing itself at risk. By flying to a distant target, the engagement time was dramatically shorter than provided by short-range weapons, giving the target less time to respond.

== Design and development ==
With the development of nuclear power, submarine performance, especially speed, improved dramatically, as did the threat they posed. Simultaneously, sonar detection capability at long range was also improving significantly, but only short-range weapons were available to surface escort warships. The final British development of the A/S mortar was the Limbo mortar, able to fire in all directions but limited to a maximum range of 914 metres (2,999 ft).

Known initially under the Rainbow Code name Blue Duck, the Ikara was a "rocket-thrown weapon" with similarities to the French Malafon. It differed from Malafon in that the torpedo was semi-recessed in the missile body rather than mounted in the nose. Ikara's range at 10 nautical miles (12 mi; 19 km) was double that of the American ASROC. Ikara was generally considered a superior system to ASROC as it was accurately guided during flight to ensure optimal targeting.

A submarine would be aware from sonar contacts that it was about to be attacked and could engage in evasive changes of course. In ASROC's flight time to maximum range of 55 seconds, a submarine travelling at 25 knots (29 mph; 46 km/h) could move 700 metres (2,300 ft) from its position at launch, and a prediction would be made of the submarine's likely position at torpedo splashdown. But during the design of Ikara around 1960 the range of the acoustic seeker of the Mk.44 torpedo was limited to 457 metres (1,499 ft), and consequently its kill probability was low. The range of the acoustic seeker was later improved.

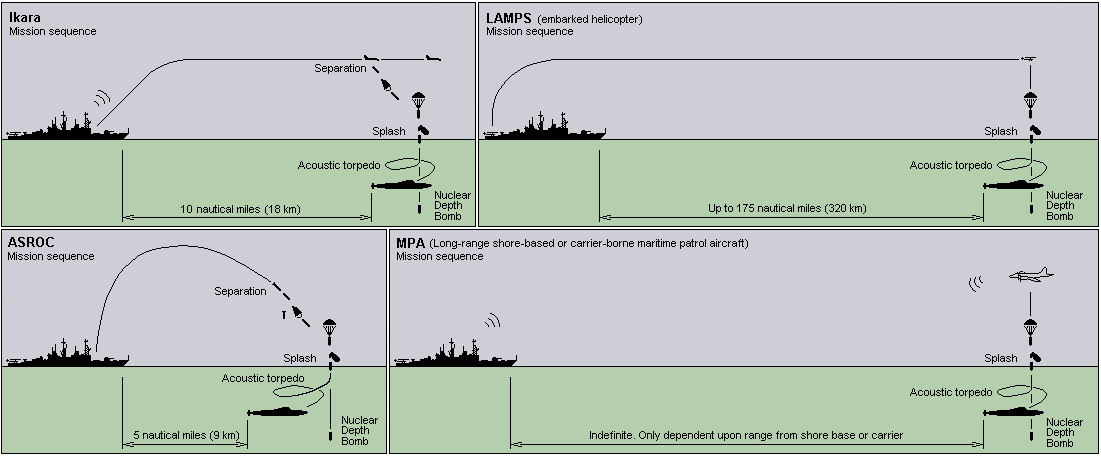
The four principal methods of delivering an acoustic homing torpedo or a Nuclear Depth Bomb at long range from a surface escort. Only the rocket-thrown weapons (ASROC and Ikara) are available for use in all-weather conditions and at instant readiness.

Ikara was guided by radio command link until it reached the vicinity of the submarine, determined by the ship's sonar contact, where it would first jettison the rear ventral fin and torpedo rear covering and then release its 12.7 inch Mark 44 or Mark 46 acoustically-guided anti-submarine torpedo. The torpedo payload would descend by parachute while the missile itself was programmed to splash down some distance away to avoid interference with the acoustic torpedo's seeker head. The torpedo would then begin a circular search pattern to find and lock onto a submarine contact.

Ikara was powered by a two-stage in-line solid-fuel Murawa rocket engine developed by Bristol Aerojet Ltd in the UK.

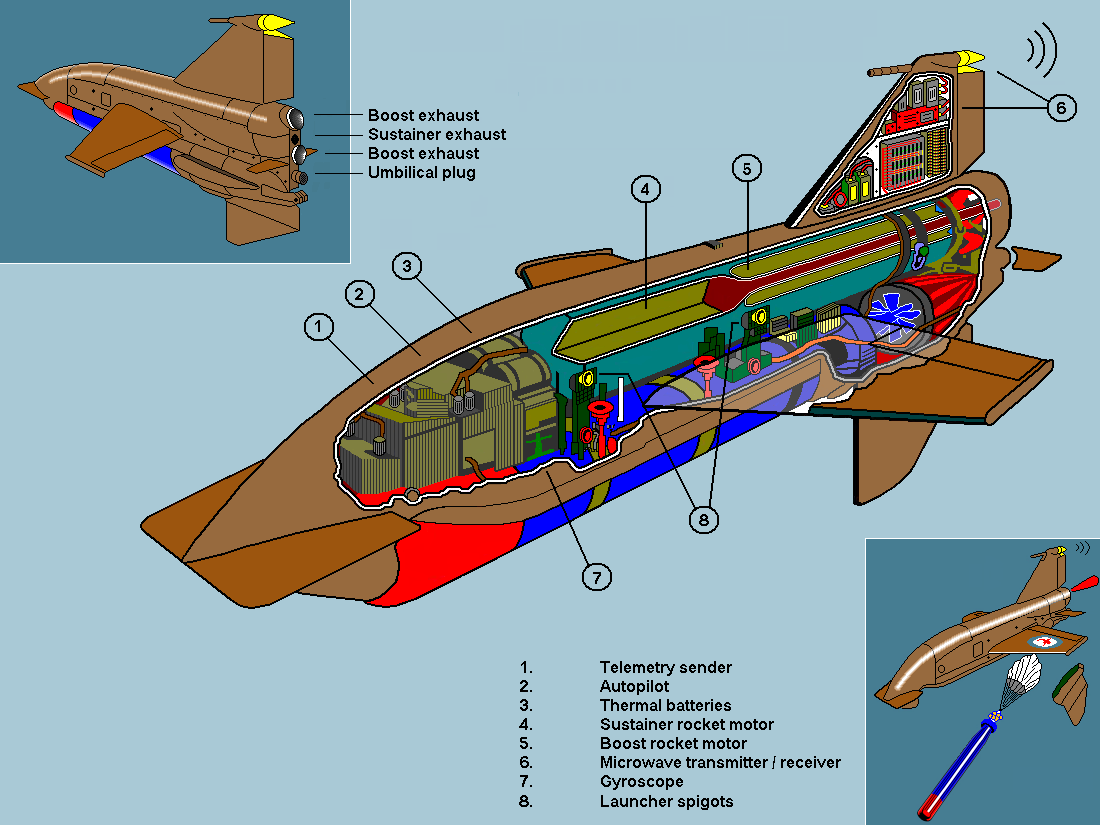
Cutaway drawing of the Ikara missile largely based on declassified documents located in the National Archives, London, and photographs taken by the artist of museum exhibits at the Bristol Aero Collection at RAF Kemble and the Royal Navy Submarine Museum, Gosport, Hampshire, UK.

The Turana target drone was designed and built in Australia as a development of the Ikara anti-submarine weapon system. It was a target drone with remote control that was launched from the Ikara launcher for use in naval anti-aircraft target practice.

In 1982, work began on an improved version, the Super Ikara. This was to be turbojet-powered to give a maximum range of 100 km (54 nmi; 62 mi), and would be carried in, and launched from a container. While test launches were carried out in 1986, the project was abandoned due to a lack of interest from the UK.

== British variant differences ==
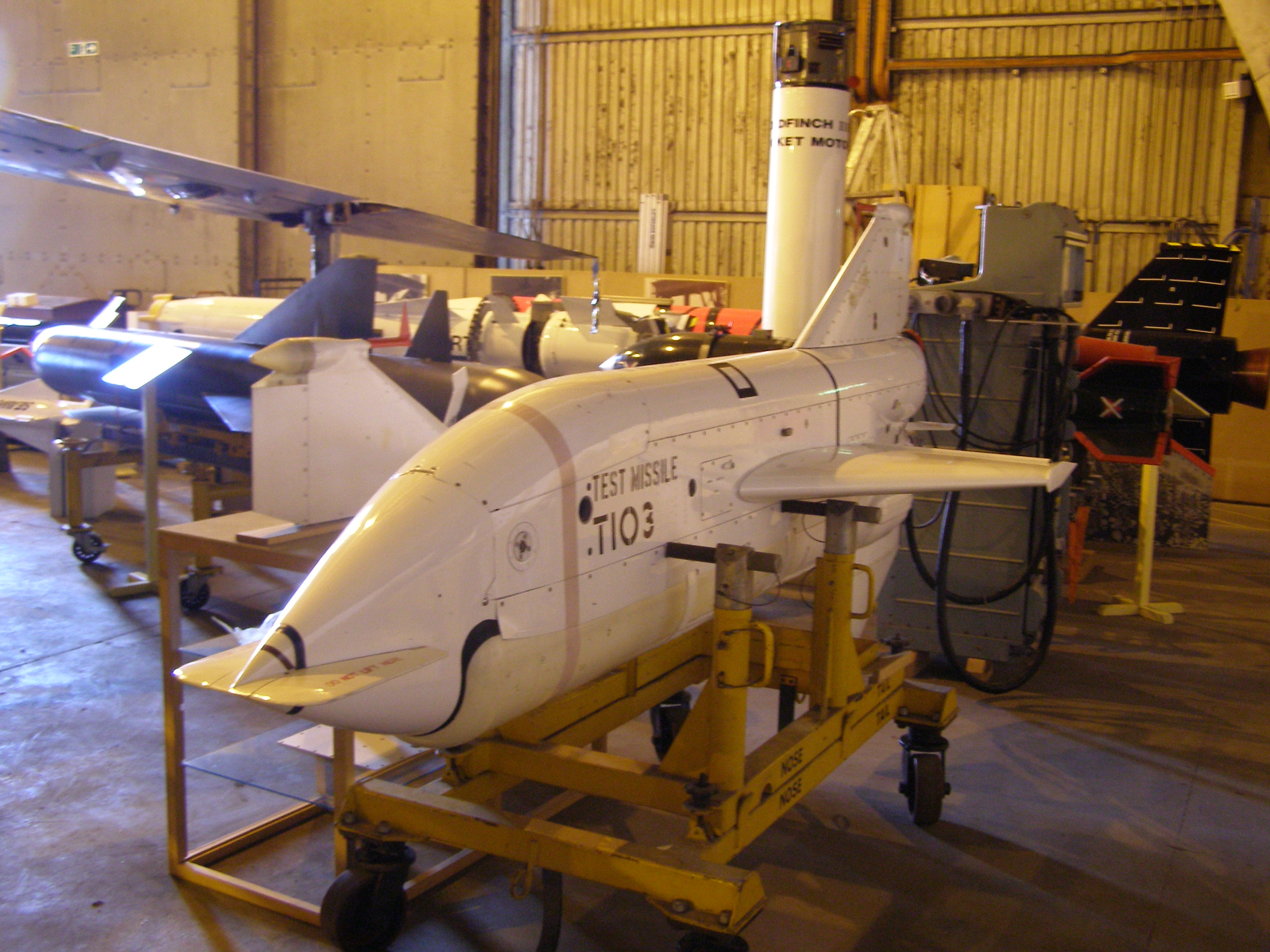
Test missile on display at Bristol Aero Collection, Kemble, England

A variant fitted to the Royal Navy's Leander-class frigates differed in several respects from the original Australian version designed to operate in the Pacific.

The Royal Navy required changes to the frequencies used in order to enable Ikara to be used in the NATO area, where different electronic warfare conditions and international frequency agreements had to be taken into account.

Neither the Australian-built analogue computer system, nor the American Bunker Ramo Corporation 133 digital computer system, used in most RAN systems, was compatible with the ADA digital battle-control computers being fitted into Royal Navy ships, and this was also changed. The UK-manufactured version of the Mark 44 torpedo also differed from the US-built version purchased by the Australians for their Ikara missiles.

The British also required the missile payload to be changeable aboard ship to permit different payload combinations to be used, including a nuclear depth bomb (NDB) option, and this, together with the different internal ship layouts, required further changes to the missile, storage and handling arrangements.

The Australian practice was to combine the missile and payload at a shore-based ordnance facility and issue the complete unit to a ship; repair or maintenance was only possible ashore. In the British ships, the changes made enabled a faulty torpedo on a missile in working order to be replaced, increasing the flexibility of use of very limited stocks aboard; especially on lengthy deployments around the globe, as was more common with British ships than their Australian counterparts.

The facility to change a torpedo payload aboard ship also permitted a change from a conventional torpedo to a WE.177A NDB, a facility for a nuclear option that was not needed on ships fitted with the Australian variant of Ikara.

The British launcher also differed, covered by a zareba (breakwater) when not in use to prevent icing in northern waters, and extremely accurate in training in bearing. It was also notoriously noisy.

== Ikara-fitted ships ==
Ikara was fitted to all of the Royal Australian Navy (RAN) River-class frigates/destroyer escorts and Perth-class guided-missile destroyers. There were three main variants of the system fitted to RAN ships: F1, F2, and F3. The F1 system, using an analogue computer, a single launcher and without a data link, was fitted to HMA Ships Stuart and Derwent only. The F3 system, with a digital computer, digital display, single launcher and a digital data link, was fitted to the other four River class ships. HMAS Stuart and Derwent were fitted with F3/0 systems during half-life refits during the 1980s.

The F2 system, using a digital computer, digital display, two launchers and with a digital data link, was fitted to the three Perth-class destroyers. The digital computer used by the RAN was the AN/UYK-1 NTDS (Naval Tactical Data System) (Bunker Ramo 133). The Ikara missile was withdrawn from service by the RAN in 1991.

Ikara was also operated by the Brazilian Navy, Royal Navy, and Royal New Zealand Navy. It was phased out in the early 1990s due to the obsolescence of the Mk 44 torpedo and inability to carry the newer and heavier Mk 46 or Sting Ray.

The British purchased Ikara to fit to the two new CVA-01 aircraft carriers planned (and later cancelled) in the 1960s, and their escorts, the Type 82 destroyers, of which only one, HMS Bristol was built. With the cancellation of the remaining escorts, the British were left with purchased Ikara missiles in storage, and opted to fit them into eight existing Batch 1 Leander-class frigates in need of modernisation: HM ships Ajax, Arethusa, Aurora, Dido, Euryalus, Galatea, Leander and Naiad.

== Operators ==
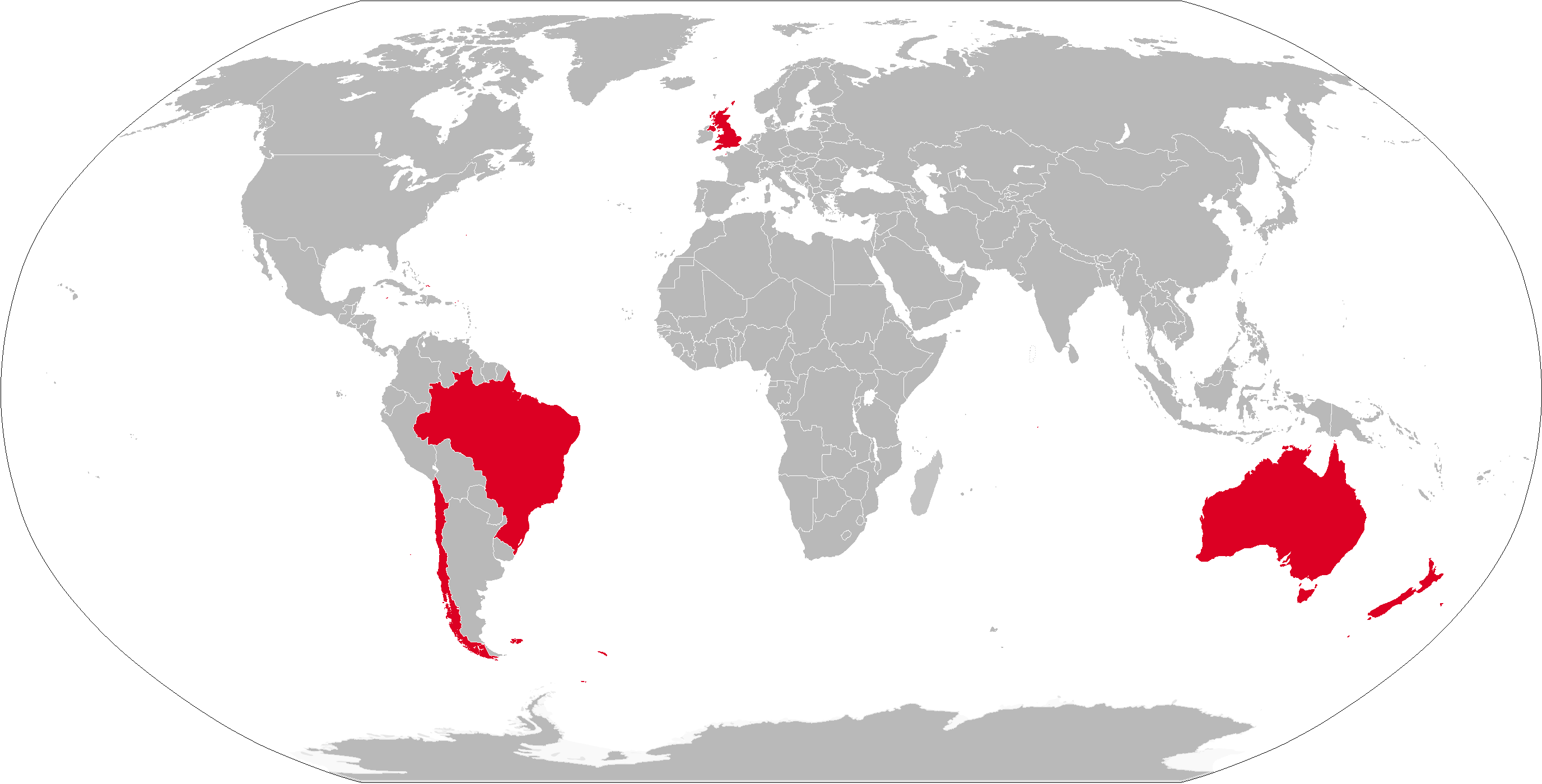
Map with former Ikara operators in red.

=== Former operators ===
Australia

- Royal Australian Navy

Brazil

- Brazilian Navy

Chile

- Chilean Navy

New Zealand

- Royal New Zealand Navy

United Kingdom

- Royal Navy
