= GAF Turana =

Turana

General information
- Type: Target Drone
- National origin: Australia
- Manufacturer: Government Aircraft Factories
- Primary user: Royal Australian Navy
- Number built: 23

History
- Manufactured: late 1960s - 1979
- First flight: August 1971
- Developed from: Ikara (missile)

The GAF Turana was a target drone produced by the Australian Government Aircraft Factories (GAF). The name is believed to be from an Aboriginal Australian word meaning rainbow.

The Turana target drone was designed and built in Australia as a development of the Ikara anti-submarine weapon system. It was a target drone with remote control that was launched from the Ikara launcher for use in naval anti-aircraft target practice.

== Design and development ==
The Turana had a composite metal/fibre glass structure and was powered by a Microturbo Cougar 022 Turbojet. (Note: The engine was designed so that it can be reused for at least 10 flights even after being submerged in water for an hour before being recovered)

The Turana was first flown from Woomera in August 1971. The program was cancelled in 1979 as water ingress during recovery of the drone was causing failure of the electronics.

== See also ==
- List of unmanned aerial vehicles
