= HMS Naiad (F39) =

1965 Type 12I or Leander-class frigate of the Royal Navy

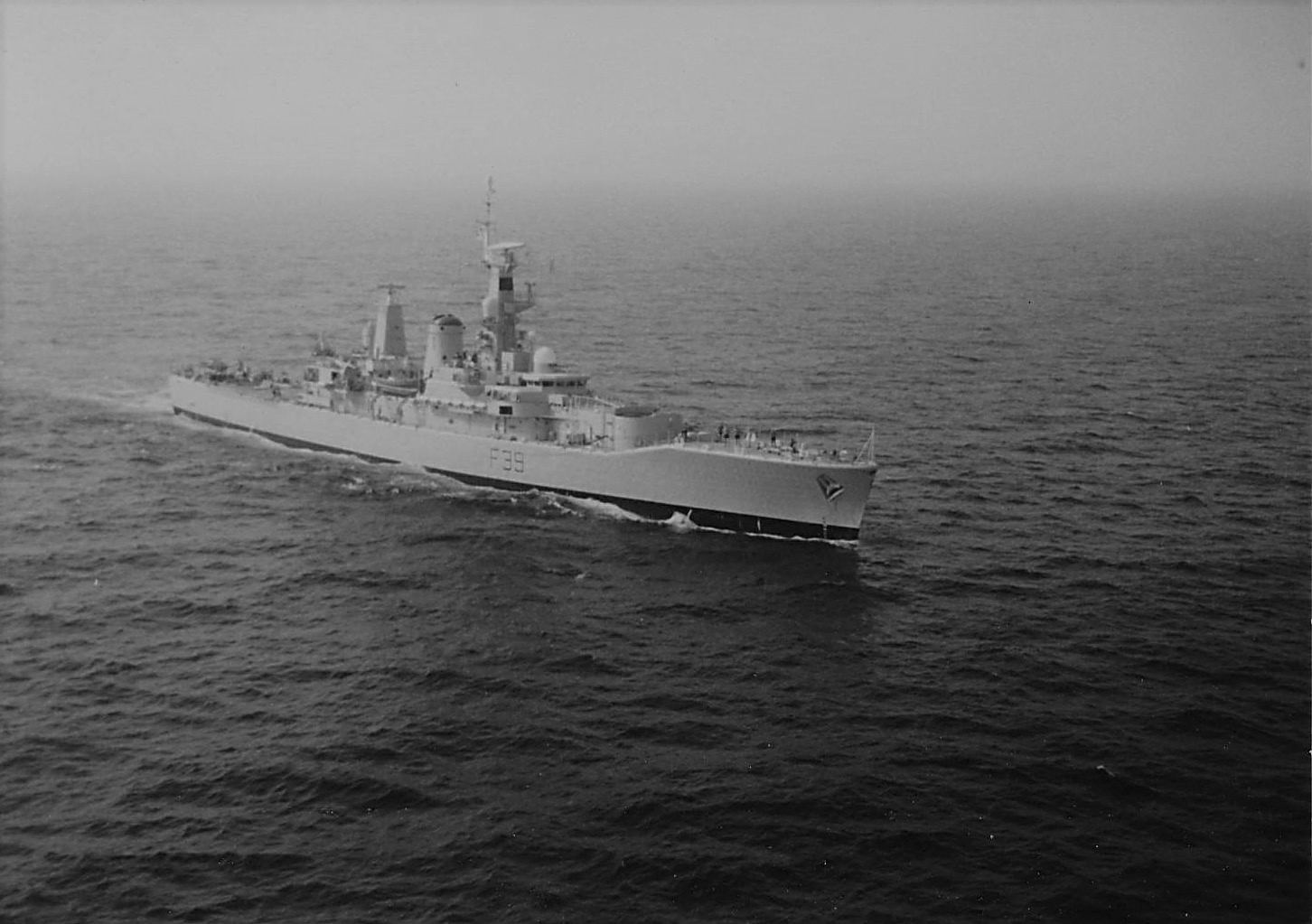

History

United Kingdom
- Name: HMS Naiad (F39)
- Operator: Royal Navy
- Builder: Yarrow Shipbuilders
- Laid down: 30 October 1962
- Launched: 4 November 1963
- Commissioned: 17 March 1965 at Scotstoun
- Decommissioned: April 1987
- Fate: Sunk as a target, 1990

General characteristics
- Class & type: Leander-class frigate
- Displacement: 2,500 tons (later 2,790 tons) standard; 2,962 tons (later 3,300 tons) full load
- Length: 372 ft (113 m)
- Beam: 43 ft (13 m)
- Draught: 14 ft 10 in (4.52 m)
- Propulsion: 2 Babcock & Wilcox oil-fired boilers, geared steam turbines delivering 22,370 kW (30,000 shp) to two shafts.
- Speed: 27 knots (50 km/h)
- Range: 7,400 km (4,600 miles) at 15 knots (28 km/h)
- Complement: 260
- Sensors & processing systems: Radar; Type 965 (air warning radar removed in batch 1 ships), Type 992 Q, Type 903, Type 974/978; Sonar; Type 162,184,199, later type 2031 towed array sonar
- Armament: Initial; 2 x 4.5 inch guns (1 twin mounting Mk6); 1 x Seacat surface-to-air missile launcher; 2 x 20mm guns (single mountings); 1 x ASW Limbo mortar; As refitted (1973-5); 1 x Ikara Anti submarine missile launcher; 2 x Seacat surface-to-air missile launchers; 2 x 40mm guns - single mountings; 2 x triple 324 mm (12.75) STWS-1 tubes for Mk 46 and Stingray ASW torpedoes; 1 x Limbo ASW Mortar
- Aircraft carried: One Westland Wasp ASW helicopter

HMS Naiad (F39) was a Leander-class frigate of the Royal Navy (RN). Like the rest of the class, Naiad was named after a figure or figure of mythology, in this case, the Naiads of Greek mythology. Naiad was built by Yarrow Shipbuilders of Scotstoun. She was launched on 4 November 1963 and commissioned on 15 March 1965.

== Operational service ==
In 1966, Naiad became the leader of the Northern Ireland Squadron and subsequently deployed to the Far East and South America. In June 1966 she was present at Kieler Woche (Kiel Week, in West Germany) and the Duke of Edinburgh held a state dinner on board in honour of West German President Heinrich Lubke. On 4 May 1967, she recommissioned for a general service commission and was present at Portsmouth Navy Days in that year.

In 1970 Naiad deployed to the Far East, and while there, participated in the Beira Patrol, designed to prevent oil reaching the landlocked Rhodesia via the then Portuguese colony of Mozambique. She performed her second patrol the following year. The Beira Patrol was a regular deployment for the RN until 1975. In 1971 she was present at Portsmouth Navy Days.

=== Ikara conversion ===
In January 1973 Naiad began her modernisation at Devonport Dockyard, with her twin 4.5-in gun being replaced by the Australian-designed Ikara anti-submarine warfare (ASW) missile system. The modernisation was completed in 1975, and Naiad then became part of the 6th Frigate Squadron.

=== Third Cod War ===
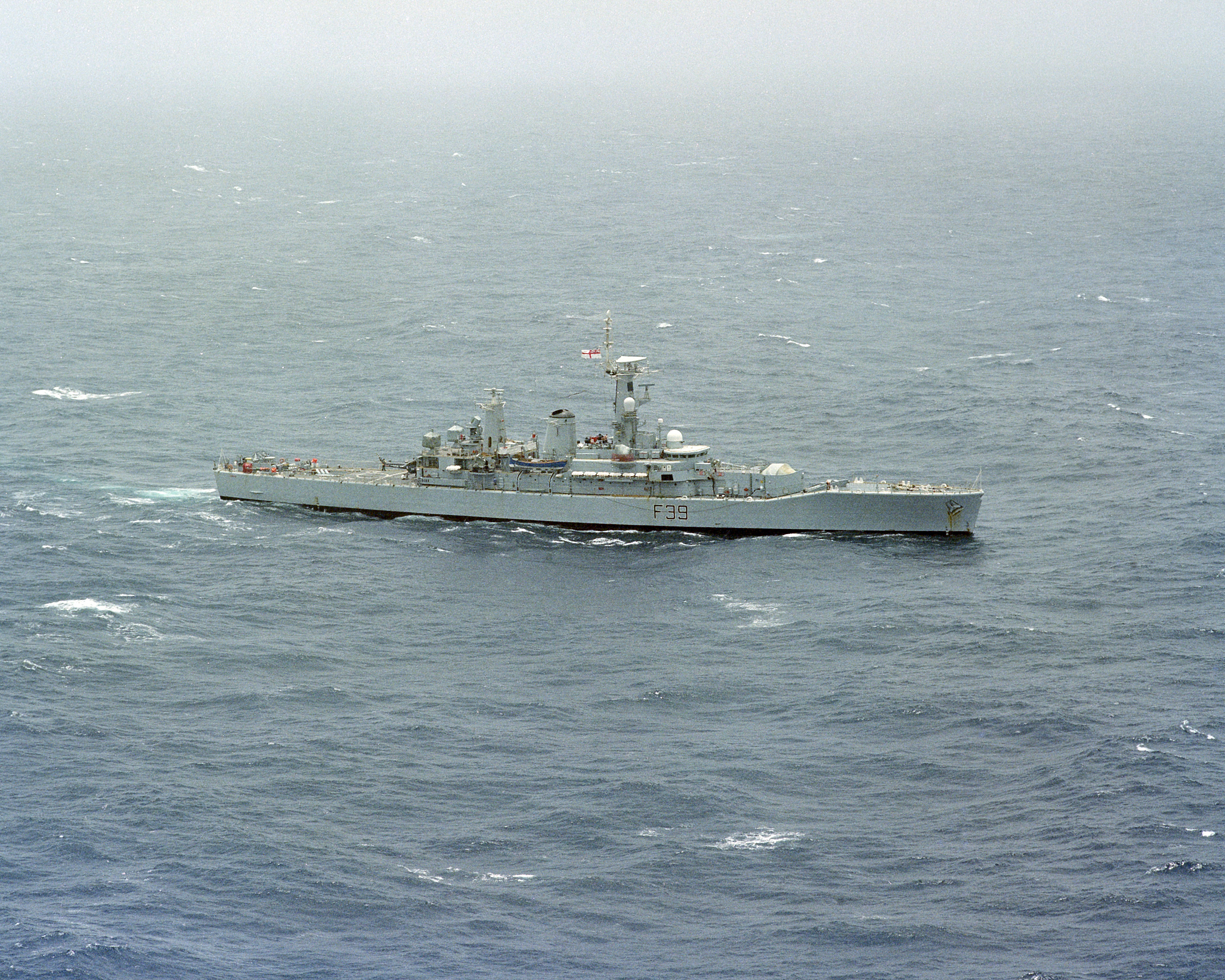
Naiad in 1982

The following year Naiad undertook a Fishery Protection Patrol during the Third Cod War, and on 24 April 1976, she was rammed by the Icelandic gunboat Tyr causing hull and bow damage. The frigate began to take tons of water, which prompted damage control teams to build a concrete enclosure around the gash. Naiad required dry docking at Devonport on her return home.

In 1977, Naiad, like many other Leanders, took part in the Fleet Review, of the Royal Navy at Spithead in celebration of the Silver Jubilee of Queen Elizabeth II. Naiad was positioned between Brighton and her sister-ship Andromeda. In 1980 Naiad deployed to the Far East once again.

In 1981 Naiad deployed to the Mediterranean. From 1983 to 1984 she underwent a refit at Devonport Dockyard. In 1985 Naiad returned to the Mediterranean as part of the NATO multi-national squadron Naval On-call Force of the Mediterranean (NAVOCFORMED), the predecessor of the Standing Naval Force Mediterranean (STANAVFORMED). The following year Naiad joined the Standing Naval Force Atlantic (STANAVFORLANT), another NATO multi-national squadron.

== Decommissioning and disposal ==
In April 1987 Naiad was decommissioned.

In 1989 she was reassigned for hull trials with the name Project Hulvul. This was an abbreviated term for 'Hull Vulnerability', during which extensive trials were undertaken utilising internal and external blast detonations of explosives to gather data on ship survival in action. Various other trails were carried out of new-fit firefighting equipment such as improved high capacity firefighting foam generators, improved firefighting clothing, fire detection and location by Thermal Imaging and the Fixed Hatch Waterwall (FHWW) device, now universally accepted and fitted across NATO fleets as an installed protection when entering a fire-stricken compartment from above. The FHWW device was conceived and invented by an Able Rating Marine Engineer in 1985.

== Fate ==
On 24 September 1990, Naiad was towed from Portsmouth and sunk as a target.

== Publications ==
- Colledge, J. J.; Warlow, Ben (2006) [1969]. Ships of the Royal Navy: The Complete Record of All Fighting Ships of the Royal Navy from the 15th Century to the Present (3rd Rev ed.). London: Chatham Publishing. ISBN 978-1-86176-281-8. OCLC 67375475.
- Marriott, Leo, 1983. Royal Navy Frigates 1945-1983, Ian Allan Ltd, Surrey. ISBN 978-0-7110-1322-3
