= HMS Leander (F109) =

1963 Type 12I or Leander-class frigate of the Royal Navy

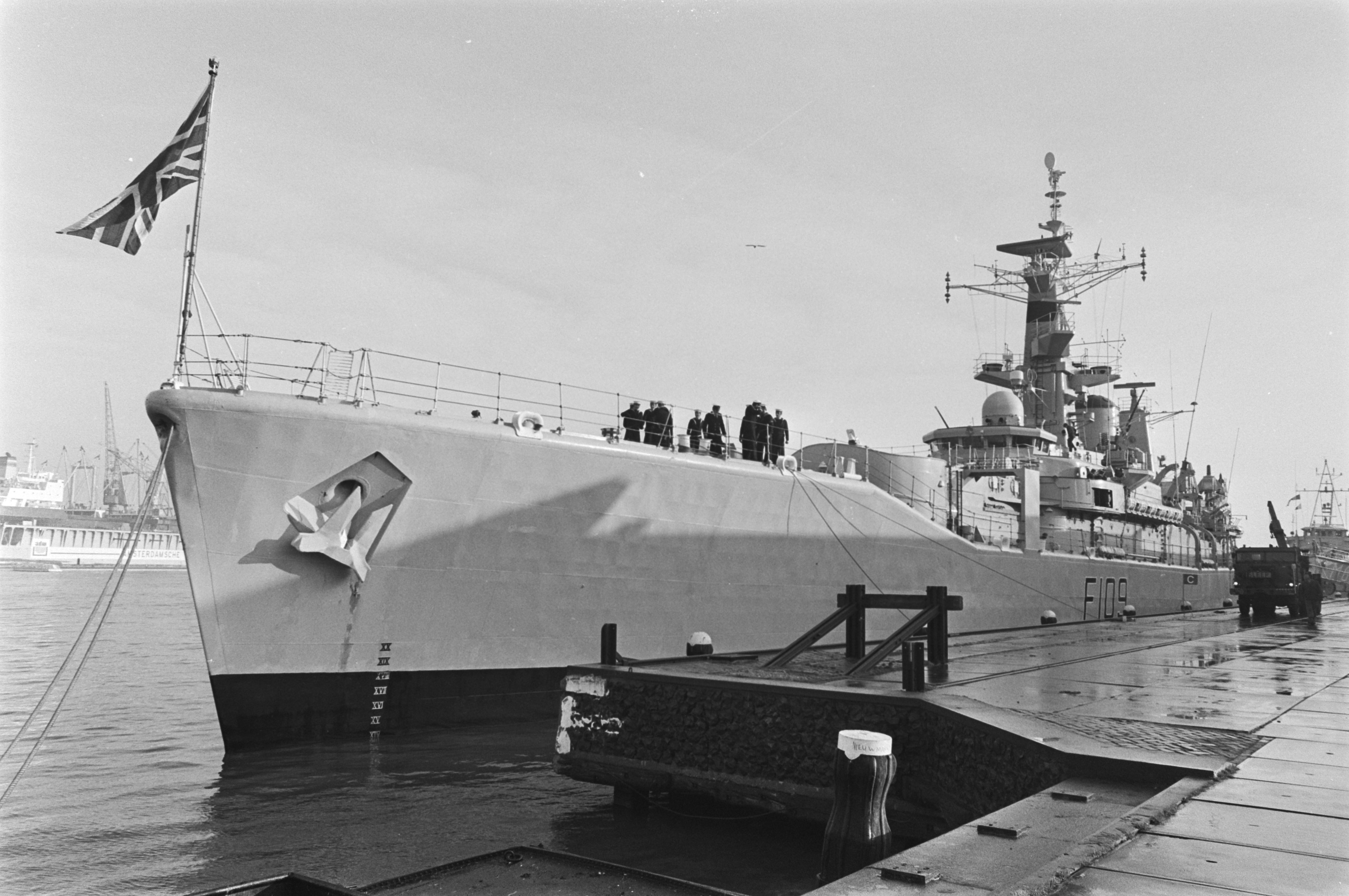
- HMS Leander (F109) in December 1977

History

United Kingdom
- Name: HMS Leander (F109)
- Operator: Royal Navy
- Builder: Harland and Wolff
- Laid down: 10 April 1959
- Launched: 28 June 1961
- Commissioned: 27 March 1963
- Decommissioned: April 1987
- Motto: Qui patitur vincit
- Fate: Sunk as target 1989

General characteristics
- Class & type: Leander-class frigate
- Displacement: 2,450 tons standard; 3,200 tons full load
- Length: 372 ft (113 m)
- Beam: 41 ft (12 m)
- Draught: 19 ft (6 m)
- Propulsion: Two Babcock & Wilcox boilers delivering steam to two sets of White/English Electric geared turbines of 30,000 shp (22,000 kW) on two shafts
- Speed: 28 knots (52 km/h)
- Range: 4,600 nautical miles (8,500 km) at 15 knots (28 km/h)
- Complement: 18 officers and 248 ratings
- Sensors & processing systems: 1 × Type 994 air/surface search radar; 1 × Type 1006 navigation radar; 1 × Type 903 fire-control radar; 1 × Type 184P active search and Type 170 attack sonar; 1x Type 199 Variable Depth Sonar (later removed)
- Electronic warfare & decoys: ADAWS5 (Action Data Automated Weapon System) combat information system, ESM system with UAA-8/9 warning and Type 668/669 jamming elements.
- Armament: 2 × 4.5-inch (110 mm) L45 DP guns in one Mk 6 twin mounting; later replaced by one Ikara ASW missile launcher in circular well forward; 2 × quadruple Seacat anti-air missile launchers; Limbo Mk10 Anti-submarine mortar; 2 × 40-millimetre (1.6 in) Bofors guns; Ship aircraft = 1 × Westland Wasp HAS Mk1 helicopter

HMS Leander (F109) was the nameship of the Leander-class frigate of the Royal Navy (RN). She was originally intended to be part of the Rothesay class and would have been known as Weymouth. Leander was, like the rest of the class, named after a figure of the classical Greek mythology. She was built by the Harland & Wolff shipyard in Belfast, Northern Ireland and was launched on 28 June 1961. She was commissioned on 27 March 1963.

== Service history ==
=== 1963–1969 ===
Upon her commissioning, Leander deployed to the West Indies, performing a variety of duties while there. She returned to the United Kingdom in April 1964. In 1965, Leander was part of Matchmaker I, a multinational squadron of NATO, and the predecessor of Standing Naval Force Atlantic (STANAVFORLANT), which was created in 1967 but was not actually formed until the following year. In 1966, Leander deployed to the Pacific, and in 1967 she returned to the West Indies and subsequently to the Persian Gulf.

=== 1970–1979 ===
In 1970, Leander joined the NATO multi-national squadron STANAVFORLANT. In June that year, Leander began modernisation that included the removal of her one twin 4.5-in gun which was replaced by the Ikara anti-submarine warfare (ASW) missile launcher. The work was completed in December 1972. In 1974, she joined the 3rd Frigate Squadron, which included other Leander-class frigates. That same year, as part of that squadron, Leander took part in Task Group (TG) 317.2, a deployment that caused some controversy back in the UK when the TG, on its way to the Far East/Pacific, visited South Africa, which was at that time under apartheid rule. As well as visiting two ports in South Africa, the TG performed military exercises with the South African armed forces, which caused uproar in some parts of the governing Labour Party, as well as gaining much press coverage.

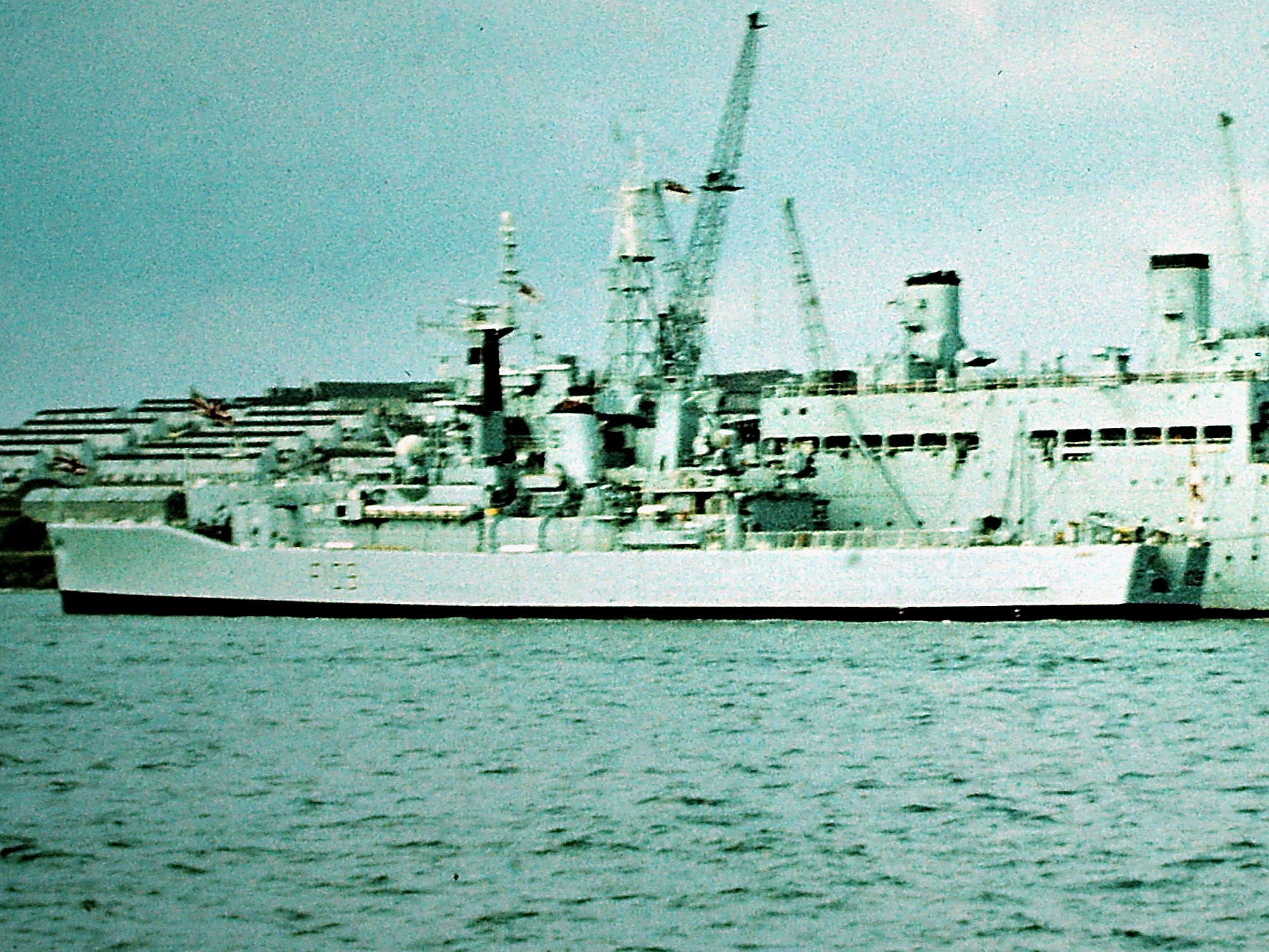
HMS Leander at Devonport in August 1977

Leander, with the rest of the TG visited Cape Town, while Diomede and the submarine Warspite visited Simonstown. The TG, upon reaching their destination performed a number of exercises and 'fly the flag' visits with Far East and Pacific countries. While in the region, Leander, like a number of the TG, was shadowed by a number of nations, including the Soviet Union, a common occurrence during the Cold War. The TG did not visit South Africa on their return, and headed to Brazil for an exercise with the Brazilian Navy. Leander returned to the United Kingdom in June 1975.

In December 1975, Leander, under the command of Captain John Tait, began a Fishery Protection Patrol during the Third Cod War between the United Kingdom and Iceland over fishing disputes. Like many other Royal Navy vessels, she was confronted by Icelandic gunboats. In January 1976, she rammed the Icelandic gunboat Þór (Thor), causing some damage to both ships. Þór sailed back to port for repairs with her helicopter deck damaged, while Leander's hull was dented on her starboard bow. No further collisions with Icelandic gunboats occurred on her first patrol, but on 17 January, the ship broke down during a heavy storm. She eventually made her way back to Faslane. The damage she suffered during her Fishery Patrol and during the storm was repaired at Devonport Dockyard. When the repairs were made, Leander undertook a second Fishery Patrol, and rammed another Icelandic patrol boat, Ver on 22 May 1976. Leander's stem was shattered, while part of Ver's port quarter was ripped off.

In 1977, Leander undertook a refit, and the following year headed to the West Indies, California, British Columbia, Mexico and Florida.

=== 1980–1989 ===
In 1982, Leander came to the aid of the Portuguese vessel MV Ave Maria which was ablaze off Exeter. Leander deployed to the Mediterranean in 1983 and again in 1985.

== Fate ==
On 31 July 1986 Leander was placed in Reserve, becoming part of the Standby Squadron. A potential sale to Chile did not occur, possibly due to Australia prohibiting the sale of the Ikara ASW missile to non-Commonwealth nations. In April 1987, Leander was decommissioned. Her career came to an end in 1989, when during a naval exercise, she was sunk by a Sea Dart missile, three Exocets and one gravity bomb.
