= HMS Arethusa (F38) =

1964 Type 12I or Leander-class frigate of the Royal Navy

- Arethusa after the Ikara missile system was fitted in her 1973 refit

History

United Kingdom
- Name: HMS Arethusa
- Operator: Royal Navy
- Builder: J. Samuel White
- Laid down: 7 September 1962
- Launched: 5 November 1963
- Commissioned: 24 November 1965
- Decommissioned: 4 April 1989
- Fate: Sunk as target, 1991

General characteristics
- Class & type: Leander-class frigate
- Displacement: 2,450 tons standard; 3,200 tons full load
- Length: 372 ft (113 m)
- Beam: 41 ft (12 m)
- Draught: 19 ft (6 m)
- Propulsion: Two Babcock & Wilcox boilers delivering steam to two sets of White/English Electric geared turbines of 30,000 shp (22,000 kW) on two shafts
- Speed: 28 knots (52 km/h)
- Range: 4,600 nautical miles (8,500 km) at 15 knots (28 km/h)
- Complement: 18 officers and 248 sailors
- Sensors & processing systems: 1 × Type 994 air/surface search radar; 1 × Type 1006 navigation radar; 2 × Type 903/904 fire-control radars; 1 × Type 184P active search and attack sonar; 1x Type 199 Variable Depth Sonar
- Electronic warfare & decoys: ADAWS (Action Data Automated weapons System) Picture compilation and combat management system, ESM system with UAA-8/9 warning and Type 668/669 jamming elements.
- Armament: 2 × 4.5-inch (110 mm) L45 DP guns in one Mk 6 twin mounting; later replaced by one Ikara ASW missile launcher in circular well forward; 2 × quadruple Sea Cat anti-air missile launchers; 2 × 40-millimetre (1.6 in) Bofors guns; 2 × Mk 32 triple 12.75-inch (324 mm) mountings for Mk46 or Stingray torpedoes
- Aircraft carried: 1 × Wasp, later Lynx helicopter

HMS Arethusa was a Leander-class frigate of the Royal Navy. She was, like most of the Leanders, named after a figure of mythology (the exceptions being Cleopatra and Sirius). Arethusa was built by J.S. White & Company Shipbuilders of Cowes, launched on 5 November 1963 and commissioned on 24 November 1965.

== Operational service ==
In 1967, Arethusa deployed to the Mediterranean. At the end of 1967 she was docked down for a repair period finishing in the spring of 1968. In the same year she took part in Portsmouth 'Navy Days'. After re dedication the ship worked up at Portland, later deploying to the Mediterranean. In 1969 Arethusa together with Juno, Hampshire and RFA Lyness visited Barbados, transited the Panama Canal and proceeded to Callao in Peru, Valparaiso, the Falkland Islands and Montevideo returning to the UK for Easter.

Later in 1969 Arethusa was deployed as West Indies guard ship. Visits included Punta Del Garda, Bermuda, Washington DC, Norfolk Virginia, Key West, Anguilla, Antigua, St Lucia, Curaçao, St Kitts, Tortola, St Vincent, Carriacou, Nassau, Freeport Grand Bahama, transiting the Panama Canal again to San Diego and San Francisco; returning via the Panama Canal to Trinidad. She continued to Cartagena, Dominica, St Martin, Bequia, Georgetown, Belize, Fort Lauderdale arriving in Portsmouth in April 1970. Arethusa was guard ship for the hand-over of independence to British Guiana.

In 1970, after visits to Lorient and Esbjerg, Arethusa deployed to the Far East via South Africa and her first Beira Patrol, While in the Far East she visited Penang, Singapore, Hong Kong, Nagoya, and the Philippines. On returning to Singapore she helped escort the Queen and the Duke of Edinburgh on their South East Asian tour. In 1972, Arethusa undertook a further Beira Patrol which was designed to prevent oil reaching the landlocked country of Rhodesia via the then-Portuguese colony of Mozambique. The following year, Arethusa undertook a fishery protection patrol during the Second Cod War, and during that patrol was rammed by the Icelandic gunboat Óðinn.

In 1973 Arethusa began her modernisation which included the removal of her one twin 4.5-in gun, with the Ikara anti-submarine warfare missile system taking its place. The modernisation was completed in April 1977. In that same year, Arethusa, like many Leanders, took part in the Royal Navy's Fleet Review in celebration of HM the Queen's Silver Jubilee. Arethusa was positioned between Cleopatra and Arrow and was part of the 3rd Frigate Squadron. Between 1978 and 1981 she was commanded by Kenneth Snow. In 1979, Arethusa deployed to the Far East and Pacific.

In 1980 Arethusa underwent a refit that was completed the following year. She then joined Standing Naval Force Atlantic, a NATO multi-national squadron. In 1985, Arethusa was fitted with towed array sonar.

== Fate ==
Arethusa was decommissioned on 4 April 1989 in Portsmouth. She was later sunk as a target in 1991.
