= List of ships of World War II (C) =

The List of ships of the Second World War contains major military vessels of the war, arranged alphabetically and by type. The list includes armed vessels that served during the war and in the immediate aftermath, inclusive of localized ongoing combat operations, garrison surrenders, post-surrender occupation, colony re-occupation, troop and prisoner repatriation, to the end of 1945. For smaller vessels, see also list of World War II ships of less than 1000 tons. Some uncompleted Axis ships are included, out of historic interest. Ships are designated to the country under which they operated for the longest period of the Second World War, regardless of where they were built or previous service history. Submarines show submerged displacement.

Click on headers to sort column alphabetically.

List of ships of World War II (C)
Ship	Country or organization	Class	Type	Displacement (tons)	First commissioned	Fate
Cabana	United States Navy	Evarts	destroyer escort	1,140	9 July 1943	scrapped 1947
Cabildo	United States Navy	Casa Grande	Dock landing ship	7,930	15 March 1945	Sunk as a target September 1985
Cabot	United States Navy	Independence	light aircraft carrier	11,000	24 July 1943	decommissioned 21 January 1955, scrapped 2002
Cachalot	Royal Navy	Grampus	submarine	1,810	15 August 1938	sunk 30 July 1941
Cadiz	Royal Navy	Battle	destroyer	2,325	12 April 1946	paid off 1953
Caesar	Royal Navy	C	destroyer	1,710	5 October 1944	paid off June 1965, scrapped 1967
Cairo	Royal Navy	C	light cruiser	4,200	24 September 1919	lost 12 August 1942
Calcaterra	United States Navy	Edsall	destroyer escort	1,250	17 November 1943	scrapped 1974
Calcutta	Royal Navy	C	light cruiser	4,200	21 August 1919	lost 1 June 1941
Calcutta	Royal Indian Navy	Basset	minesweeper	529	1941–1944	1941–1944
Caldas	Colombian National Navy	Antioquia	destroyer	1,219	16 May 1934	scrapped November 1961
Caldwell	Royal Navy; Royal Canadian Navy	Town	destroyer	1,190	24 September 1940	to RCN 1942, scrapped 1944
Caldwell	United States Navy	Benson	destroyer	1,620	10 June 1942	decommissioned 1946, scrapped 1966
Caledon	Royal Navy	C	light cruiser	4,180	6 March 1917	scrapped 1948
Calendula	Royal Navy; United States Navy	Flower	corvette	925	6 May 1940	to USA as Ready 12 March 1942, to UK 20 August 1945, paid off 1945
Calgary	Royal Canadian Navy	Flower	corvette	925	16 December 1941	paid off 19 June 1945
California	United States Navy	Tennessee	battleship	32,600	10 August 1921	Decommissioned 14 February 1947, scrapped 1959
Callaghan	United States Navy	Fletcher	destroyer	2,050	27 November 1943	sunk 28 July 1945
Calpe	Royal Navy	Hunt	destroyer escort	1,050	11 December 1941	scrapped 1966
Calypso	Royal Navy	C	light cruiser	4,180	6 March 1917	scrapped January 1948
Cambrian	Royal Navy	C	destroyer	1,710	14 July 1944	Paid off December 1968, scrapped 1971
Camellia	Royal Navy	Flower	corvette	925	18 June 1940	
Cameron	Royal Navy	Town	destroyer	1,190	24 September 1940	constructive loss 5 December 1940
Camp	United States Navy	Edsall	destroyer escort	1,250	16 September 1943	to South Vietnam 1971, to Philippines 1976
Campania	Royal Navy	Nairana	escort carrier	13,000	9 February 1944	paid off 30 December 1945, scrapped 1955
Campanula	Royal Navy	Flower	corvette	925	6 September 1940	
Campbeltown	Royal Navy	Town	destroyer	1,190	9 September 1940	expended as demolition-ship at St Nazaire, 29 March 1942
Camperdown	Royal Navy	Battle	destroyer	2,325	18 June 1945	paid off 18 June 1945, scrapped 1970
Campion	Royal Navy	Flower	corvette	925	7 July 1941	
Camrose	Royal Canadian Navy	Flower	corvette	925	30 June 1941	paid off 22 July 1945
Canberra	Royal Australian Navy	County	heavy cruiser	9,850	10 July 1928	scuttled 9 August 1942
Canberra	United States Navy	Baltimore	heavy cruiser	17,200	14 October 1943	decommissioned 1970, scrapped 1980
Candytuft	Royal Navy; United States Navy	Flower	corvette	925	16 October 1940	to USA as Tenacity 4 March 1942, to UK 26 August 1945
Canfield	United States Navy	Evarts	destroyer escort	1,140	22 July 1943	scrapped 1947
Cannon	United States Navy; Brazilian Navy	Cannon	destroyer escort	1,240	26 September 1943	to Brazil 19 December 1944 as Baependi
Cap de la Madeleine	Royal Canadian Navy	River	frigate	1,445	30 September 1944	paid off 15 May 1965
Cape Breton	Royal Canadian Navy	River	frigate	1,445	25 October 1943	paid off 26 January 1946
Cape Esperance	United States Navy	Casablanca	escort carrier	10,400	9 April 1944	scrapped 1959
Cape Gloucester	United States Navy	Commencement Bay	escort carrier	10,900	5 March 1945	decommissioned 1946, scrapped 1971
Caperton	United States Navy	Fletcher	destroyer	2,050	30 June 1943	decommissioned 1960, sunk as target
Capetown	Royal Navy	C	light cruiser	4,200	10 April 1922	Scrapped June 1946
Capilano	Royal Canadian Navy	River	frigate	1,445	25 August 1944	paid off 24 November 1945
Capitan O'Brien	Chilean Navy	Capitan O'Brien	submarine	2,020	1929	1957
Capitan Thompson	Chilean Navy	Capitan O'Brien	submarine	2,020	1929	1958
Capps	United States Navy	Fletcher	destroyer	2,050	23 June 1943	To Spain 1957, scrapped 1985
Caprice	Royal Navy	C	destroyer	1,710	5 April 1944	paid off March 1973, scrapped 1979
Captor	United States Navy		Q-ship	319	5 March 1942	paid off 4 October 1944
Caradoc	Royal Navy	C	light cruiser	4,180	15 June 1917	scrapped 1946
Card	United States Navy	Bogue	escort carrier	9,800	8 November 1942	scrapped 1971
Cardiff	Royal Navy	C	light cruiser	4,290	25 June 1917	scrapped 1946
Carinthia	Royal Navy		Armed Merchant Cruiser	20,277	August 1939	torpedoed 6 June 1940, foundered the next day
Carlisle	Royal Navy	C	light cruiser	4,200	11 November 1918	constructive total loss 9 October 1942, scrapped 1948
Carlplace	Royal Canadian Navy	River	frigate	1,445	13 December 1944	paid off 13 December 1945
Carlson	United States Navy	Evarts	destroyer escort	1,140	10 May 1943	scrapped 1946
Carmick	United States Navy	Gleaves	destroyer escort	1,630	28 December 1942	decommissioned 1954, scrapped 1972
Carnation	Royal Navy; Royal Netherlands Navy	Flower	corvette	925	22 February 1941	transferred to Netherlands 24 March 1943, paid off 4 October 1944
Carroll	United States Navy	Cannon	destroyer escort	1,240	24 October 1943	decommissioned 1946, scrapped 1966
Carron	Royal Navy	C	destroyer	1,710	6 November 1944	paid off March 1963, scrapped 1967
Carter	United States Navy	Cannon	destroyer escort	1,240	3 May 1944	to Republic of China 1948, scrapped 1973
Carter Hall	United States Navy	Ashland	Dock landing ship	7,930	18 September 1943	Stricken 1 November 1968
Carysfort	Royal Navy	C	destroyer	1,710	20 February 1945	paid off February 1969, scrapped 1970
Casablanca	United States Navy	Casablanca	escort carrier	7,800	8 July 1943	Decommissioned 10 June 1946, scrapped 1947
Casa Grande	United States Navy	Casa Grande	Dock landing ship	7,930	5 June 1944	scrapped 6 April 1992
Case	United States Navy	Mahan	destroyer	1,450	15 September 1936	scrapped 1948
Cassandra	Royal Navy	C	destroyer	1,710	28 July 1944	paid off January 1966, scrapped 1967
Cassin	United States Navy	Mahan	destroyer	1,450	21 August 1936	destroyed 7 December 1941 but "rebuilt," scrapped 1948
Cassin Young	United States Navy	Fletcher	destroyer	2,050	31 December 1943	decommissioned 1960, museum ship at Boston, MA
Castleton	Royal Navy	Town	destroyer	1,190	9 September 1940	scrapped 1947
Catamarca	Argentine Navy	Catamarca	destroyer	1,010	ca.1912	Sold 1959
Catamount	United States Navy	Casa Grande	Dock landing ship	7,930	9 April 1945	Scrapped 4 December 1975
Cates	United States Navy	Cannon	destroyer escort	1,240	15 December 1943	to France 1950, scrapped 1959
Catterick	Royal Navy	Hunt	destroyer escort	1,050	12 June 1942	to Greece 1946, scrapped 1963
Cattistock	Royal Navy	Hunt	destroyer escort	1,000	22 July 1940	paid off 26 March 1946, scrapped 1957
Cauvery	Royal Indian Navy	Black Swan	sloop	1,350	26 August 1943	1977
Cavalier	Royal Navy	C	destroyer	1,710	22 November 1944	Paid off July 1972; museum ship at Chatham
Cavalla	United States Navy	Gato	submarine	1,525 surfaced	29 February 1944	decommissioned 1968; museum at Galveston, Texas
Cavendish	Royal Navy	C	destroyer	1,710	13 December 1944	paid off 1964, scrapped 1967
Cayuga	Royal Canadian Navy	Tribal	destroyer	1,850	20 October 1947	built and launched during the war, paid off 27 February 1964
Cecil J. Doyle	United States Navy	Butler	destroyer escort	1,350	16 October 1944	decommissioned 1946, sunk as target 1967
Celandine	Royal Navy	Flower	corvette	925	30 April 1941	
Ceres	Royal Navy	C	light cruiser	4,290	1 June 1917	scrapped 1946
Cervantes	Argentine Navy	Cervantes	destroyer	1,522	3 September 1927	Struck 24 June 1961
Ceylon	Royal Navy	Fiji	light cruiser	8,800	13 July 1943	sold to Peru 1959, renamed Colonel Bolognesi
Chacabuco	Chilean Navy	Presidente Errazuriz	protected cruiser	4,500	1902	struck December 1959
Chaffee	United States Navy	Rudderow	destroyer escort	1,450	9 May 1944	decommissioned 1946, scrapped 1948
Chambers	United States Navy	Edsall	destroyer escort	1,250	24 November 1943	scrapped 1975
Chambly	Royal Canadian Navy	Flower	corvette	925	18 December 1940	paid off 20 June 1945
Champlin	United States Navy	Benson	destroyer	1,620	12 September 1942	decommissioned 1947, scrapped 1972
Chandler	United States Navy	Clemson	minesweeper destroyer	1,200	5 September 1919	scrapped 1946
Chao Ho	Republic of China Navy	Chao Ho	protected cruiser	2,750	23 October 1911	sunk 28 September 1937
Chaplet	Royal Navy	C	destroyer	1,710	24 August 1945	Laid up 1961. Sold for scrapping 1965.
Charger	United States Navy	Avenger	escort carrier	8,200	3 March 1942	paid off 15 March 1946, scrapped 1969
Charles Ausburne	United States Navy	Fletcher	destroyer	2,050	24 November 1942	scrapped 1968
Charles E. Brannon	United States Navy	Butler	destroyer escort	1,350	1 November 1944	decommissioned 1960, scrapped 1969
Charles F. Hughes	United States Navy	Benson	destroyer	1,620	5 September 1940	decommissioned 1946, sunk as target 1969
Charles J. Badger	United States Navy	Fletcher	destroyer	2,050	23 July 1943	decommissioned 1957, scrapped 1974
Charles J. Kimmel	United States Navy	Rudderow	destroyer escort	1,450	20 April 1944	decommissioned 1947, sunk as target 1969
Charles Lawrence	United States Navy	Buckley	destroyer escort	1,400	31 May 1943	scrapped 1965
Charles P. Cecil	United States Navy	Gearing	destroyer	2,250	29 June 1945	to Greece 1980, scrapped 2003
Charles R. Greer	United States Navy	Evarts	destroyer escort	1,140	25 June 1943	scrapped 1947
Charles R. Ware	United States Navy	Gearing	destroyer	2,250	21 July 1945	decommissioned 1974, sunk as target 1981
Charles S. Sperry	United States Navy	Sumner	destroyer	2,200	17 May 1944	to Chile 1974, scrapped 1990
Charlestown	Royal Navy	Town	destroyer	1,190	23 September 1940	scrapped 1947
Charlock	Royal Navy; Royal Indian Navy	Flower modified	corvette	1,015	March 1944	to RIN post-war, paid off 1947
Charlottetown (I)	Royal Canadian Navy	Flower modified	corvette	1,015	13 December 1941	sunk on 11 September 1942 by U-517
Charlottetown (II)	Royal Canadian Navy	River	frigate	1,445	28 April 1944	paid off 25 March 1947
Charrette	United States Navy	Fletcher	destroyer	2,050	18 May 1943	to Greece 1959, museum ship at Athens
Chase	United States Navy	Buckley	destroyer escort	1,400	18 July 1943	scrapped 1946
Chaser	Royal Navy	Avenger	escort carrier	11,400	9 April 1943	paid off 12 May 1946, sold into merchant service, scrapped 1972/3
Chatelain	United States Navy	Edsall	destroyer escort	1,250	22 September 1943	scrapped 1974
Chatsgrove	Royal Navy	P	Special Service ship	610	1918	broken up 1948
Chauncey	United States Navy	Fletcher	destroyer	2,050	31 May 1943	decommissioned 1954, scrapped 1972
Chebogue	Royal Canadian Navy	River	frigate	1,445	22 February 1944	paid off 25 September 1945
Chelsea	Royal Navy; Royal Canadian Navy; Soviet Navy	Town	destroyer	1,190	9 September 1940	to Canada November 1942, to USSR July 1944 as Derzkiy
Chenango	United States Navy	Sangamon	escort carrier	11,400	20 June 1941	decommissioned 1946, scrapped 1960
Chequers	Royal Navy	C	destroyer	1,710	28 September 1945	scrapped 1966.
Chervona Ukraina	Soviet Navy	Svetlana	light cruiser	7,600	3 October 1913	Sunk 12 November 1941
Chester	United States Navy	Northampton	heavy cruiser	9,200	24 June 1930	scrapped 1959
Chester T. O’Brien	United States Navy	Butler	destroyer escort	1,350	3 July 1944	decommissioned 1959, scrapped 1974
Chesterfield	Royal Navy	Town	destroyer	1,190	9 September 1940	scrapped 1947
Chevalier (I)	United States Navy	Fletcher	destroyer	2,050	20 June 1942	sunk 7 October 1943
Chevalier (II)	United States Navy	Gearing	destroyer	2,250	9 January 1945	to South Korea 1977
Chevron	Royal Navy	C	destroyer	1,710	23 August 1945	scrapped 1969
Chew	United States Navy	Wickes	destroyer	1,190	12 December 1918	scrapped 1946
Chicago (I)	United States Navy	Northampton	heavy cruiser	9,200	9 March 1931	sunk 30 January 1943
Chicago (II)	United States Navy	Baltimore	heavy cruiser	17,200	10 January 1945	converted to missile cruiser 1964, decommissioned 1980, scrapped 1992
Chicoutimi	Royal Canadian Navy	Flower	corvette	925	12 May 1941	paid off 16 June 1945
Chiddingfold	Royal Navy	Hunt	destroyer escort	1,050	October 1941	paid off April 1952, scrapped 1975
Chieftain	Royal Navy	C	destroyer	1,710	7 March 1946	Scrapped 1961
Chikuma	Imperial Japanese Navy	Tone	heavy cruiser	15,200	30 May 1939	sunk 25 October 1944
Chilliwack	Royal Canadian Navy	Flower	corvette	925	8 April 1941	paid off 14 July 1945
Chitose	Imperial Japanese Navy	Chitose	light aircraft carrier	11,190	25 July 1938	sunk 25 October 1944
Chiyoda	Imperial Japanese Navy	Chitose	light aircraft carrier	11,190	15 December 1938	sunk 25 October 1944
Christopher	United States Navy; Brazilian Navy	Cannon	destroyer escort	1,240	23 October 1943	to Brazil 19 December 1944 as Benevente
Chrysanthemum	Royal Navy	Flower	corvette	925	1941	sold 1947
Churchill	Royal Navy; Soviet Navy	Town	destroyer	1,190	9 September 1940	to USSR as Deyatelny 16 July 1944, sunk 16 January 1945
Chōkai	Imperial Japanese Navy	Takao	heavy cruiser	15,781	1932	sunk 25 October 1944
Chūyō	Imperial Japanese Navy	Taiyō	escort carrier	18,116	25 November 1942	sunk 4 December 1943
Cincinnati	United States Navy	Omaha	light cruiser	7,050	1 January 1924	scrapped 1946
Clare	Royal Navy	Town	destroyer	1,190	9 September 1940	scrapped 1945
Clarence K. Bronson	United States Navy	Fletcher	destroyer	2,050	11 June 1943	to Turkey 1967, scrapped 1987
Clarence L. Evans	United States Navy	Cannon	destroyer escort	1,240	25 June 1944	to France 1952, scrapped 1960
Clark	United States Navy	Porter	destroyer	1,850	20 May 1936	scrapped 1946
Clarkia	Royal Navy	Flower	corvette	925	22 April 1940	scrapped 1947
Claxton	United States Navy	Fletcher	destroyer	2,050	8 December 1942	To West Germany 1959
Clematis	Royal Navy	Flower	corvette	925	27 July 1940	scrapped 1949
Clemson	United States Navy	Clemson	destroyer	1,250	29 December 1919	Decommissioned 12 October 1945
Cleveland	Royal Navy	Hunt	destroyer escort	1,000	1940	paid off 26 March 1946, scrapped 1959
Cleveland	United States Navy	Cleveland	light cruiser	10,000	15 June 1942	decommissioned 7 February 1947, scrapped 1960
Clive	Royal Indian Navy		sloop	2,083	20 April 1920	1947
Cloues	United States Navy	Evarts	destroyer escort	1,140	10 August 1943	scrapped 1947
Clover	Royal Navy	Flower	corvette	925	13 May 1941	
Clyde	Royal Navy	River	submarine	2,206	1935	paid off 30 July 1946
Coates	United States Navy	Rudderow	destroyer escort	1,450	24 January 1944	decommissioned 1970, sunk as target 1971
Coaticook	Royal Canadian Navy	River	frigate	1,445	25 July 1944	paid off 29 November 1945
Cobalt	Royal Canadian Navy	Flower	corvette	925	25 November 1940	paid off 17 June 1945
Cobourg	Royal Canadian Navy	Flower modified	corvette	1,015	11 May 1944	15 June 1945
Cochin	Royal Indian Navy	Basset	minesweeper	529	1941–1944	1941–1944
Cockade	Royal Navy	C	destroyer	1,885	29 September 1945	Paid off 1958, scrapped 1964
Cockrill	United States Navy	Edsall	destroyer escort	1,250	24 December 1943	decommissioned 1946, sunk as target 1974
Codrington	Royal Navy	A	destroyer leader	1,350	4 June 1930	sunk 27 July 1940
Cofer	United States Navy	Buckley	destroyer escort	1,400	18 January 1944	decommissioned 1946, scrapped 1968
Coffman	United States Navy	Cannon	destroyer escort	1,240	27 December 1943	decommissioned 1946, scrapped 1973
Coghlan	United States Navy	Benson	destroyer	1,620	10 July 1942	decommissioned 1947, scrapped 1974
Cogswell	United States Navy	Fletcher	destroyer	2,050	17 August 1943	to Turkey 1969, scrapped 1980
Colahan	United States Navy	Fletcher	destroyer	2,050	23 August 1943	sunk as target 1966
Colbert	French Navy	Suffren	heavy cruiser	10,000	4 March 1931	scuttled 27 November 1942
Cole	United States Navy	Wickes	destroyer	1,190	19 June 1919	scrapped 1947
Colhoun (I)	United States Navy	Wickes	destroyer	1,060	13 June 1918	sunk 30 August 1942
Colhoun (II)	United States Navy	Fletcher	destroyer	2,050	8 July 1944	Sunk 6 April 1945
Collett	United States Navy	Sumner	destroyer	2,200	16 May 1944	to Argentina 1974
Collingwood	Royal Canadian Navy	Flower	corvette	925	19 November 1940	paid off 23 July 1945
Colombo	Royal Navy	C	light cruiser	4,200	18 June 1919	scrapped 1948
Colonial	United States Navy	Casa Grande	Dock landing ship	7,930	15 May 1945	Scrapped 8 September 1993
Colossus	Royal Navy	Colossus	aircraft carrier	13,200	16 December 1944	transferred to France, renamed Arromanches 6 August 1946
Coltsfoot	Royal Navy	Flower	corvette	925	1 November 1941	
Columbia	Royal Canadian Navy	Town	destroyer	1,060	24 September 1940	paid off August 1945
Columbia	United States Navy	Cleveland	light cruiser	11,800	29 July 1942	scrapped 1959
Columbine	Royal Navy	Flower	corvette	925	9 November 1940	
Columbus	United States Navy	Baltimore	heavy cruiser	17,200	8 June 1945	converted to missile cruiser 1962, scrapped 1977
Combattante	Free French Naval Forces	Hunt	destroyer escort	1,050	30 December 1942	sunk 23 February 1945
Comet	Royal Navy	C	destroyer	1,885	6 June 1945	Paid off 1958, scrapped 1962
Commandant d'Estienne d'Orves	Free French Naval Forces	Flower	corvette	925	23 May 1942	31 May 1947
Commandant Detroyat	Free French Naval Forces	Flower	corvette	925	16 September 1941	1947
Commandant Drogou	Free French Naval Forces	Flower	corvette	925	15 January 1942	May 1947
Commencement Bay	United States Navy	Commencement Bay	escort carrier	11,373	27 November 1944	Decommissioned 30 November 1946, scrapped 1971
Compton	United States Navy	Sumner	destroyer	2,200	4 November 1944	to Brazil 1972, scrapped 1990
Comstock	United States Navy	Casa Grande	Dock landing ship	7,930	2 July 1945	Transferred to Taiwan 17 October 1984
Concord	United States Navy	Omaha	light cruiser	7,050	3 November 1923	scrapped 1947
Cone	United States Navy	Gearing	destroyer	2,250	18 August 1945	to Pakistan 1982, scrapped 1998
Conklin	United States Navy	Butler	destroyer escort	1,350	21 April 1944	decommissioned 1946, scrapped 1972
Conner (II)	United States Navy	Fletcher	destroyer	2,050	8 June 1943	to Greece 1959, scrapped 1997
Connolly	United States Navy	Evarts	destroyer escort	1,140	8 July 1944	scrapped 1947
Conrad	Royal Navy; Polish Navy	D	light cruiser	4,850	4 October 1944	returned to Royal Navy 28 September 1946, scrapped March 1948
Conte di Cavour	Regia Marina	Conte di Cavour	dreadnought	26,140	1915	captured 10 September 1943 by Germany, scrapped 1946
Contest	Royal Navy	C	destroyer	1,885	9 November 1945	scrapped 1960
Converse	United States Navy	Fletcher	destroyer	2,050	20 November 1942	to Spain 1959, scrapped 1988
Convolvulus	Royal Navy	Flower	corvette	925	26 February 1941	
Conway	United States Navy	Fletcher	destroyer	2,050	9 October 1942	sunk as target 1970
Cony	United States Navy	Fletcher	destroyer	2,050	30 October 1942	sunk as target 1970
Conyngham	United States Navy	Mahan	destroyer	1,450	4 November 1936	scuttled 1948 after A-bomb test
Coolbaugh	United States Navy	Buckley	destroyer escort	1,400	15 October 1943	decommissioned 1960, scrapped 1973
Cooner	United States Navy	Cannon	destroyer escort	1,240	21 August 1943	decommissioned 1946, scrapped 1973
Cooper	United States Navy	Sumner	destroyer	2,200	9 February 1944	sunk 3 December 1944
Copahee	United States Navy	Bogue	escort carrier	9,800	15 June 1942	decommissioned 1946, scrapped 1961
Coral Sea	United States Navy	Casablanca	escort carrier	9,600	27 August 1943	renamed Anzio, decommissioned 1946, scrapped 1959
Core	United States Navy	Bogue	escort carrier	9,800	10 December 1942	decommissioned 1946, scrapped 1971
Coreopsis	Royal Navy; Hellenic Navy	Flower	corvette	925	August 1940	to Greece as Kriezis 10 November 1943, out of service 1952
Coriander	Royal Navy	Flower	corvette	925	16 September 1941	scrapped 1948
Cornwallis	Royal Indian Navy	Cornwallis	Sloop	1,290	1921	Scrapped 1946
Coronel	Kriegsmarine		auxiliary cruiser	12,700	13 August 1938	ran aground 21 November 1984
Corregidor	United States Navy	Casablanca	escort carrier	10,400	31 August 1943	scrapped 1959
Corrientes	Argentine Navy	Buenos Aires	destroyer	1,375		Lost 3 October 1941
Corry	United States Navy	Gleaves	destroyer	1,630	18 December 1941	sunk 6 June 1944
Cossack (I)	Royal Navy	Tribal	destroyer	2,020	7 June 1938	sunk 24 October 1941
Cossack (II)	Royal Navy	C	destroyer	1,885	4 September 1945	scrapped 1961
Cotswold	Royal Navy	Hunt	destroyer escort	1,050	16 November 1940	paid off 1946, scrapped 1957
Cotten	United States Navy	Fletcher	destroyer	2,050	24 July 1943	decommissioned 1960, scrapped 1975
Cottesmore	Royal Navy	Hunt	destroyer escort	1,050	29 December 1940	paid off 28 February 1946, scrapped 1951
Courageous	Royal Navy	Glorious	aircraft carrier	22,500	4 November 1916	sunk 17 September 1939
Courbet	French Navy; Free French Naval Forces	Courbet	dreadnought	23,200	November 1913	scuttled as a "Gooseberry" breakwater 6 June 1944
Coventry	Royal Navy	C	light cruiser	4,290	21 February 1918	lost 14 September 1942
Cowell	United States Navy	Fletcher	destroyer	2,050	23 August 1943	to Argentina 1971, scrapped 1982
Cowie	United States Navy	Gleaves	destroyer	1,630	1 June 1942	decommissioned 1947, scrapped 1972
Cowpens	United States Navy	Independence	light aircraft carrier	11,000	28 May 1943	decommissioned 13 January 1947, scrapped 1960
Cowslip	Royal Navy	Flower	corvette	925	9 August 1941	
Crane	United States Navy	Wickes	destroyer	1,190	18 April 1919	scrapped 1946
Craven	United States Navy	Gridley	destroyer	1,590	2 September 1937	scrapped 1947
Crescent	Royal Canadian Navy	C	destroyer	1,900	21 August 1945	delivered to Canada January 1945, scrapped 1971
Croatan	United States Navy	Bogue	escort carrier	9,800	28 April 1943	decommissioned 1946, scrapped 1971
Crocus	Royal Navy	Flower	corvette	925	20 October 1940	
Cronin	United States Navy	Buckley	destroyer escort	1,400	5 May 1944	sunk as target 1971
Croome	Royal Navy	Hunt	destroyer escort	1,000	29 June 1941	paid off October 1945, scrapped 1957
Crosby	United States Navy	Wickes	destroyer	1,190	24 January 1919	scrapped 1946
Cross	United States Navy	Butler	destroyer escort	1,350	8 January 1945	decommissioned 1958, scrapped 1968
Crouter	United States Navy	Evarts	destroyer escort	1,140	25 May 1943	scrapped 1947
Crowley	United States Navy	Evarts	destroyer escort	1,140	25 March 1944	scrapped 1947
Crusader	Royal Canadian Navy	C	destroyer	1,900	26 November 1945	delivered to Canada January 1945, scrapped 1971
Cuba	Cuba		Sloop	2,055	c.1911	stricken 1971
Cummings	United States Navy	Mahan	destroyer	1,450	25 November 1936	scrapped 1947
Curacoa	Royal Navy	C-class	light cruiser	4,290	18 February 1918	lost 2 October 1942
Curie	Royal Navy Free French Naval Forces	U	submarine	540	2 May 1943	returned to Royal Navy July 1946, paid off May 1949
Curlew	Royal Navy	C	light cruiser	4,290	14 December 1917	lost 26 May 1940
Currier	United States Navy	Buckley	destroyer escort	1,400	1 February 1944	sunk as target 1967
Cushing (I)	United States Navy	Mahan	destroyer	1,450	28 August 1936	sunk 13 November 1942
Cushing (II)	United States Navy	Fletcher	destroyer	2,050	17 January 1944	to Brazil 1961, scrapped 1982
Cuttack	Royal Indian Navy	Basset	minesweeper	529	1941–1944	1941–1944
Cyclamen	Royal Navy	Flower	corvette	925	30 September 1940	
Cyprus	Royal Navy		Special Service Ship	4,398		paid off March 1941
