= HMS Childers (R91) =

C-class destroyer

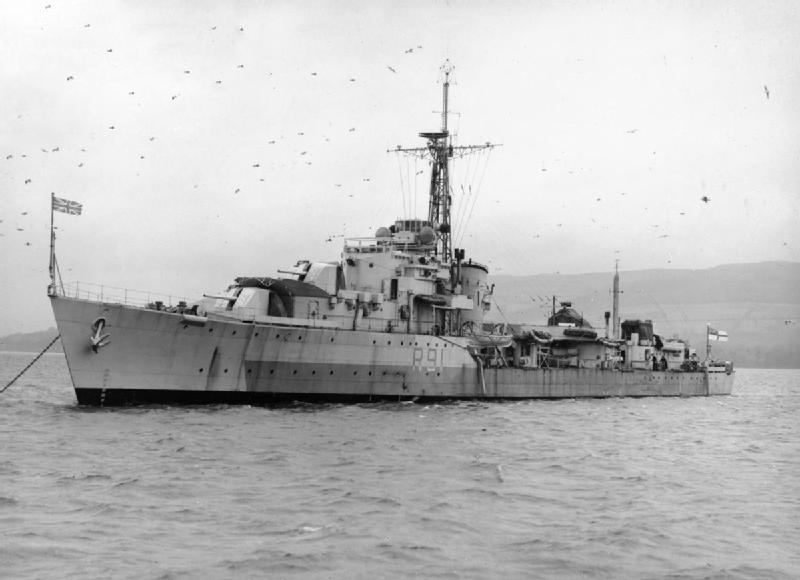
- Childers at anchor on the River Clyde, December 1946

History

United Kingdom
- Name: Childers
- Ordered: 24 July 1942
- Builder: Denny, Dumbarton
- Laid down: 27 November 1943
- Launched: 27 February 1945
- Commissioned: 19 December 1945
- Decommissioned: 1951
- Identification: Pennant number: R91 later changed to D91
- Fate: Arrived in Spezia for scrapping 22 September 1963

General characteristics (as built)
- Class & type: C-class destroyer
- Displacement: 1,906 long tons (1,937 t) (standard)
- Length: 362 ft 9 in (110.6 m) o/a
- Beam: 35 ft 8 in (10.9 m)
- Draught: 15 ft 3 in (4.6 m) (full load)
- Installed power: 2 Admiralty 3-drum boilers; 40,000 shp (30,000 kW)
- Propulsion: 2 shafts; 2 geared steam turbines
- Speed: 36 knots (67 km/h; 41 mph)
- Range: 4,675 nautical miles (8,658 km; 5,380 mi) at 20 knots (37 km/h; 23 mph)
- Complement: 222
- Armament: 4 × single 4.5 in (114 mm) DP guns; 1 × twin 40 mm (1.6 in) AA gun; 2 × single 2-pdr (40 mm) AA guns; 2 × single 20 mm (0.8 in) AA guns; 2 × quadruple 21 in (533 mm) torpedo tubes; 2 throwers and 2 racks for 35 depth charges

HMS Childers was one of thirty-two C-class destroyers built for the Royal Navy during the Second World War, a member of the eight-ship Ch sub-class. Commissioned in 1945, she was built as a flotilla leader with additional accommodation for staff officers.

== Design and description ==
The Ch sub-class was a repeat of the preceding Ca sub-class, except that the addition of remote control for the main-gun mounts caused some of the ships' intended weapons to be removed to save weight. Childers displaced 1,906 long tons (1,937 t) at standard load and 2,566 long tons (2,607 t) at deep load. They had an overall length of 362 feet 9 inches (110.6 m), a beam of 35 feet 8 inches (10.9 m) and a deep draught of 15 feet 3 inches (4.6 m).

The ships were powered by a pair of geared steam turbines, each driving one propeller shaft using steam provided by two Admiralty three-drum boilers. The turbines developed a total of 40,000 indicated horsepower (30,000 kW) and gave a speed of 36 knots (67 km/h; 41 mph) at normal load. During her sea trials, Childers reached a speed of 31.6 knots (58.5 km/h; 36.4 mph) at a load of 2,310 long tons (2,350 t). The Ch sub-class carried enough fuel oil to give them a range of 4,675 nautical miles (8,658 km; 5,380 mi) at 15 knots (28 km/h; 17 mph). As a flotilla leader, Childers' complement was 222 officers and ratings.

The main armament of the destroyers consisted of four QF 4.5-inch (114 mm) Mk IV dual-purpose guns, one superfiring pair each fore and aft of the superstructure protected by partial gun shields. Their anti-aircraft suite consisted of one twin-gun stabilised Mk IV "Hazemeyer" mount for 40-millimetre (1.6 in) Bofors guns and two single 2-pounder (40 mm) AA guns amidships, and single mounts for a 20-millimetre (0.8 in) Oerlikon AA gun on the bridge wings. To compensate for the weight of the remote control equipment, one of the two quadruple 21-inch (533 mm) torpedo tube mounts was removed and the depth charge stowage was reduced to only 35. The ships were fitted with a pair of rails and two throwers for the depth charges.

== Construction and career ==
Childers was originally intended to be ordered from Vickers-Armstrongs' shipyard in Barrow-in-Furness, but that facility was overloaded with work and the contract was switched to William Denny & Brothers. The ship was laid down on 27 November 1943 at its Dumbarton shipyard, launched on 27 February 1945 and was commissioned on 19 December.

In 1946 Childers was assigned to the 1st Destroyer Squadron based at Malta. She saw service, along with other Royal Navy ships in preventing illegal immigration into Palestine in 1947. Her pennant number was also later changed to D90 from R91. She returned to the UK in 1950 and was placed in reserve in 1951. She was given an interim modernization in 1954, which saw her 'X' turret at the rear of the ship replaced by two Squid anti-submarine mortars.

In 1958 she was laid up in reserve at Gibraltar. Childers was never recommissioned and was subsequently sold for scrapping at La Spezia, arriving there on 22 September 1963.

== Bibliography ==
- Chesneau, Roger, ed. (1980). Conway's All the World's Fighting Ships 1922–1946. Greenwich, UK: Conway Maritime Press. ISBN 0-85177-146-7.
- Colledge, J. J.; Warlow, Ben (2006) [1969]. Ships of the Royal Navy: The Complete Record of All Fighting Ships of the Royal Navy from the 15th Century to the Present (3rd Rev ed.). London: Chatham Publishing. ISBN 978-1-86176-281-8. OCLC 67375475.
- English, John (2001). Obdurate to Daring: British Fleet Destroyers 1941–45. Windsor, UK: World Ship Society. ISBN 978-0-9560769-0-8.
- Friedman, Norman (2006). British Destroyers and Frigates, the Second World War and After. Annapolis, Maryland: Naval Institute Press. ISBN 1-86176-137-6.
- Lenton, H. T. (1998). British & Empire Warships of the Second World War. Annapolis, Maryland: Naval Institute Press. ISBN 1-55750-048-7.
- March, Edgar J. (1966). British Destroyers: A History of Development, 1892–1953; Drawn by Admiralty Permission From Official Records & Returns, Ships' Covers & Building Plans. London: Seeley Service. OCLC 164893555.
- Rohwer, Jürgen (2005). Chronology of the War at Sea 1939–1945: The Naval History of World War Two (Third Revised ed.). Annapolis, Maryland: Naval Institute Press. ISBN 1-59114-119-2.
- Whitley, M. J. (1988). Destroyers of World War Two: An International Encyclopedia. Annapolis, Maryland: Naval Institute Press. ISBN 0-87021-326-1.
