= HMS Chivalrous =

C-class destroyer

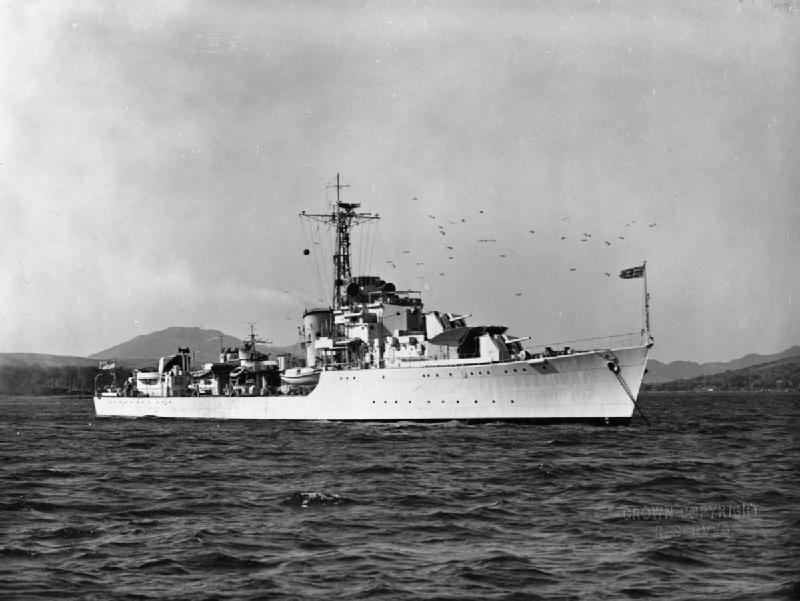
- Chivalrous on completion on the River Clyde, 1946

History

United Kingdom
- Name: Chivalrous
- Builder: Denny, Dumbarton
- Laid down: 27 November 1943
- Launched: 22 June 1945
- Commissioned: 13 May 1946
- Out of service: 29 June 1954
- Identification: Pennant number: R21, changed to D21
- Honours and awards: Korean War
- Fate: Loaned to the Pakistan Navy, 29 June 1954

History

Pakistan
- Name: PNS Taimur
- Acquired: 29 June 1954
- Commissioned: 1954
- Out of service: 3 June 1958
- Home port: Karachi
- Fate: Returned to the Royal Navy, 8 April 1959, and scrapped 1961

General characteristics (as built)
- Class & type: C-class destroyer
- Displacement: 1,906 long tons (1,937 t) (standard)
- Length: 362 ft 9 in (110.6 m) o/a
- Beam: 35 ft 8 in (10.9 m)
- Draught: 15 ft 3 in (4.6 m) (full load)
- Installed power: 2 Admiralty 3-drum boilers; 40,000 shp (30,000 kW)
- Propulsion: 2 shafts; 2 geared steam turbines
- Speed: 36 knots (67 km/h; 41 mph)
- Range: 4,675 nautical miles (8,658 km; 5,380 mi) at 20 knots (37 km/h; 23 mph)
- Complement: 222
- Armament: 4 × single 4.5 in (114 mm) DP guns; 1 × twin 40 mm (1.6 in) AA gun; 2 × single 2-pdr (40 mm) AA guns; 2 × single 20 mm (0.8 in) AA guns; 2 × quadruple 21 in (533 mm) torpedo tubes; 2 throwers and 2 racks for 35 depth charges

HMS Chivalrous was one of thirty-two C-class destroyers built for the Royal Navy during the Second World War, a member of the eight-ship Ch sub-class. Commissioned in 1946, she was built as a flotilla leader with additional accommodation for staff officers. The ship was loaned to the Pakistani Navy during the late 1950s and was sold for scrap in 1961 after being returned.

== Design and description ==
The Ch sub-class was a repeat of the preceding Ca sub-class, except that the addition of remote control for the main-gun mounts caused some of the ships' intended weapons to be removed to save weight. Chivalrous displaced 1,906 long tons (1,937 t) at standard load and 2,566 long tons (2,607 t) at deep load. They had an overall length of 362 feet 9 inches (110.6 m), a beam of 35 feet 8 inches (10.9 m) and a deep draught of 15 feet 3 inches (4.6 m).

The ships were powered by a pair of geared steam turbines, each driving one propeller shaft using steam provided by two Admiralty three-drum boilers. The turbines developed a total of 40,000 indicated horsepower (30,000 kW) and gave a speed of 36 knots (67 km/h; 41 mph) at normal load. During her sea trials, Chivalrous reached a speed of 31.6 knots (58.5 km/h; 36.4 mph) at a load of 2,375 long tons (2,413 t). The Ch sub-class carried enough fuel oil to give them a range of 4,675 nautical miles (8,658 km; 5,380 mi) at 15 knots (28 km/h; 17 mph). As a flotilla leader, Chivalrous's complement was 222 officers and ratings.

The main armament of the destroyers consisted of four QF 4.5-inch (114 mm) Mk IV dual-purpose guns, one superfiring pair each fore and aft of the superstructure protected by partial gun shields. Their anti-aircraft suite consisted of one twin-gun stabilised Mk IV "Hazemeyer" mount for 40-millimetre (1.6 in) Bofors guns and two single 2-pounder (40 mm) AA guns amidships, and single mounts for a 20-millimetre (0.8 in) Oerlikon AA gun on the bridge wings. To compensate for the weight of the remote control equipment, one of the two quadruple 21-inch (533 mm) torpedo tube mounts was removed and the depth charge stowage was reduced to only 35. The ships were fitted with a pair of rails and two throwers for the depth charges.

== Construction and career ==
Chivalrous was originally intended to be ordered from Vickers-Armstrongs' shipyard in Barrow-in-Furness, but that facility was overloaded with work and the contract was switched to William Denny & Brothers. The ship was laid down on 27 November 1943 at its Dumbarton shipyard, launched on 22 June 1945 and was commissioned on 13 May 1946.

She formed part of the 14th (later 1st) Destroyer Squadron for service in the Mediterranean. She saw service, along with other Royal Navy ships in preventing illegal immigration into Palestine in 1947.

== History in the Pakistan Navy ==
Chivalrous was loaned to the Pakistan Navy on 29 June 1954 and renamed Taimur. She was returned to the Royal Navy and scrapped in 1961.

== Bibliography ==
- Chesneau, Roger, ed. (1980). Conway's All the World's Fighting Ships 1922–1946. Greenwich, UK: Conway Maritime Press. ISBN 0-85177-146-7.
- Colledge, J. J.; Warlow, Ben (2006) [1969]. Ships of the Royal Navy: The Complete Record of All Fighting Ships of the Royal Navy from the 15th Century to the Present (3rd Rev ed.). London: Chatham Publishing. ISBN 978-1-86176-281-8. OCLC 67375475.
- English, John (2001). Obdurate to Daring: British Fleet Destroyers 1941–45. Windsor, UK: World Ship Society. ISBN 978-0-9560769-0-8.
- Friedman, Norman (2006). British Destroyers and Frigates, the Second World War and After. Annapolis, Maryland: Naval Institute Press. ISBN 1-86176-137-6.
- Lenton, H. T. (1998). British & Empire Warships of the Second World War. Annapolis, Maryland: Naval Institute Press. ISBN 1-55750-048-7.
- March, Edgar J. (1966). British Destroyers: A History of Development, 1892–1953; Drawn by Admiralty Permission From Official Records & Returns, Ships' Covers & Building Plans. London: Seeley Service. OCLC 164893555.
- Marriott, Leo (1989). Royal Navy Destroyers Since 1945. Ian Allan. ISBN 0-7110-1817-0.
- Whitley, M. J. (1988). Destroyers of World War Two: An International Encyclopedia. Annapolis, Maryland: Naval Institute Press. ISBN 0-87021-326-1.
