= R52 =

R52 may refer to:

== Roads ==
- R52 (South Africa), a road
- D52 motorway in the Czech Republic, formerly R52 expressway

== Other uses ==
- HMS Chaplet (R52), a destroyer of the Royal Navy
- Mini Cabrio (R52), a convertible
- Nissan Pathfinder (R52), a SUV
- R52: Harmful to aquatic organisms, a risk phrase
