= HNoMS Trondheim =

At least two ships of the Royal Norwegian Navy have been named HNoMS Trondheim, after the city of Trondheim:

- HNoMS Trondheim (1946), a C-class destroyer purchased from the Royal Navy in 1946 and broken up in 1961.
- HNoMS Trondheim (F302), an Oslo-class frigate commissioned in 1966 and decommissioned in 2006.
