= Trondheim (disambiguation) =

Trondheim is a city and municipality in Norway.

Trondheim may also refer to:

- HNoMS Trondheim, several ships of the Royal Norwegian Navy

== People with the surname ==
- Lewis Trondheim (born 1964), French cartoonist
- Sigmund Trondheim, Danish singer; 2018 Danish X Factor participant
