= HNoMS Bergen (1946) =

C-class destroyer

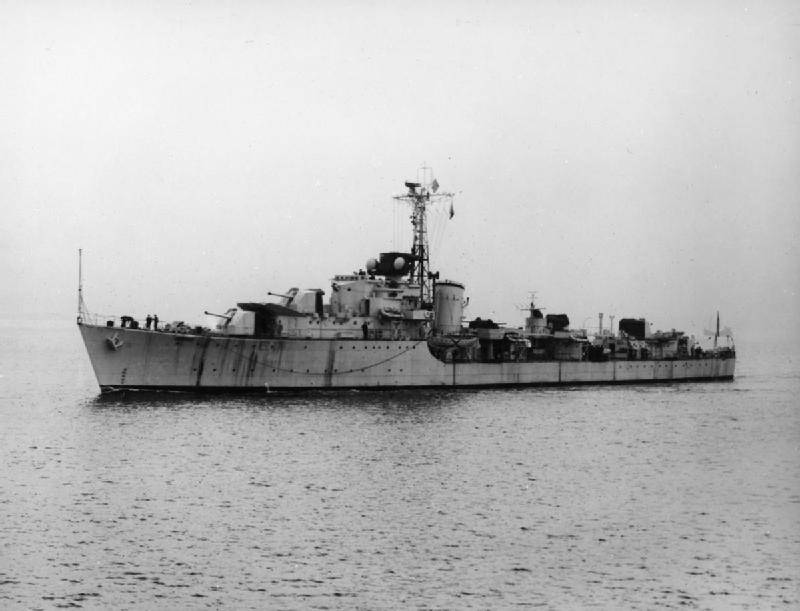
- HMS Cromwell, 1946

History

United Kingdom
- Name: Cromwell (initially Cretan)
- Builder: Scotts, Greenock
- Laid down: 24 November 1943
- Launched: 6 August 1945
- Commissioned: 16 September 1946
- Out of service: 1946
- Identification: Pennant number: R35
- Fate: Sold to the Royal Norwegian Navy

History

Norway
- Name: Bergen
- Commissioned: 1946
- Identification: Pennant number: D304
- Fate: Scrapped 1967

General characteristics
- Class & type: C-class destroyer
- Displacement: 1,710 tons (standard) 2,520 tons (full)
- Length: 363 ft (111 m) o/a
- Beam: 35.75 ft (10.90 m)
- Draught: 10 ft (3.0 m) light; 14.5 ft (4.4 m) full
- Propulsion: 2 Admiralty 3-drum boilers, Parsons geared steam turbines, 40,000 shp (30,000 kW), 2 shafts
- Speed: 37 knots (69 km/h)
- Range: 615 tons oil, 1,400 nautical miles (2,600 km) at 32 knots (59 km/h)
- Complement: 186
- Armament: 4 × QF 4.5 in (114 mm) L/45 guns Mark IV on mounts CP Mk.V; 2 × Bofors 40 mm L/60 guns on twin mount "Hazemeyer" Mk.IV; 4 × anti-aircraft mountings; Bofors 40 mm, single mount Mk.III; QF 2-pdr Mk VIII, single mount Mk.XVI; Oerlikon 20 mm, single mount P Mk.III; Oerlikon 20 mm, twin mount Mk.V; 1 × quadruple tubes for 21 inch (533 mm) torpedoes Mk.IX; 4 × depth charge throwers

HNoMS Bergen was a C-class destroyer built for the Royal Navy as HMS Cromwell. She was built by Scotts of Greenock between 1944 and 1946 and initially was to have been called Cretan. She was sold to the Royal Norwegian Navy in 1946 and renamed Bergen. She was scrapped in 1967.

== Operational service ==
Commissioned too late for service in the Second World War, following sale her pennant number was changed to D304. She was one of four Cr-class destroyers sold to Norway. Unlike many other destroyers of this class, none of the Norwegian ships received any significant upgrades during their operational service.

On the night of 1 November 1965, five crewmen were lost overboard in a gale while Bergen was off Malin Head, County Donegal. An extensive search by Bergen and another Norwegian ship, as well as the Portrush lifeboat and the British survey ship Dalrymple, found one empty life-raft but no sign of the crew.

Bergen continued to serve in the Royal Norwegian Navy until scrapped in 1967.

== Publications ==
- Colledge, J. J.; Warlow, Ben (2006) [1969]. Ships of the Royal Navy: The Complete Record of All Fighting Ships of the Royal Navy from the 15th Century to the Present (3rd Rev ed.). London: Chatham Publishing. ISBN 978-1-86176-281-8. OCLC 67375475.
- Marriott, Leo (1989). Royal Navy Destroyers Since 1945. Ian Allan Ltd. ISBN 0-7110-1817-0.
- Raven, Alan; Roberts, John (1978). War Built Destroyers O to Z Classes. London: Bivouac Books. ISBN 0-85680-010-4.
- Whitley, M. J. (1988). Destroyers of World War 2. Annapolis, Maryland: Naval Institute Press. ISBN 0-87021-326-1.
