= R61 =

R61 may refer to:

- R61 (South Africa), a road
- HMS Chequers (R61), a destroyer of the Royal Navy
- R61: May cause harm to the unborn child, a risk phrase
