= HMS Chieftain =

C-class destroyer

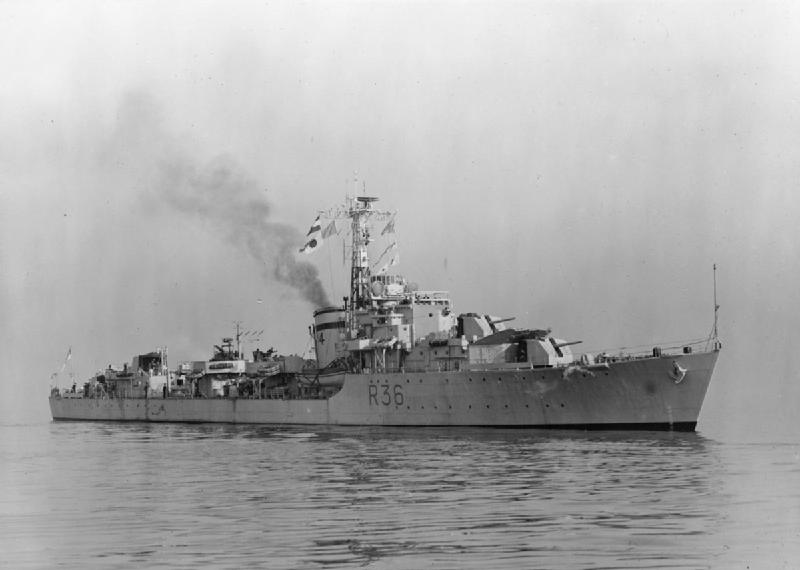
- HMS Chieftain on the River Clyde, 1 March 1946.

History

United Kingdom
- Name: HMS Chieftain
- Ordered: 24 July 1942
- Builder: Scotts Shipbuilding and Engineering Company, (Greenock, Scotland)
- Laid down: 27 June 1943
- Launched: 26 February 1945
- Commissioned: 7 March 1946
- Identification: Pennant number: R36 later changed to D36
- Fate: Scrapped at Sunderland on 20 Mar 1961

General characteristics
- Class & type: C-class destroyer
- Displacement: 1710 tons
- Length: 362.75 ft (110.57 m)
- Beam: 35.66 ft (10.87 m)
- Draught: 10 ft (3.0 m) (mean), 16 ft (4.9 m) (max.)
- Installed power: 40,000 hp (30,000 kW)
- Propulsion: Parsons geared turbines, 2 shafts; 2 Admiralty 3-drum type boilers
- Speed: 36 knots (67 km/h)
- Complement: 186
- Armament: 4 x QF 4.5 in (114 mm) L/45 guns Mark IV on mounts CP Mk.V; 5 x 40 mm anti-aircraft weapons; 4 x 21 inch (533 mm) torpedoes; 2 x Squid anti-submarine mortars (after 1954)

HMS Chieftain was a C-class destroyer of the Royal Navy that was in service from March 1946, and which was scrapped in 1961.

== Construction ==
The Royal Navy ordered Chieftain on 24 July 1942, one of eight Ch subclass of the C-class "Intermediate" destroyers of the 1942 Programme. She was laid down at Scotts Shipbuilding and Engineering Company, Greenock, Scotland, on 27 June 1943, and launched 26 February 1945. She was commissioned on 7 March 1946, too late for World War II duty.

== Service ==
Chieftain was assigned to the 1st Destroyer Squadron based at Malta and served with the Royal Navy's 1945-8 Palestine Patrol, intercepting illegal immigration into Mandate Palestine. In 1947 Chieftain intercepted three immigrant ships: a schooner, a former USCG cutter, and a former USN vessel. The ex-cutter Unalga renamed Chaim Arlosoroff got past the RN destroyer and managed to beach near Haifa: the other two were detained at sea. She was given an interim modernization in 1954, which saw her 'X' turret at the rear of the ship replaced by two Squid anti-submarine mortars. She saw duty during the Suez Crisis in 1956.

== Decommissioning and disposal ==
Chieftain was decommissioned after the Suez Crisis and was scrapped in Sunderland on 20 March 1961.

== Publications ==
- Colledge, J. J.; Warlow, Ben (2006) [1969]. Ships of the Royal Navy: The Complete Record of All Fighting Ships of the Royal Navy from the 15th Century to the Present (3rd Rev ed.). London: Chatham Publishing. ISBN 978-1-86176-281-8. OCLC 67375475.
- Marriott, Leo (1989). Royal Navy Destroyers Since 1945. Ian Allan Ltd. ISBN 0-7110-1817-0.
