= HMS Carron (R30) =

C-class destroyer

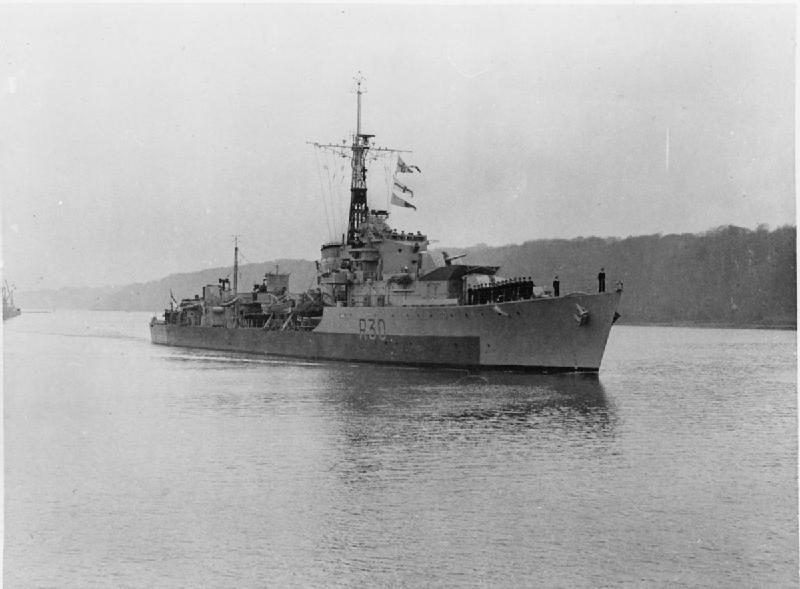
- Carron, 25 March 1945

History

United Kingdom
- Name: Carron
- Ordered: 24 March 1942
- Builder: Scotts, Greenock
- Laid down: 26 November 1942 as Strenuous
- Launched: 28 March 1944
- Completed: 6 November 1944
- Commissioned: 28 July 1944
- Out of service: Paid off on 5 April 1963
- Renamed: Carron before launch
- Identification: Pennant number: R30 initially, but changed to D30 in 1945
- Honours and awards: None
- Fate: Sold for scrap, 10 March 1967
- Badge: On a Field Red, a fountain charged with a Stag's head caboched Gold.

General characteristics (as built)
- Class & type: C-class destroyer
- Displacement: 1,710 long tons (1,740 t) (standard)
- Length: 362 ft 9 in (110.6 m) o/a
- Beam: 35 ft 8 in (10.9 m)
- Draught: 14 ft 6 in (4.4 m) (full load)
- Installed power: 2 Admiralty 3-drum boilers; 40,000 shp (30,000 kW)
- Propulsion: 2 shafts; 2 geared steam turbines
- Speed: 36 knots (67 km/h; 41 mph)
- Range: 4,675 nautical miles (8,658 km; 5,380 mi) at 20 knots (37 km/h; 23 mph)
- Complement: 186
- Armament: 4 × single 4.5 in (114 mm) DP guns; 1 × twin 40 mm (1.6 in) AA gun; 2 × twin and 2 × single 20 mm (0.8 in) AA guns; 2 × quadruple 21 in (533 mm) torpedo tubes; 4 throwers and 2 racks for 108 depth charges

HMS Carron was one of thirty-two C-class destroyers built for the Royal Navy during the Second World War, a member of the eight-ship Ca sub-class. Commissioned in late 1944, she was assigned to the Home Fleet and escorted the fleet's larger ships during operations off German-occupied Norway. Carron was sold for scrap in 1967.

== Design and description ==
The Ca sub-class was a repeat of the preceding Z class. The ships displaced 1,710 long tons (1,740 t) at standard load and 2,575 long tons (2,616 t) at deep load. They had an overall length of 362 feet 9 inches (110.6 m), a beam of 35 feet 8 inches (10.9 m) and a deep draught of 14 feet 6 inches (4.4 m).

The ships were powered by a pair of geared steam turbines, each driving one propeller shaft using steam provided by two Admiralty three-drum boilers. The turbines developed a total of 40,000 indicated horsepower (30,000 kW) and gave a speed of 36 knots (67 km/h; 41 mph) at normal load. During her sea trials, Carron reached a speed of 32 knots (59 km/h; 37 mph) at a load of 2,232 long tons (2,268 t). The Ca-class ships carried enough fuel oil to give them a range of 4,675 nautical miles (8,658 km; 5,380 mi) at 15 knots (28 km/h; 17 mph). Their complement comprised 186 officers and ratings.

The main armament of the destroyers consisted of four QF 4.5-inch (114 mm) Mk IV dual-purpose guns, one superfiring pair each fore and aft of the superstructure protected by partial gun shields. Their anti-aircraft suite consisted of one twin-gun stabilised Mk IV "Hazemeyer" mount for 40-millimetre (1.6 in) Bofors guns amidships and two twin and a pair of single mounts for six 20-millimetre (0.8 in) Oerlikon AA guns. The ships were also fitted with two quadruple mounts amidships for 21-inch (533 mm) torpedo tubes. For anti-submarine work, they were equipped with a pair of depth charge rails and four throwers for 108 depth charges.

== Construction and career ==
Carron was laid down by Scotts at their shipyard in Greenock on 26 November 1942 with the name of Strenuous and was launched on 28 March 1944 by which time she had been renamed. She was commissioned on 6 November and was allocated to the 6th Destroyer Flotilla for service with the Home Fleet. After a refit in mid-1945 to augment her anti-aircraft armament, she was transferred for service in the Far East in June, but joined the East Indies Fleet at Trincomalee, British Ceylon, in August.

=== Post war service ===
Following the war Carron paid off into reserve. She was the first of her class to be selected for modernistion and the work was completed at Chatham. Work included a new bridge and gunnery fire control system, as well as the addition of Squid anti-submarine mortars. The ship emerged from modernisation in 1955 for service with the Dartmouth Training Squadron. Her 'B' gun turret was replaced by a charthouse. In 1960 the ship was further de-equipped so she could serve as a navigational training ship, with only her torpedo tubes remaining and further charthouses fitted on the Squid deck. Carron was paid off on 5 April 1963 and was listed for sale on 30 May. She was sold for scrap to Thos. W. Ward on 10 March 1967 and arrived at the breaker's yard in Inverkeithing on 31 March.

== Bibliography ==
- Chesneau, Roger, ed. (1980). Conway's All the World's Fighting Ships 1922–1946. Greenwich, UK: Conway Maritime Press. ISBN 0-85177-146-7.
- Colledge, J. J.; Warlow, Ben (2006) [1969]. Ships of the Royal Navy: The Complete Record of All Fighting Ships of the Royal Navy from the 15th Century to the Present (3rd Rev ed.). London: Chatham Publishing. ISBN 978-1-86176-281-8. OCLC 67375475.
- English, John (2001). Obdurate to Daring: British Fleet Destroyers 1941–45. Windsor, UK: World Ship Society. ISBN 978-0-9560769-0-8.
- Friedman, Norman (2006). British Destroyers and Frigates, the Second World War and After. Annapolis, Maryland: Naval Institute Press. ISBN 1-86176-137-6.
- Lenton, H. T. (1998). British & Empire Warships of the Second World War. Annapolis, Maryland: Naval Institute Press. ISBN 1-55750-048-7.
- March, Edgar J. (1966). British Destroyers: A History of Development, 1892–1953; Drawn by Admiralty Permission From Official Records & Returns, Ships' Covers & Building Plans. London: Seeley Service. OCLC 164893555.
- Marriott, Leo (1989). Royal Navy Destroyers Since 1945. Ian Allan. ISBN 0-7110-1817-0.
- Preston, Antony (1973). HMS Cavalier and the 'Ca' Class Destroyers. Warship Profile. Vol. 2. Windsor, UK: Profile Publications. OCLC 53090718.
- Rohwer, Jürgen (2005). Chronology of the War at Sea 1939–1945: The Naval History of World War Two (Third Revised ed.). Annapolis, Maryland: Naval Institute Press. ISBN 1-59114-119-2.
- Whitley, M. J. (1988). Destroyers of World War Two: An International Encyclopedia. Annapolis, Maryland: Naval Institute Press. ISBN 0-87021-326-1.
