= HMS Comet (R26) =

C-class destroyer

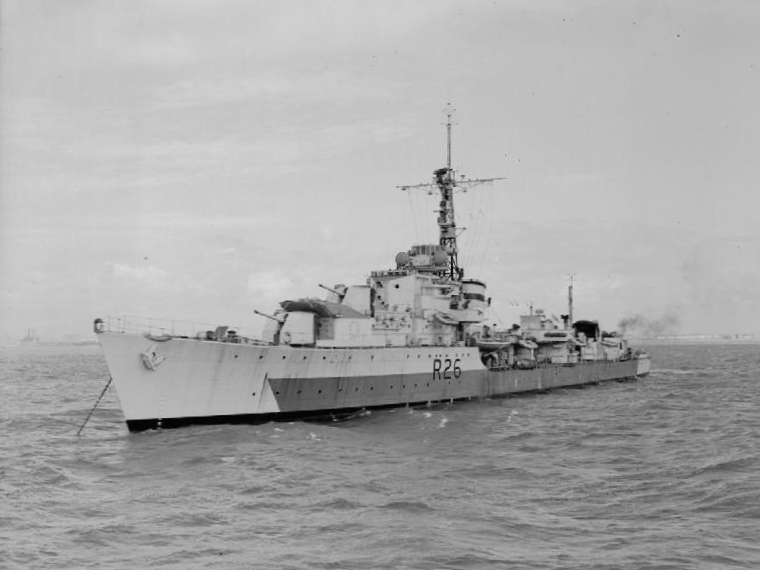
- Comet, 19 September 1945

History

United Kingdom
- Name: Comet
- Builder: Yarrow, Scotstoun
- Laid down: 14 June 1943
- Launched: 22 June 1944
- Commissioned: 6 June 1945
- Out of service: Paid off in February 1958
- Identification: Pennant number: R26 (later D26)
- Fate: Arrived for breaking up at Troon on 23 June 1962

General characteristics (as built)
- Class & type: C-class destroyer
- Displacement: 1,865 long tons (1,895 t) (standard)
- Length: 362 ft 9 in (110.6 m) o/a
- Beam: 35 ft 8 in (10.9 m)
- Draught: 15 ft 3 in (4.6 m) (full load)
- Installed power: 2 Admiralty 3-drum boilers; 40,000 shp (30,000 kW)
- Propulsion: 2 shafts; 2 geared steam turbines
- Speed: 36 knots (67 km/h; 41 mph)
- Range: 4,675 nautical miles (8,658 km; 5,380 mi) at 20 knots (37 km/h; 23 mph)
- Complement: 186
- Armament: 4 × single 4.5 in (114 mm) DP guns; 1 × twin 40 mm (1.6 in) AA gun; 2 × single 2-pdr (40 mm) AA guns; 2 × single 20 mm (0.8 in) AA guns; 2 × quadruple 21 in (533 mm) torpedo tubes; 2 throwers and 2 racks for 35 depth charges

HMS Comet was one of thirty-two C-class destroyers built for the Royal Navy during the Second World War, a member of the eight-ship Co sub-class.

== Design and description ==
The Co sub-class was a repeat of the preceding Ch sub-class. Comet displaced 1,865 long tons (1,895 t) at standard load and 2,515 long tons (2,555 t) at deep load. They had an overall length of 362 feet 9 inches (110.6 m), a beam of 35 feet 8 inches (10.9 m) and a deep draught of 15 feet 3 inches (4.6 m).

The ships were powered by a pair of geared steam turbines, each driving one propeller shaft using steam provided by two Admiralty three-drum boilers. The turbines developed a total of 40,000 indicated horsepower (30,000 kW) and gave a speed of 36 knots (67 km/h; 41 mph) at normal load. During her sea trials, Comet reached a speed of 31.8 knots (58.9 km/h; 36.6 mph) at a load of 2,200 long tons (2,200 t). The Co sub-class carried enough fuel oil to give them a range of 4,675 nautical miles (8,658 km; 5,380 mi) at 20 knots (37 km/h; 23 mph). The ships' complement was 186 officers and ratings.

The main armament of the destroyers consisted of four QF 4.5-inch (114 mm) Mk IV dual-purpose guns, one superfiring pair each fore and aft of the superstructure protected by partial gun shields. Their anti-aircraft suite consisted of one twin-gun stabilised Mk IV "Hazemeyer" mount for 40-millimetre (1.6 in) Bofors guns and two single 2-pounder (40 mm) AA guns amidships, and single mounts for a 20-millimetre (0.8 in) Oerlikon AA gun on the bridge wings. The ships were fitted with one quadruple mount for 21-inch (533 mm) torpedo tubes. The ships were equipped with a pair of depth charge rails and two throwers for 35 depth charges.

== Construction and career ==
Comet was ordered from Yarrow on 12 September 1942 and the ship was laid down on 14 June 1943 at its shipyard in Scotstoun, launched on 22 June 1944 and was commissioned on 6 June 1945.

On commissioning Comet worked up at Scapa Flow, before carrying out occupation duties at Wilhelmshaven in Germany in August and October 1945, before leaving for the Far East for service with the British Pacific Fleet, arriving at Kure, Japan in February 1946. She served as part of the 8th Destroyer Flotilla (later the 8th Destroyer Squadron) during her time in the Far East. She returned to the UK for a refit in 1948. She was given an interim modernization and was fitted for minelaying. The ship then served as part of the 6th Destroyer Squadron in the Home Fleet between 1953 and 1957. Comet was paid off in February 1958. Following her sale she arrived at the breakers yard for scrapping at Troon on 23 October 1962.

== Bibliography ==
- Chesneau, Roger, ed. (1980). Conway's All the World's Fighting Ships 1922–1946. Greenwich, UK: Conway Maritime Press. ISBN 0-85177-146-7.
- Colledge, J. J.; Warlow, Ben (2006) [1969]. Ships of the Royal Navy: The Complete Record of All Fighting Ships of the Royal Navy from the 15th Century to the Present (3rd Rev ed.). London: Chatham Publishing. ISBN 978-1-86176-281-8. OCLC 67375475.
- English, John (2001). Obdurate to Daring: British Fleet Destroyers 1941–45. Windsor, UK: World Ship Society. ISBN 978-0-9560769-0-8.
- Friedman, Norman (2006). British Destroyers and Frigates, the Second World War and After. Annapolis, Maryland: Naval Institute Press. ISBN 1-86176-137-6.
- Lenton, H. T. (1998). British & Empire Warships of the Second World War. Annapolis, Maryland: Naval Institute Press. ISBN 1-55750-048-7.
- March, Edgar J. (1966). British Destroyers: A History of Development, 1892–1953; Drawn by Admiralty Permission From Official Records & Returns, Ships' Covers & Building Plans. London: Seeley Service. OCLC 164893555.
- Marriott, Leo (1989). Royal Navy Destroyers Since 1945. Ian Allan. ISBN 0-7110-1817-0.
- Whitley, M. J. (1988). Destroyers of World War Two: An International Encyclopedia. Annapolis, Maryland: Naval Institute Press. ISBN 0-87021-326-1.
