= HMS Chaplet =

C-class destroyer

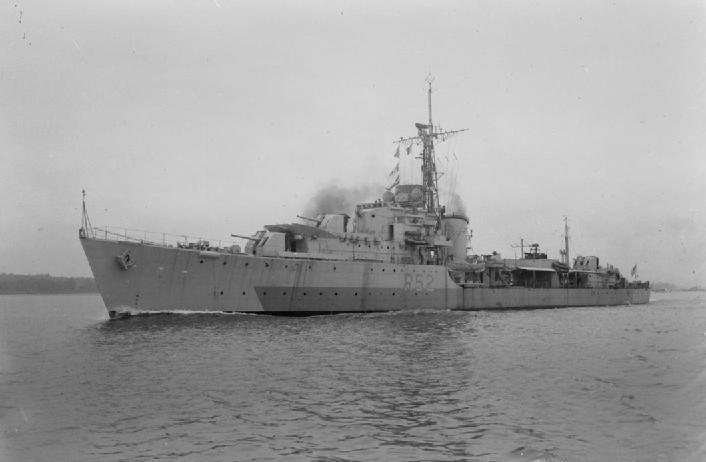
- HMS Chaplet on completion, 13 August 1945

History

United Kingdom
- Name: HMS Chaplet
- Ordered: 24 July 1942
- Builder: Thornycroft, Woolston
- Laid down: 29 April 1943
- Launched: 18 July 1944
- Commissioned: 24 August 1945
- Decommissioned: 1961
- Identification: Pennant number: R52 later changed to D52
- Fate: Arrived for scrapping at Hughes Bolckow, Blyth on 6 November 1965

General characteristics
- Class & type: C-class destroyer
- Displacement: 1710 tons
- Length: 362.75 ft (110.57 m)
- Beam: 35.66 ft (10.87 m)
- Draught: 10 ft (3.0 m) (mean), 16 ft (4.9 m) (max.)
- Installed power: 40,000 hp (30,000 kW)
- Propulsion: Parsons geared turbines, 2 shafts; 2 Admiralty 3-drum type boilers
- Speed: 36 knots (67 km/h; 41 mph)
- Complement: 186
- Armament: 4 X QF 4.5 in (5 in) L/45 guns; 4 X 20 mm Oerlikon anti-aircraft weapons; 4 X 21 inch (533 mm) torpedoes; 2 X Squid ASW mortars (after 1954)

HMS Chaplet was a C-class destroyer of the Royal Navy that was in service from August 1945, and which was scrapped in 1965.

== Construction ==
The Royal Navy ordered Chaplet on 24 July 1942, one of eight "Ch" subclass "Intermediate" destroyers of the 1942 Programme. She was laid down at the yard of Thornycroft, Woolston on 29 April 1943 and commissioned on 24 August 1945, too late for service in the Second World War.

== Service ==
Chaplet was assigned to the 1st Destroyer Squadron based at Malta in the early 1950s. She was given an interim modernisation in 1954, which saw her 'X' turret at the rear of the ship replaced by two Squid anti-submarine mortars. She saw duty during the Suez Crisis in 1956.

On 22 May 1959, Chaplet collided with the Icelandic patrol boat Óðinn when on fishery protection duties. Óðinn's lifeboat was destroyed in the collision, which Chaplet's commanding officer blamed on a misjudgement by Óðinn, while Óðinn's captain claimed that Chaplet had deliberately rammed Óðinn.

== Decommissioning and disposal ==
Chaplet was decommissioned and laid up in 1961. She was sold for scrapping to Hughes Bolckow and arrived at their yard at Blyth on 6 November 1965.

== Publications ==
- Colledge, J. J.; Warlow, Ben (2006) [1969]. Ships of the Royal Navy: The Complete Record of All Fighting Ships of the Royal Navy from the 15th Century to the Present (3rd Rev ed.). London: Chatham Publishing. ISBN 978-1-86176-281-8. OCLC 67375475.
- Marriott, Leo (1989). Royal Navy Destroyers Since 1945. Ian Allan Ltd. ISBN 0-7110-1817-0.
