= HNoMS Trondheim (1946) =

C-class destroyer

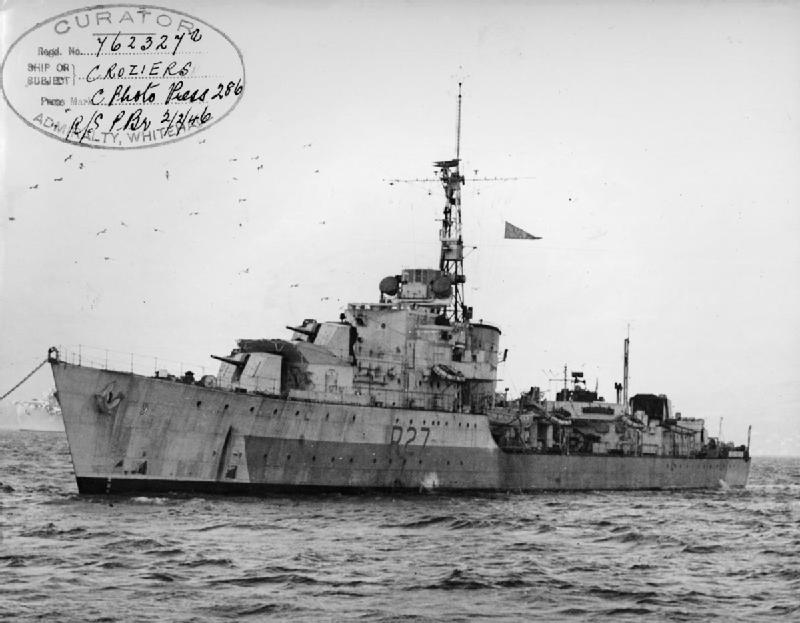
- HMS Croziers, 22 December 1945

History

United Kingdom
- Name: HMS Croziers
- Builder: Yarrow, Scotstoun
- Laid down: 23 October 1943
- Launched: 19 August 1944
- Completed: 30 November 1945
- Out of service: 1945
- Identification: Pennant number: R27
- Fate: Sold to the Royal Norwegian Navy

History

Norway
- Name: Trondheim
- Commissioned: 1946
- Identification: Pennant number: D305
- Fate: Removed from active list, May 1961

General characteristics
- Class & type: C-class destroyer
- Displacement: 1,710 tons (standard) 2,520 tons (full)
- Length: 363 ft (111 m) o/a
- Beam: 35.75 ft (10.90 m)
- Draught: 10 ft (3.0 m) light; 14.5 ft (4.4 m) full
- Propulsion: 2 Admiralty 3-drum boilers, Parsons geared steam turbines, 40,000 shp (30,000 kW), 2 shafts
- Speed: 37 knots (69 km/h)
- Range: 615 tons oil, 1,400 nautical miles (2,600 km) at 32 knots (59 km/h)
- Complement: 186
- Armament: 4 × QF 4.5 in (114 mm) L/45 guns Mark IV on mounts CP Mk.V; 2 × Bofors 40 mm L/60 guns on twin mount "Hazemeyer" Mk.IV; 4 × anti-aircraft mountings; Bofors 40 mm, single mount Mk.III; QF 2-pdr Mk VIII, single mount Mk.XVI; Oerlikon 20 mm, single mount P Mk.III; Oerlikon 20 mm, twin mount Mk.V; 1 × quadruple tubes for 21 inch (533 mm) torpedoes Mk.IX; 4 × depth charge throwers

HNoMS Trondheim was a C-class destroyer built for the Royal Navy as HMS Croziers. She was built by Yarrow Shipbuilders, Scotstoun during 1944 and 1945. On completion she was sold to the Royal Norwegian Navy in 1946 and renamed Trondheim. She was scrapped in 1961.

== Operational service ==
Commissioned too late for service in the Second World War, following sale her pennant number was changed to D305. She was one of four Cr-class destroyers sold to Norway. Unlike many other destroyers of this class, none of the Norwegian ships received any significant upgrades during their operational service.

Trondheim continued to serve in the Royal Norwegian Navy until removed from the active list in 1961.

== Publications ==
- Colledge, J. J.; Warlow, Ben (2006) [1969]. Ships of the Royal Navy: The Complete Record of All Fighting Ships of the Royal Navy from the 15th Century to the Present (3rd Rev ed.). London: Chatham Publishing. ISBN 978-1-86176-281-8. OCLC 67375475.
- Marriott, Leo (1989). Royal Navy Destroyers Since 1945. Ian Allan Ltd. ISBN 0-7110-1817-0.
- Raven, Alan; Roberts, John (1978). War Built Destroyers O to Z Classes. London: Bivouac Books. ISBN 0-85680-010-4.
- Whitley, M. J. (1988). Destroyers of World War 2. Annapolis, Maryland: Naval Institute Press. ISBN 0-87021-326-1.
