= HMS Chequers =

C-class destroyer

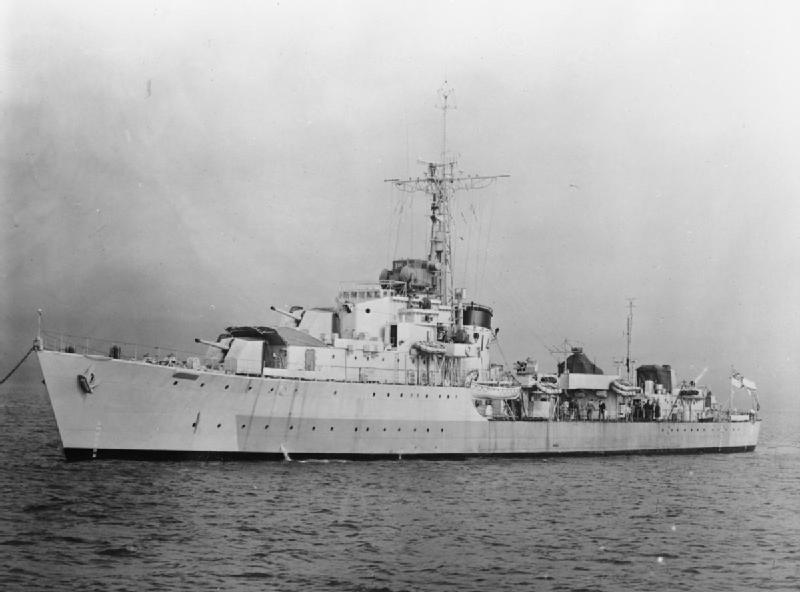
- HMS Chequers on completion, 15 September 1945.

History

United Kingdom
- Name: HMS Chequers
- Ordered: 24 July 1942
- Builder: Scotts Shipbuilding and Engineering Company, (Greenock, Scotland)
- Laid down: 4 May 1943
- Launched: 30 October 1944
- Commissioned: 28 September 1945
- Identification: Pennant number: R61 later changed to D61
- Fate: Sold to John Cashmore Ltd on 23 July 1966

General characteristics
- Class & type: C-class destroyer
- Displacement: 1710 tons
- Length: 362.75 ft (110.57 m)
- Beam: 35.66 ft (10.87 m)
- Draught: 10 ft (3.0 m) (mean), 16 ft (4.9 m) (max.)
- Installed power: 40,000 hp (30,000 kW)
- Propulsion: Parsons geared turbines, 2 shafts; 2 Admiralty 3-drum type boilers
- Speed: 36 knots (67 km/h; 41 mph)
- Complement: 186
- Armament: 4 x QF 4.5 in (114 mm) L/45 guns Mark IV on mounts CP Mk.V; 4 x 20 mm anti-aircraft weapons; 4 x 21 inch (533 mm) torpedoes; 2 x Squid anti-submarine mortars (after 1954)

HMS Chequers was a C-class destroyer, of the "Ch" subclass, of the Royal Navy that was in service from December 1945, and which was scrapped in 1966.

== Construction ==
The Royal Navy ordered Chequers on 24 July 1942, one of eight C-class "Intermediate" destroyers of the 1942 Programme. She was built by Scotts Shipbuilding and Engineering Company, Greenock, Scotland and commissioned on 28 September 1945, too late for service during the Second World War.

== Service ==
Chequers was assigned to, and became leader of, the 1st Destroyer Squadron based at Malta between 1948 and 1954. She saw service, along with other Royal Navy ships, in preventing illegal immigration into Palestine in 1947. She was given an interim modernisation in 1954, which saw her 'X' turret at the rear of the ship replaced by two Squid anti-submarine mortars.

== Decommissioning and disposal ==
Chequers was decommissioned and placed in Operational reserve in 1954. She was placed on the disposal list in 1964. She was sold to John Cashmore Ltd for scrapping and arrived at their yard in Newport, Wales on 23 July 1966.

== Publications ==
- Colledge, J. J.; Warlow, Ben (2006) [1969]. Ships of the Royal Navy: The Complete Record of All Fighting Ships of the Royal Navy from the 15th Century to the Present (3rd Rev ed.). London: Chatham Publishing. ISBN 978-1-86176-281-8. OCLC 67375475.
- Marriott, Leo (1989). Royal Navy Destroyers Since 1945. Ian Allan Ltd. ISBN 0-7110-1817-0.
