= HMS Cambrian (R85) =

C-class destroyer

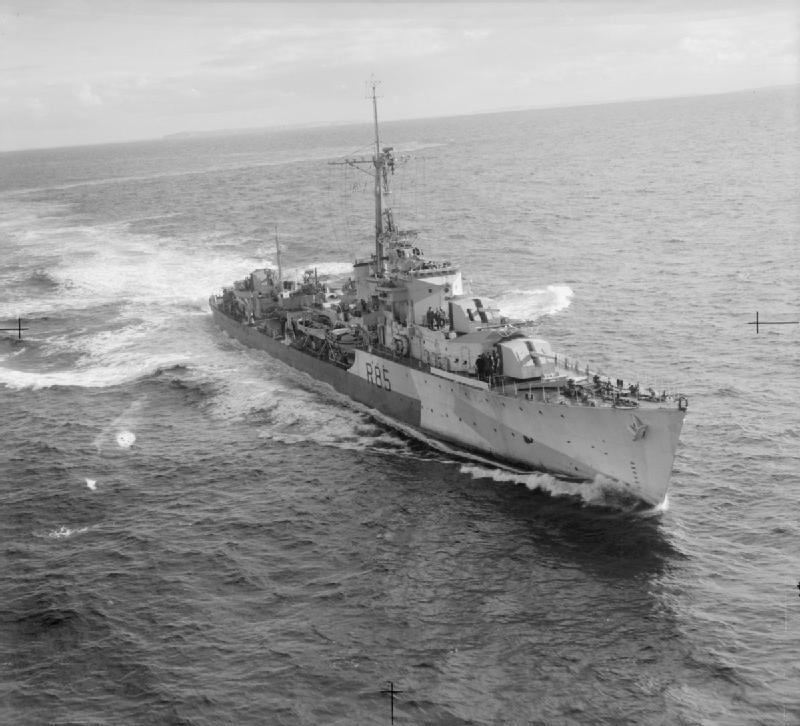
- Cambrian, 1944

History

United Kingdom
- Name: Cambrian
- Ordered: 16 February 1942
- Builder: Scotts, Greenock
- Laid down: 14 August 1942 as Spitfire
- Launched: 10 December 1943
- Completed: 17 July 1944
- Commissioned: 17 July 1944
- Decommissioned: 1968
- Renamed: Cambrian before launch
- Identification: Pennant number: R85 initially, but changed to D85 in 1945
- Motto: Parves pars magna: 'Of a small people I am a great part'.
- Honours and awards: Navarino 1827 - China 1860 - Arctic 1944
- Fate: Sold for scrap, August 1971
- Badge: On a Field White, On a mount Green the Dragon of Wales.

General characteristics (as built)
- Class & type: C-class destroyer
- Displacement: 1,710 long tons (1,740 t) (standard)
- Length: 362 ft 9 in (110.6 m) o/a
- Beam: 35 ft 8 in (10.9 m)
- Draught: 14 ft 6 in (4.4 m) (full load)
- Installed power: 2 Admiralty 3-drum boilers; 40,000 shp (30,000 kW)
- Propulsion: 2 shafts; 2 geared steam turbines
- Speed: 36 knots (67 km/h; 41 mph)
- Range: 4,675 nautical miles (8,658 km; 5,380 mi) at 20 knots (37 km/h; 23 mph)
- Complement: 186
- Armament: 4 × single 4.5 in (114 mm) DP guns; 1 × twin 40 mm (1.6 in) AA gun; 2 × twin and 2 × single 20 mm (0.8 in) AA guns; 2 × quadruple 21 in (533 mm) torpedo tubes; 4 throwers and 2 racks for 108 depth charges

HMS Cambrian was one of eight C-class destroyers built for the Royal Navy during the Second World War. commissioned in mid-1944, she was assigned to the Home Fleet and escorted two Arctic convoys as well as larger elements of the fleet during operations off the German-occupied Norwegian coast.

== Design and description ==
The Ca-class destroyer was a repeat of the preceding Z class. The ships displaced 1,710 long tons (1,740 t) at standard load and 2,575 long tons (2,616 t) at deep load. They had an overall length of 362 feet 9 inches (110.6 m), a beam of 35 feet 8 inches (10.9 m) and a deep draught of 14 feet 6 inches (4.4 m).

The ships were powered by a pair of geared steam turbines, each driving one propeller shaft using steam provided by two Admiralty three-drum boilers. The turbines developed a total of 40,000 indicated horsepower (30,000 kW) and gave a speed of 36 knots (67 km/h; 41 mph) at normal load. During her sea trials, Cambrian reached a speed of 33 knots (61 km/h; 38 mph) at a load of 2,290 long tons (2,330 t). The Ca-class ships carried enough fuel oil to give them a range of 4,675 nautical miles (8,658 km; 5,380 mi) at 15 knots (28 km/h; 17 mph). Their complement consisted of 186 officers and ratings.

The main armament of the destroyers consisted of four QF 4.5-inch (114 mm) Mk IV dual-purpose guns, one superfiring pair each fore and aft of the superstructure protected by partial gun shields. Their anti-aircraft suite consisted of one twin-gun stabilised Mk IV "Hazemeyer" mount for 40-millimetre (1.6 in) Bofors guns amidships and two twin and a pair of single mounts for six 20-millimetre (0.8 in) Oerlikon AA guns. The ships were also fitted with two quadruple mounts amidships for 21-inch (533 mm) torpedo tubes. For anti-submarine work, they were equipped with a pair of depth charge rails and four throwers for 108 depth charges.

== Construction and career ==
Cambrian was laid down by Scotts Shipbuilding & Engineering at their shipyard in Greenock on 14 August 1942 with the name of Spitfire and was launched on 10 December 1943 by which time she had been renamed. She was commissioned on 17 July and was allocated to the 6th Destroyer Flotilla for service with the Home Fleet. After a refit in mid-1945 to augment her anti-aircraft armament, she was transferred for service in the Far East in June, but joined the East Indies Fleet at Trincomalee, British Ceylon, in August.

=== Post war service ===
Following the war Cambrian paid off into reserve. Along with other Ca group destroyers, she was selected for modernisation in 1963. Work included a new enclosed bridge and Mark 6M gunnery fire control system, as well as the addition of two triple Squid anti-submarine mortars.

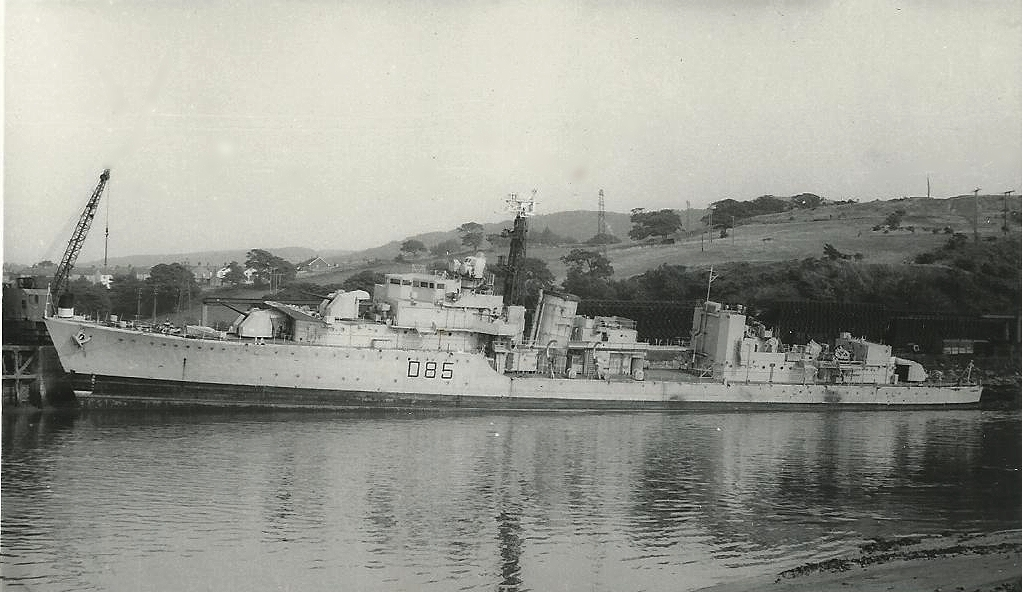
Cambrian at Briton Ferry for scrapping, 1971

In January 1964 Cambrian saw operational service off the coast of East Africa, as part of the operation to quell the mutiny by the Tanganyika Rifles. The destroyer operated as part of a force, along with the aircraft carrier Centaur, which landed Royal Marines from 45 Commando. Cambrian used her three 4.5-inch guns to provide naval gunfire support.

During January 1968, Cambrian, who had been on duties near Mauritius in preparation for the islands upcoming independence was diverted to the outlying island of Rodrigues to quell a reported uprising by some of the populace. The so-called uprising consisted of a number of individuals who had been arrested by the local authorities for looting a government food storage warehouse and appropriating a supply of sweet potatoes following a devastating hurricane on Christmas Eve 1967 that had left them homeless and penniless. At this point it is believed that the authorities requested assistance which was provided by the destroyer. On her early morning arrival the ships 4.5" guns were fired (With blanks it is believed) and an armed landing party was provided. The landing party patrolled with the local police for several weeks to help restore order again.

Cambrian was paid off in December 1968. She was sold for scrap to Thos. W. Ward in August 1971 and arrived at their breaker's yard at Briton Ferry on 3 September.

== Bibliography ==
- Chesneau, Roger, ed. (1980). Conway's All the World's Fighting Ships 1922–1946. Greenwich, UK: Conway Maritime Press. ISBN 0-85177-146-7.
- Colledge, J. J.; Warlow, Ben (2006) [1969]. Ships of the Royal Navy: The Complete Record of All Fighting Ships of the Royal Navy from the 15th Century to the Present (3rd Rev ed.). London: Chatham Publishing. ISBN 978-1-86176-281-8. OCLC 67375475.
- English, John (2001). Obdurate to Daring: British Fleet Destroyers 1941–45. Windsor, UK: World Ship Society. ISBN 978-0-9560769-0-8.
- Friedman, Norman (2006). British Destroyers and Frigates, the Second World War and After. Annapolis, Maryland: Naval Institute Press. ISBN 1-86176-137-6.
- Lenton, H. T. (1998). British & Empire Warships of the Second World War. Annapolis, Maryland: Naval Institute Press. ISBN 1-55750-048-7.
- March, Edgar J. (1966). British Destroyers: A History of Development, 1892–1953; Drawn by Admiralty Permission From Official Records & Returns, Ships' Covers & Building Plans. London: Seeley Service. OCLC 164893555.
- Marriott, Leo (1989). Royal Navy Destroyers Since 1945. Ian Allan. ISBN 0-7110-1817-0.
- Preston, Antony (1973). HMS Cavalier and the 'Ca' Class Destroyers. Warship Profile. Vol. 2. Windsor, UK: Profile Publications. OCLC 53090718.
- Rohwer, Jürgen (2005). Chronology of the War at Sea 1939–1945: The Naval History of World War Two (Third Revised ed.). Annapolis, Maryland: Naval Institute Press. ISBN 1-59114-119-2.
- Whitley, M. J. (1988). Destroyers of World War Two: An International Encyclopedia. Annapolis, Maryland: Naval Institute Press. ISBN 0-87021-326-1.
