= HMS Caesar (R07) =

C-class destroyer

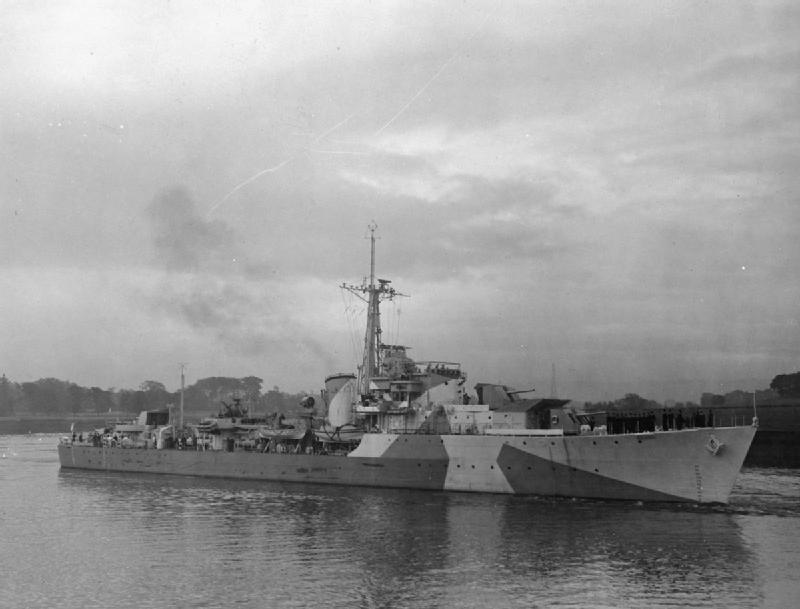
- Caesar upon completion, October 1944

History

United Kingdom
- Name: Caesar
- Ordered: 16 February 1942
- Builder: John Brown, Clydebank
- Laid down: 3 April 1943 as Ranger
- Launched: 12 February 1944
- Completed: 3 October 1944
- Commissioned: 17 July 1944
- Renamed: Renamed Caesar before launch
- Identification: Pennant number: R07 initially, but changed to D07 in 1945
- Motto: Veni, vidi vici
- Honours and awards: Glorious First of June 1794 - Cut of Gibraltar 1801 - Strachan's Action 1805 - Basque Roads 1809 - Walcheren 1809 - Baltic 1854
- Fate: Sold for scrap, 13 December 1966
- Badge: On a Field Blue, the head of Caesar, gold

General characteristics (as built)
- Class & type: C-class destroyer
- Displacement: 1,730 long tons (1,760 t) (standard)
- Length: 362 ft 9 in (110.6 m) o/a
- Beam: 35 ft 8 in (10.9 m)
- Draught: 14 ft 6 in (4.4 m) (full load)
- Installed power: 2 Admiralty 3-drum boilers; 40,000 shp (30,000 kW)
- Propulsion: 2 shafts; 2 geared steam turbines
- Speed: 36 knots (67 km/h; 41 mph)
- Range: 4,675 nautical miles (8,658 km; 5,380 mi) at 20 knots (37 km/h; 23 mph)
- Complement: 222
- Armament: 4 × single 4.5 in (114 mm) DP guns; 1 × twin 40 mm (1.6 in) AA gun; 2 × twin and 2 × single 20 mm (0.8 in) AA guns; 2 × quadruple 21 in (533 mm) torpedo tubes; 4 throwers and 2 racks for 108 depth charges

HMS Caesar was one of thirty-two C-class destroyers built for the Royal Navy during the Second World War, a member of the eight-ship Ca sub-class. Commissioned in 1944, she was built as a flotilla leader with additional accommodation for staff officers. The ship was assigned to Home Fleet during 1944–1945 and escorted one Arctic convoy as well as the capital ships of the fleet.

== Design and description ==
The Ca-class destroyer was a repeat of the preceding Z class. The ships displaced 1,730 long tons (1,760 t) at standard load and 2,575 long tons (2,616 t) at deep load. They had an overall length of 362 feet 9 inches (110.6 m), a beam of 35 feet 8 inches (10.9 m) and a deep draught of 14 feet 6 inches (4.4 m).

The ships were powered by a pair of geared steam turbines, each driving one propeller shaft using steam provided by two Admiralty three-drum boilers. The turbines developed a total of 40,000 indicated horsepower (30,000 kW) and gave a speed of 36 knots (67 km/h; 41 mph) at normal load. During her sea trials, Caesar reached a speed of 34.3 knots (63.5 km/h; 39.5 mph) at a load of 2,400 long tons (2,400 t). The Ca-class ships carried enough fuel oil to give them a range of 4,675 nautical miles (8,658 km; 5,380 mi) at 15 knots (28 km/h; 17 mph). As a flotilla leader, Caesar's complement was 222 officers and ratings.

The main armament of the destroyers consisted of four QF 4.5-inch (114 mm) Mk IV dual-purpose guns, one superfiring pair each fore and aft of the superstructure protected by partial gun shields. Their anti-aircraft suite consisted of one twin-gun stabilised Mk IV "Hazemeyer" mount for 40-millimetre (1.6 in) Bofors guns amidships and two twin and a pair of single mounts for six 20-millimetre (0.8 in) Oerlikon AA guns. The ships were also fitted with two quadruple mounts amidships for 21-inch (533 mm) torpedo tubes. For anti-submarine work, they were equipped with a pair of depth charge rails and four throwers for 108 depth charges.

== Construction and career ==
Caesar was laid down by John Brown & Company at their shipyard in Clydebank on 6 April 1943 with the name of Ranger and was launched on 14 February 1944 by which time she had been renamed. She was commissioned on 5 October and was allocated to the 6th Destroyer Flotilla for service with the Home Fleet. After a refit in mid-1945 to augment her anti-aircraft armament, she was transferred for service in the Far East in June, but joined the East Indies Fleet at Trincomalee, British Ceylon, in August.

=== Post war service ===
Following the war Caesar paid off into reserve. Along with other Ca group destroyers, she was selected for modernisation which was completed at Rosyth between 1957 and 1960. Work included a new enclosed bridge and Mark 6M gunnery fire control system, as well as the addition of two triple Squid anti-submarine mortars. She re-commissioned in September 1960 as leader of the 8th Destroyer Squadron with most of her service performed in the Far East.

Caesar was paid off in June 1965 and was de-equipped at Chatham. She was subsequently sold to Hughes Bolckow on 13 December 1966, arriving at their breaker's yard at Blyth, Northumberland, for scrapping on 6 January 1967.

== Bibliography ==
- Chesneau, Roger, ed. (1980). Conway's All the World's Fighting Ships 1922–1946. Greenwich, UK: Conway Maritime Press. ISBN 0-85177-146-7.
- Colledge, J. J.; Warlow, Ben (2006) [1969]. Ships of the Royal Navy: The Complete Record of All Fighting Ships of the Royal Navy from the 15th Century to the Present (3rd Rev ed.). London: Chatham Publishing. ISBN 978-1-86176-281-8. OCLC 67375475.
- English, John (2001). Obdurate to Daring: British Fleet Destroyers 1941–45. Windsor, UK: World Ship Society. ISBN 978-0-9560769-0-8.
- Friedman, Norman (2006). British Destroyers and Frigates, the Second World War and After. Annapolis, Maryland: Naval Institute Press. ISBN 1-86176-137-6.
- Lenton, H. T. (1998). British & Empire Warships of the Second World War. Annapolis, Maryland: Naval Institute Press. ISBN 1-55750-048-7.
- March, Edgar J. (1966). British Destroyers: A History of Development, 1892–1953; Drawn by Admiralty Permission From Official Records & Returns, Ships' Covers & Building Plans. London: Seeley Service. OCLC 164893555.
- Marriott, Leo (1989). Royal Navy Destroyers Since 1945. Ian Allan. ISBN 0-7110-1817-0.
- Preston, Antony (1973). HMS Cavalier and the 'Ca' Class Destroyers. Warship Profile. Vol. 2. Windsor, UK: Profile Publications. OCLC 53090718.
- Rohwer, Jürgen (2005). Chronology of the War at Sea 1939–1945: The Naval History of World War Two (Third Revised ed.). Annapolis, Maryland: Naval Institute Press. ISBN 1-59114-119-2.
- Whitley, M. J. (1988). Destroyers of World War Two: An International Encyclopedia. Annapolis, Maryland: Naval Institute Press. ISBN 0-87021-326-1.
