= C-class destroyer (1943) =

1943 class of destroyers of the Royal Navy

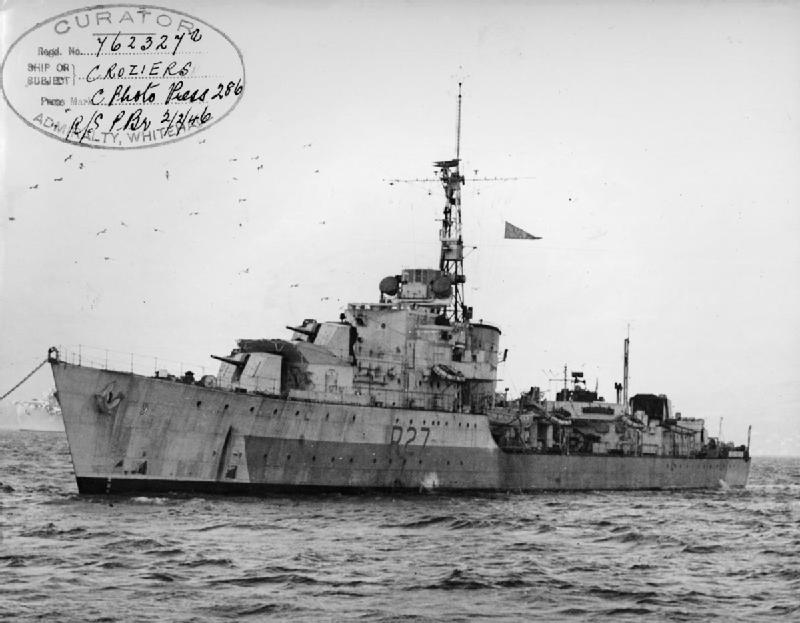
- HMS Croziers on 22 December 1945

Class overview
- Operators: Royal Navy; Royal Norwegian Navy; Royal Canadian Navy; Pakistan Navy
- Preceded by: W and Z class
- Succeeded by: Weapon class
- Subclasses: Ca-, Ch-, Co-, Cr-
- In commission: 1944 - 1972
- Planned: 34
- Completed: 32
- Cancelled: 2
- Retired: 31
- Preserved: 1

General characteristics Ca class
- Type: Destroyer
- Displacement: 1,710 long tons (1,740 t) standard; 2,530 long tons (2,570 t) full load
- Length: 362 ft 9 in (110.57 m) o/a; 339 ft 6 in (103.48 m) pp
- Beam: 35 ft 9 in (10.90 m)
- Draught: 10 ft (3.05 m)
- Propulsion: 2 Admiralty 3-drum boilers, Parsons single-reduction geared steam turbines, 40,000 shp (30 MW), 2 shafts
- Speed: 36 kn (67 km/h; 41 mph); 32 kn (59 km/h; 37 mph) (full load)
- Range: 4,675 nautical miles (8,658 km; 5,380 mi) at 20 knots (37 km/h; 23 mph); 1,400 nautical miles (2,600 km; 1,600 mi) at 32 knots (59 km/h; 37 mph)
- Complement: 186 (222 as leader)
- Armament: 4 × QF 4.5-inch (113 mm) L/45 Mk IV guns on mounts CP Mk.V; 2 × Bofors 40 mm L/60 guns on twin mount "Hazemeyer" Mk.IV; 4 × Single QF 2-pounder (40 mm) Mk.XVI guns; 8 (2 × 4) tubes for 21-inch (533 mm) torpedoes Mk.IX; 80 Depth charges

General characteristics (Ch-, Co- & Cr- class)
- Displacement: 1,900 long tons (1,930 t) standard; 2,535 long tons (2,576 t) full load
- Draught: 10 ft 6 in (3.20 m)
- Armament: 4 × QF 4.5-inch (113-mm) L/45 Mk IV guns on mounts CP Mk.V; 2 × Bofors 40 mm L/60 guns on twin mount "Hazemeyer" Mk.IV; 2 × single 2-pounder; 2 × 20 mm Oerlikon cannon
- Notes: Other characteristics as per Ca- class

The C class was a class of 32 destroyers of the Royal Navy that were launched from 1943 to 1945. The class was built in four flotillas of 8 vessels, the "Ca", "Ch", "Co" and "Cr" groups or sub-classes, ordered as the 11th, 12th, 13th and 14th Emergency Flotillas respectively. The sub-class names are derived from the initial 2 letters of the member ships' names, although the "Ca" class were originally ordered with a heterogeneous mix of traditional destroyer names. A fifth flotilla, the "Ce" or 15th Emergency Flotilla, was planned but were cancelled in favour of the Weapon-class destroyers after only the first two ships had been ordered. The pennant numbers were all altered from "R" superior to "D" superior at the close of World War II; this involved some renumbering to avoid duplications.

== Design ==
They were built as part of the War Emergency Programme, based on the hull and machinery of the pre-war J class, incorporating whatever advances in armament and naval radar were available at the time. Some of the class were completed in time for wartime service. All ships used the Fuze Keeping Clock High Angle Fire Control Computer.

The "Ca" flotilla were generally repeats of the preceding Z class, and as such had a main gun armament of four QF 4.5-inch (113-mm) Mk IV guns on Mk V mounts, which could elevate to 55 degrees to give an anti-aircraft capability. Close-in anti-aircraft armament generally consisted of two 40mm Bofors guns in a twin stabilized Hazemayer mount, supplemented by four single 2-pounder "pom-pom" anti aircraft guns on power operated mounts. Caprice differed in having a quadruple 2-pounder "pom-pom" instead of the Hazemayer Bofors mount, while Cassandra had eight Oerlikon 20 mm cannon instead of the single pom-poms. Torpedo armament consisted of eight 21 in (533 mm) torpedoes in two quadruple mounts, while 70 depth charges could be carried.

The succeeding "Ch", "Co" and "Cr" flotillas were fitted with the new Mk VI HA/LA Director instead of the Mk I Type K director of the Z and Ca classes, while remote power control (RPC) gunlaying equipment was fitted. The additional weight of the new fire control equipment and the powered mountings for the 4.5 inch guns (Note: The new director weighed 10 t compared with 6 t for the Mk I Type K, while adding RPC to the 4.5 in mounts increased weight by 1.7 t per mount.) meant that only one quadruple torpedo mount was fitted, and the depth charge armament was reduced to 35 depth charges. Most of the ships were fitted with a single Hazemayer Bofors mount, although some of the later ships instead had the lighter and simpler Mk V twin Bofors mount. This was normally supplemented by two power operated single pom-pom mounts and two 20 mm Oerlikon cannon. They also introduced the all-welded hull into Royal Navy destroyer construction, beginning in Contest, with the "Cr" flotilla all being of all-welded construction. Late delivery of the Mk VI directors delayed completion such that all but one of the "Ch"s, "Co"s or "Cr"s entered service after the end of the Second World War. Only Comet was commissioned before VJ Day, in June 1945, albeit too late to see action.

Caprice was the last destroyer built for the Royal Navy to be fitted with the ubiquitous quadruple QF 2 pounder "pom-pom" mounting Mark VII.

The "Ca" flotilla were reconstructed in the late 1950s and early 1960s to be modernised for anti-submarine warfare and to serve as fast fleet escorts. One bank of torpedo tubes and one 4.5 in gun was removed, allowing two Squid triple-barreled anti-submarine mortars to be fitted, while the ships' obsolete gun Mk I Type K director was replaced by a modern Mk 6M director as fitted to Royal Navy frigates, and the remaining 4.5 in guns fitted with RPC. Close in anti-aircraft armament was standardised as a single Mk V twin and two single 40 mm Bofors mounts. The ships were also fitted with new bridges; the post-refit bridge differed between the first four conversions (Cavendish, Carron, Cavalier and Carysfort), with open bridges and the later four (Caprice, Cassandra, Caesar and Cambrian) which were given frigate-type enclosed bridges.

The remaining "Ch", "Co" and Cr" ships in the Royal Navy were given a less extensive modernisation, with one 4.5 in gun being replaced by twin Squids, modified fire control and a close in anti aircraft armament of 1 twin and four single Bofors guns. Chieftain, Chaplet and Comet were fitted as minelayers.

=== Engineering ===
The class were all fitted with two Admiralty 3-drum boilers with a pressure of 300 pounds per square inch (2,100 kPa) at 630 °F (332 °C). All had Parsons single-reduction geared turbines, generating 40,000 shaft horsepower (30,000 kW) at 350 RPM, and driving the two shafts to produce a maximum of 36 knots (67 km/h; 41 mph) (32 knots (59 km/h; 37 mph) under full load condition). All were engined by their builders except Cossack and Constance, which were engined by Parsons. Their bunkers could hold 615 tons of oil fuel, giving them a radius of 4,675 nautical miles (8,658 km; 5,380 mi) at 20 knots (37 km/h; 23 mph) and 1,400 nautical miles (2,600 km; 1,600 mi) at 32 knots (59 km/h; 37 mph).

== Ships ==
=== "Ca" (or 11th Emergency) Flotilla ===
This flotilla was authorised under the 1941 Programme. The first pair was ordered from Yarrow on 16 February 1942; the other six were ordered on 24 March, a pair each from John Brown, Scotts and Cammell Laird. However, on 12 August 1942 the contract for the last pair was moved from Cammell Laird to White. Their originally-allocated names were altered to new names beginning with "Ca-" in November 1942. The John Brown pair - Caesar and Cavendish - were fitted as Leaders.

On completion they formed the 6th Destroyer Flotilla for service in the Home Fleet. At the end of the war in Europe the flotilla was transferred to the East Indies Fleet and the ships arrived on station between August and November 1945, too late to see service against Japan. They remained in the Indian Ocean until May 1946 when they returned home and paid off into operational reserve.

Ships of the "Ca" (11th Emergency) Flotilla
Name	Pennant	Builder	Laid Down	Launched	Commissioned	Fate
Caprice (ex-Swallow)	R01 later D01	Yarrow, Scotstoun	28 September 1942	16 September 1943	5 April 1944	Modernised by Yarrow 1959. Paid off March 1973. Scrapped 1979 at Queenborough.
Cassandra (ex-Tourmaline)	R62 later D10	Yarrow, Scotstoun	3 January 1943	29 November 1943	28 July 1944	Modernised by Yarrow 1960. Paid off January 1966. Scrapped at Inverkeithing in 1967.
Caesar (Note: flotilla leader) (ex-Ranger)	R07 later D07	John Brown, Clydebank	3 April 1943	14 February 1944	5 October 1944	Modernised 1957–60 at Rosyth. Paid off June 1965. Scrapped 1967 at Blyth.
Cavendish (ex-Sibyl)	R15 later D15	John Brown, Clydebank	19 May 1943	12 April 1944	13 December 1944	Modernised 1956. Laid up 1964. Scrapped 1967 at Blyth.
Cambrian (ex-Spitfire)	R85 later D85	Scotts, Greenock	14 August 1942	10 December 1943	14 July 1944 by John Brown	Modernised 1963. Paid off December 1968. Scrapped 1971 at Briton Ferry.
Carron (ex-Strenuous)	R30 later D30	Scotts, Greenock	26 November 1942	28 March 1944	6 November 1944	Modernised August 1955 as Training Ship. Paid off March 1963. Scrapped 1967 at Inverkeithing.
Cavalier (ex-Pellew)	R73 later D73	White, Cowes	28 February 1943	7 April 1944	22 November 1944	Modernised 1957. Paid off July 1972. Sold October 1977 to be preserved as a museum ship, since 1999 preserved at Chatham Historic Dockyard, Kent.
Carysfort (ex-Pique)	R25 later D25	White, Cowes	12 May 1943	25 July 1944	20 February 1945	Modernised 1956. Paid off February 1969. Scrapped 1970 at Newport.

=== "Ch" (or 12th Emergency) Flotilla ===
Six destroyers, the first of 26 'Intermediate' destroyers to be authorised under the 1942 Programme, were ordered on 24 July 1942, a pair each from Thornycroft, Scotts and Alexander Stephen. The fourth pair was originally intended to be ordered from Vickers Armstrongs, Walker-on-Tyne, but instead were ordered from Denny on 30 July. The Chequers and Childers were fitted as Leaders.

Ships of the "Ch" (12th Emergency) Flotilla
Name	Pennant	Builder	Laid Down	Launched	Commissioned	Fate
Chaplet	R52	Thornycroft, Woolston	29 April 1943	18 July 1944	24 August 1945	Laid up 1961. Sold for scrapping 1965.
Charity	R29	Thornycroft, Woolston	9 July 1943	30 November 1944	19 November 1945	Transferred to Pakistan Navy as Shah Jehan 16 December 1958, irreparably damaged by Indian Navy warships off Karachi 4 December 1971 and scrapped as a result
Chequers (Note: flotilla leader)	R61	Scotts, Greenock	4 May 1943	30 October 1944	28 September 1945	Laid up 1964, scrapped 1966.
Chieftain	R36	Scotts, Greenock	27 June 1943	26 February 1945	7 March 1946	Scrapped 1961.
Chevron	R51	Alex. Stephen, Linthouse	18 March 1943	23 February 1944	23 August 1945	Accommodation ship at Rosyth, scrapped 1969.
Cheviot	R90	Alex. Stephen, Linthouse	27 April 1943	2 May 1944	11 December 1945	Harbour training ship at Rosyth 1960. Sold for scrapping 1962.
Childers	R91	Denny, Dumbarton	27 November 1943	27 February 1945	19 December 1945	Laid up 1958. Sold for scrapping 1963.
Chivalrous	R21	Denny, Dumbarton	27 November 1943	22 June 1945	13 May 1946	Transferred to Pakistan Navy on 29 June 1954 as Taimur, scrapped 1961.

=== "Co" (or 13th Emergency) Flotilla ===
The first four of these destroyers were ordered in August 1942 - Comus and Concord on 7th, Contest on 12th and Consort on 14th. The remaining four destroyers were ordered on 12 September; Constance and Cossack were fitted as Leaders.

Ships of the "Co" (13th Emergency) Flotilla
Name	Pennant	Builder	Laid Down	Launched	Commissioned	Fate
Comus	R43	Thornycroft	21 August 1943	14 March 1945	8 July 1946	Sold for scrapping 1958.
Concord (ex-Corso)	R63	Thornycroft	18 November 1943	14 May 1945	20 December 1946	Harbour Training Ship Rosyth. Sold for scrapping 1962.
Contest	R12 (later D48)	White	1 November 1943	16 December 1944	9 November 1945	Sold for scrapping 1960
Consort	R76	Stephen	26 May 1943	19 October 1944	19 March 1946	Sold for scrapping 1961
Cockade	R34	Yarrow	11 March 1943	7 March 1944	29 September 1945	Paid off 1958. Sold for scrapping 1964.
Comet	R26	Yarrow	14 June 1943	22 June 1944	6 June 1945	Paid off 1958. Sold for scrapping 1962.
Constance (Note: flotilla leader)	R71	Vickers Armstrongs, Walker	18 March 1943	22 August 1944	31 December 1945	Sold for scrapping 1956.
Cossack	R57	Vickers Armstrongs, Walker	18 March 1943	10 May 1944	4 September 1945	Sold for scrapping 1961.

=== "Cr" (or 14th Emergency) Flotilla ===
All eight destroyers were ordered on 12 September 1942, two each from John Brown, Yarrow, White and Scotts; the John Brown pair - Crescent and Crusader - were fitted as Leaders.

Ships of the "Cr" (14th Emergency) Flotilla
Name	Pennant	Builder	Laid Down	Launched	Commissioned	Fate
Crescent (Note: flotilla leader)	R16	John Brown	16 August 1943	20 July 1944	21 August 1945	To Canada 1945, extensive modernisation to anti-submarine Destroyer Escort 1952–56. Scrapped 1971.
Crusader	R20	John Brown	15 November 1943	5 October 1944	26 November 1945	To Canada 1945, Scrapped 1964.
Croziers	R27	Yarrow	26 October 1943	19 August 1944	30 November 1945	To Norway as Trondheim 1945, sold for scrapping 1961.
Crystal	R38	Yarrow	13 January 1944	12 February 1945	6 February 1946	To Norway as Stavanger 1945, scrapped 1967.
Crispin (ex-Craccher)	R68	White	1 February 1944	23 June 1945	10 July 1946	To Pakistan as Jahangir 18 March 1958, scrapped 1982.
Creole	R82	White	3 August 1944	22 November 1945	14 October 1946	To Pakistan as Alamgir 20 June 1958, scrapped 1982.
Cromwell (ex-Cretan)	R35	Scott's	24 November 1943	6 August 1945	16 September 1946	To Norway as Bergen 1946, scrapped 1967.
Crown	R46	Scott's	16 January 1944	19 December 1945	17 April 1947	To Norway as Oslo 1945, scrapped 1968.

=== "Ce" (or 15th Emergency) Flotilla ===
Two ships of this putative flotilla, the last of the 26 "Intermediate"-type destroyers authorised under the 1942 Programme, were ordered on 3 February 1942 from White. These two ships were to be named Centaur and Celt. However, with the decision to introduce a fresh design of Intermediate destroyer (which became the Weapon-class destroyer design), the White orders were amended to the new design and the names of the two ships were altered to Tomahawk and Sword respectively. Tomahawk was subsequently renamed again, becoming Scorpion, while Sword was finally cancelled on 15 October 1945.

== Image gallery ==
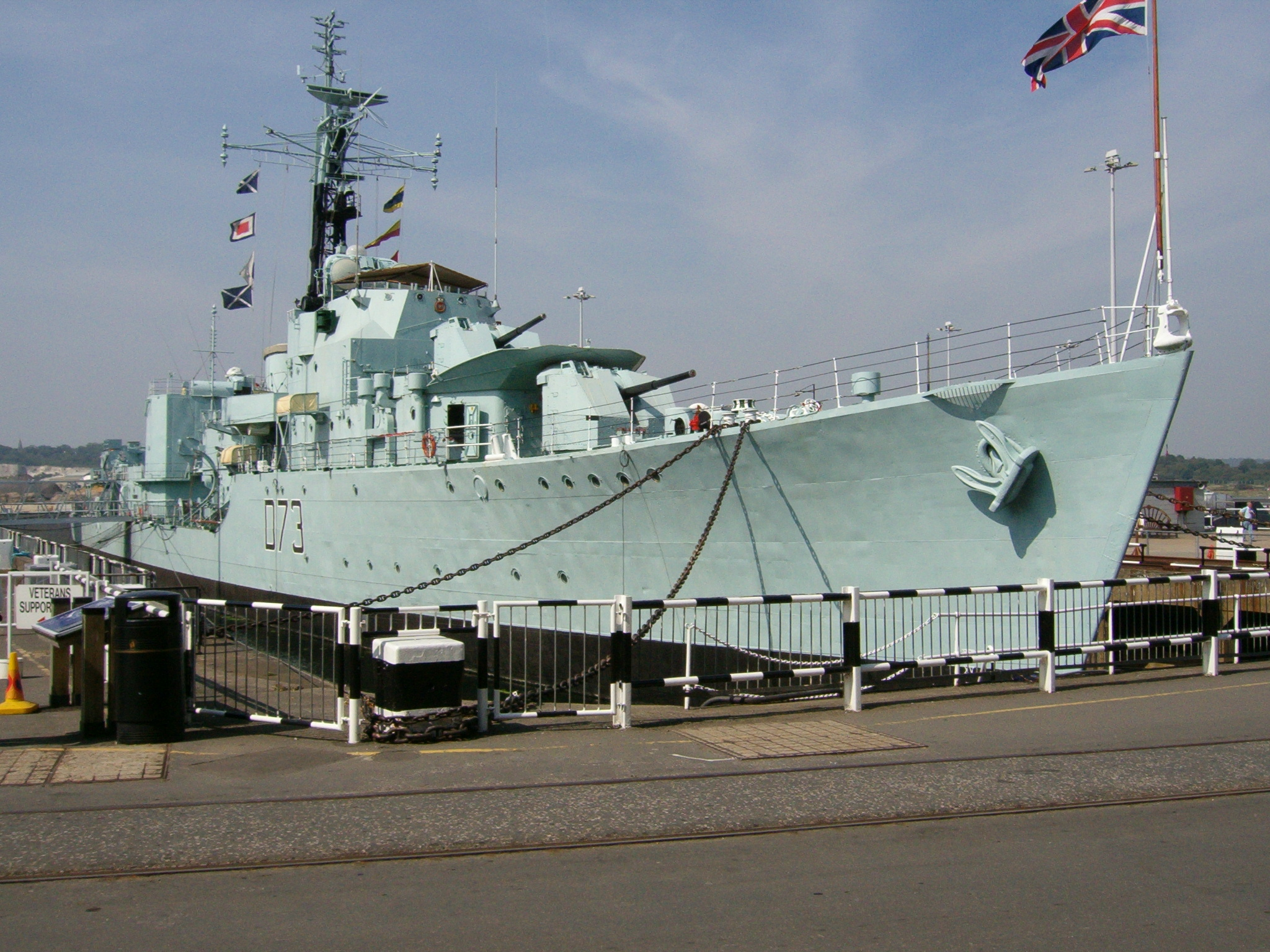
HMS Cavalier, Britain's only remaining World War II destroyer, preserved as a museum ship at Chatham Historic Dockyard.

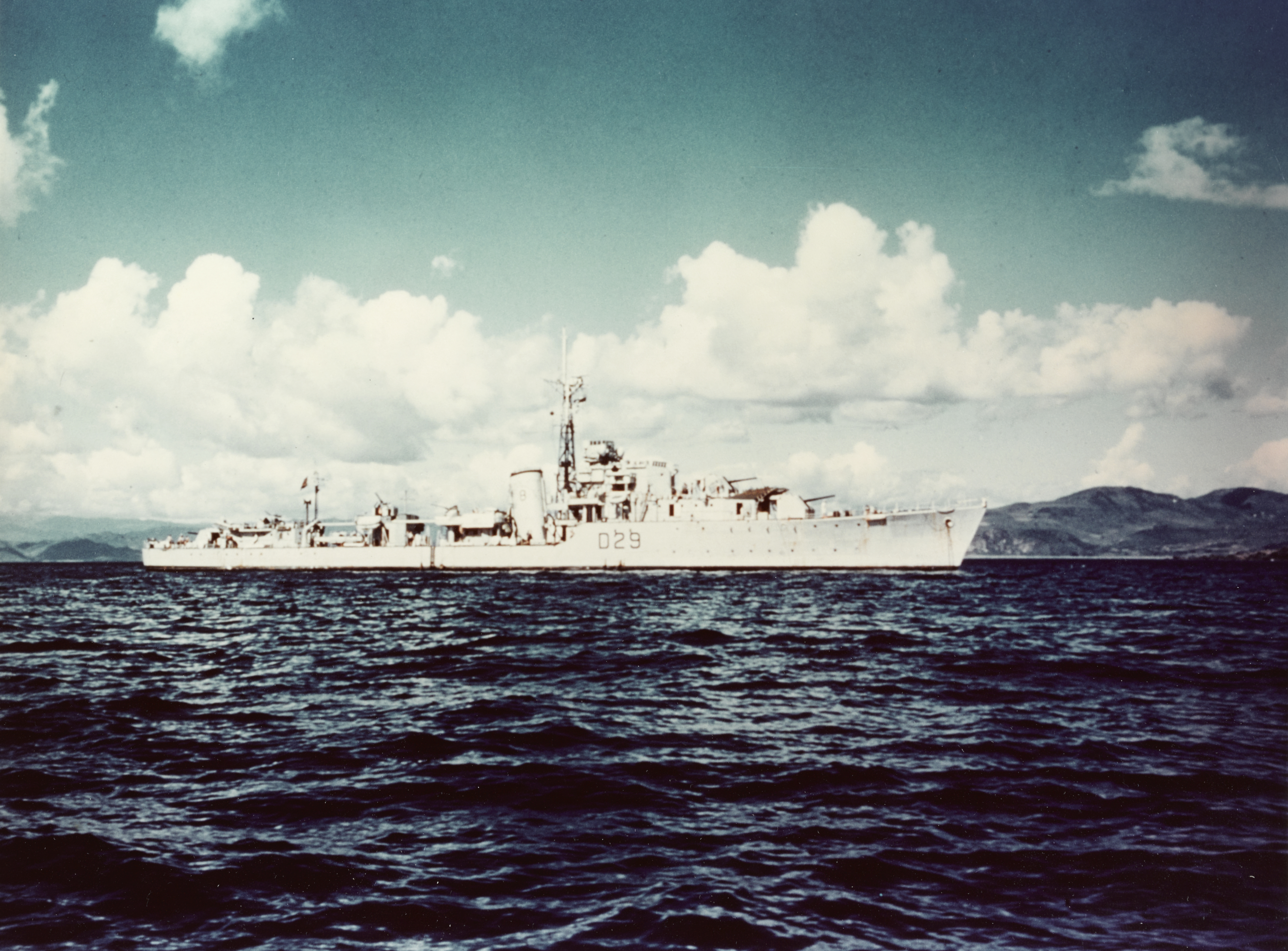
HMS Charity, Korea, 1952.

== See also ==
- List of ship classes of the Second World War

== Publications ==
- Maurice Cocker, Destroyers of the Royal Navy, 1893-1981, Ian Allan: London, 1981. ISBN 0-7110-1075-7
- Mike Critchley, British Warships Since 1945: Part 3: Destroyers, Maritime Books: Liskeard, UK, 1982. ISBN 0-9506323-9-2.
- Norman Friedman, British Destroyers & Frigates: The Second World War and After, Chatham Publishing, ISBN 1-86176-137-6
- Gardiner, Robert; Chesneau, Roger, eds. (1980). Conway's All The World's Fighting Ships 1922–1946. London: Conway Maritime Press. ISBN 0-85177-146-7.
- Robert Gardiner and Stephen Chumbley, Conway's All The World's Fighting Ships 1947–1995, Naval Institute Press: Annapolis, Maryland, USA, 1995. ISBN 1-55750-132-7.
- David Hobbs, C Class Destroyers, Maritime Books: Liskeard, UK, 2012. ISBN 1904459498
- Peter Hodges and Norman Friedman, Destroyer Weapons of World War 2, Naval Institute Press: Annapolis Maryland, USA, 1979. ISBN 0-87021-929-4.
- H. T. Lenton, British and Empire Warships of the Second World War, Greenhill Books, ISBN 1-85367-277-7
- H. T. Lenton, Navies of the Second World War: British Fleet & Escort Destroyers Volume Two, Macdonald: London, 1970. ISBN 0-356-03122-5
- George Moore, Building for Victory: The Warship Building Programmes of the Royal Navy 1939 - 1945, World Ship Society, ISBN 0-9543310-1-X
- M. J. Whitley, Destroyers of World War Two: An International Encyclopedia, Cassell and Co.: London, 2000. ISBN 1-85409-521-8.
