= 1st Destroyer Squadron =

- Active: October 1951 – January 1970
- Country: United Kingdom
- Branch: Royal Navy
- Size: Squadron

Commanders
- First: Captain Charles E. Keys
- Last: Captain James W.M. Pertwee

The 1st Destroyer Squadron was an administrative unit of the Royal Navy from 1951 to 1970.

== Operational history ==
Originally established as the 1st Destroyer Flotilla in 1947 it was renamed in 1st Destroyer Squadron in October 1951. During its existence, the squadron included C-class and Battle-class destroyers and Leander-class frigates. Ships from the squadron saw service in the Mediterranean Fleet, the Far East Fleet, in the Beira Patrol and as part of the Standing Naval Force Atlantic (STANAVFORLANT).

Of note: Command structure organizational changes took place within Royal Navy post war period the term Flotilla was previously applied to a tactical unit until 1951 which led to the creation of three specific Flag Officers, Flotillas responsible for the Eastern, Home and Mediterranean fleets the existing destroyer flotillas were re-organized now as administrative squadrons.

== Squadron commander ==
Commander	Ship	Dates
Captain Charles E. Keys	HMS Chequers	October 1951-April 1953
Captain Ralph C.M. Duckworth	HMS Chequers	April 1953-June 1954
Captain Hugh S. Mackenzie	HMS Chevron	June 1954 -November 1955
Captain Arthur E.T. Christie	HMS Chieftain	November 1955-May 1957
Captain Robert L. Alexander	HMS Solebay	May 1957-November 1958
Captain Herbert J. Lee	HMS Solebay	November 1958-June 1960
Captain John Smallwood	HMS Solebay	June 1960-1962
Captain Thomas W. Stocker	HMS Dido	March 1965-October 1966
Captain Roger E. Wykes-Sneyd	HMS Dido	October 1966-May 1968
Captain James W.M. Pertwee	HMS Euryalus	May 1968-January 1970

== See also ==
- List of squadrons and flotillas of the Royal Navy
