= QF 4.5-inch Mk I – V naval gun =

Ordnance QF 4.5 inch gun Mk I, II, III, IV, V
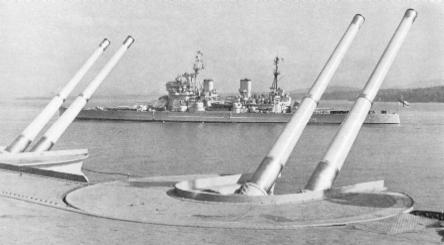
- Mk III guns in BD 'RP10' Mk II mountings on Implacable-class aircraft carrier. A King George V-class battleship (1939) can be seen in the background.
- Type: Naval gun Anti-aircraft gun
- Place of origin: United Kingdom

Service history
- Used by: British Commonwealth
- Wars: Second World War; Korean War; Falklands War

Production history
- No. built: Navy: c. 800; Army: 474

Specifications
- Barrel length: Bore: 16 ft 8 in (5.08 m); 45 calibres
- Shell: Fixed or Separate QF; 113 640–645 mm R
- Shell weight: 55 pounds (24.9 kg)×
- Calibre: 4.45-inch (113 mm)
- Breech: Mks I - IV: Horizontal sliding block Mk V: Vertical sliding block
- Elevation: 0° to +80°
- Traverse: 360°
- Rate of fire: 12 RPM for Mk II BD mount. 16 RPM recorded for Mk III UD mount.
- Muzzle velocity: 2,449 ft/s (746 m/s)
- Maximum firing range: 20,750 yd (18,970 m) at 2,449 ft/s (746 m/s); AA:41,000 ft (12,500 m)

The QF 4.5 inch gun has been the standard medium-calibre naval gun used by the Royal Navy as a medium-range weapon capable of use against surface, aircraft and shore targets since 1938. This article covers the early 45-calibre family of guns up to the 1970s. For the later unrelated 55-calibre Royal Navy gun, see 4.5 inch Mark 8 naval gun. Like all British nominally 4.5 inch naval guns, the QF Mk I has an actual calibre of 4.45 inches (113 mm).

== Background ==
From the BL Mark I gun of 1916 the 4.7-inch (120 mm) calibre was the mid-calibre weapon of the Royal Navy, used particularly on destroyers. Apart from some ships armed with QF 4-inch Mk V guns due to shortages, it remained the standard weapon for destroyers up to the W-class destroyers of 1943. Its usefulness as an anti-aircraft weapon had been limited by the failure to develop a mounting with elevation over 55°, the lack of a predictive fire control system in destroyer classes built prior to the introduction of the 4.7 inch twin mount (see HACS), and the setting of fuzes by hand on early, pre-war, mountings. Later 4.7 inch mountings used mechanical fuze setters that were identical to those used on the 4.5 inch mountings.

== History ==
The QF 4.5 inch L/45 was developed originally as a dual-purpose weapon with which to arm aircraft carriers and reconstructed battleships and battlecruisers. It was later developed as a new dual-purpose weapon with which to arm destroyers, supplanting the ubiquitous 4.7 inch gun. Despite the lower calibre, it had a heavier shell, resulting in a more powerful weapon.

== Variants ==
The nomenclature system for guns used by the Royal Navy can be somewhat confusing. The gun and mounting each have their own Mark number and a letter(s) giving additional information. QF stands for quick firing, UD for upper deck, BD for between decks and CP for central pivot.

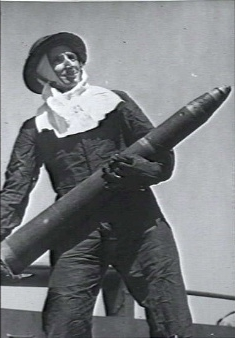
Gunner with early fixed round, 1942

- QF Mark I: adopted after failure of a 5-inch gun project and used a fixed round, which proved to be somewhat heavy for the loaders to keep up the intended firing rate. Was fitted in twin mountings UD Mark III.
- QF Mark II: Land service used by the British Army.
- QF Mark III: same as Mark I, except for firing mechanism. Was fitted in twin mountings BD Mark II, BD Mark II** and BD Mark IV. HMS Illustrious fired about 3,000 rounds of 4.5-inch ammunition, at an average of 12 rounds per gun per minute, during one action in January 1941.
- QF Mark IV: used a two part (charge and shell) ammunition system. Designed for use by small warships. Fitted in mountings BD Mark IV, CP Mark V and UD Mark VI.
- QF Mark V: a further development of the Mark IV, designed for anti-aircraft use with remote power control (RPC, where the guns automatically train and elevate the target following the director) and a high rate-of-fire assisted by automatic ramming. Carried in the mounting UD Mark VI, with separate high-angle and low-angle hoists for the two types of ammunition (AA and SAP/HE) and a third for the cartridges. The rate of fire of the Mk V was 24 rounds per minute when power-loaded, 12–14 when hand-loaded, and up to 18 in burst mode when hand-loaded. Some 800 naval 4.5-inch guns of various marks were built. 474 guns were built for the army, all in 1939–41.

During the 1950s, a change was made in weapons systems nomenclature which focused on the gun mount rather than the gun. Together with a change from Roman numerals, the Gun QF Mark V on mounting BD Mark VI became simply the Mark 6. The Mark 7 was never produced as the planned Malta-class aircraft carriers they would have been used on were never built. The majority of new escort vessels built for the Royal Navy in the 1950s and 1960s carried at least one Mark 6 mounting, with two in the Leopard-class frigates and County-class destroyers and three in the Daring-class destroyers. This gave these ships a level of firepower unprecedented only 15 years earlier. The Type 81 Tribal-class frigates were an exception, using reconditioned Mark V mounts from scrapped C-class destroyers that were fitted with RPC and known as the Mark 5* Mod 1. The evolution of the 45-calibre 4.5 inch gun family ended with the Mark V gun / Mark 6 mounting. It has been replaced by a new weapon of original design, the 4.5 inch Mark 8 with a 55 calibre-long barrel.

== Naval service ==
Ships with 4.5 inch guns QF Mark I in twin mounting UD Mark III

- aircraft carrier HMS Ark Royal
- Dido-class cruisers HMS Scylla and HMS Charybdis
- naval auxiliaries

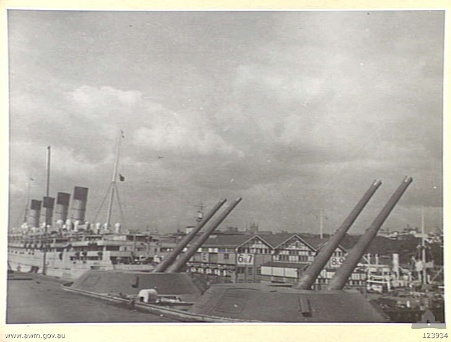
Twin Mark III guns on Illustrious-class aircraft carrier HMS Formidable

Ships with 4.5 inch guns QF Mark III in twin mounting BD Mark II

- Reconstructed Queen Elizabeth-class battleships HMS Queen Elizabeth and HMS Valiant
- Reconstructed Renown-class battlecruiser HMS Renown
- Illustrious-class aircraft carrier
- Implacable-class aircraft carrier
- Aircraft carrier HMS Indomitable
- Destroyer HMS Savage

Ships with 4.5 inch guns QF Mark III in twin mounting BD Mark II**

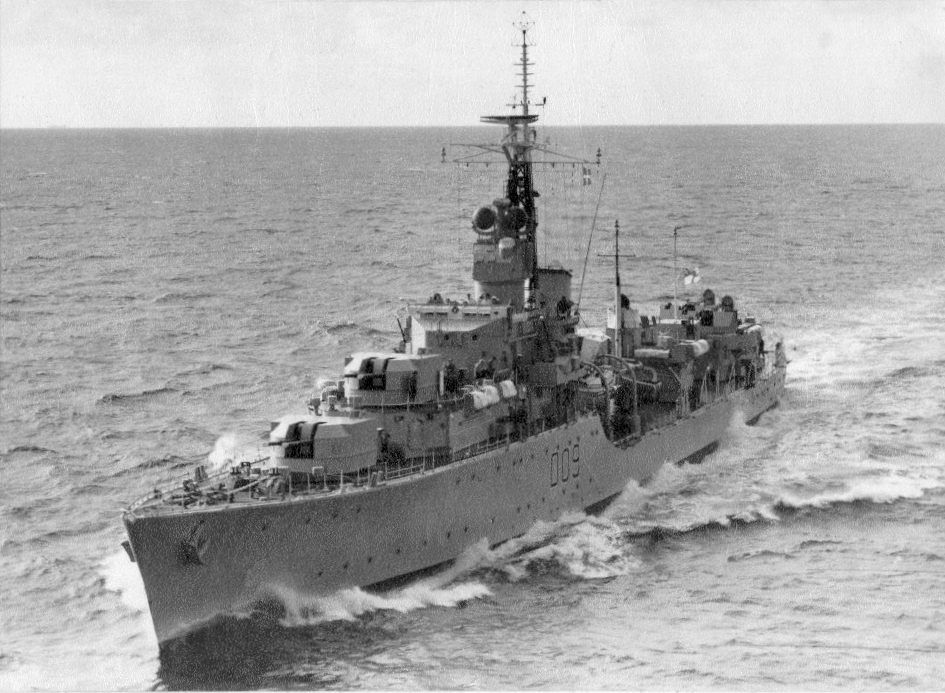
The Battle-class destroyer HMS Dunkirk, with two twin mountings BD Mark IV for Mark III guns.

- Audacious-class aircraft carriers, HMS Eagle and HMS Ark Royal - removed during refits in 1960s

Ships with 4.5 inch guns QF Mark III in twin mounting BD Mark IV

- Battle-class destroyer
- Nueva Esparta-class destroyers D-11 Nueva Esparta, D-21 Zulia and D-31 Aragua

Ships with 4.5 inch guns QF Mark IV in single mounting CP Mark V

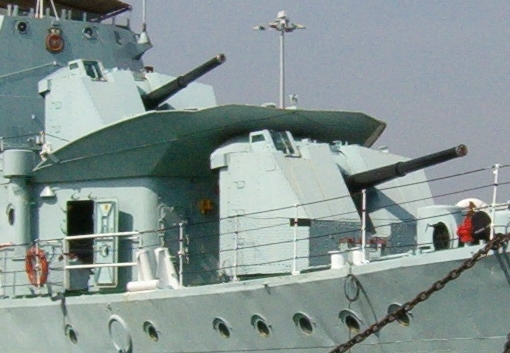
The forward 4.5 inch guns Mark 5* of HMS Cavalier, on rebuilt CP Mark V mountings.

- Destroyer HMS Savage
- Z-class destroyers
- Ca, Ch, Co and Cr-class destroyers
- "1942" Battle-class destroyers

Ships with 4.5 inch guns Mark 5* (rebuilt mounting CP Mark V).

- Rebuilt Ca-class destroyers (Mark 5* Mod 1)
- Type 81 Tribal-class frigates (Mark 5* Mod 2)

Ships with 4.5 inch guns QF Mark V in twin mounting UD Mark VI (later renamed gun Mark 6)

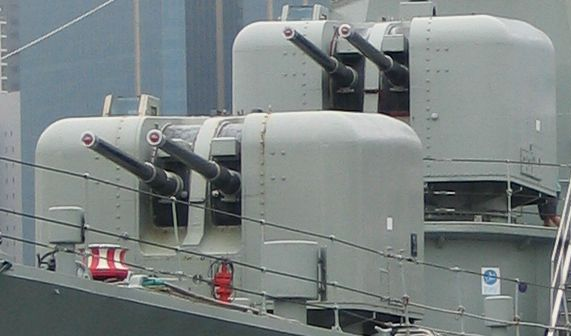
Twin mountings, Upper Deck, Mark VI on post-war on Daring-class destroyer HMAS Vampire (D11). BD-s in contrast were semi-submerged turrets used on some of the major warships.

- Battle-class destroyers - "1943" or "Australian Battle" class
- Daring-class destroyers
- County-class destroyers
- Type 12 Whitby-class frigates
- Type 12I Rothesay-class frigates
- Type 12M Leander-class frigates
  - Van Speijk-class frigates - Netherlands Navy versions of Leander class
  - River-class destroyer escorts - Australian versions
  - Condell-class frigates - Chilean versions
- Type 41 Leopard-class frigates
- Type 61 Salisbury-class frigates

== Land service ==
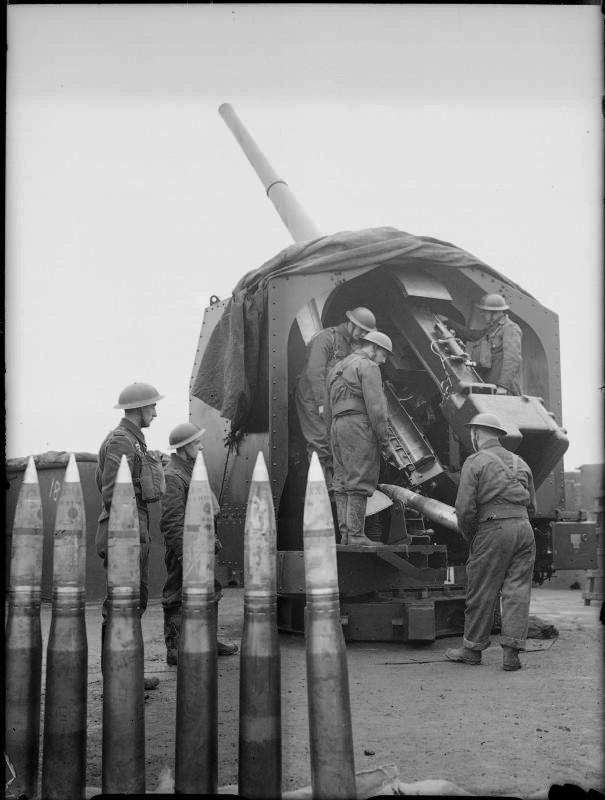
4.5 inch anti-aircraft gun and crew near Sittingbourne, Kent, January 1941

QF Mark II was a single gun mounting (Mounting Mk 1) anti-aircraft gun in static sites. The pedestal mount was bolted to concrete in an unarmoured turret, a travelling platform was available to transport the gun and mounting between positions. The first unit became operational in February 1939. These 16.5 ton anti-aircraft mountings had a maximum elevation angle of 80 degrees. However, most mountings were Mark 1A with an elevation range of -9.5 to 80 degrees. This enabled the gun to be dual role (anti-aircraft and coastal defence) in coastal areas. Armour piercing rounds were provided for anti-ship engagements.

The guns were fitted with Magslip electrical data transfer from Predictors AA Nos 3, 5 and 10 and were probably used initially with GL radars and UB 10 18 feet base optical height and range finders. AA control radars evolved rapidly. The gun was laid and fuzes set by pointer matching, it is unclear the extent to which advances in 3.7-inch fire control were applied to 4.5-inch. During the war Machine Fuze Setter No 10 was added, This improved the rate of fire from 8 to 10 rounds per minute and raised the effective ceiling to 34,500 feet. Gun positions were usually in the vicinity of naval bases where they could use the naval ammunition supply. Initially the standard fuze was an igniferous design, No 199 with a maximum running time of 30 seconds that limited performance. Subsequently, No 209 a mechanical time fuze was introduced. It appears that VT fuzes were not issued. Guns were usually deployed in troops of 4 as part of a two-troop battery, although sections of two guns occupied some positions. Deployment included:

UK (Royal Artillery) June 1940:

- 1st AA Division - 48
- 2nd AA Division - 40
- 3rd AA Division - 64
- 4th AA Division - 52
- 5th AA Division - 24
- 6th AA Division - 52
- 7th AA Division - 64

(the AA divisions included 3-inch and 3.7-inch regiments in addition to 4.5-inch)

Far East January 1942:

- Singapore - 4 (Hong Kong & Singapore Artillery)

Mediterranean June 1943:

- Malta - 10

Middle East January 1943:

- Aden - 2 (Hong Kong & Singapore Artillery)
- Port Said - 2 (Royal Malta Artillery)

West Africa Dec 1941:

- Takoradi - 6

India Dec 1941:

- Bombay - 6

Colonel Probert of the Armaments Research Department developed rifling with tapered groove depth and with the last few inches of the barrel being smoothbore. This was used with a 4.5 barrel lined down to 3.7 inches but retaining the large chamber, allowing a large propelling charge to be employed. Ordnance, QF 3.7 inch Mk 6, only on a static mounting, entered service in 1943 and continued in service until 1959. It had an effective ceiling of 45,000 feet. The high performance of QF 3.7 inch Mk 6 and QF 5.25 inch meant that QF 4.5 inch was not retained in land service after World War II.

== Surviving examples ==
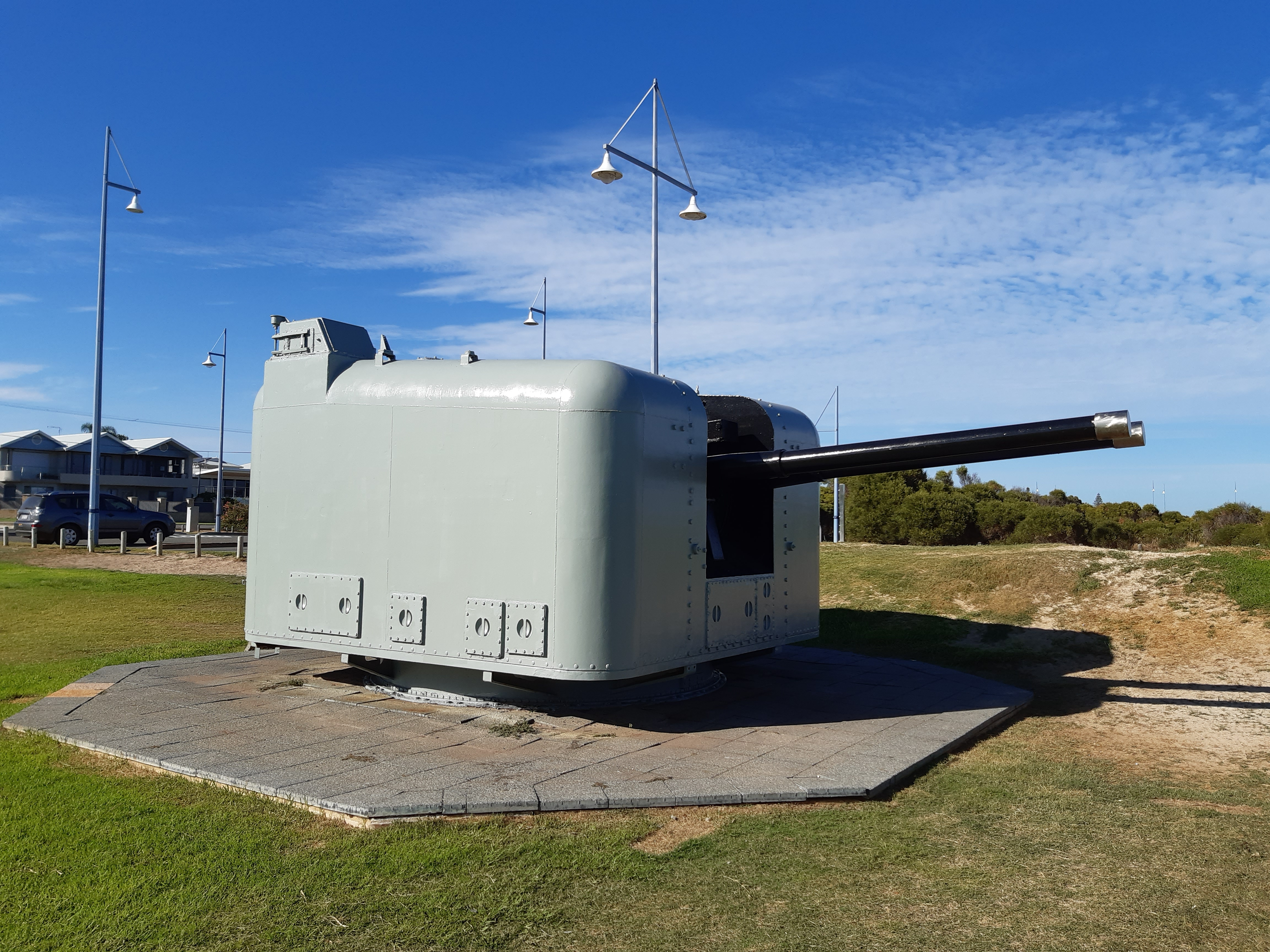
Twin Mark 6 guns in turret from Type 12/River class HMAS Derwent

Australia

- Twin Mk V/Mk 6 turrets on HMAS Vampire museum ship at Australian National Maritime Museum, Sydney, Australia.
- Twin Mk V/M6 6 turret from HMAS Parramatta on Spectacle Island, Sydney, Australia.
- Twin Mk V/Mk 6 turret from HMAS Stuart on display at HMAS Stirling, Garden Island (Western Australia).
- Twin Mk V/Mk 6 turret from HMAS Derwent at Rockingham Naval Memorial Park, Rockingham, Western Australia.
- Twin Mk V/Mk 6 turret from HMAS Swan at Princess Royal Fortress, Albany, Western Australia. This turret is open and accessible to visitors.
- Twin Mk V/Mk 6 turret from HMAS Torrens at Princess Royal Fortress, Albany, Western Australia.
- Twin Mk V/Mk 6 turret used as a static training aid outside the Gunnery School, HMAS Cerberus, Crib Point, Australia.
- Twin Mk V/Mk 6 turret as a gate guardian at the West Head Gunnery Range, Flinders, Australia. Previously used at the gunnery range as a live training aid, the gun was last fired in 2005.
- Twin Mk V/Mk 6 turret at the Bendigo and District RSL. Owned by the Australian Government, it is on loan from the nearby defence manufacturer Thales.
- Twin Mk V/Mk 6 turret at Australian Navy Cadets TS Bendigo at Passchendaele Barracks, Junortoun near Bendigo. As the previous location of TS Bendigo was on the Government Ordnance Factory site (now Thales Australia), it is probable it is also on loan from Thales.

Israel

- Single Mk IV/CP Mk V mounting from Z-class destroyer INS Yaffo, at Clandestine Immigration and Naval Museum, Haifa, Israel.

New Zealand

- Twin Mk V/Mk 6 turret from HMNZS Canterbury at Devonport Naval Base, Devonport.
- Twin Mk V/Mk 6 turret from HMNZS Taranaki at Te Papapa, Auckland.
- Twin MkV/Mk 6 turret from HMNZS Waikato off the coast near Tutukaka. The guns and turret were left in situ when the ship was decommissioned and sunk as a diving wreck.

United Kingdom

- Three Single Mk IV guns on Mk 5* Mod 1 mountings on Cavalier museum ship, at Chatham Historic Dockyard.
- One Single Mk IV gun on Mk 5* Mod 1 mounting alongside Cavalier museum ship, at Chatham Historic Dockyard.
- One Single Mk IV gun on Mk 5* Mod 2 mounting alongside Cavalier museum ship, at Chatham Historic Dockyard.
- Twin Mk V/Mk 6 turret at Explosion! Museum of Naval Firepower in Gosport, Hampshire.

== See also ==
- 4.5 inch Mark 8 naval gun The Royal Navy's current, but unrelated, 4.5 inch gun
- List of anti-aircraft guns
- List of naval guns by caliber

=== Weapons of comparable role, performance and era ===
- 5"/38 caliber gun : US Navy equivalent
- 12.8 cm FlaK 40 : German heavy anti-aircraft gun firing heavier shell

== Bibliography ==
- Campbell, John. 1985, Naval Weapons of World War Two. Annapolis, Md. : Naval Institute Press, c1985. ISBN 0-87021-459-4
- Tony DiGiulian, Page from Navweapons on Mk 2, 3, 4 and 5
- Tony DiGiulian, Page from Navweapons on Mk5, Mk 6 and Mk7
- Hogg, Ian V. 1998. "Allied Artillery of World War Two". The Crowood Press: London. ISBN 1-86126-165-9
- Hughes, Robert. 1975. Flagship to Murmansk. Futura: London. ISBN 0-86007-266-5
- Maurice-Jones, Colonel K. W. 1957. "The History of Coast Artillery in the British Army". Royal Artillery Institution: Woolwich. Reprinted by Naval & Military Press 2009.
- Routledge, Brigadier N. W. 1994. "History of the Royal Regiment of Artillery, Anti-Aircraft Artillery 1914–55". Brassey's: London. ISBN 1-85753-099-3
