= Aliyah Bet =

Illegal immigration by Jews to Mandatory Palestine in the 1930s and 1940s

Aliyah Bet (Hebrew: עלייה ב׳, "Aliyah 'B'" – bet being the second letter of the Hebrew alphabet) was the code name given to illegal immigration to Mandatory Palestine from 1920 to 1948 by Jews, mostly from Europe. In the 1930s and 1940s, many were refugees escaping from Nazi Germany or other Nazi-controlled countries. In the postwar years, they included Holocaust survivors. The later immigration to Palestine violated restrictions laid out in the British White Paper of 1939, but nonetheless the numbers dramatically increased between 1939 and 1948. With the establishment of the State of Israel in May 1948, Jewish displaced persons and refugees from Europe began streaming into the new state in the midst of the 1948 Palestine war.

In modern-day Israel, it has also been called by the Hebrew term Ha'apala (Hebrew: הַעְפָּלָה, "Ascension"). Those who underwent Ha'apala are known as Ma'apilim. The Aliyah Bet is distinguished from the Aliyah Aleph ("Aliyah 'A'", Aleph being the first letter of the Hebrew alphabet), which refers to the limited Jewish immigration permitted by British authorities during the same period. The name Aliya B is also shortened for Aliya Bilti Legalit (Hebrew: עלייה בלתי־לגאלית, lit. 'illegal immigration').

== Organization ==
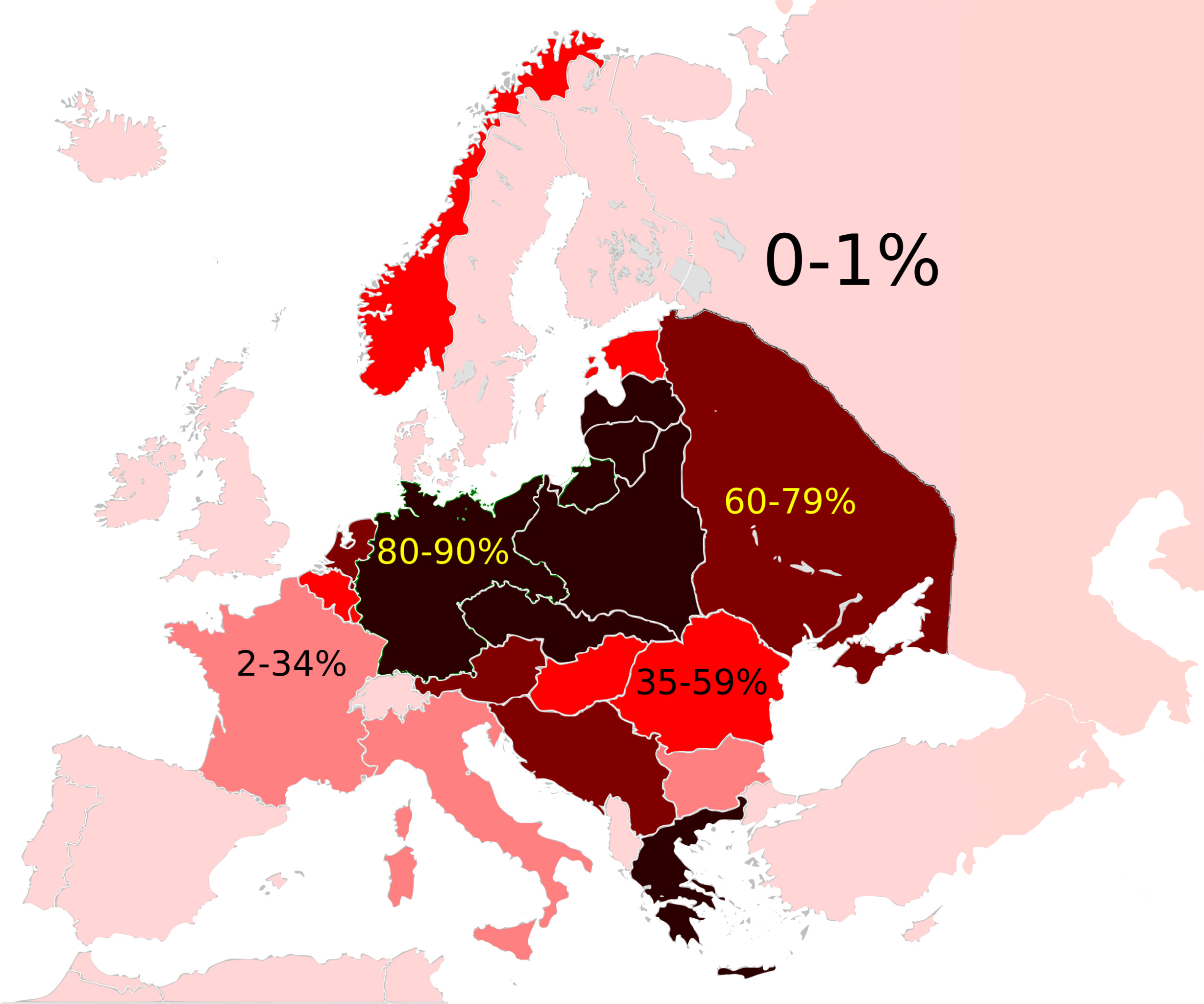
Holocaust death toll as a percentage of the total pre-war Jewish population in Europe

During Ha'apala, several emissaries from the Yishuv, Jewish partisans, the Jewish Brigade of the British Army, Zionist youth movements and organizations worked together to facilitate the immigration of Jews escaping from Nazi Germany to Mandatory Palestine beyond the established "White Paper" quotas. As the persecution of Jews dramatically intensified in German-occupied Europe during the Nazi era, the urgency driving the immigration also became more acute.

Ha'apala occurred in two phases. The first one, from 1934 to 1942, was an effort to enable European Jews to escape Nazi persecution and genocide. The second one, from 1945 to 1948, in a stage known as Bricha ("flight" or "escape"), was an effort to find homes for Jewish survivors of the Nazi crimes (Sh'erit ha-Pletah, "Surviving Remnant") who were among the millions of displaced persons ("DPs") languishing in refugee camps scattered across post-war Europe, primarily located in Allied-occupied Germany and Austria, and Italy."

During the first phase, several Zionist organizations (including Revisionists) led the effort; after World War II, the Mossad LeAliyah Bet ("the Institute for Aliyah B"), an arm of the Haganah, took charge. The Palyam, a maritime branch of the Palmach, was given responsibility for commanding and sailing ships from Europe to Mandatory Palestine.

== Routes ==
Post-World War II, Ha'apala journeys typically started in the DP camps and moved through one of two collection points in the American occupation sector, Bad Reichenhall and Leipheim. From there, the refugees travelled in disguised trucks, on foot, or by train to ports on the Mediterranean Sea, where ships brought them to Palestine. Most of the ships had names such as Lo Tafchidunu ("You can't frighten us") and La-Nitzahon ("To the victory") designed to inspire and rally the Jews of Palestine. Some were named after prominent figures in the Zionist movement, and people who had been killed while supporting Aliyah Bet. More than 70,000 Jews arrived in Palestine on more than 100 ships.

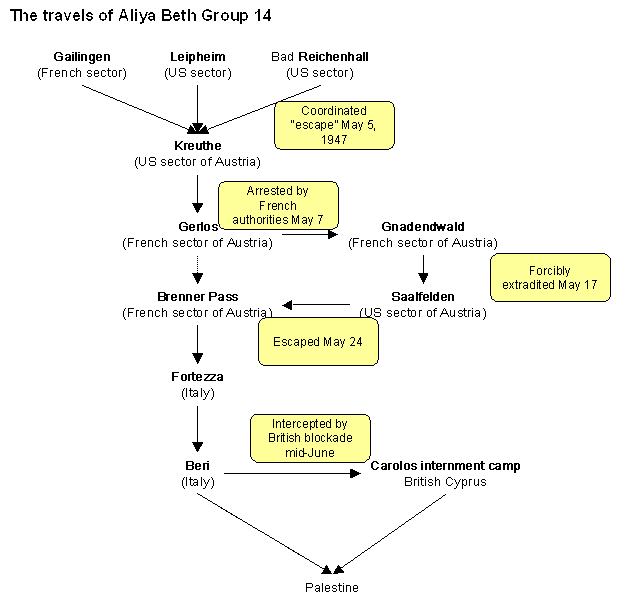
The journey of Aliyah Bet Group 14

American sector camps imposed no restrictions on the movements out of the camps, and American, French, and Italian officials often turned a blind eye to the movements. Several UNRRA officials (in particular Elizabeth Robertson in Leipheim) acted as facilitators of the emigration. The British government vehemently opposed the movement, and restricted movement in and out of their camps. The British set up naval patrols to prevent immigrants from landing in Palestine.

== History ==
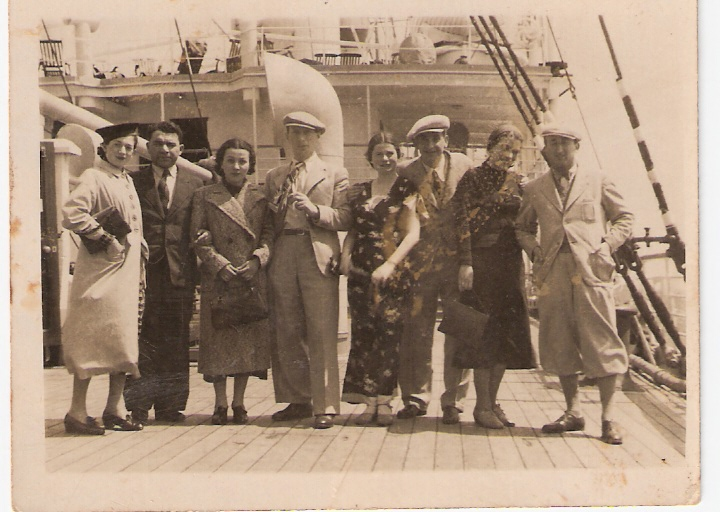
Olim from Poland aboard the SS Polonia, c. 1937

Over 100,000 people attempted to illegally enter Mandatory Palestine. There were 142 voyages by 120 ships. Over half were stopped by the British patrols. The Royal Navy had eight ships on station in Palestine, and additional ships were tasked with tracking suspicious vessels heading for Palestine. Most of the intercepted immigrants were sent to internment camps in Cyprus: (Karaolos near Famagusta, Nicosia, Dhekelia, and Xylotymbou. Some were sent to the Atlit detention camp in Palestine, and some to Mauritius. The British held as many as 50,000 people in these camps (see Jews in British camps on Cyprus). Over 1,600 drowned at sea. Only a few thousand actually entered Palestine.

The pivotal event in Ha'apala program was the Exodus incident in 1947. Exodus was intercepted and boarded by a Royal Navy patrol. Despite significant resistance, passengers from Exodus were forcibly returned to Europe, and eventually put in camps in Germany. This was publicized, to the great embarrassment of the British government.

One account of Aliyah Bet is given by journalist I. F. Stone in his 1946 book Underground to Palestine, a first-person account of traveling from Europe with displaced persons attempting to reach the Jewish homeland.

More than 300 volunteers, most of them American World War II veterans, including Murray Greenfield (of the ship HaTikva), volunteered to sail ten ships ("The Jews' Secret Fleet") from the United States to Europe to load 35,000 survivors of the Holocaust (half of the illegal immigrants to Palestine), only to be deported to detention camps on Cyprus.

== Timeline ==
=== Before World War II ===
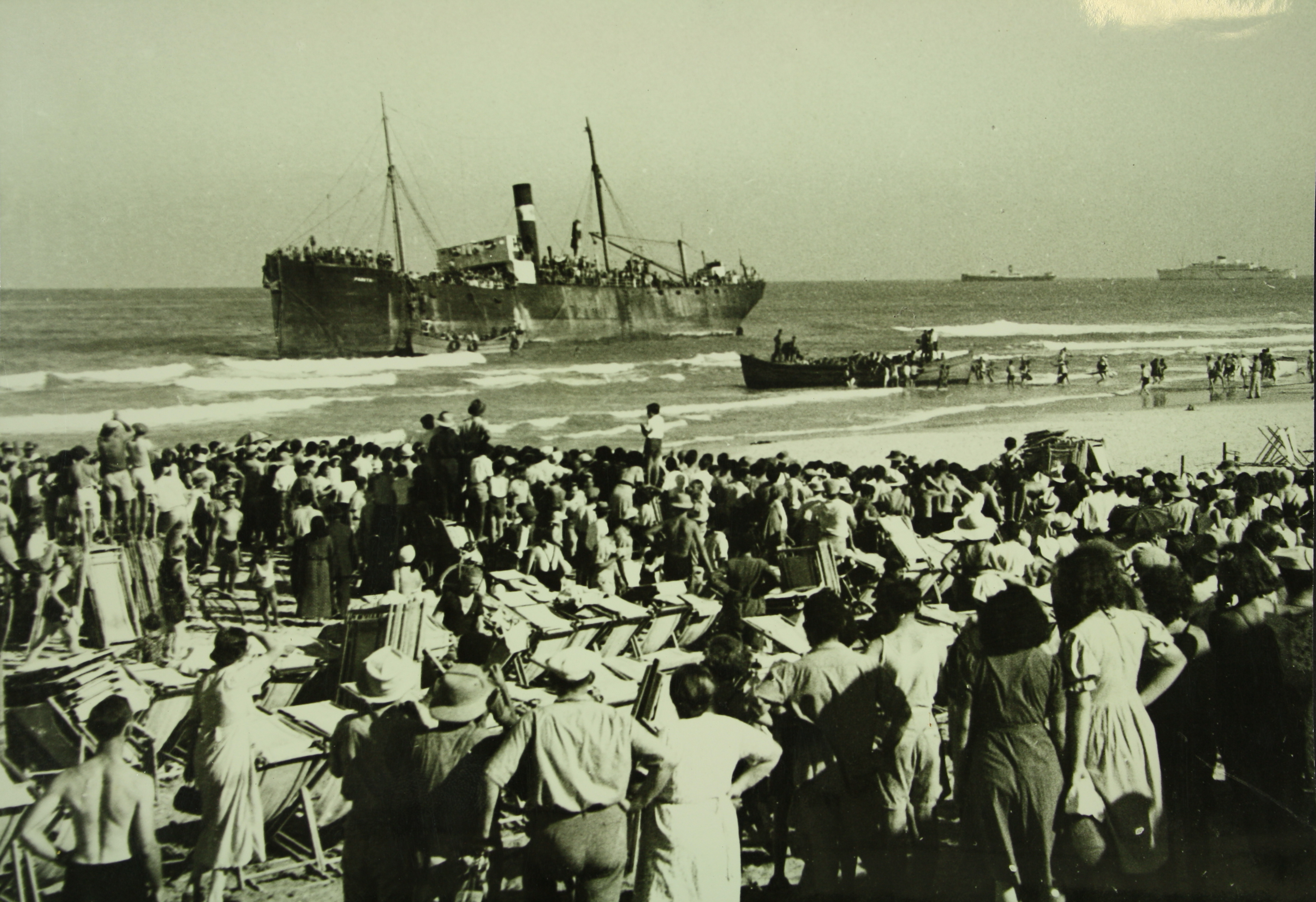
SS Parita aground off Tel Aviv, August 1939

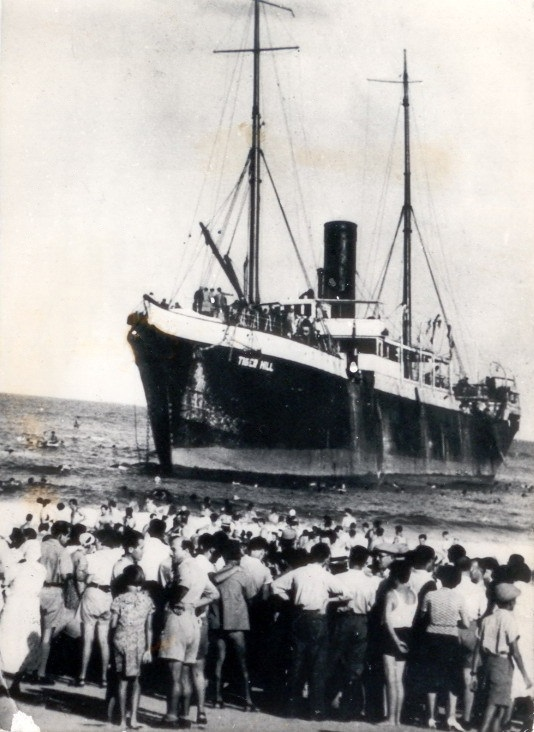
SS Tiger Hill aground off Haifa, September 1, 1939

- In 1934, the first attempt to bring in a large number of illegal immigrants by sea happened when some 350 Jews sailed on the Vallos, a chartered ship, without the permission of the Jewish Agency, who feared illegal immigration would cause the British to restrict legal immigration. She arrived off the coast of Palestine on 25 August, and the passengers disembarked with the help of the Haganah, which received special permission to assist them.
- On 29 July 1939, the Colorado, flying under the Panamanian flag and carrying 378 Jewish refugees from Europe was intercepted by the British; the illegal immigrants were arrested and taken into Haifa.
- On 19 August, the Aghios Nicolaus, a Greek owned ship, transferred 840 immigrants to smaller vessels off the coast and sent them to shore.
- On 23 August, the Parita, carrying some 700 refugees on board, was deliberately beached at Tel Aviv by the passengers, the captain and crew having fled in a small boat.

=== During World War II ===
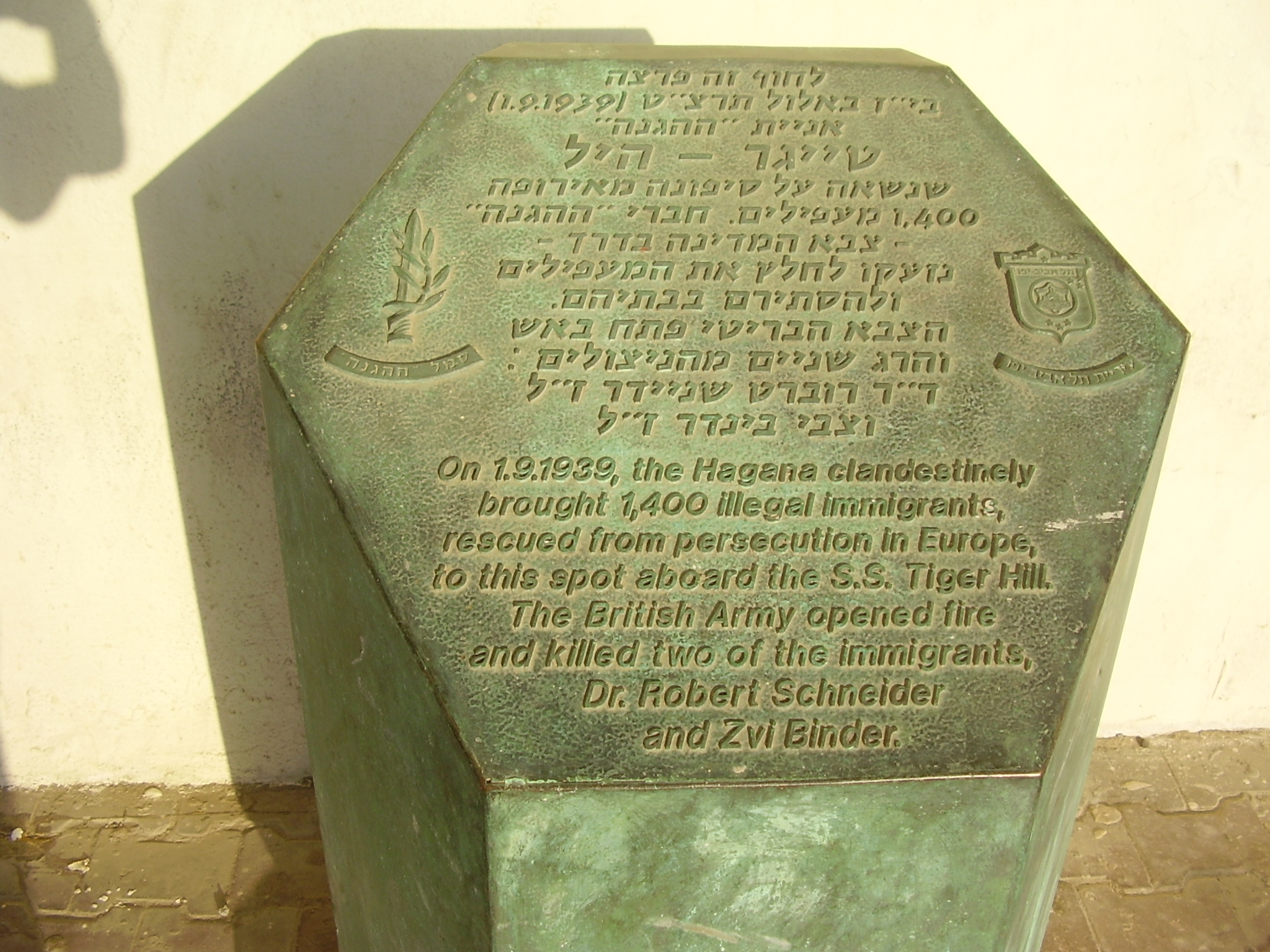
Tiger Hill Memorial at Frishman Beach

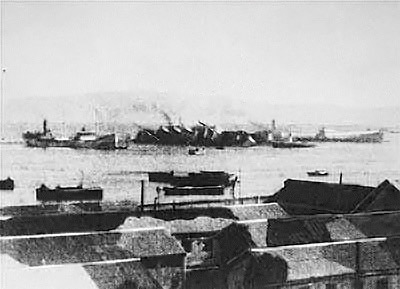
SS Patria sinking in Haifa port

- On 2 September, the Tiger Hill, a 1,499-ton ship built in 1887, was intercepted and fired on by Royal Navy gunboats off Tel Aviv, killing two passengers (Dr Robert Schneider and Zvi Binder); the ship HMCS Belleville beached on the shore with 1,205 immigrants on board; the Tiger Hill had sailed from Constanţa, Romania, on 3 August 1939, with about 750 immigrants on board and had taken on board the passengers from the Frossoula, another illegal immigrant ship that was marooned in Lebanon.
- On 16 September, the Rudnitchan transferred 364 Jewish refugees into five lifeboats outside the territorial waters of the Mandate and sent them ashore as illegal immigrants.
- On 19 September, the Noemi Julia, sailing from Sulina in Romania with 1,130 Jewish refugees from Europe on board was intercepted in the Mediterranean by a British warship and forced to Haifa port; fearing that they would be sent back, the illegal immigrants engaged in passive resistance; the British authorities brought them ashore and held them in a detention camp; they were released a month later.
- On 24–25 November 1939, a large group of immigrants traveled by train from Vienna to Bratislava and about 2 weeks later sailed from there on the riverboat Uranus down the Danube. At the Romanian border, the three smaller riverboats to which they had been transferred on December 14 on entering Yugoslavia were intercepted and the immigrants were forced to disembark at the old fortress town of Kladovo. About 1,100 refugees were stranded there and came to be known as the Kladovo-Sabac Group. In May 1941, they were still in Yugoslavia, where 915 of them were caught and eventually killed by the invading Nazis. The 800 men were shot by Nazi soldiers in a farmer's field at Zasavica; after the war, the remains of the men were re-interred in a mass grave in the Belgrade Sephardi Cemetery. The women and children were imprisoned in the Sajmiste concentration camp where they perished from hunger, disease, exposure to the bitter cold winter weather, or gassed to death in a mobile gas truck.
- On 18 May 1940 the old Italian paddle steamer Pencho sailed from Bratislava, with 514 passengers, mostly Betar members. The Pencho sailed down the Danube to the Black Sea and into the Aegean Sea. On 9 October, her engines failed and she was wrecked off Mytilene, in the Italian-ruled Dodecanese Islands. The Italians rescued the passengers and took them to Rhodes. All but two were then placed in an internment camp at Ferramonti di Tarsia in southern Italy. They were held there until Allied forces liberated the area in September 1943.
- In October 1940, a large group of refugees were allowed to leave Vienna. The exodus was organized by Berthold Storfer, a Jewish businessman who worked under Adolf Eichmann. They took four river boats, Uranus, Schönbrunn, Helios, and Melk, down the Danube to Romania, where the Uranus passengers, about 1,000, boarded the Pacific, and sailed on 11 October 1940. They arrived at Haifa on 1 November, followed by the Milos a few days later. The British transferred all the immigrants to the French liner SS Patria to take them for internment to Mauritius. To stop the Patria from sailing, the Haganah smuggled a bomb aboard. The explosion holed her side, capsizing her and killing around 260 people. The British, by order of Winston Churchill, allowed the survivors to remain in Palestine.
- In December 1940 the Salvador, a small Bulgarian schooner formerly named Tsar Krum, left Burgas with 327 refugees. On December 12 the Salvador was wrecked in a violent storm in the Sea of Marmara, near Istanbul. 223 persons, including 66 children, lost their lives. The survivors were taken to Istanbul. 125 survivors were deported back to Bulgaria, and the remaining 70 left on the Darien (No. 66).
- On 11 December 1941, the Struma sailed from Constanţa carrying between 760 and 790 refugees. Three days later she reached Istanbul, where Turkey detained her and her passengers for 10 weeks. On 23 February 1942, Turkish authorities towed her back into the Black Sea and cast her adrift. Early the next day the Shch-213 torpedoed and sank her. Between 767 and 791 people were killed, and there was only one survivor.
- On 20 September 1942, the Europa sailed from Romania with 21 passengers. She was wrecked in the Bosphorus.
- On 21 April 1944, the Belasitza sailed from Romania with 273 passengers including 120 children, who went from Istanbul to Palestine by sealed train.
- On 5 August 1944, Bulbul, Mefküre and Morino sailed from Constanţa carrying about 1,000 refugees between them. In the night the Soviet submarine Shch-215 sank Mefküre by torpedo and shellfire, and then machine-gunned survivors in the water. Between 289 and 394 refugees plus seven crew were aboard Mefküre; only the crew and five refugees survived. Bulbul rescued the few survivors and took them to Turkey.

=== After VE Day ===
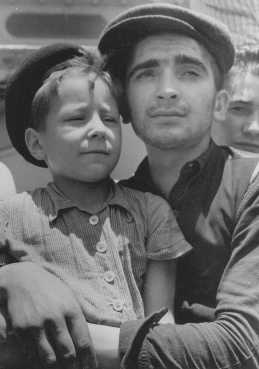
Yisrael Meir Lau (aged 8) and Elazar Schiff, survivors of Buchenwald concentration camp, arrive at Haifa, July 1945

- On 28 August 1945 the Italian fishing vessel Dalin, made in Monopoli, carrying 35 immigrants, landed at Caesarea Maritima, disembarked its passengers, and returned to Italy.
- On 4 September 1945, the Natan, carrying 79 immigrants, landed in Palestine, carrying seamen and radio operators from the Palmach and Jewish Agency emissaries on the return trip to Italy. On October 1, 1945, the Natan again ran the blockade arrived at Shefayim with 73 immigrants.
- On 9 September 1945, the Gabriela, carrying 40 passengers, arrived undetected in Palestine.
- On 17 September 1945, the Peter, carrying 168 immigrants, landed in Palestine undetected by the British. She again slipped into Palestine undetected and arrived at Shefayim on 22 October, this time carrying 174 passengers.
- On 23 November 1945, the Berl Katznelson, carrying 220 Jewish refugees, arrived in Shefayim. As the ship was landing immigrants she was intercepted by the Royal Navy sloop HMS Peacock. Of the passengers, 200 reached the beach and escaped, and 20 were arrested.
- On 14 December 1945, the ship Hannah Senesh, carrying 252 passengers, was beached at Nahariya in Palestine after evading Royal Navy patrols. The passengers were brought ashore via a rope bridge, and evaded capture.
- On 17 January 1946, the Enzo Sereni, carrying 908 passengers, was intercepted by the destroyer HMS Talybont and escorted to Haifa.
- On 25 March 1946 the schooner Wingate, carrying 248 passengers, ran the blockade and attempted to land. The Imperial British Palestine Police Force opened fire from the shore, killing Bracha Fuld, a female Palmach member. The ship was captured and escorted to Haifa by the destroyer HMS Chevron.
- On 27 March 1946 the steamer Tel Hai, carrying 736 passengers, was intercepted by the destroyer HMS Chequers 140 miles out at sea as it approached Palestine.
- On 13 May 1946, the Max Nordau, carrying 1,754 immigrants, was captured by the destroyers HMS Jervis and HMS Chequers. The same day, the ships Dov Hos (675 passengers) and Eliahu Golomb (735 passengers) arrived in Palestine legally. The British had blockaded the Dov Hos after it had arrived in La Spezia, but the passengers responded with a hunger strike and a threat to blow her up, compelling the British to give them entry permits.
- On 8 June 1946, the Haviva Reik, carrying 462 passengers, was intercepted by HMS Saumarez on 8 June 1946. Some 150 people had previously transferred from the Haviva Reik to the Rafi off the Palestinian coast, and the crew had disembarked.
- On 26 June 1946, the Josiah Wedgwood, carrying 1,259 passengers, was intercepted by HMS Venus. The passengers were sent to the Atlit detainee camp.
- On 20 July 1946, the Haganah, carrying 2,678 passengers, departed from France, and transferred 1,108 of its passengers to the small steamer Biriah west of Crete. The Biriah was intercepted by HMS Virago on 2 July. The Haganah picked up a new party of refugees at Bakar, Yugoslavia, and set sail for Palestine, this time also carrying 2,678 passengers total. She was found at sea with engines broken down and no electrical power, and was towed to Haifa by HMS Venus. Her passengers were arrested and interned.
- On 11 August 1946, the Yagur, carrying 758 passengers, was intercepted by the destroyer HMS Brissenden, with passive resistance from the immigrants.
- On 12 August 1946, the Henrietta Szold, carrying 536 passengers, was intercepted. The same day, the British announced that illegal immigrants would be sent to Cyprus and other areas under detention. The first British deportation ship sailed for Cyprus on the same day, with 500 illegal immigrants on board.
- On 13 August 1946, two immigration ships were intercepted: Katriel Jaffe (604 passengers) by HMS Talybont, and Twenty Three (790 passengers) by HMS Brissenden. There was desperate resistance on board Twenty Three. The same day, two British ships with 1,300 Jewish detainees on board set sail for Cyprus. A crowd of about 1,000 Jews attempted to break into the Haifa port area, and British troops responded with live fire, killing three people and wounding seven.
- On 16 August 1946, the yawl Amiram Shochat, carrying 183 passengers, evaded the British blockade and landed near Caesarea Maritima.
- On 2 September 1946, the Dov Hos, this time named the Arba Cheruyot, carrying 1,024 passengers, was seized by the destroyers HMS Childers and HMS Chivalrous. The boarding was strongly resisted, and two people drowned after jumping off the ship.
- On 22 September 1946, the brigantine Palmach, 611 passengers, was seized by the minesweeper HMS Rowena. The Royal Navy tried to board the ship four times before finally seizing her, and one passenger was killed.
- On 20 October 1946, the Eliahu Golomb, renamed the Braha Fuld, carrying 806 passengers, was captured off Lebanon by the destroyer HMS Chaplet and minesweeper HMS Moon.
- On 19 October, the Latrun (1,279 passengers), was intercepted by HMS Chivalrous and the minesweeper HMS Octavia. Four people had died en route, and the ship was leaking and listing heavily when she was intercepted.
- On 9 November 1946, the HaKedosha (600 passengers), foundered in a gale and sank. The passengers were rescued by the Knesset Israel. The Knesset Israel, carrying a total of 3,845 passengers, was intercepted by the destroyers HMS Haydon and HMS Brissenden and minesweepers HMS Octavia and HMS Espiegle and taken to Haifa. The interception met no resistance, but in Haifa when the British tried to transfer them to transport ships to take them to Cyprus the refugees resisted fiercely, two were killed and 46 injured.
- On 5 December 1946, the Rafiah (785 passengers), was wrecked on Syrina Island in bad weather. The survivors were rescued by two Royal Navy and one Greek warship, and were taken to Cyprus. Women and children were taken to Palestine.
- On 9 February 1947, the wooden brigantine Lanegev (647 passengers) was captured by HMS Chieftain after a battle which left one refugee dead.

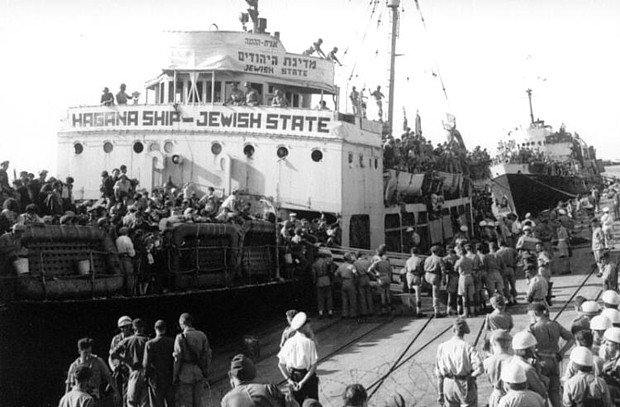
Haganah ship Medinat HaYehudim ("Jewish State") in Haifa port, 1947

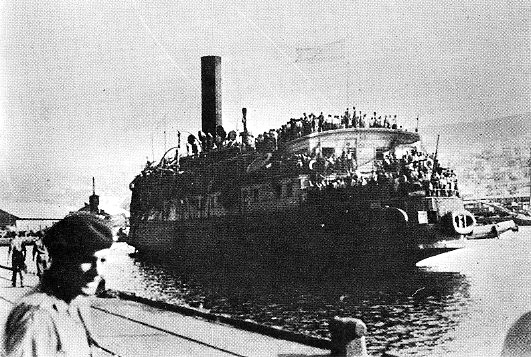
SS Exodus arriving at Haifa port, 20 July 1947

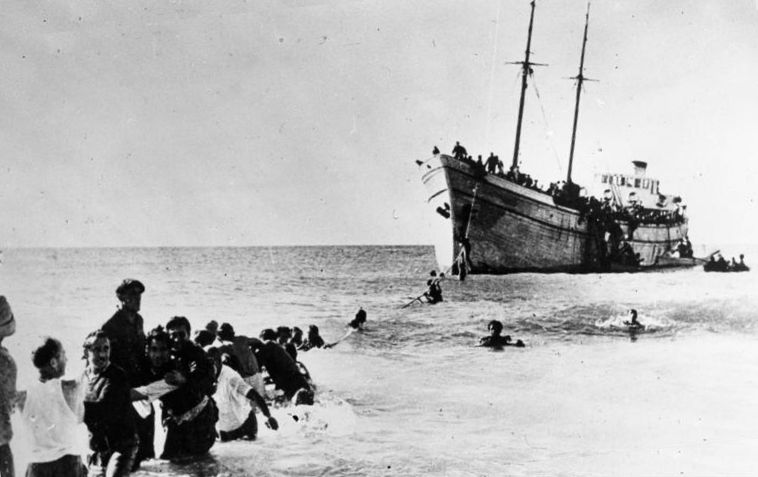
United States lands Jewish refugees in Nahariya, 1948

- On 17 February 1947, the steamer HaMapil HaAlmoni (807 passengers) was intercepted by HMS St Austell Bay, captured after a violent battle, and taken in tow by the minesweeper HMS Welfare.
- On 27 February 1947, the Haim Arlosoroff, after the name of an assassinated leader of the Jewish Agency (1,378 passengers) was intercepted by Royal Navy destroyer HMS Chieftain, and the passengers put up fierce resistance. The ship ran aground at Bat Galim, south of Haifa, just opposite a British Army camp. The passengers were arrested and deported to Cyprus.
- On 9 March 1947, the Ben Hecht (597 passengers), the only ship sponsored by the Irgun, was captured without resistance by the destroyers HMS Chieftain, HMS Chevron and HMS Chivalrous.
- On 12 March 1947, the Shabtai Luzinsky (823 passengers) ran the blockade and beached itself north of Gaza City, where the passengers disembarked, and most escaped a British Army cordon. Hundreds of local residents came down to the beach to mingle with passengers who evaded arrest. Many residents were mistaken for refugees, arrested, and sent to Cyprus, with some 460 locals returned home the following week.
- On 30 March 1947, the Moledet (1,588 passengers) developed a list and suffered engine failure some 50 miles outside Palestinian waters and issued an SOS. Passengers were transferred to the destroyers HMS Haydon and HMS Charity, minesweeper HMS Octavia and frigate HMS St Brides Bay, and the Royal Navy towed Moledet to Haifa.
- On 13 April 1947, the Theodor Herzl (2,641 passengers) was intercepted by HMS Haydon and HMS St Brides Bay. Passengers resisted heavily; three were killed and 27 were injured.
- On 23 April 1947, the Shear Yashuv (768 passengers) was intercepted by destroyer HMS Cheviot.
- On 17 May 1947, the Hatikva (1,414 passengers) was intercepted, rammed and captured by the destroyers HMS Venus and HMS Brissenden.
- On 23 May 1947, the immigrant ship Mordei Hagetaot, carrying 1,457 immigrants, was intercepted and boarded by the Royal Navy off southern Palestine. All of its passengers were arrested.
- On 31 May 1947, the Haganah ship Yehuda Halevy, carrying 399 immigrants, arrived in Palestine under escort after being intercepted by the Royal Navy. The immigrants were immediately transferred to Cyprus.
- On 18 July 1947, the ship SS Exodus, carrying 4,515 immigrants, was intercepted by the cruiser HMS Ajax and a flotilla of destroyers. She was rammed and boarded but the immigrants resisted the boarding, and had put up barriers and barbed wire to impede boarding. Two passengers and a crewman were bludgeoned to death, several dozen were injured, and the ship was taken over. The Exodus was towed to Haifa, where the immigrants were forced onto three deportation ships and taken to France. When the deportation ships docked in Port-de-Bouc, the passengers refused to disembark after the French government announced that it would only allow the immigrants off the ships if they consented. The immigrants were then taken to Germany, forcibly taken off the ships, and sent back to DP camps.
- On 28 July 1947, the 14 Halalei Gesher Haziv, carrying 685 Eastern European Jews was intercepted by HMS Rowena. The Shivat Zion, carrying 411 North African Jews, was intercepted without resistance by the minesweeper. HMS Providence.
- On 27 September 1947, the Af Al Pi Chen (434 passengers), was intercepted by HMS Talybont and taken after violent resistance. One person was killed and ten were injured.
- On 2 October 1947, the Medinat HaYehudim (2,664 passengers) was intercepted by the Royal Navy. The same day, the Geulah, with 1,385 passengers, was intercepted by HMS Chaplet.
- On 15 November 1947, the Peter, renamed the Aliyah and carrying 182 passengers, ran the British blockade and beached near Netanya. The passengers, all specially-picked youths, quickly disembarked and escaped.
- On 16 November 1947, the Kadima, a larger ship carrying 794 immigrants, was intercepted by the Royal Navy and brought to Haifa, where its passengers were transferred to the British transport ship HMT Runnymede Park and taken to Cyprus.

=== After the UN Partition Resolution ===
Film about Ha'apala after World War II

- On 4 December 1947, the HaPortzim ran the blockade and landed its 167 passengers at the mouth of the Yarkon River.
- On 22 December 1947, the Lo Tafchidunu (884 passengers) was intercepted by HMS Verulam and taken in tow by the sloop HMS Mermaid.
- On 28 December 1947, the 29 BeNovember (680 passengers) was intercepted by HMS Chevron.
- On 1 January 1948, the HaUmot HaMeuhadot (537 passengers) ran the blockade and beached herself at Nahariya. 131 passengers were caught, the rest evaded arrest. The same day, the Atzma'ut (7,612 passengers) and the Kibbutz Galuyot (7,557 passengers) were intercepted by the cruisers HMS Mauritius and HMS Phoebe and taken to Cyprus.
- On 31 January 1948, the 35 Giborei Kfar Etzion (280 passengers) was intercepted by HMS Childers.
- On 12 February 1948, the Yerushalayim Hanezura (679 passengers) was intercepted by HMS Cheviot.
- On 20 February 1948, the Lekommemiyut (696 passengers) was intercepted by HMS Childers.
- On 28 February 1948, the Bonim v'Lochamim formerly the Enzo Sereni, (982 passengers) was intercepted off Cape Carmel by HMS Venus .
- On 29 March 1948, the Yehiam (771 passengers) was intercepted by the destroyer HMS Verulam.
- On 12 April 1948, the Tirat Zvi (817 passengers) was intercepted by HMS Virago.
- On 24 April 1948, the Mishmar HaEmek (782 passengers) was intercepted by HMS Chevron off Haifa.
- On 26 April 1948, the Nakhson (553 passengers) was intercepted off Haifa by the sloop HMS Pelican after fierce resistance which left a number of people injured.

== Conclusion ==
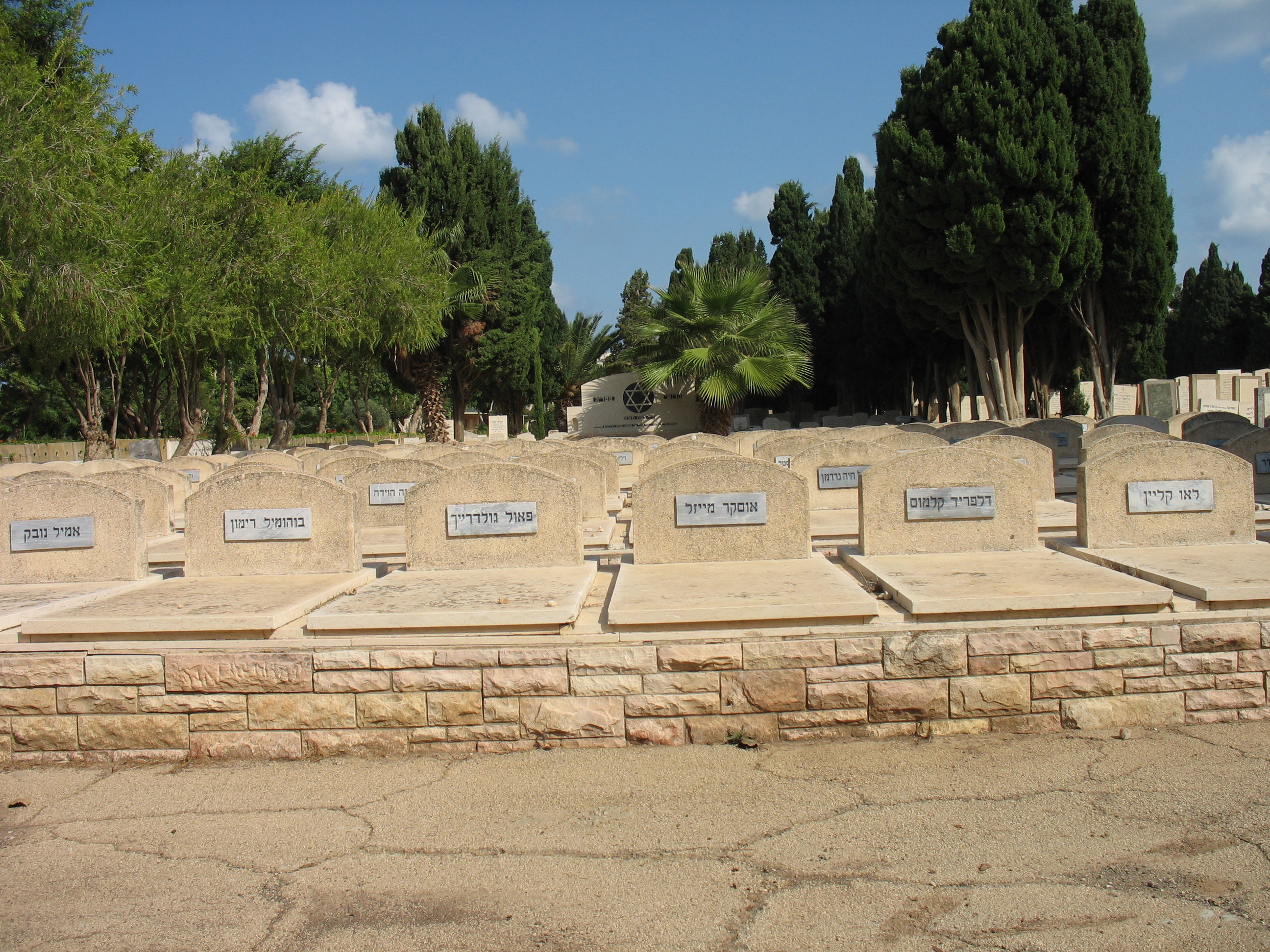
Graves of some of the victims of the SS Patria sinking

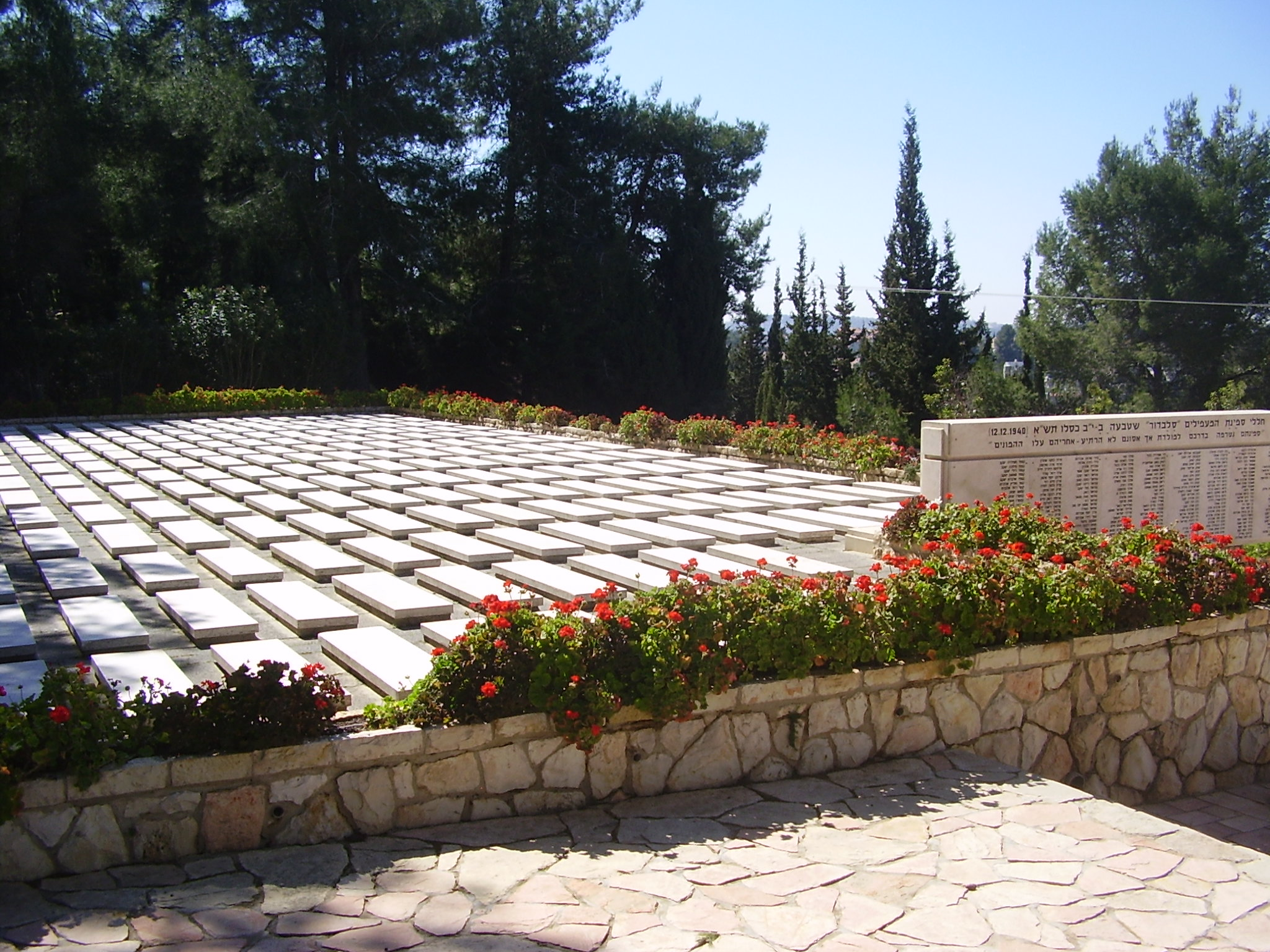
Graves of the 223 Jewish passengers of Salvador who drowned during a storm at sea in 1940, Mount Herzl, Jerusalem.

The success of Aliyah Bet was modest when measured in terms of the numbers who succeeded in entering Palestine. However, it proved to be a unifying force both for the Jewish community in Palestine (the Yishuv) and for the Holocaust-survivor refugees in Europe (Sh'erit ha-Pletah).

The immigrants who drowned in the sea and whose bodies were found were buried in the National Cemetery in Mount Herzl in Jerusalem.

== See also ==
- Jewish exodus from Arab and Muslim countries
- Jewish Agency for Israel
- Yom HaAliyah
- Charles Thau
