= HMS Chevron =

C-class destroyer

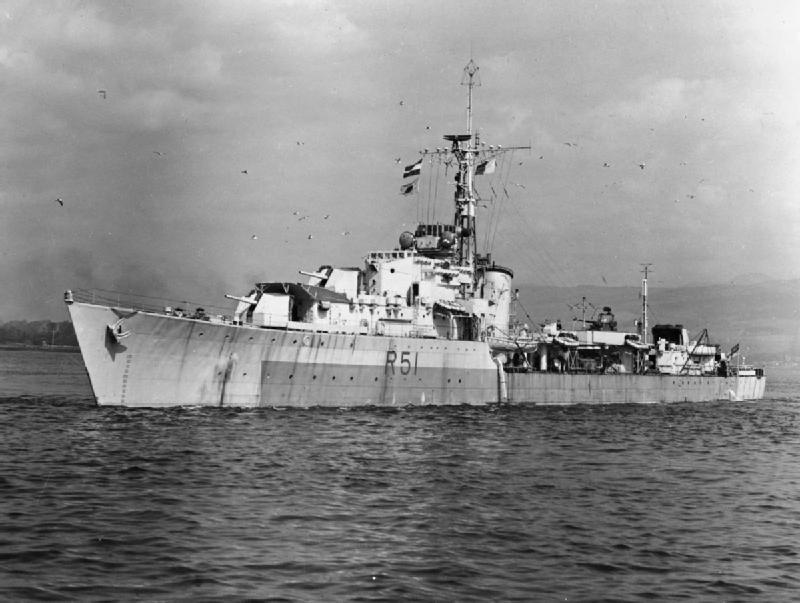
- HMS Chevron on the River Clyde, 18 May 1945

History

United Kingdom
- Name: HMS Chevron
- Ordered: 24 July 1942
- Builder: Alexander Stephen and Sons Limited, (Glasgow, Scotland)
- Yard number: 599
- Laid down: 18 March 1943
- Launched: 23 February 1944
- Commissioned: 23 August 1945
- Identification: Pennant number: R51
- Fate: Scrapped at Inverkeithing in December 1969

General characteristics
- Class & type: C-class destroyer
- Displacement: 1,900 long tons (1,930 t) standard; 2,535 long tons (2,576 t) full load
- Length: 362 ft 9 in (110.57 m) o/a; 339 ft 6 in (103.48 m) pp
- Beam: 35 ft 9 in (10.90 m)
- Draught: 10 ft 6 in (3.20 m)
- Propulsion: 2 Admiralty 3-drum boilers, Parsons single-reduction geared steam turbines, 40,000 shp (30 MW), 2 shafts
- Speed: 36 kn (67 km/h; 41 mph); 32 kn (59 km/h; 37 mph) (full load)
- Range: 4,675 nautical miles (8,658 km; 5,380 mi) at 20 knots (37 km/h; 23 mph); 1,400 nautical miles (2,600 km; 1,600 mi) at 32 knots (59 km/h; 37 mph)
- Complement: 186
- Armament: 4 × QF 4.5 in (5 in) L/45 guns on mounts CP Mk.V; 2 × Bofors 40 mm L/60 guns on twin mount "Hazemeyer" Mk.IV; 2 × single 2-pdr Mk VIII; 2 × 20 mm Oerlikon cannon; 8 (2 × 4) tubes for 21 in (533 mm) torpedoes Mk.IX; 80 depth charges

HMS Chevron was a C-class destroyer of the Royal Navy that was in service from August 1945 to the 1960s. She was scrapped in 1969.

== Construction ==
The Royal Navy ordered Chevron on 24 July 1942, one of eight Ch-class "Intermediate" destroyers of the 1942 Programme. She was laid down at Alexander Stephen and Sons, Limited, Glasgow, Scotland, on 18 March 1943, and launched 23 February 1944. She was commissioned on 23 August 1945, too late for World War II. The yard also built her sister ship, Cheviot.

== Service ==
After the War Chevron was allocated the pennant number D51. On 9 December 1946, as part of the 'Palestine Patrol', tasked with intercepting illegal Jewish immigration to Mandatory Palestine, Chevron and the minesweeper Providence arrived at the small island of Syrna in the Dodecanese group of Greek islands, to rescue survivors of the coal-fired, ~650 gross tonne Athina Rafiah, carrying Jewish immigrants, which had wrecked on 7 December in Agiou Soassin Bay, on the south coast, while seeking shelter in heavy weather. Most of the approximately 800 Ma'apilim on board had struggled onto the island, some with injuries. "After dark, in heavy rain and a rough sea, they carried out the rescue operation and transported the miserable passengers to a landing ship tank (LST) near the island of Crete. Like thousands of Ma'apilim before them on board nine ships that sailed during the summer of 1946, the Ma'apilim were transported to detention camps in Cyprus."

On 6 February 1952, the U.S. Navy Martin P4M-1Q Mercator, BuNo 124371, based in Port Lyautey, French Morocco, staging out of Nicosia, Cyprus, returning from an electronic reconnaissance mission over the Black Sea, made an open ocean dead-stick landing east of Cyprus. Of 15 crew aboard, 14 were rescued by Chevron, the aircraft commander being lost following the ditching.

On 31 October 1954, the aircraft carrier Triumph and Chevron were open to Malta visitors in the afternoon. Triumph was berthed in Grand Harbour and Chevron in Sliema Creek.

== Decommissioning and reserve ==
In 1954 Chevron returned to Portsmouth from the Mediterranean and decommissioned. In 1956 she was briefly recommissioned and served as part of the 1st Destroyer Squadron in Operation Musketeer during the Suez Crisis. From 1957 until 1969 she served in reserve as an accommodation ship at Rosyth. Jane's Fighting Ships 1962-1963 states that "Chequers and Chevron are for disposal in the near future." She was placed on the disposal list in 1964.

Chevron was sold to Thos. W. Ward for scrapping at Inverkeithing in December 1969. Her bell is preserved at Collingwood Area School, New Zealand.

== Publications ==
- Colledge, J. J.; Warlow, Ben (2006) [1969]. Ships of the Royal Navy: The Complete Record of All Fighting Ships of the Royal Navy from the 15th Century to the Present (3rd Rev ed.). London: Chatham Publishing. ISBN 978-1-86176-281-8. OCLC 67375475.
- Gardiner, Robert; Chesneau, Roger, eds. (1980). Conway's All The World's Fighting Ships 1922–1946. London: Conway Maritime Press. ISBN 0-85177-146-7.
- Gardiner, Robert; Chumbley, Stephen, eds. (1995). Conway's All The World's Fighting Ships 1947–1995. Annapolis, Maryland, USA: Naval Institute Press. ISBN 1-55750-132-7.
- Marriott, Leo (1989). Royal Navy Destroyers Since 1945. Ian Allan Ltd. ISBN 0-7110-1817-0.
