= Gefen Publishing House =

- Founder: Murray and Hana Greenfield
- Country of origin: Israel
- Headquarters location: Jerusalem
- Distribution: Israel, United States
- Key people: Ilan Greenfield, CEO
- Publication types: Books
- Nonfiction topics: English-language books of Jewish and Israeli interest
- Official website: www.gefenpublishing.com

Gefen Publishing House (Hebrew: הוצאת גפן) is an English language book publisher in Jerusalem, which also has a department in New York City.

== History ==
Gefen was founded in 1981 by Murray and Hana Greenfield. Its CEO is Ilan Greenfield, son of the founders.

The firm publishes approximately 40 titles per year. It specializes in English-language books of Jewish and Israeli interest. Their publications cover a wide variety of Israeli and Jewish subjects.
