= Murray Greenfield =

Israeli writer (1926–2024)

- מוריי גרינפילד
- Born: September 11, 1926; New York City, U.S.
- Died: September 23, 2024 (aged 98)

Murray S. Greenfield (Hebrew: מוריי גרינפילד; September 11, 1926 – September 23, 2024) was an American-born Israeli writer and publisher.

== Biography ==
Murray Greenfield was born and raised in New York City on September 11, 1926. During World War II, he served in the United States Merchant Marine. Following the war, he was a volunteer crewman on the Aliyah Bet ship Hatikva to transport Holocaust survivors to Mandatory Palestine and was imprisoned by the British on Cyprus before settling in Israel.

Greenfield settled in Haifa, seeking foreign investors to deposit capital in the Palestinian Economic Cooperation. In the early days of Israel’s independence, most philanthropists only thought of donating charity to poverty-stricken immigrants.

Greenfield later moved to Tel Aviv with his bride, Hana Lustigova. He was one of the founding members of the Association of Americans and Canadians in Israel (AACI), wherein he later served as executive director. Under his directorship, the AACI flourished; Greenfield pioneered and established loan funds, a mortgage company, and a variety of housing projects in Jerusalem, Tel Aviv, and kibbutzim.

Greenfield was always involved in public service, but the cause to which he dedicated the most time was rescuing Ethiopian Jewry; he was volunteer director for seven years of the American Association for Ethiopian Jewry (AAEJ).

In 1981, Greenfield founded Gefen Publishing House, later taken over by his sons, Dror and Ilan. After Dror’s death in 2003, Ilan continued to run the company. Today, Gefen publishes up to 35 titles a year and is the main English language publisher in Israel.

Hana and Murray Greenfield had three children. Hana Greenfield died in January 2014. Murray Greenfield died on September 23, 2024, at the age of 98.

== Books ==
In 2010 his best-known book, which he spent more than a decade researching, The Jews' Secret Fleet, was published, about the participation of North American sailors in Aliyah Bet. He was himself was just such a volunteer participant. The then-illegal vessels brought more than half of the Holocaust survivors from displaced persons camps to Palestine, over which the British gave up the British Mandate of Palestine, after which the United Nations voted to establish Israel.

In 1973, Greenfield published a book along with his wife titled How to be an Oleh, or Things the Jewish Agency Never Told You. He founded and contributed editorially to Israel's first-ever English language magazine, FrontPage, and later a monthly titled Rossvet, aimed at Russian immigrants. Hana, a Holocaust survivor, wrote Fragments of Memory, which has been published in six languages. They founded the Czech Torah Network.

- Greenfield, Murray S (1960s). Is there an art of Israel. Murray S. Greenfield Gallery. OCLC 9222449.
- Greenfield, Murray S (1973). How to be an oleh, or, Things the Jewish Agency never told you. Israel Press. OCLC 234129906.
- Greenfield, Murray S; Hochstein, Joseph M (1987). The Jews' Secret Fleet: The Untold Story of North American Volunteers Who Smashed the British Blockade of Palestine. Jerusalem and New York: Gefen Publishing House. ISBN 978-965-229-517-0.

== Films ==
In 2008 a documentary film directed by Alan Rosenthal was released, Waves of Freedom, which features Murray Greenfield. Rosenthal was inspired to create the documentary after reading Greenfield's book The Jews’ Secret Fleet, which has an introduction by Martin Gilbert. A new edition of The Jews’ Secret Fleet was published in 2010.

== Sources ==
- Halkin, Hillel (July 31, 2007). "Remember Aliyah Bet". The New York Sun. Ronald Weintraub.
