= SS HaTikva =

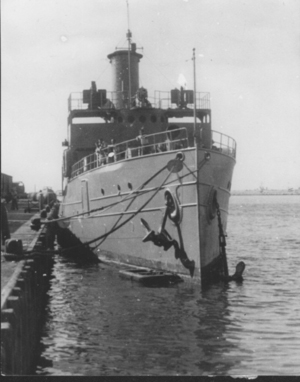
SS HaTikva

SS HaTikva (from Hebrew: התקוה, 'hope') was a ship which took part in the attempts of in the illegal immigration (Aliyah Bet) to Mandatory Palestine in 1947.

Originally USCGC Gresham, she was acquired by the Mossad LeAliyah Bet in February 1947. In May 1947, she carried 1,414 Jewish refugees from Italy to Haifa and was renamed Hatikva during this voyage. The crew and passengers were arrested by the British authorities and interned in Cyprus.

== History ==
=== "Gresham" - in service with the US Coast Guard ===
The ship was built in Cleveland in 1896 for the United States Coast Guard and named "Gresham". She operated in Lake Michigan until the beginning of World War I. During the war, she escorted coastal convoys, watched for U-boats and naval raiders, and helped train naval crews. She participated in the Spanish–American War in 1898.

During World War II, she served with the Coast Guard on the East Coast of the United States including submarine detection in the Atlantic Ocean. After being decommissioned from Coast Guard service, she was used as a banana merchant ship under the name Tradewinds.

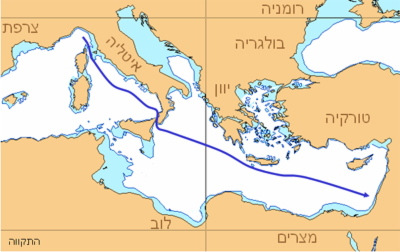
The route of the SS HaTikva

=== "Hatikva" - an illegal immigrant ship ===
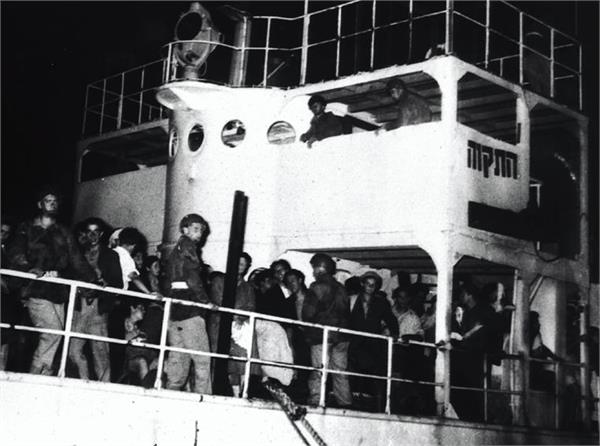
Illegal immigrants and British soldiers onboard the SS HaTikva after it was towed to the Port of Haifa

In February 1947 she quietly became one of the 12 vessels purchased in America by the Mossad for Aliya Bet to carry Jewish refugees from Europe, many only months out of concentration camps, to Mandatory Palestine past the British blockade. The Tradewinds was purchased by the Mossad for Aliya Bet through a front company called 'the 'Weston Trading Company' which was created for this purpose. The ship began its journey to Mandatory Palestine in Miami, with a non-Jewish hired captain and a crew of mostly Jewish American volunteers. Some of these volunteers were qualified as professional mariners and some were Navy veterans who at least had been to sea. Others had no knowledge of shipboard routines and would have to learn their jobs at sea.

From Miami, the ship sailed to Baltimore for repairs. In early March of that year, she sailed to Lisbon for renovations, where structures were built to transport immigrants. The ship's preparation in Lisbon was led by Yehuda Baharav, a member of the Mossad for Aliyah Bet, who acted under the guise of a representative of United Fruit Co. under the pseudonym Captain Diamond.

The Portuguese police arrested Baharav because they suspected the ship's purpose. Immediately after his arrest, the ship was able to leave the port because she was anchored at a dock and not tied to a pier. The ship sailed to Marseille and then continued to Port de Bouc in southern France. Yehuda Baharav was released shortly after his arrest.

Subsequently, the ship arrived in Italy where many illegal immigrants, mostly concentration camp survivors, boarded the ship by rafts, from a cove in Bogliasco. Due to rough conditions, the rest of the immigrants were transported to another secluded anchorage at the mouth of the Magra river, from which they too boarded the HaTikva. The Tradewinds sailed for Palestine on May 8, 1947, with 1,414 illegal immigrants on board. The captain was Sidney Yellin, who replaced the American captain and the ship's commander was Israel Rotem, a member of the Palyam.

The voyage passed without any unusual incidents until May 16, when the ship was discovered by a British reconnaissance plane. After aerial identification, as the ship no longer needed concealment, its name was changed to the SS Hatikvah (meaning "hope' in Hebrew), which was written on the side of the deck structure. Soon after, a British destroyer appeared and followed the Hatikvah. The next day, five additional destroyers joined in and one pulled alongside, calling to the captain of Hatikvah, “Your voyage is illegal, and your vessel is unseaworthy. In the name of humanity surrender.”

On May 17, 1947, the HaTikva was forcibly intercepted, rammed, and captured by the destroyers HMS Venus and HMS Brissenden. Upon boarding, Royal Navy sailors and marines used tear gas, rifle butts, and batons to enforce their directives. The crew and refugees resisted, throwing canned goods and by hand to hand combat. The victory inevitably went to the British, while the defenders ceased resistance, having children and pregnant women onboard.

The ship was towed to Haifa Port on the evening of May 17, and by 2:00 A.M. most of the illegal immigrants were transferred to ships that departed for a detention camp in Cyprus. According to press reports, 1411 immigrants were deported, without significant resistance, including 895 men, 479 women and 37 children. Most of the 27 American volunteers were deported to Cypress as well, among the refugees.

=== In the service of the State of Israel, the Israeli Navy ===
The ship was tied to the dock at Haifa Port as part of the Shadow Fleet until April 1948, when it was operated by the Ships and Ships Company to bring immigrants from the detention camps in Cyprus and France to the Land of Israel.

During the War of Independence in May 1948, the ship was commissioned into the Navy, bearing the name 'HaTikva K-22'. As it turned out, the ship was declared unseaworthy and she was returned to the Ships and Ships Company. She was subsequently decommissioned and scrapped in 1951.

An event hosted by the Cyprus Immigrants Organization and organized by Murray Greenfield, who served on the SS HaTikva as a second officer (and the author of 'The Jews secret Fleet'), between Hatikva boatmen and their families, in Israel in 2007.
