= Patria disaster =

1940 ship bombing in Haifa, Mandatory Palestine

Coordinates: 32°48′48″N 35°1′37″E

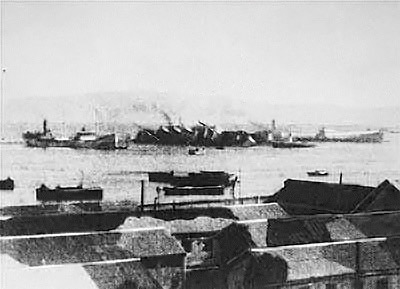
SS Patria sinking in Haifa port

The Patria disaster was the sinking on 25 November 1940 by the Jewish paramilitary organization Haganah of a French-built ocean liner, the 11,885-ton SS Patria, in the port of Haifa.

Patria was about to depart with about 1,800 Jewish refugees whom the British authorities were deporting to Mauritius. Zionist organizations opposed the deportation, and Haganah planted a bomb intended to prevent the ship from leaving Haifa. The Haganah claims to have miscalculated the effects of the explosion. The bomb blew the steel frame off one full side of the ship and the ship sank in less than 16 minutes, killing 267 people and injuring 172. The British allowed the survivors to remain in Mandatory Palestine on humanitarian grounds.

Who was responsible and the true reason why Patria sank remained controversial until 1957, when Meir Mardor, the person who planted the bomb, published a book about his experiences.

== Background ==
Before the government of Nazi Germany decided in 1941 to exterminate all Jews in Europe, its policy allowed the reduction of Jewish numbers in Europe by emigration. Jewish organizations, both mainstream and dissident, ran operations that tried to bring Jews from Europe to Palestine in violation of the immigration rules applied by the British government.

This required cooperation with the Nazi authorities, who saw the opportunity to make trouble for Britain as well as to get rid of Jews. The Zentralstelle für jüdische Auswanderung (Central Office for Jewish Emigration or ZjA) worked under the supervision of Adolf Eichmann, organizing Jewish emigration from the Nazi-controlled parts of Europe. In September 1940 the ZjA chartered three ships, SS Pacific, SS Milos and SS Atlantic, to take Jewish refugees from the Romanian port of Tulcea to Palestine. Their passengers consisted of about 3,600 refugees from the Jewish communities of Vienna, Danzig and Prague.

Pacific first reached Palestinian waters on 1 November, followed by Milos a few later that same day. The Royal Navy intercepted the ships and escorted them to the port of Haifa. Warned in advance of the ships' arrival, the British Colonial Office was determined to refuse entry to the immigrants. With the security situation in the region improving following British successes in the Western Desert Campaign, the Colonial Office decided it was less risky to provoke Jewish anger than to risk an Arab revolt, and that an example would be made to dissuade other potential immigrants from making the attempt.

The British High Commissioner for Palestine, Sir Harold MacMichael, issued a deportation order on 20 November, ordering that the refugees be taken to the British Indian Ocean territory of Mauritius and the Caribbean territory of Trinidad.

The refugees were transferred to another ship, SS Patria, for the voyage to Mauritius. Patria was an 11,885-ton ocean liner dating from 1913 that the French company Messageries Maritimes ran between Marseille and the Levant. She had reached the Port of Haifa shortly before Italy declared war on France and Britain, and then remained in port for safety. After the French surrender to Nazi Germany the British authorities in Haifa first detained Patria and then seized her for use as a troop ship. As a civilian liner she was permitted to carry 805 people including her crew, but after being requisitioned she was authorised to carry 1,800 troops (excluding the crew). She still only had enough lifeboats for the original 805 passengers and crew, so these were supplemented with liferafts.

The refugees from Pacific and Milos were soon transferred to Patria. Atlantic arrived on 24 November and the transfer of eight hundred of its 1,645 passengers began.

== Bombing ==
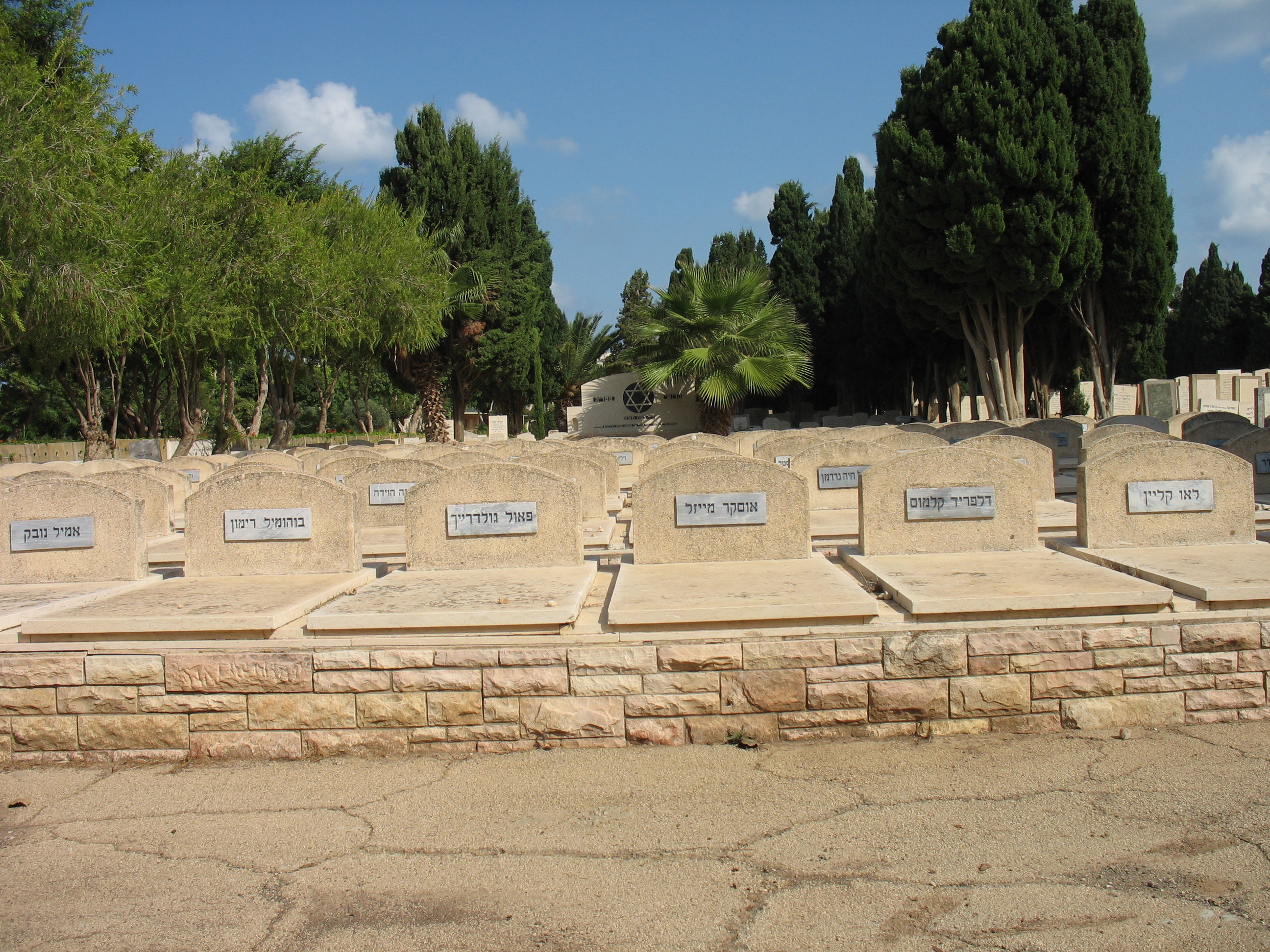
Graves of some of the victims of the sinking

Meanwhile, Zionist organizations were considering how to thwart the deportation plan. A general strike had little effect. The Irgun tried unsuccessfully to place a bomb on Patria to disable her. The Haganah also sought to disable Patria, with the intention of forcing her to stay in port for repairs and thus gaining time to press the British to rescind the deportation order. The Haganah officer in charge of the operation was Yitzhak Sadeh, authorised by Moshe Sharett, who led the Political Department of the Jewish Agency in the temporary absence of David Ben-Gurion, who had left for the United States on 22 September and did not return until 13 February 1941.

On 22 November Haganah agents smuggled a 2-kilogram (4.4 lb) bomb aboard the ship, timed to explode at 9 p.m. that day. It failed, so a second, more powerful bomb was smuggled aboard on 24 November and hidden next to the ship's inner hull. At 9 a.m. on 25 November, it exploded. The Haganah had miscalculated the effect of the charge and it blew a large hole measuring 3 by 2 metres (9.8 ft × 6.6 ft) in the ship's side, sinking her in only 16 minutes.

When the bomb exploded, Patria was carrying 1,770 refugees transferred from Pacific and Milos and had taken on board 134 passengers from Atlantic. Most were rescued by British and Arab boats that rushed to the scene. However, 267 people were declared missing – over 200 Jewish refugees plus 50 crew and British soldiers – and another 172 were injured. Many of the dead were trapped in Patria's hold and were unable to escape as she rolled on her side and sank. 209 bodies were eventually recovered and buried in Haifa.

== Aftermath ==
The surviving refugees from Patria, together with the remaining 1,560 passengers of Atlantic, were taken to the Atlit detainee camp. Later, after an international campaign, the survivors of Patria were given permits to stay in Palestine. However, the other Atlantic passengers were deported to Mauritius on 9 December. After the war they were given the choice of where to go; 81% chose Palestine and arrived there in August 1945.

In December 1945 Ha-Po'el ha-Tza'ir ("Young Worker") a Mapai party newspaper, commented "On one bitter and impetuous day, a malicious hand sank the ship". The comment was written by the deputy editor, Israel Cohen, who did not know that all of the people responsible were Mapai leaders. Angered by the newspaper's comments, some Haganah leaders sent Ben-Gurion's son Amos to the newspaper office where he slapped the editor, Isaac Lofven, across the face.

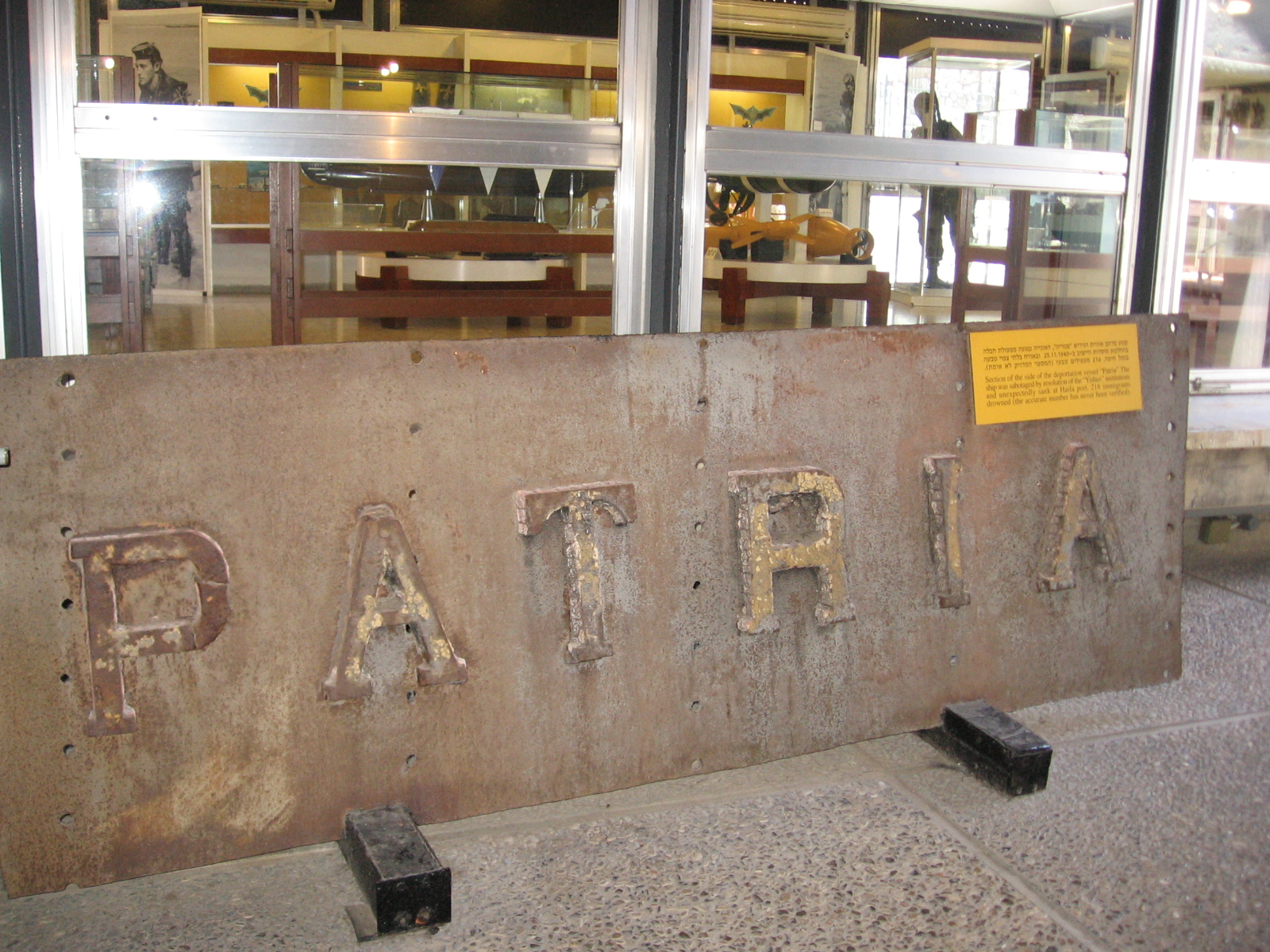
A nameplate preserved from Patria

A bitter debate over the correctness of the operation raged in secret within the Zionist leadership. The decision had been made by an activist faction, without consulting more moderate members according to normal procedure, and this caused serious internal divisions that persisted for many years. The bombing was ordered by Moshe Sharett as David Ben-Gurion was away at the time of the bombing. An effort was made to enshrine the incident as an icon of Zionist determination, but this largely failed. As early as 15 December 1945 Isaac Lofven warned a Mapai meeting against trying to "sanctify" the tragedy.

Some leaders of the Yishuv (the Jewish community in Palestine) argued that the loss of life had not been in vain, as Patria's survivors had been allowed to stay in the country. Others declared that the Haganah had had no right to risk the lives of the immigrants, as they had not decided of their own free will to become participants in the underground Jewish conflict with the British authorities.

The Haganah's role was not publicly revealed and a story was put out that the deportees, out of despair, had sunk the ship themselves (the version recounted, for example, by Arthur Koestler). For years Britain believed the Irgun was probably responsible.

The Haganah's role was finally publicly disclosed in 1957 when Munya Mardor, the operative who had planted the bomb, wrote an account of his activities in the Jewish underground. He recounted, "There was never any intent to cause the ship to sink. The British would have used this against the Jewish population and show it as an act of sabotage against the war effort". He said that it was in the highest interest of the Haganah to fight the sanctions of the British White Paper of 1939, and the primary objective was to avoid casualties. The British estimated 267 people were killed, but neither the Jewish Agency nor the Haganah could establish how many people escaped the sinking and how many had died.

Munya Mardor continued to work at the port in order to remove suspicion from himself. The Haganah also put up an investigative body to find out why such a relatively small amount of explosives could create such a large hole in the ship. The Haganah investigators concluded that the boat's superstructure was in poor condition, and therefore unable to withstand the pressure of the explosion.

Rudolf Hirsch, a Jewish-German writer who had emigrated to Palestine in 1939, was a close associate of Arnold Zweig there, and later remigrated with Zweig to East Germany, published a novel about the incident, Patria Israel, in which he also explicitly refers to Mardor's account.

== See also ==
- Aliyah Bet
- SS Exodus
- SS Ocean Vigour
- Struma disaster
- Malchiel Gruenwald (1882–1958) was allegedly implicated in the Patria affair

== Other sources ==
- Wasserstein, B (1979). Britain and the Jews of Europe 1939–45. Oxford: Clarendon Press. pp. not cited. ISBN 0198226004.
- Ofer, Dalia (1984). "The Rescue of European Jewry and Illegal Immigration to Palestine in 1940. Prospects and Reality: Berthold Storfer and the Mossad le'Aliyah Bet". Modern Judaism. 4 (2): 159–181. doi:10.1093/mj/4.2.159.
- Ramona, Philippe. "Le Patria". L'Encyclopedie des Messageries Maritimes (in French). Philippe Ramona.
