= Hana Greenfield =

Hana Greenfield (née Lustigová; 3 November 1926 – 27 January 2014) was born in Kolín, Czechoslovakia, from where she was deported to the concentration camps of Theresienstadt, Auschwitz and Bergen Belsen.

== Background ==
She is the author of Fragments of Memory (Gefen Publishing House, c. 1998, revised edition 2006) and Suspicious children are watching (Gefen Publishing House, c. 1998, revised edition 2006). Her book is a memoir comprising a collection of articles written over a period of a few years. Many of her accounts have appeared in publications in various languages: Hebrew, Polish, French, Yiddish, English, German and Czech. Her original research paper on the fate of the "Białystok children" was first published in England at the 1988 Oxford University conference "Remembering for the Future".

Greenfield was a member of the board of the Terezin Ghetto Museum, where her program for teaching Czech children tolerance, and educating them about the Holocaust, serves thousands of youth annually. Along with her husband, Murray Greenfield, she was a co-founder of Gefen Publishing House. Greenfield is also the founder of the Hana Greenfield Fund.

Following her liberation from Bergen-Belsen on 15 April 1945, Greenfield moved to London, soon decided to make aliyah to Israel, and has resided there with her family until her death. Hana died on January 27, 2014, in Tel Aviv after a long illness.

== Writings ==
Greenfield, Hana (1998, revised edition 2006). Fragments of Memory. Gefen Publishing House. ISBN 965-229-379-2.
