= Syrna (island) =

Greek island in the Aegean Sea

Syrna Σύρνα
- Settlement
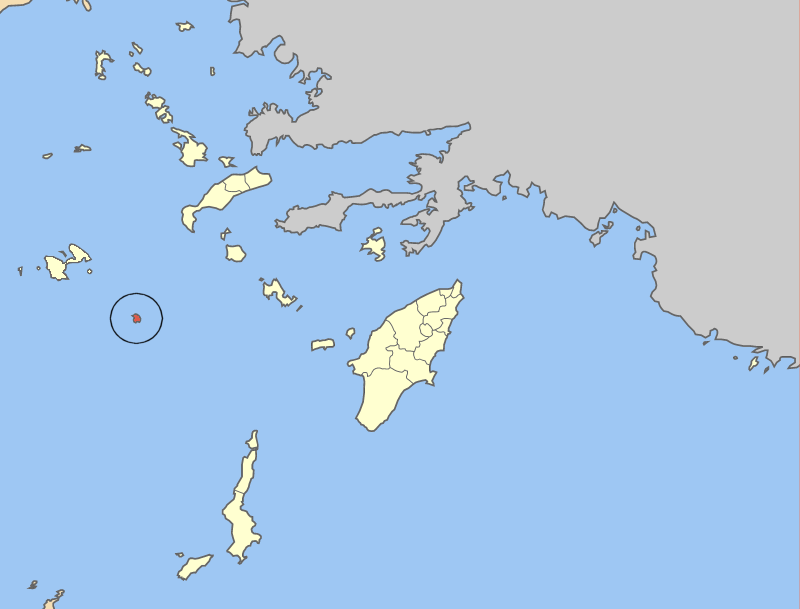
- Location of Syrna in the Dodecanese

- Location within Greece
- Coordinates: 36°20.33′N 26°40.38′E
- Country: Greece
- Time zone: UTC+2 (EET)
  - Summer (DST): UTC+3 (EEST)
- Postal code: 855 xx
- Area code: 22470
- Vehicle registration: ΚΧ, ΡΟ, ΡΚ

Syrna (Greek: Σύρνα; anciently, Syrnos (Ancient Greek: Σύρνος) or Sirna or Agios Ioannis, is a small island about 4 km^{2} in area to the south-east of Astypalaia in the Dodecanese group of Greek islands, situated to the south-east of the country. It is mostly covered with juniper and garrigue scrub. The few inhabitants raise livestock, catch fish and practice arable agriculture. The island is important for migrant and breeding seabirds and raptors, including Cory's shearwater, yelkouan shearwater and Eleonora's falcon.

== History ==
A shipwreck of the late Roman period (2nd century CE) was found using sonar technology near the island by the Hellenic Centre for Marine Research in 2000.

On 7 December 1946, the ship Athina Rafiah (originally the SS Athena) carrying Jewish immigrants to Haifa in Palestine, modern-day Israel, was wrecked in the Agiou Soassin Bay, on the south coast of Syrna, and more than seven hundred survivors came ashore on the island. The British minesweeper HMS Providence, working with HMS Chevron, HHMS Themistocles and HHMS Aegean managed to rescue the survivors.

An extra dimension to the incident is added in a reminiscence by Dr Raymond Mills, who, with a medical team, and Lawrence Durrell, was sent from Rhodes on the Greek warship Kriti (originally HMS Hursley) to assist the sick and wounded and return them to hospital on Rhodes. Mills attests to the added intervention of "the flagship of the Palestine Patrol, HMS Javelin, together with two minesweepers", and records that eight of the refugees had perished in the aftermath of the wreck and had been buried on the island.
