= HMS Providence (J325) =

Minesweeper of the Royal Navy

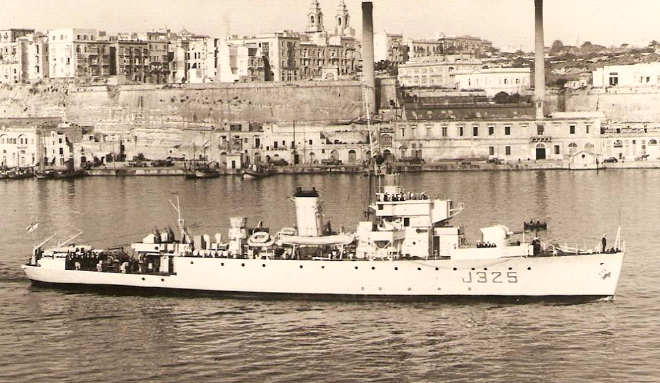
- The ship in Valletta 1946

History

United Kingdom
- Name: HMS Providence
- Builder: Redfern Construction Co., Toronto
- Laid down: 17 July 1943
- Launched: 27 October 1943
- Commissioned: 15 May 1944
- Renamed: Constructed as HMCS Forrest Hill; Renamed HMS Providence in June 1943
- Identification: Pennant number J325
- Fate: Scrapped from 17 May 1958

General characteristics
- Class & type: Algerine-class minesweeper
- Displacement: 1,030 long tons (1,047 t) (standard); 1,325 long tons (1,346 t) (deep)
- Length: 225 ft (69 m) o/a
- Beam: 35 ft 6 in (10.82 m)
- Draught: 12.25 ft 6 in (3.89 m)
- Installed power: 2 × Admiralty 3-drum boilers; 2,400 ihp (1,800 kW)
- Propulsion: 2 shafts; 2 vertical triple-expansion steam engines
- Speed: 16.5 knots (30.6 km/h; 19.0 mph)
- Range: 5,000 nmi (9,300 km; 5,800 mi) at 10 knots (19 km/h; 12 mph)
- Complement: 85
- Armament: 1 × QF 4 in (102 mm) Mk V anti-aircraft gun; 4 × twin Oerlikon 20 mm cannon

HMS Providence was a reciprocating engine-powered Algerine-class minesweeper during the Second World War. Laid down as HMCS Forrest Hill for the Royal Canadian Navy she was transferred on completion to the Royal Navy as HMS Providence. She survived the war and was scrapped in 1958.

== Design and description ==
The reciprocating group displaced 1,010–1,030 long tons (1,030–1,050 t) at standard load and 1,305–1,325 long tons (1,326–1,346 t) at deep load The ships measured 225 feet (68.6 m) long overall with a beam of 35 feet 6 inches (10.8 m). They had a draught of 12 feet 3 inches (3.7 m). The ships' complement consisted of 85 officers and ratings.

The reciprocating ships had two vertical triple-expansion steam engines, each driving one shaft, using steam provided by two Admiralty three-drum boilers. The engines produced a total of 2,400 indicated horsepower (1,800 kW) and gave a maximum speed of 16.5 knots (30.6 km/h; 19.0 mph). They carried a maximum of 660 long tons (671 t) of fuel oil that gave them a range of 5,000 nautical miles (9,300 km; 5,800 mi) at 10 knots (19 km/h; 12 mph).

The Algerine class was armed with a QF 4 in (102 mm) Mk V anti-aircraft gun and four twin-gun mounts for Oerlikon 20 mm cannon. The latter guns were in short supply when the first ships were being completed and they often got a proportion of single mounts. By 1944, single-barrel Bofors 40 mm mounts began replacing the twin 20 mm mounts on a one for one basis. All of the ships were fitted for four throwers and two rails for depth charges.

== Construction and career ==
Providence was ordered as HMCS Forrest Hill in 1942, and laid down at the Toronto yards of Redfern Construction Ltd on 17 July 1943. She was renamed Providence in June 1943, and was launched on 27 October 1943. Her conversion to a minesweeper was completed on 15 May 1944. She served during the last years of the Second World War.

After the war, Providence participated in the Palestine Patrol. On 1 November 1946, she escorted the listing merchant vessel SS San Dimitrio, full of Jewish refugees, into Haifa. On 10 December, Providence participated in the rescue of more refugees from the shipwrecked SS Athina, which had grounded in Syrna.

Providence was subsequently sold for scrapping, and arrived at the yards of Young, of Sunderland on 17 May 1958.

== Bibliography ==
- Chesneau, Roger, ed. (1980). Conway's All the World's Fighting Ships 1922–1946. Greenwich, UK: Conway Maritime Press. ISBN 0-85177-146-7.
- Colledge, J. J.; Warlow, Ben (2006) [1969]. Ships of the Royal Navy: The Complete Record of All Fighting Ships of the Royal Navy from the 15th Century to the Present (3rd Rev ed.). London: Chatham Publishing. ISBN 978-1-86176-281-8. OCLC 67375475.
- Elliott, Peter (1977). Allied Escort Ships of World War II: A complete survey. London: Macdonald and Jane's. ISBN 0-356-08401-9.
- Lenton, H. T. (1998). British & Empire Warships of the Second World War. Annapolis, Maryland: Naval Institute Press. ISBN 1-55750-048-7.
