= Bracha Fuld =

Jewish resistance fighter

- ברכה פולד
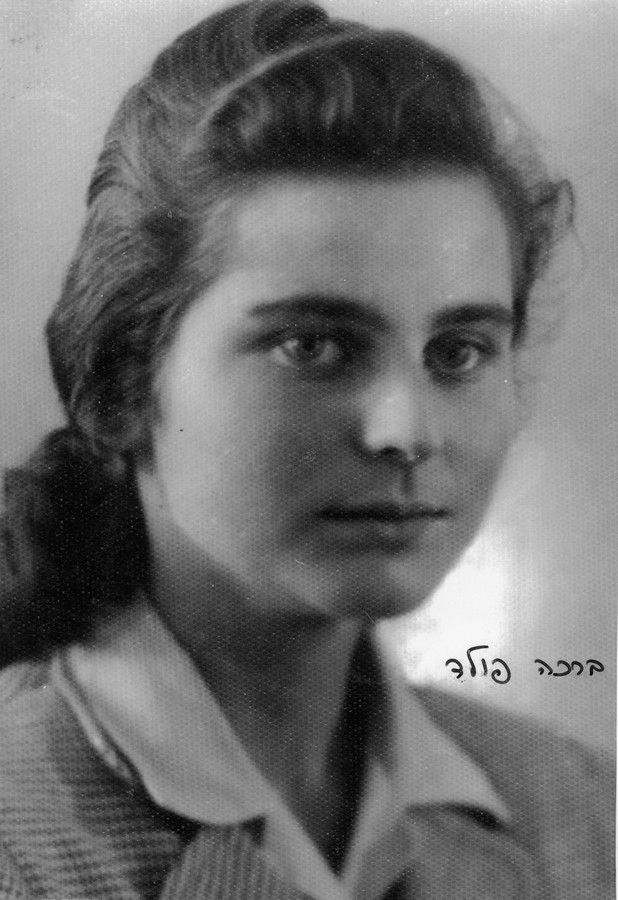
- Born: Barbara Fuld; December 26, 1927; Berlin, Weimar Republic
- Died: March 26, 1946 (aged 18); Tel Aviv, Mandatory Palestine
- Cause of death: Gunshot wounds
- Monuments: Bracha Fuld Street in Tel Aviv
- Organization: Palmach

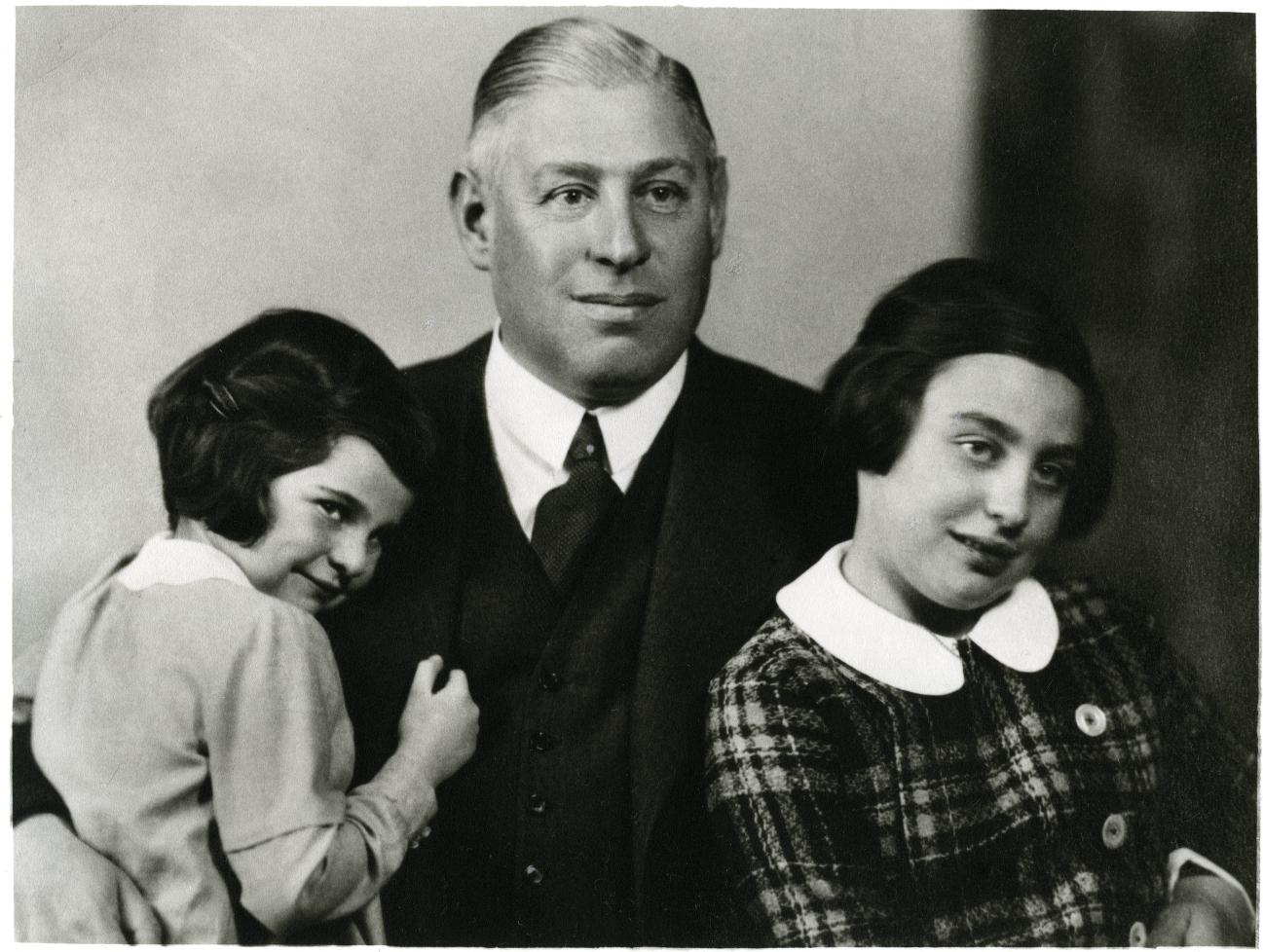
Bracha Fuld (left) with her father Lothar Fuld (1886-1938) and her sister Hannelore (also known as Petra), circa 1930. Source: Netzorg Family Papers Collection, box 35, Petra and Bracha Fuld. University of Michigan Bentley Historical Library.

Bracha Fuld (Hebrew: ברכה פולד; born Barbara Fuld; December 26, 1927 – March 26, 1946) was a German-born Jewish guerrilla fighter who was killed while attempting to escort illegal Jewish immigrants into Palestine. During the operation, she encountered British security forces and got into a shootout in which she was fatally wounded. Fuld was the first female Jewish insurgent to be killed during the Jewish insurgency in Mandatory Palestine.

== Early life ==
Fuld was born Barbara Fuld in 1927 in Berlin, Germany. Her father had served in the Imperial German Army during World War I, and he took his own life after the events of Kristallnacht in 1938, unable to reconcile his Jewish and German identities.

Fuld's older sister, Hannelore, also known as "Petra" (1923-2008, later Mrs. Morton Netzorg), had been sent to the United States to escape antisemitism. In 1939, Fuld left Germany and immigrated with her mother to Palestine, where Fuld became known as Bracha instead of Barbara. Fuld's mother, Charlotte "Lotte" Fuld, opened a candy store.

== Military career ==
Upon graduating high school in 1944, aged 16, Fuld joined the Palmach, an elite Jewish military force that was working with the British. She was assigned to "H" company and stationed in Kibbutz Kiryat Anavim, near Jerusalem. She was named an outstanding cadet, and was one of the few women who trained to become a squad commander. She was made an officer at the age of eighteen. Fuld first instructed women soldiers, and was later put in charge of several platoons and military detachments. Fuld met and fell in love with fellow Palmach member Gideon Peli. In 1944, Peli was arrested while conducting a training exercise with Palmach commanders. A British military court sentenced him to 7 years in prison for carrying an unlicensed weapon. While in prison, Fuld and Peli wrote letters to each other, with Fuld visiting him regularly. In June 1947, Peli was released from prison. He would be killed in action in the Battle of al-Qastal, Jerusalem during the civil war in Mandatory Palestine on March 17, 1948.

At the end of World War II, the British attempted to stop Jewish Holocaust refugees from coming to Palestine, and the Palmach fighters revolted. They began to sabotage and assault the British military, while helping to smuggle Jewish immigrants into Palestine.

== Death and legacy ==
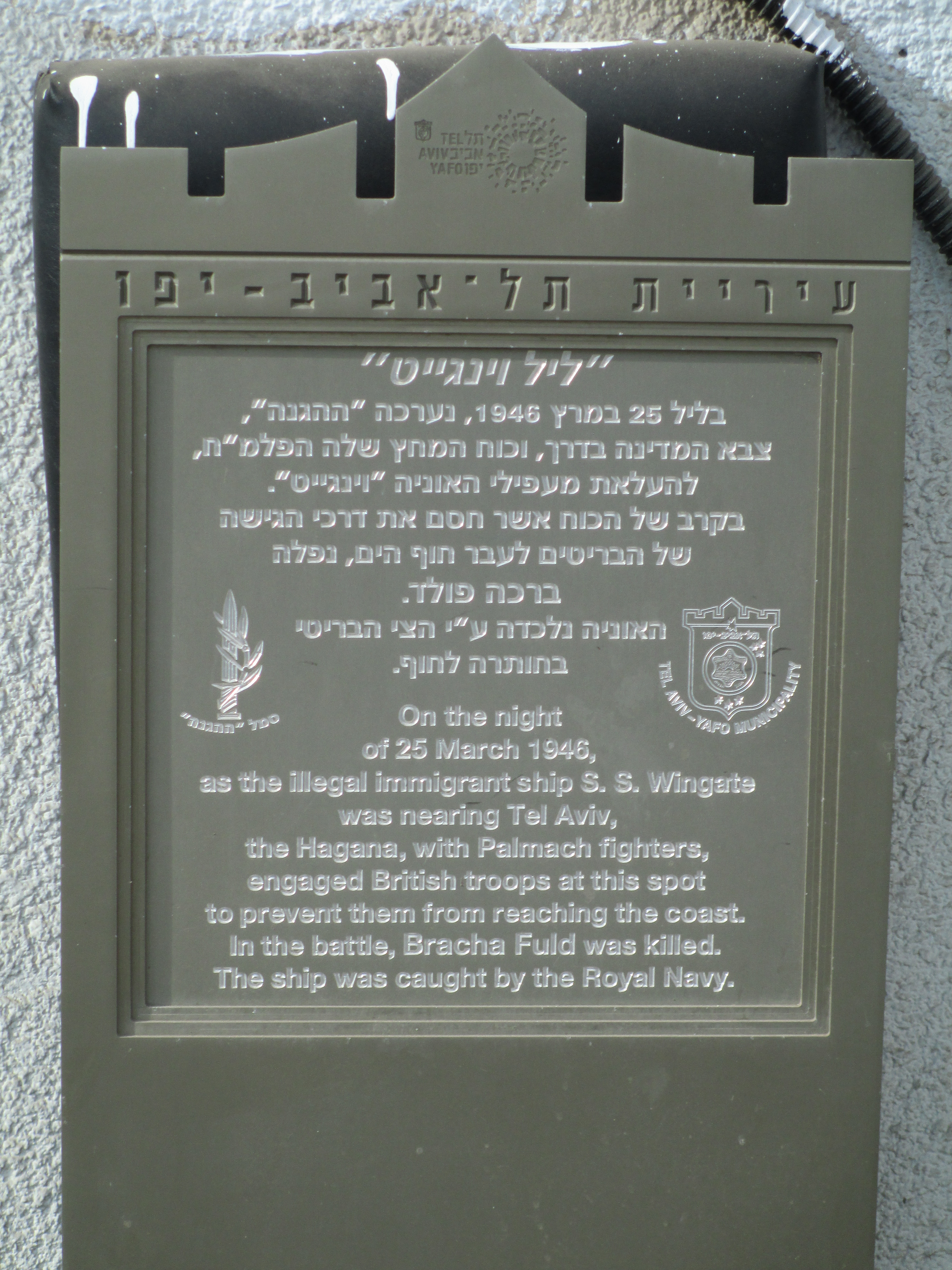
Memorial plaque dedicated to Fuld

In March 1946, a ship of illegal Jewish migrants from Italy was set to arrive in Palestine. Fuld and her squad were sent to protect a stretch of road that would be used to help the immigrants reach safety. The ship was captured and diverted by the British to Atlit before arriving, but the message to abort the mission did not reach Fuld and her squad in time, and they soon encountered a British tank unit. After an exchange of fire, Fuld was badly wounded. Instead of receiving medical treatment, she was taken to a police station to be interrogated, and she died of her injuries shortly afterwards on March 26, 1946. Fuld was the first female Jewish fighter killed resisting the British during the pre-state conflict.

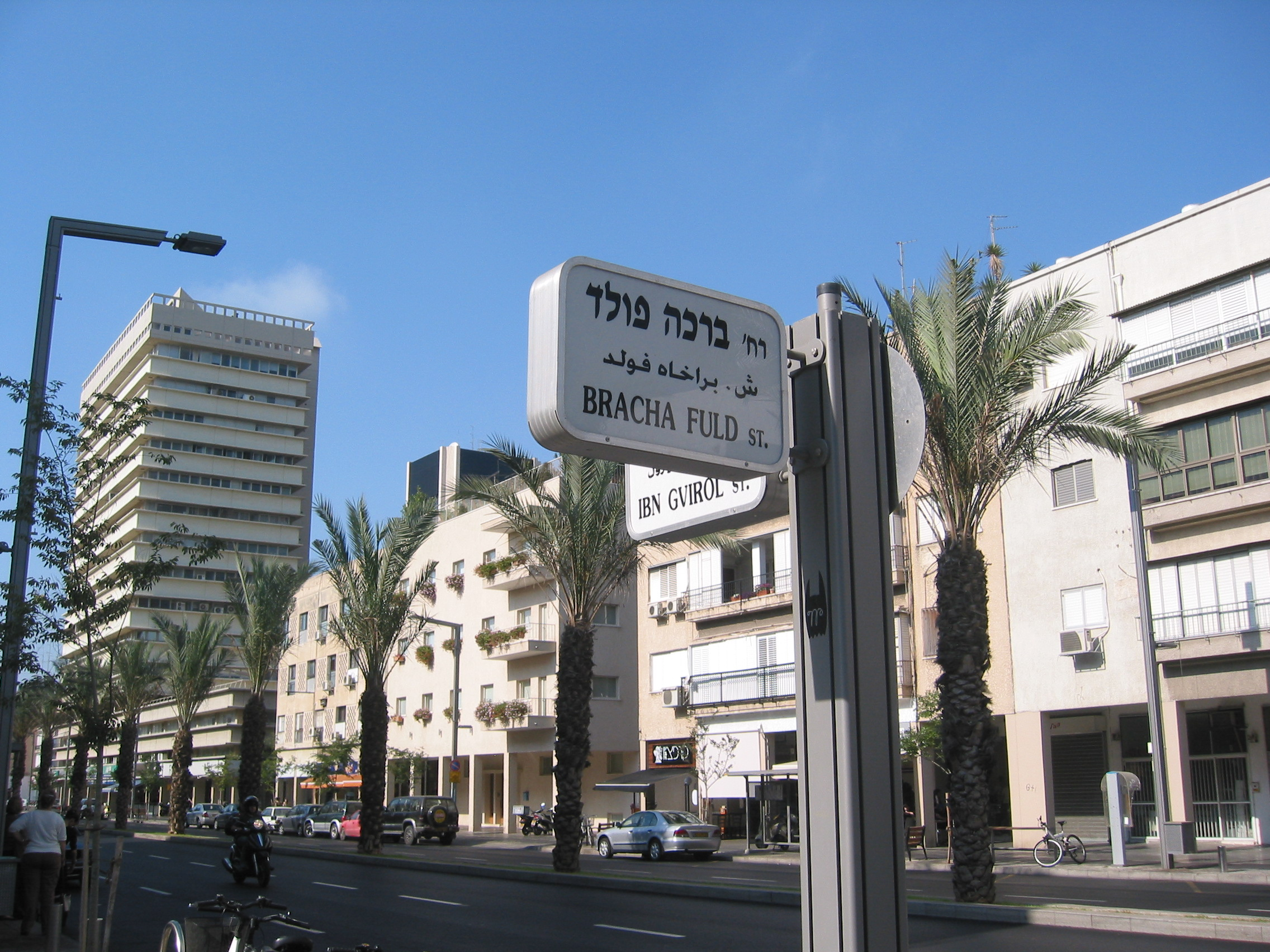
Bracha Fuld Street in Tel Aviv

Six months after her death, a ship for transporting illegal Jewish immigrants was named the S. S. Bracha Fuld, which the British soon seized. The song “Banu Heinah” (We Came Here) was written to memorialize her.

In the city of Tel Aviv, Bracha Fuld Street is named in her honour.
