= SS Patria (1913) =

1913 ocean liner

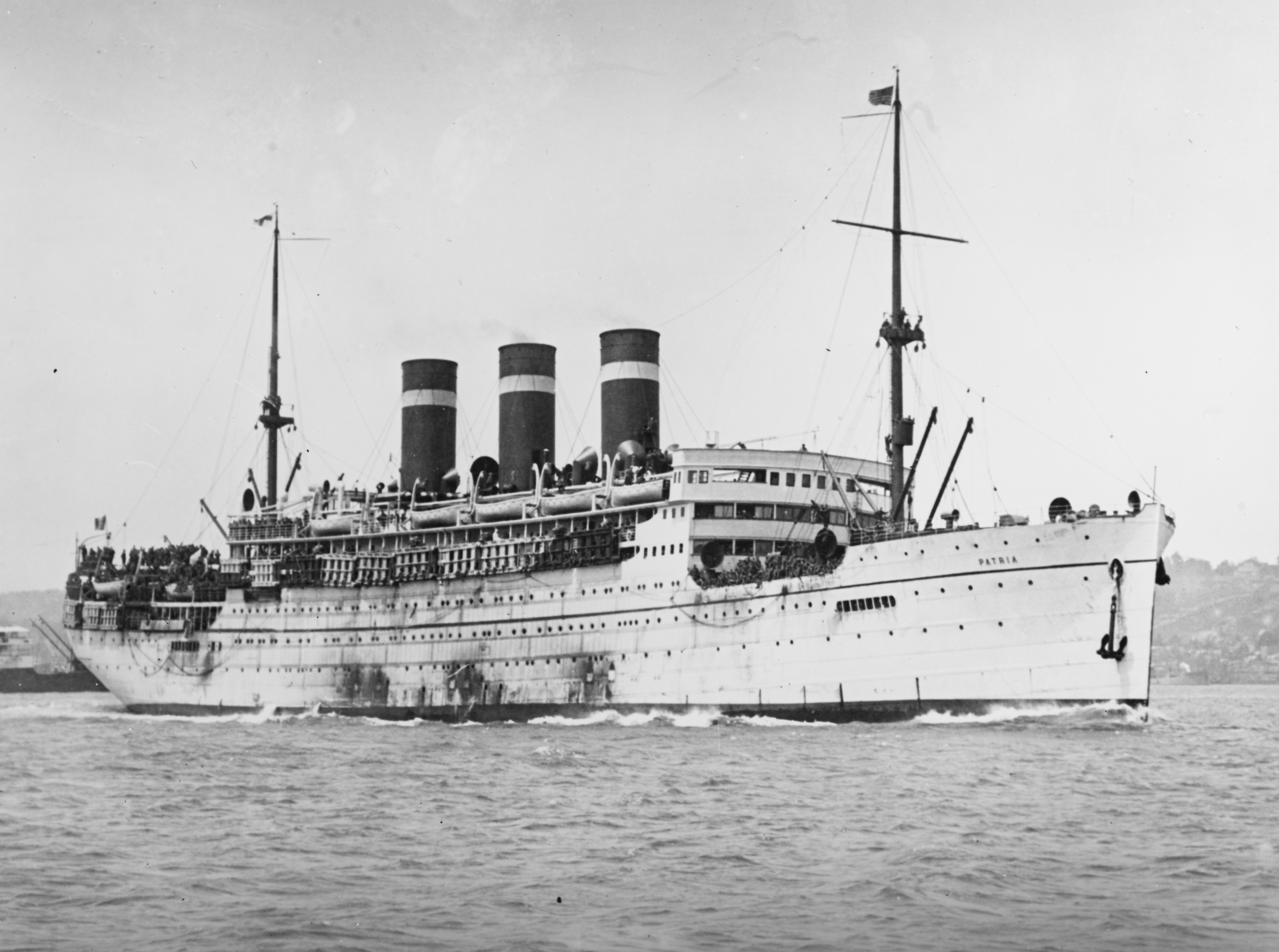
- Patria photographed in 1918-1919, while transporting American troops

History

France
- Name: SS Patria
- Namesake: patria, Latin for "fatherland"
- Owner: Compagnie française de Navigation à vapeur Cyprien Fabre & Cie (Fabre Line); Services Contractuels des Messageries Maritimes (1940)
- Operator: Services Contractuels des Messageries Maritimes (1932–40); British-India Steam Navigation Company (1940)
- Port of registry: (France) Marseille; (United Kingdom)
- Builder: Société Nouvelle des Forges et Chantiers de la Méditerranée
- Launched: 11 November 1913
- In service: 15 or 16 April 1914
- Out of service: 25 November 1940
- Identification: code letters OQDZ; (1914–33); call sign FOHH; (1934–40)
- Fate: sunk by sabotage 25 November 1940; scrapped 1952

General characteristics
- Type: Ocean liner
- Tonnage: 11,885 GRT; tonnage under deck 9,189; 6,744 NRT
- Length: 487.2 ft (148.5 m)
- Beam: 59.2 ft (18.0 m)
- Draught: 40.1 ft (12.2 m)
- Installed power: 900 NHP
- Propulsion: twin screws powered by two triple expansion steam engines fed by nine boilers
- Speed: 15 knots (28 km/h; 17 mph); or 16 knots (30 km/h; 18 mph)
- Capacity: 675 passengers inc. 150 1st class & 300 2nd class (liner service); 2,240 passengers of which 140 1st class, 250 2nd class & 1,850 3rd class (as an emigrant ship); 1,800 troops (1940)
- Crew: 130

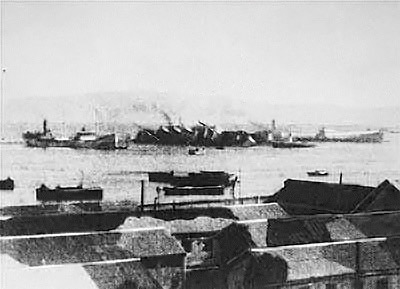
Patria sinking in the Port of Haifa, Palestine, November 1940

SS Patria was an 11,885 GRT French ocean liner built in 1913 for Compagnie française de Navigation à vapeur Cyprien Fabre & Cie (Fabre Line), for whom she was first a transatlantic liner and then an emigrant ship.

From 1932 Fabre Line leased her to Services Contractuels des Messageries Maritimes, who ran her between the south of France and the Levant. After the fall of France in June 1940 the British authorities in Mandatory Palestine seized her in the Port of Haifa and placed her under the management of the British-India Steam Navigation Company.

In November 1940, the Zionist organization Haganah planted a bomb aboard which sank her with the loss of between 260 and 300 lives. Patria remained a wreck in Haifa port until she was scrapped in 1952.

== With Fabre Line ==
Fabre Line ordered Patria and her sister ship SS Providence from Société Nouvelle des Forges et Chantiers de la Méditerranée of La Seyne-sur-Mer, near Toulon. Patria had seven decks and three funnels, but one of the funnels was a dummy. Patria had nine boilers feeding two three-cylinder triple expansion steam engines. The cylinder bores were 30.4" (high pressure), 49.36" (medium pressure) and 70.55" (low pressure), all with a stroke of 51.2". The engines gave Patria a total of 900 NHP and propelled the ship by twin screws. Patria had direction finding equipment and was the first ocean liner to be equipped with a cinema.

Patria was launched on 11 November 1913 and entered Fabre Line service on 15 or 16 April 1914.

The New York Times reported that a German submarine attacked her on 1 March 1916 off the coast of Tunis. There is no naval record of such an attack, so it is not clear what incident may have taken place. However, the captain of the ship at the time, Pierre Deschelles, stated in an affidavit that while he didn't see the German submarine, members of the crew and many passengers did.

She plied as a transatlantic liner between Marseille and New York from then until 1920, when she and Providence were reassigned to carrying emigrants to New York from Naples, Palermo and Marseille. After the Wall Street crash of 1929 Messageries Maritimes withdrew Patria from the emigrant trade in 1930, although Providence continued to carry emigrants until 1932.

== With Messageries Maritimes ==
On 19 January 1932, Fabre Line leased Patria for eight years to Messageries Maritimes, who placed her in service between the Levant and the south of France. Later that year, off the Ionian island of Zakynthos, Patria rescued three survivors from the sinking of a Greek vessel, the Tinios Stavtos. A Greek merchant ship, SS Heron, rescued 25 survivors from the same incident. In 1934 Patria grounded on a bank while entering the Port of Alexandria in Egypt. In February 1939 Patria served as a hospital ship in the Spanish Civil War.

On 1 January 1940, Fabre Line sold Patria to Messageries Maritimes. On 6 June 1940 she entered the Port of Haifa after sailing from Beirut. On 10 June Italy declared war on France and the UK. Any Allied ship passing Italy to reach France would now be in danger of attack, so Patria remained in port in Haifa.

== With British-India Steam Navigation ==
On 22 June 1940, France surrendered to Germany, and on 25 June the British Mandatory Palestine authorities barred Patria from leaving Haifa. The British authorities seized Patria on 15 August and placed her under the management of the British-India Steam Navigation Co. She was assigned to be a troop ship, authorised to carry 1,800 troops (excluding the crew). She still had only enough lifeboats for the original 805 passengers and crew, so these were supplemented with liferafts.

Despite her new designation Patria remained laid up in Haifa until the beginning of November 1940. In that month the Royal Navy intercepted three chartered ships; the SS Pacific, SS Milos and SS Atlantic, that were carrying Jewish refugees from German-occupied Europe to Palestine. The refugees lacked permits to enter Palestine so the British authorities ordered their deportation to British Mauritius in the Indian Ocean. Refugees from Pacific and Milos had been put aboard Patria, and embarkation of refugees from Atlantic had begun, when on 25 November a bomb planted by a Haganah agent, intending to disable the ship to prevent deportation by the British, blew a hole in the side of Patria's hull. She listed to that side and sank in 16 minutes, settling on the harbour bed with part of her hull and superstructure above water.

By the time of the attack almost 1,800 refugees had been embarked aboard Patria, along with a crew of 130 and numerous British guards. The majority of those aboard were rescued but 172 were injured and between 260 and 300 were killed. The majority of victims were Jewish refugees but about 50 were crew and British guards; 209 bodies were recovered and buried in Haifa.

Patria remained a wreck in Haifa port until 1952, when she was scrapped.

== See also ==
- Patria disaster
