= HMS Cheviot =

C-class destroyer

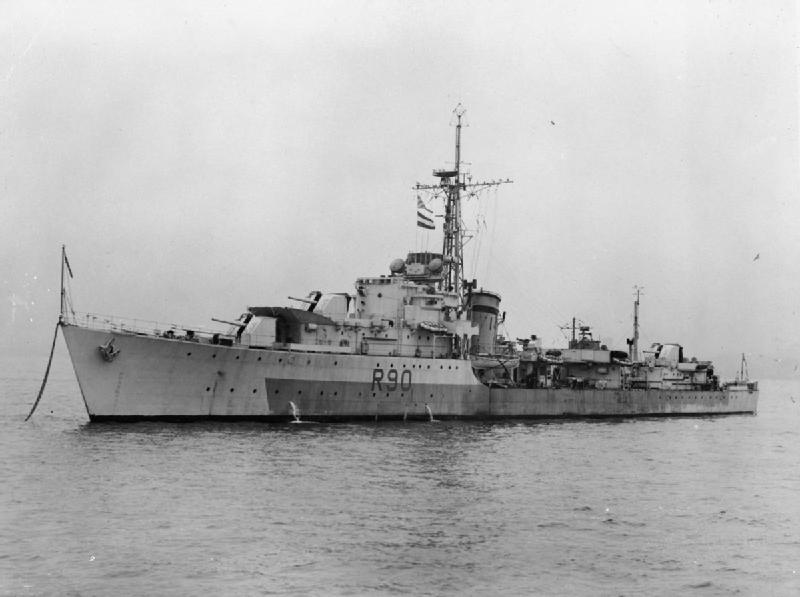
- Cheviot on completion, December 1945

History

United Kingdom
- Name: Cheviot
- Ordered: 24 July 1942
- Builder: Alexander Stephen & Sons, Linthouse
- Laid down: 27 April 1943
- Launched: 2 May 1944
- Commissioned: 11 December 1945
- Decommissioned: March 1960
- Identification: Pennant number: R90 later changed to D90
- Fate: Scrapped by Thos. W. Ward, Inverkeithing from 22 October 1962

General characteristics (as built)
- Class & type: C-class destroyer
- Displacement: 1,885 long tons (1,915 t) (standard)
- Length: 362 ft 9 in (110.6 m) o/a
- Beam: 35 ft 8 in (10.9 m)
- Draught: 15 ft 3 in (4.6 m) (full load)
- Installed power: 2 Admiralty 3-drum boilers; 40,000 shp (30,000 kW)
- Propulsion: 2 shafts; 2 geared steam turbines
- Speed: 36 knots (67 km/h; 41 mph)
- Range: 4,675 nautical miles (8,658 km; 5,380 mi) at 20 knots (37 km/h; 23 mph)
- Complement: 186
- Armament: 4 × single 4.5 in (114 mm) DP guns; 1 × twin 40 mm (1.6 in) AA gun; 2 × twin 20 mm (0.8 in) AA guns; 2 × quadruple 21 in (533 mm) torpedo tubes; 2 throwers and 2 racks for 35 depth charges

HMS Cheviot was one of thirty-two C-class destroyers built for the Royal Navy during the Second World War, a member of the eight-ship Ch sub-class. Completed after the war, she was sold for scrap in 1962.

== Design and description ==
The Ch sub-class was a repeat of the preceding Ca sub-class, except that the addition of remote control for the main-gun mounts caused some of the ships' intended weapons to be removed to save weight. Cheviot displaced 1,885 long tons (1,915 t) at standard load and 2,566 long tons (2,607 t) at deep load. They had an overall length of 362 feet 9 inches (110.6 m), a beam of 35 feet 8 inches (10.9 m) and a deep draught of 15 feet 3 inches (4.6 m).

The ships were powered by a pair of geared steam turbines, each driving one propeller shaft using steam provided by two Admiralty three-drum boilers. The turbines developed a total of 40,000 indicated horsepower (30,000 kW) and gave a speed of 36 knots (67 km/h; 41 mph) at normal load. During her sea trials, Cheviot reached a speed of 32.3 knots (59.8 km/h; 37.2 mph) at a load of 2,312 long tons (2,349 t). The Ch sub-class carried enough fuel oil to give them a range of 4,675 nautical miles (8,658 km; 5,380 mi) at 15 knots (28 km/h; 17 mph). The ships' complement was 186 officers and ratings.

The main armament of the destroyers consisted of four QF 4.5-inch (114 mm) Mk IV dual-purpose guns, one superfiring pair each fore and aft of the superstructure protected by partial gun shields. Their anti-aircraft suite consisted of one twin-gun stabilised Mk IV "Hazemeyer" mount for 40-millimetre (1.6 in) Bofors guns and two four twin mounts for 20-millimetre (0.8 in) Oerlikon AA guns. To compensate for the weight of the remote control equipment, one of the two quadruple 21-inch (533 mm) torpedo tube mounts was removed and the depth charge stowage was reduced to only 35. The ships were fitted with a pair of depth charge rails and two throwers for the depth charges.

== Construction and career ==
Cheviot was ordered from Alexander Stephens & Sons and the ship was laid down on 27 April 1943 at its shipyard in Linthouse, launched on 2 May 1944 and was commissioned on 11 December 1945.

In 1946 Cheviot was assigned to the 1st Destroyer Squadron based at Malta. She saw service, along with other Royal Navy ships in preventing illegal immigration into Palestine in 1947. Her pennant number was also subsequently changed to D90 from R90. She returned to the UK in 1950. She was given an interim modernisation in 1954, which saw her 'X' turret at the rear of the ship replaced by two Squid anti-submarine mortars.

Between December 1956 and October 1959 she saw service in the Far East, as part of the 8th Destroyer Squadron. Cheviot was decommissioned in March 1960. The ship was used as a target for homing torpedo trials. She was subsequently sold to Thos. W. Ward and arrived at their yard in Inverkeithing for scrapping on 22 October 1962.

== Bibliography ==
- Chesneau, Roger, ed. (1980). Conway's All the World's Fighting Ships 1922–1946. Greenwich, UK: Conway Maritime Press. ISBN 0-85177-146-7.
- Colledge, J. J.; Warlow, Ben (2006) [1969]. Ships of the Royal Navy: The Complete Record of All Fighting Ships of the Royal Navy from the 15th Century to the Present (3rd Rev ed.). London: Chatham Publishing. ISBN 978-1-86176-281-8. OCLC 67375475.
- English, John (2001). Obdurate to Daring: British Fleet Destroyers 1941–45. Windsor, UK: World Ship Society. ISBN 978-0-9560769-0-8.
- Friedman, Norman (2006). British Destroyers and Frigates, the Second World War and After. Annapolis, Maryland: Naval Institute Press. ISBN 1-86176-137-6.
- Lenton, H. T. (1998). British & Empire Warships of the Second World War. Annapolis, Maryland: Naval Institute Press. ISBN 1-55750-048-7.
- March, Edgar J. (1966). British Destroyers: A History of Development, 1892–1953; Drawn by Admiralty Permission From Official Records & Returns, Ships' Covers & Building Plans. London: Seeley Service. OCLC 164893555.
- Marriott, Leo (1989). Royal Navy Destroyers Since 1945. Ian Allan. ISBN 0-7110-1817-0.
- Whitley, M. J. (1988). Destroyers of World War Two: An International Encyclopedia. Annapolis, Maryland: Naval Institute Press. ISBN 0-87021-326-1.
