= SS Athena =

Greek Passenger Steamship

Athena was a 50 m-long (160 ft) passenger steamship built in 1893 at the Syros (later Neorion) Shipyards. It was the first metal steamship built at this shipyard, and it represented an example of the brief growth of Greek shipbuilding in the late 19th century, before its decline in the next decades. The ship was powered by a steam engine built by the Ifaistos machine works in Piraeus, the second largest machine builder in the country (after Basileiades) at the time; Ifaistos was founded by John McDowall, a Scottish entrepreneur who had worked in Greece and had obtained Greek citizenship, and was the main builder of ship steam engines in Greece. This ship (renamed Rafiah) sank in 1946 in a tragic accident off the Greek island of Syrna that claimed the lives of Jewish refugees.
