= HMS Whaddon =

Destroyer of the Royal Navy

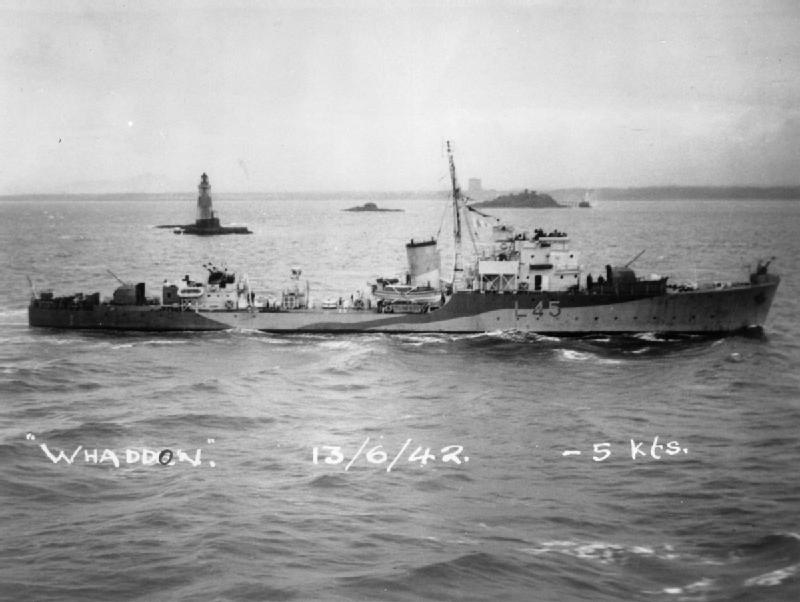
- Whaddon, 19 June 1942

History

United Kingdom
- Name: HMS Whaddon
- Ordered: 11 April 1939
- Builder: Alexander Stephen & Sons, Linthouse, Govan
- Yard number: Admiralty Job No.1472
- Laid down: 27 July 1939
- Launched: 16 July 1940
- Commissioned: 28 February 1941
- Identification: Pennant number: L45
- Honours and awards: North Sea 1941-43; Sicily 1943; Salerno 1943; Mediterranean 1943; South France 1944; Aegean 1944; Adriatic 1944
- Fate: Scrapped in April 1959

General characteristics
- Class & type: Type I Hunt-class destroyer
- Displacement: 1,000 long tons (1,016 t) standard; 1,340 long tons (1,362 t) full load
- Length: 85 m (278 ft 10 in) o/a
- Beam: 8.8 m (28 ft 10 in)
- Draught: 3.27 m (10 ft 9 in)
- Propulsion: 2 Admiralty 3-drum boilers; 2 shaft Parsons geared turbines, 19,000 shp
- Speed: 27.5 knots (31.6 mph; 50.9 km/h); 26 kn (30 mph; 48 km/h) full
- Range: 3,500 nmi (6,500 km) at 15 kn (28 km/h); 1,000 nmi (1,900 km) at 26 kn (48 km/h)
- Complement: 146
- Armament: 4 × QF 4 in Mark XVI on twin mounts Mk. XIX; 4 × QF 2 pdr Mk. VIII on quad mount MK.VII; 2 × 20 mm Oerlikons on single mounts P Mk. III; 40 depth charges, 2 throwers, 1 rack

HMS Whaddon (L45) was a Type I Hunt-class destroyer of the Royal Navy built by Alexander Stephen & Sons of Linthouse, Govan and launched on 16 July 1940. She was laid down on 27 July 1939 and commissioned 28 February 1941. She was adopted by the civil community of Newport Pagnell in Buckinghamshire, as part of the Warship Week campaign in 1942.

== Design ==
The Hunt-class was meant to fill the Royal Navy's need for a large number of small destroyer-type vessels capable of both convoy escort and operations with the fleet, and were designed with a heavy anti-aircraft armament of six 4-inch anti-aircraft guns and a speed of 29 knots (33 mph; 54 km/h). An error during design, which was only discovered once the first ship of the class Atherstone was built, meant that the ships as designed were dangerously unstable. To restore stability, the first 23 Hunts, including Whaddon, were modified during construction by removing a twin 4-inch mount, cutting down the ships' superstructure and adding ballast. These ships were known as Type I Hunts. Later ships in the class had their beam increased, which allowed them to carry the originally intended armament, and were known as Type II Hunts.

The type I Hunts were 264 feet 3 inches (80.54 m) long between perpendiculars and 280 feet (85.34 m) overall. The ship's beam was 29 feet 0 inches (8.84 m) and draught 7 feet 9 inches (2.36 m). Displacement was 1,000 long tons (1,000 t) standard and 1,360 long tons (1,380 t) under full load. Two Admiralty boilers raising steam at 300 pounds per square inch (2,100 kPa) and 620 °F (327 °C) fed Parsons single-reduction geared steam turbines that drove two propeller shafts, generating 19,000 shaft horsepower (14,000 kW) at 380 rpm. This gave a speed of 27.5 knots (50.9 km/h; 31.6 mph).

The ship's main gun armament was four 4 inch (102 mm) QF Mk XVI dual purpose (anti-ship and anti-aircraft) guns in two twin mounts, with one mount forward and one aft. Additional close-in anti-aircraft armament was provided by a quadruple 2-pounder "pom-pom" mount. Type I Hunts were later modified by adding two single Oerlikon 20 mm cannon on the bridge wings. Up to 40 depth charges could be carried. The ship had a complement of 146 officers and men.

== Construction ==
Whaddon was ordered on 11 April 1939, as part of the second batch of ten Hunts authorised under the 1939 Royal Navy construction programme. The ship was laid down at Alexander Stephen and Sons' Linthouse, Govan shipyard on 27 July 1939, with the yard number 572. The destroyer was launched on 16 July 1940 and completed on 28 February 1941. Whaddon, named for the Fox hunt based at the Buckinghamshire village of the same name, was the first ship of that name to serve with the Royal Navy. She was allocated the pennant number L45.

== Service history ==
Following commissioning, Whaddon joined the Rosyth Escort Force, where she was employed as a convoy escort in the North Sea, continuing with these operations for the rest of 1941 and throughout 1942. On 8 May 1941, Whaddon was alongside at Kingston upon Hull when she was near missed by a bomb during a German air raid, sustaining minor splinter damage.

Whaddon was then allocated to the Mediterranean Fleet in March 1943, joining the 60th Destroyer Flotilla where she undertook escort and patrol duties. In June 1943, Whaddon took part in Operation Corkscrew, the bombardment and invasion of the Italian island of Pantelleria. On 8 June, she took part in a bombardment of the island by a strong British naval force consisting of the cruisers Aurora, Euryalus, Newfoundland, Orion and Penelope and the destroyers Jervis, Laforey, Loyal, Nubian, Tartar, Troubridge and Whaddon, and on the night of 10/11 June accompanied the invasion force to the island, which surrendered without a fight on 11 June. Whaddon took part in Operation Husky, the Allied invasion of Sicily, escorting an assault convoy that took part in the landings on 10 July, and in September 1943, took part in Operation Avalanche, the allied landings at Salerno.

In August 1944, Whaddon took part in Operation Dragoon, the invasion of the South of France, escorting a follow-up convoy from Naples that arrived at the beachhead on 15 August. In September 1944, Germany started to pull its forces out of Crete and German-occupied Islands in the Aegean Sea, while the British deployed a force of Escort Carriers and destroyers to disrupt the German evacuations. On the night of 21/22 September, Whaddon and Belvoir were patrolling the Strait of Otranto when they encountered three German torpedo boats TA37, TA38 and TA39, which were being sent from the Adriatic Sea to the Aegean to replace German losses. Whaddon and Belvoir opened fire, but the faster German torpedo boats managed to escape the British destroyers without damage. Whaddon was refitted at Alexandria in January–February 1945, and was then deployed in operations in the Adriatic until the end of the war in Europe.

On 29 September 1945 Whaddon sailed from Gibraltar to Devonport and was placed in reserve. The ship was towed from Devonport to Cardiff in 1954 and reduced to Extended Reserve (i.e. she was destored, partially de-equipped and not maintained). She was scrapped at Faslane from April 1959. She has since had a British Sea Cadet Corps unit named after it, T.S Whaddon, located in Milton Keynes.

== Bibliography ==
- Colledge, J. J.; Warlow, Ben (2006) [1969]. Ships of the Royal Navy: The Complete Record of All Fighting Ships of the Royal Navy from the 15th Century to the Present (3rd Rev ed.). London: Chatham Publishing. ISBN 978-1-86176-281-8. OCLC 67375475.
- Critchley, Mike (1982). British Warships Since 1945: Part 3: Destroyers. Liskeard, UK: Maritime Books. ISBN 0-9506323-9-2.
- English, John (1987). The Hunts: A history of the design, development and careers of the 86 destroyers of this class built for the Royal and Allied Navies during World War II. World Ship Society. ISBN 0-905617-44-4.
- Friedman, Norman (2008). British Destroyers and Frigates: The Second World War and After. Barnsley, UK: Seaforth Publishing. ISBN 978-1-84832-015-4.
- Gardiner, Robert; Chesneau, Roger, eds. (1980). Conway's All The World's Fighting Ships 1922–1946. London: Conway Maritime Press. ISBN 0-85177-146-7.
- H.M. Ships Damaged or Sunk by Enemy Action: 3rd. SEPT. 1939 to 2nd. SEPT. 1945. Admiralty. 1952.
- Lenton, H.T. (1970). Navies of the Second World War: British Fleet & Escort Destroyers Volume Two. London: Macdonald & Co. ISBN 0-356-03122-5.
- Manning, T. D.; Walker, C. F. (1959). British Warship Names. London: Putnam.
- O'Hara, Vincent P. (2011). The German Fleet at War, 1939–1945 (eBook ed.). Annapolis, Maryland, USA: Naval Institute Press. ISBN 978-1-61251-397-3.
- Rohwer, Jürgen; Hümmelchen, Gerhard (1992). Chronology of the War at Sea 1939–1945. London: Greenhill Books. ISBN 1-85367-117-7.
- Winser, John de S. (2002). British Invasion Fleets: The Mediterranean and beyond 1942–1945. Gravesend, UK: World Ship Society. ISBN 0-9543310-0-1.
