= Emerald (steam yacht) =

Turbine-powered steam yacht

History

United Kingdom
- Name: 1902: Emerald; 1913: Beryl
- Owner: 1903: Christopher Furness; 1913: James Burns; 1915: Ardrossan Dry Dock & Sb Co
- Port of registry: 1903: West Hartlepool; 1913: Glasgow
- Builder: A Stephen & Sons, Linthouse
- Yard number: 397
- Launched: 12 October 1902
- Completed: April 1903
- Identification: UK official number 115147; code letters TWNF
- Fate: gutted by fire, 1913

General characteristics
- Type: steam yacht
- Tonnage: 694 GRT, 472 NRT
- Length: 211.7 ft (64.5 m)
- Beam: 28.6 ft (8.7 m)
- Depth: 16.95 ft (5.17 m)
- Decks: 2
- Installed power: 1903: 230 NHP; 1909: 315 NHP
- Propulsion: 3 × screws; 1903: 3 × steam turbines; 1909: 2 × steam turbines; 1 × triple-expansion engine
- Sail plan: 2-masted schooner
- Speed: 13 knots (24 km/h)

Emerald was a steam yacht that was launched in Glasgow in 1902 for the shipbuilder, shipowner, and politician Sir Christopher Furness. She was an early example of a yacht powered by steam turbines. By 1909 she had been modified, with a triple-expansion engine replacing one of her turbines. In 1912 Christopher Furness died. James Burns, 3rd Baron Inverclyde acquired the yacht and renamed her Beryl. In 1913 she was gutted by fire. She was sold and converted into a coal hulk, and survived as such until at least 1917.

== Emerald ==
Alexander Stephen and Sons in Linthouse, Glasgow built Emerald as yard number 397. She was launched on 21 October 1902, and completed in April 1903. Her length was 211.7 ft (64.5 m), her beam was 28.6 ft (8.7 m), and her depth was 16.95 ft (5.17 m). Her tonnages were 694 GRT, 472 NRT, and 757 Thames Measurement. She had three screws, each driven by a Parsons steam turbine. The combined power of her three turbines was rated at 230 NHP, and gave her a speed of 13 knots (24 km/h). She had one funnel, two masts, and was rigged as a schooner. Emerald's first owner was Christopher Furness, who registered her in West Hartlepool. Her United Kingdom official number was 115147, and her code letters were TWNF.

== Reciprocating engine ==
By May 1909, J. Samuel White of Cowes had replaced the steam turbine on her middle propeller shaft with a three-cylinder triple-expansion engine. The combined power of her reciprocating and turbine engines was rated at 315 NHP.

== Beryl ==
Furness died in November 1912. Lord Inverclyde acquired Emerald, renamed her Beryl, and registered her in Glasgow. In December 1913 she was moored in Rosneath Bay. Five days before Christmas, she was burnt out by fire. The Glasgow Herald reported: "Fire broke out in the after peak, spreading so quickly through the inflammable interior that before any substantial help could be brought to the scene, the vessel was a mass of flames, and practically beyond hope of saving." It was alleged that suffragettes caused the fire by arson. However, no evidence was presented, and no-one was charged with any offence.

By 1915 the Ardrossan Dry Dock and Shipbuilding Company had acquired Beryl. She was used as a coal hulk at Gare Loch. The Ardrossan Company was still registered as her owner in 1917.

== See also ==
- TS Vanadis – another steam yacht whose middle turbine was replaced with a triple expansion engine

== Bibliography ==
- Mercantile Navy List. London. 1904 – via Crew List Index Project.
- Mercantile Navy List. London. 1915 – via Crew List Index Project.
- Mercantile Navy List. London. 1917 – via Crew List Index Project.
- Register of Yachts. London: Lloyd's Register of Shipping. 1909 – via Internet Archive.
- Register of Yachts. London: Lloyd's Register of Shipping. 1913 – via Internet Archive.
- Yacht Register. London: Lloyd's Register of Shipping. 1904 – via Internet Archive.
