= HMS Sunderland =

Two ships of the Royal Navy have borne the name HMS Sunderland, after the English city of Sunderland, whilst another was planned:

- HMS Sunderland (1694) was a 60-gun fourth rate launched in 1694, hulked in 1715 and sunk as a foundation in 1737.
- HMS Sunderland (1724) was a 60-gun fourth rate launched 1724 and rebuilt in 1744. She foundered in 1761.
- HMS Sunderland was to have been a Bangor-class minesweeper. She was renamed HMS Lyme Regis before her launch in 1943 and was sold in 1948.
