= Rover (yacht) =

Steam-powered yacht built by Alexander Stephen and Sons

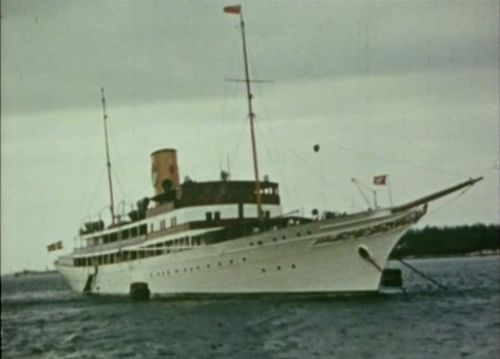

History

United Kingdom
- Name: Rover
- Builder: A Stephen & Sons, Linthouse
- Renamed: Southern Cross, Orizaba (1939)
- Fate: Scrapped c. 1960

General characteristics
- Type: Steam yacht
- Tonnage: 2,115 Thames Measurement
- Length: 266 ft 5 in (81.20 m)
- Beam: 40 ft 4 in (12.3 m)
- Draught: 20 ft (6.1 m)
- Installed power: 3,000 shp (2,200 kW)
- Propulsion: 2 × four crank triple expansion engines.; 3 × 60-kilowatt (80 hp) turbo-generators
- Speed: 16 knots (30 km/h)

Rover (later renamed Southern Cross, Orizaba) was a steam yacht built in 1930 by Alexander Stephen and Sons in Linthouse, Glasgow, Scotland for Lord Inchcape, then chairman of the P&O. Built as yard number 527, she was 265 feet 5 inches (80.90 m) long with a beam of 40 feet 1 inch (12.22 m) and a tonnage of 2,115, and was considered "the most luxurious ever built on the Clyde".

== Description ==
The yacht's figurehead was a likeness of Lord Inchcape's daughter, Elsie Mackay, who disappeared while trying to fly the Atlantic in 1928. With accommodation for up to 14 guests, the yacht was painted green and white at launch with a predominantly silver-coloured dining room.

Rover's staterooms featured en-suite marbled bathrooms. Dancing and games were staged on the open decks. Long-distance fuel tanks permitted long round-the-world voyages. In Cowes Week in August 1930, she was visited by the then King George V and Queen Mary.

== Later career ==
After Lord Inchcape's death aboard Rover in Monte Carlo's Port Hercules harbour on 23 May 1932, rumours circulated that the Aga Khan would buy the yacht, while a rumoured deal with King Carol II of Romania also fell through. However, a year later she was bought, unseen, by US businessman Howard Hughes, and renamed Southern Cross. She was subsequently sold to Swedish entrepreneur Axel Wenner-Gren, under whose ownership she helped rescue survivors from the SS Athenia, the first ship to be sunk by Nazi Germany in World War II.

The vessel subsequently served in the Mexican Navy as Orizaba until she was scrapped around 1960.
