= Alexander Stephen and Sons =

Former shipbuilding company in Glasgow, Scotland

- Type: Private
- Industry: Shipbuilding & Engineering
- Founded: 1750
- Defunct: 1982
- Fate: Liquidated
- Headquarters: Linthouse, Glasgow, Scotland

Alexander Stephen and Sons Limited, often referred to simply as Alex Stephens or just Stephens, was a Scottish shipbuilding company based in Linthouse, Glasgow, on the River Clyde and, initially, on the east coast of Scotland.

== History ==
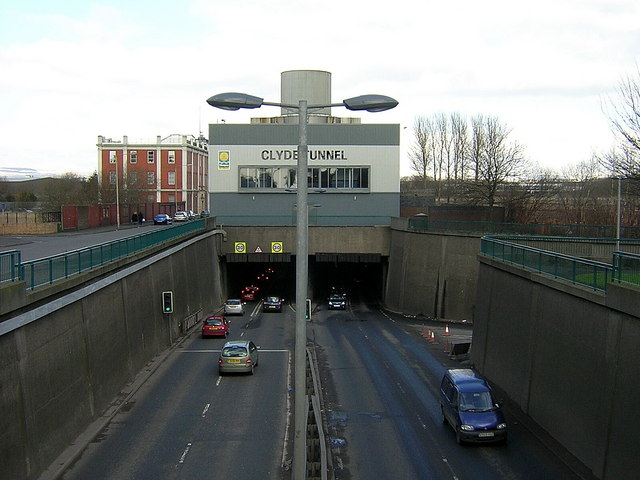
The red brick former offices of Alexander Stephen and Sons are situated on Holmfauld Road adjacent to the Clyde Tunnel and are now commercial office space.

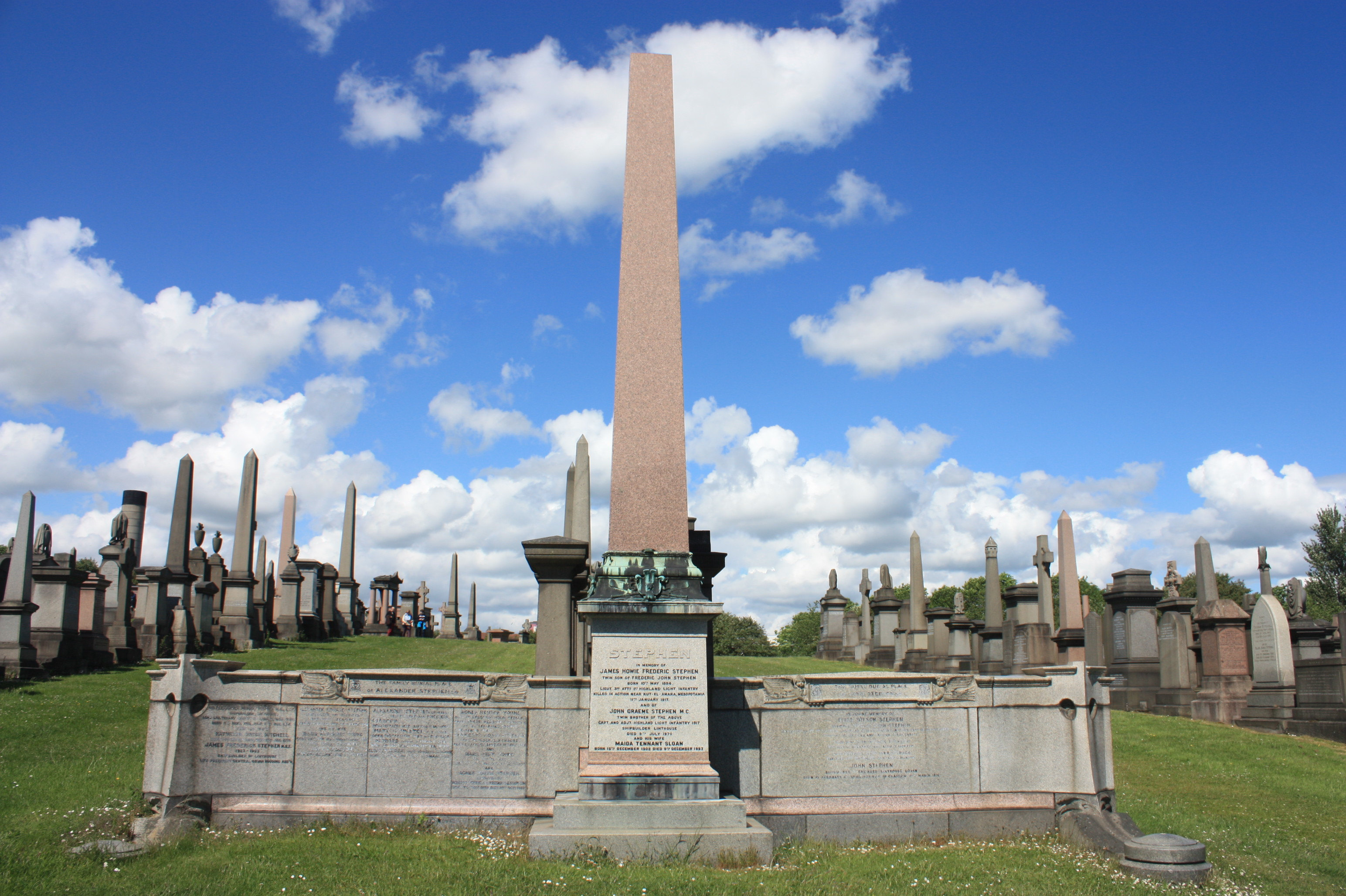
The grave of Alexander Stephen of Kelly (1832–1899) and John Stephen (1835–1916) and their families, Glasgow Necropolis

The company's roots can be found in Alexander Stephen (1722–1793) who began shipbuilding at Burghead on the Moray Firth in 1750.

In 1793 William Stephen (1759–1838), a descendant of his, established a firm of shipbuilders at Footdee in Aberdeen.

In 1813 another member of the family, again called William (1789–1829), commenced shipbuilding at Arbroath.

Alexander Stephen (1795–1875), a member of the third generation of the family, merged the Aberdeen and Arbroath businesses in 1828 and then, after closing the Aberdeen yard in 1829, moved production to the Panmure yard in Dundee in 1842. In 1850 Alexander Stephen arranged a lease of the Kelvinhaugh yard in Glasgow from Robert Black for twenty years from May, 1851. The site of the Kelvinhaugh yard is now Yorkhill Quay. The Arbroath yard finally closed in 1857. Due to the restrictions in size of the Kelvinhaugh yard, as well as the impending expiry of the lease, in 1870 the Glasgow business moved to a new site at Linthouse. The Dundee shipyard was sold to the Dundee Shipbuilders Company in 1893.

In a tragic disaster in 1883, Daphne, a steamship, capsized after its launch from the Linthouse yard, and 124 workers lost their lives.

In 1968, Stephens was incorporated into Upper Clyde Shipbuilders and was closed after the latter organisation collapsed in 1971. The engineering and ship repair elements of Alexander Stephen & Sons were not part of the UCS merger and continued until 1976, with the Company eventually wound up in 1982, when the shareholders were repaid.

The ship repair business was based at the Govan Graving Docks, which had been purchased from the Clyde Port Authority in 1967.

There is no knowledge of the earliest ships built, but the last 153 which were built on the East Coast are recorded. On the Clyde the firm built 697 ships, 147 at the Kelvinhaugh shipyard and the remainder at Linthouse.

It was at Stephens shipyard that Billy Connolly served his apprenticeship as a boilermaker. In 1992, he returned to the site of the now-demolished shipyard he worked at 35 years earlier. "What an extraordinary feeling. I spent a great deal of my life in here. From age 16 to... well, I started at 15. I started my apprenticeship at 16 and finished when I was 21. Stayed till I was 22, and moved along. I finished welding when I was 24. When I came here, as an apprentice, there was six ships being built, right where I'm standing. It was an extraordinary place. A hive of activity. Welders, caulkers, platers, burners, joiners, engineers, electricians. I learned how men talked to one another, and how merciless Glasgow humour can be. It has made an indelible mark on me." His foreman was Sammy Boyd, but the two biggest influences on him, according to the book written by his wife Pamela, were Jimmy Lucas and Bobby Dalgleish. Jimmy was one of Billy's trainers in the yard who helped him to hone his skills as a welder and a comedian.

Part of the site is now occupied by a Thales Optronics facility, with the former main office building converted into lettable office space by Govan Workspace, called Alexander Stephen House. The A-listed former Engine Shop was salvaged by the Scottish Maritime Museum in 1991 and rebuilt at its site in Irvine.

== Ships built by Alexander Stephen and Sons ==
University of Glasgow Archives hold a number of separately catalogued records collections for various Clyde shipbuilding firms associated with the name Alexander Stephen. For ship's plans, two of the larger holdings are "Collection of miscellaneous ship plans built on the river Clyde, Glasgow, Scotland" (gb 248 GB 248 UGD 130/5) and "Records of Upper Clyde Shipbuilders Ltd, Linthouse Division, shipbuilders Glasgow, Scotland" (gb 248 GB 248 UGD 349). However the cataloging does not list names of individual ships. Cataloguing is accessed via a link from the GLA home page, directly from the GLA search page.

The table below provides basic details of ships from 1940, and it will be expanded to include other ships. Further lists of ships built by the firm can be found at the "Maritime History Virtual Archives": Arbroath yard list 1830-1843, Dundee yard list 1844-1893, Linthouse yard-list 1870-1893.

Yard number	Type of ship	Name	Launched
42	Passenger cargo ship / Commerce raider	CSS Shenandoah	1863
56	Barquentine-rigged steam cutter	Bear	1874
83	composite barque	Fusi Yama	1865
215	Iron barque	Mabel Young	1877 Iron Barque "South Esk"
250	Cargo steamship	Alverton	1880
303	Four-masted iron barque	Bracadale	1887
394	Passenger cargo liner	Burutu	1902
397	Steam yacht	Emerald	1902
401	Passenger cargo ship	Miltiades	1903
402	Passenger cargo ship	Marathon	1904
408	Steam yacht	Medea	1904
509	Tug	Forceful	1925
519	Passenger liner	RMS Viceroy of India	1929
529	Passenger liner	Kenya	1930
527	Steam yacht	Rover	1930
540	Passenger cargo ship	Manoora	1935
543	Passenger cargo ship	Taroona	1934
571	Hunt Class destroyer	HMS Tynedale	1940
572	Hunt Class destroyer	HMS Whaddon	1941
573	Fleet destroyer	HMS Matchless	1942
574	Fleet destroyer	HMS Meteor	1942
575	Refrigerated cargo ship	Gloucester	1941
576	Refrigerated cargo ship	Nottingham	1941
577	Hunt Class destroyer	HMS Croome	1941
578	Hunt Class destroyer	HMS Dulverton	1941
579	Hunt Class destroyer	HMS Blackmore	1942
580	Hunt Class destroyer	HMS Bramham	1942
581	Bangor class minesweeper	HMS Poole	1941
582	Bangor class minesweeper	HMS Lyme Regis	1942
583–586	4 Landing Craft Mechanised		1940
587–588	2 Tank Landing Craft		1940
589	Hunt Class destroyer	HMS Holcombe	1942
590	Hunt Class destroyer	HMS Limbourne	1942
591	Fast minelayer	HMS Ariadne	1943
592	Refrigerated cargo ship	Papanui	1943
593	Refrigerated cargo ship	Paparoa	1943
594	Sloop	HMS Amethyst	1943
595	Sloop	HMS Hart	1943
596	Cruiser	unnamed	cancelled
597	Refrigerated cargo ship	Pipiriki	1944
598	Light aircraft carrier	HMS Ocean	1945
599	Fleet destroyer	HMS Chevron	1945
600	Fleet destroyer	HMS Cheviot	1945
601	Fleet destroyer	HMS Consort	1946
602	Refrigerated cargo ship	Devon	1946
603	Fleet destroyer	HMS Dunkirk	1946
604	Fleet destroyer	HMS Jutland	1947
605	Fleet destroyer	HMS St Lucia	cancelled
606	Landing Ship Tank	HMS LST 3028	1945
607	Landing Ship Tank	HMS LST 3029	1945
608	Cargo ship	Somerset	1946
609	Fleet destroyer	HMS Defender	1950
610	Passenger refrigerated cargo ship	Matina	1946
611	Passenger cargo ship	Kampala	1947
612	Cargo ship	Huntingdon	1947
613	Cargo ship	Komata	1946
614	Cargo ship	Cumberland	1948
615	Cargo ship	Koromiko	1947
616	Passenger cargo ship	Karanja	1948
617	Cargo ship	Kaitoke	1948
618	Passenger cargo ship	Golfito	1949
619	Refrigerated cargo ship	Fort Richepanse	1948
620	Passenger cargo ship	Fort Dauphin	1949
621	Refrigerated cargo liner	Dorset	1949
622	Cargo ship	Rio Bermejo	1950
623	Cargo ship	Dunedin Star	1950
624	Cargo ship	Kawaroa	1950
625	Cargo ship	City of Bedford	1950
626	Cargo ship	City of Singapore	1950
627	Cargo ship	Cornwall	1951
629	Passenger ship	Aureol	1951
630	Cargo ship	Surrey	1951
631	Cargo ship	Middlesex	1952
632	Cargo ship	Kurutai	1952
633	Cargo ship	Enton	1952
634	Cargo ship	Kowhai	1952
635	Cargo ship	Waimea	1953
636	Passenger ship	Olympia	1953
637	Cargo ship	Patonga	1953
638	Frigate	HMS Murray	1952
639	Frigate	HMS Palliser	1956
640	Refrigerated cargo ship	Whakatane	1954
641	Cargo ship	Ballarat	1954
642	Cargo ship	Bendigo	1954
643	Passenger ship	Irma	1954
644	Passenger ship	Fernvalley	1954
645	Passenger cargo ship	Castilian	1955
646	Passenger ship	Princess of Vancouver	1955
648	Cargo ship	Kaimiro	1956
649	Passenger cargo ship	Camito	1956
650	Cargo ship	City of Melbourne	1959
651	Cargo ship	City of Newcastle	1955
652	Passenger cargo ship	Crux	1956
653	Cargo ship	Kaituna	1956
654	Cargo ship	Koranui	1956
655	Frigate	INS Kirpan	1958
656	Cargo ship	Donegal	1956
657	Passenger refrigerated cargo ship	Changuinola	1957
658	Passenger refrigerated cargo ship	Chirripo	1957
659	Passenger refrigerated cargo ship	Chicanoa	1957
660	Cargo ship	Koraki	1957
661	Cargo ship	Katea	1958
662	Passenger cargo ship	Chatham	1959
663	Passenger cargo ship	Risdon	1959
664	Tanker	British Fulmar	1958
665	Cargo ship	Waikare	1958
666	Frigate	HMS Lowestoft	1959
667	Tanker	Mobil Acme	1959
668	Tanker	Mobil Apex	1960
669	Frigate	SAS President Steyn	1961
671	Cargo ship	Iberic	1960
672	Tanker	British Bombardier	1962
673	Cargo ship	Antrim	1962
674	Frigate	HMS Zulu	1962
675	Passenger refrigerated cargo ship	Chuscal	1960
676	Refrigerated cargo ship	Piako	1961
677	Passenger cargo ship	Dumurra	1961
678	Passenger cargo ship	Markhor	1962
679	Passenger Cargo ship	Mahout	1963
680	Passenger ship	Avalon	1963
681	Frigate	Phoebe	1964
682	Dredger	Skitter Ness	1963
683	Dredger	Bangka 1	1965
684	Passenger cargo ship	Zealandic	1964
685	Cargo ship	MV Melbrook	1964
686	Dredger	de Severodvinski	1965
687	Dredger	de Onezhskiy	1965
688	Dredger	de Arabatski	1966
689	Dredger	Nassau Bay	1966
690	Royal Fleet Auxiliary logistics ship	RFA Sir Galahad	1966
691	Royal Fleet Auxiliary logistics ship	RFA Sir Geraint	1967
692	Dredger	Nikarshaka	1967
693		Sewait	1967
694		Sahayak	1967
695	Refrigerated cargo ship	Majestic	1966
696	Refrigerated cargo ship	Britannic	1967
697	Frigate	HMS Hermione	1967
698	Dredger	Ribbok	1967
700	Refrigerated cargo ship	Port Chalmers	1967
701	Refrigerated cargo ship	Port Caroline	1968

- Aircraft carrier
  - HMS Ocean
- Cruisers
  - CSS Shenandoah Launched as Sea King 1863 Extreme Tea Clipper, Renamed CSS Shenandoah 1864 as a Confederate Cruiser Commerce Raider.
  - HMS Ceylon
  - HMS Hermione
  - HMS Kenya
- Destroyers
  - HMS Noble
  - HMS Nizam
  - HMS Nomad
  - HMS Nonpareil
  - HMS Prince
  - HMS Pylades
  - HMS Sturgeon
  - HMS Sceptre
  - HMS Tormentor
  - HMS Tornado
  - HMS Vesper
  - HMS Vidette
  - HMS Voyager
  - HMS Sabre
  - HMS Saladin
  - HMS Sardonyx
  - HMS Saturn – cancelled
  - HMS Sycamore – cancelled
  - HMS Gallant
  - HMS Grenade
  - HMS Zulu
  - HMS Sikh
  - HMS Matchless
  - HMS Meteor
  - HMS Chevron
  - HMS Cheviot
  - HMS Consort
  - HMS Dunkirk
  - HMS Jutland
  - HMS St Lucia – cancelled and broken up on slipway.
  - HMS Defender
- Hunt-class destroyers
  - HMS Tynedale
  - HMS Whaddon
  - HMS Croome
  - HMS Dulverton
  - HMS Blackmore
  - HMS Bramham
  - HMS Holcombe
  - HMS Limbourne
- Frigates
  - HMS Hermione
  - HMS Zulu

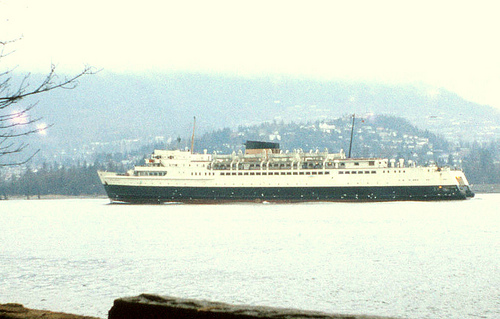
Princess of Vancouver, launched 1955

- Minelayers
  - HMS Manxman
  - HMS Ariadne
- Sloops
  - HMS Amethyst
  - HMS Hart
- Auxiliaries
  - RFA Abadol
  - RFA Sir Galahad
- Yachts
  - Emerald
  - Medea
  - Rover
- Liners
  - MV Aureol
  - California
  - SS Mulbera
  - RMS Port Kingston (1904), renamed RMS Tahiti
  - Regal Empress
  - Hollandia 1909, later renamed Hammonia
  - RMS Viceroy of India
  - Tubantia
  - Wardha
  - Pisa
- Barques
  - Fusi Yama
  - Bear
  - Bracadale
  - Mabel Young
