= HMS Zulu =

Three ships of the British Royal Navy have borne the name HMS Zulu, after the African Zulu people:

- HMS Zulu (1909), a 1905 Tribal-class (or F-class) destroyer that served in World War I
- HMS Zulu (F18), launched in 1937, a 1936 Tribal-class destroyer that served in World War II
- HMS Zulu (F124), launched in 1962, a Tribal-class frigate
