= SS Marathon =

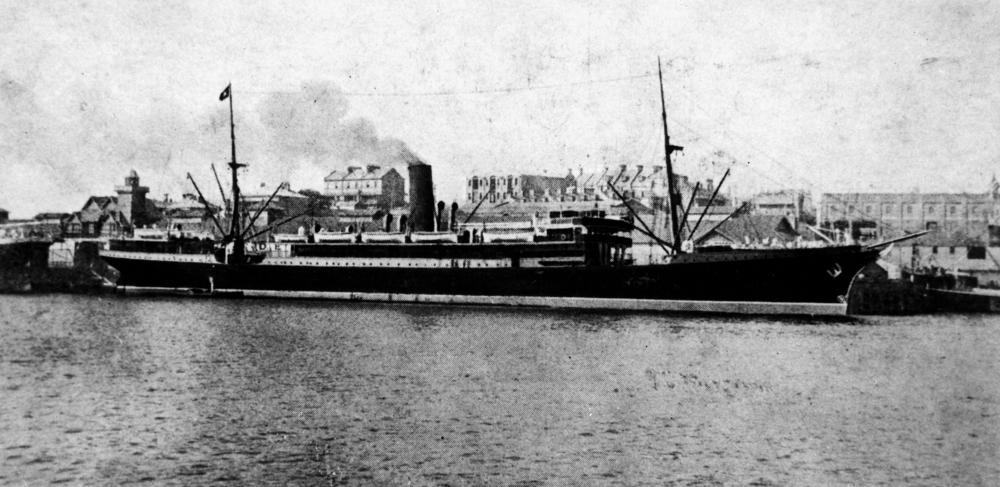
- Marathon prior to 1912, at harbour

History

United Kingdom
- Name: Marathon (1904–1920); Oruba (1920–1925)
- Operator: Aberdeen Line (1904–1920); Royal Mail Steam Packet Company (1920–1921); Pacific Steam Navigation Company (1921–1924)
- Builder: Alexander Stephen and Sons
- Yard number: 402
- Launched: 18 November 1903
- Maiden voyage: 27 January 1904
- In service: 1904
- Out of service: 1923
- Fate: Scrapped in 1925

General characteristics
- Type: Cargo liner
- Tonnage: 6,765 GRT
- Length: 454.9 ft (138.7 m)
- Beam: 55.1 ft (16.8 m)
- Depth: 30 ft (9.1 m)
- Installed power: Two triple expansion steam reciprocating engines
- Propulsion: Two screws
- Speed: 15 knots (28 km/h; 17 mph)
- Capacity: 89 first class; 158 third class; 150 first class (from 1912); 170 third class (from 1912)
- Notes: Enlarged in 1912

SS Marathon was a passenger and cargo steamship built for the Aberdeen Line. She was involved in shipping between the United Kingdom and Australia for most of her career.

== Background ==
Marathon was built for the Aberdeen Line in 1903 in Scotland at Alexander Stephen and Sons, she had an identical older sister ship Miltiades. Both ships were built for the United Kingdom to Australia via South Africa route.

== Features ==
Marathon was measured at 6,765 gross register tons (GRT), and was 454.9 feet (138.7 m) long by 55.1 ft (16.8 m) wide.

She was a combined passenger and cargo ship, and her cargo holds were refrigerated for the transport of frozen food products from Australia to the United Kingdom. Her passenger accommodation was built to accommodate 89 passengers in first class, and 158 in third class.

Marathon and her sister were among the last ships of any size to be built with a clipper bow (or Aberdeen bow) which gave them a striking appearance.

== Career ==
Marathon set out on her maiden voyage from London on 27 January 1904, arriving at Sydney on 8 March.

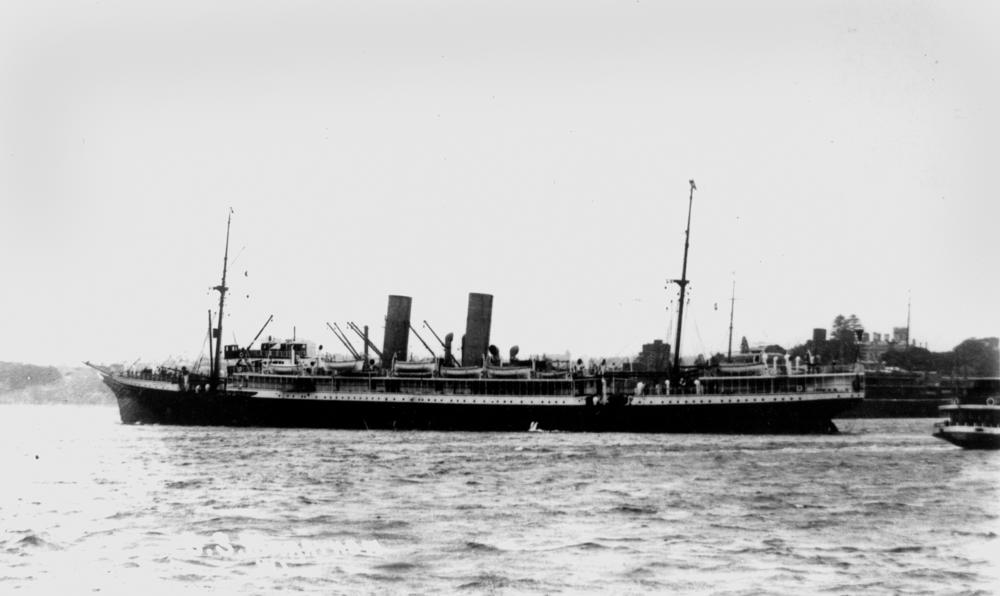
Marathon following her lengthening

In July 1912 Marathon was sent to the Alexander Stephen and Sons shipyard to be cut in half and then lengthened. When this work was completed in September, Marathon had gained a second funnel, and had been lengthened to 504.3 ft (153.7 m), with an increased tonnage of 7,814 GRT. She now had capacity for 150 first class passengers, and 170 passengers in third class.

In 1915 Marathon was requisitioned for use as a troopship for the duration of the First World War: she gained the designation HMAT (His Majesty's Australian Transport) A74. She transported countless Australian troops and medical staff from Australia to the UK for the war effort. After the war ended she was used to repatriate Australians back from Europe.

In 1920 Marathon and her sister Miltiades were purchased by the Royal Mail Steam Packet Company, Miltiades was renamed Orcana whilst Marathon was renamed Oruba. In 1921 she was transferred to the Pacific Steam Navigation Company, and put onto their "Round South America" service, that departed Liverpool, visited Montevideo, then Valparaíso, the Panama Canal then back to Liverpool. However, she was found to be too expensive to operate, and she was therefore laid up in 1922 at Liverpool, then Dartmouth, where she remained until she was sold for scrap to Schweitzer & Oppler of Berlin on September 19, 1924. She was taken Hamburg Germany where she was broken up in 1925.
