= MV Princess of Vancouver =

Ship built in 1955

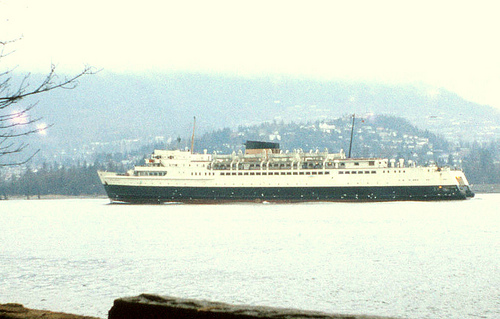

History
- Name: Princess of Vancouver (1955–1985); Princess of Vancouver Island (1985–1993); Nan Hai Ming Zhu (1993–2001); Pearl of South China Sea (2001–present)
- Owner: 1955–1981: Canadian Pacific Railway; 1981–1985: British Columbia Ministry of Transportation & Highways; 1985–1987: BC Ferries; 1987–1990: British Columbia Steamship Company; 1990–1993: Stena Line; 1993–2001: Kangda Shipping Company, China; 2001–present: Haveton Shipping, Hong Kong
- Operator: 1955–1981: Canadian Pacific Railway
- Port of registry: (Canada)
- Builder: Alexander Stephen & Sons
- Yard number: 646
- Launched: 7 March 1955
- Identification: IMO number: 5284998

General characteristics
- Tonnage: 5,554 GT
- Length: 416 ft (127 m)
- Beam: 66 ft (20 m)
- Draught: 15 ft (4.6 m)

Princess of Vancouver was a passenger vessel in the Pacific coastal service fleet of the Canadian Pacific Railway (CPR).

The ship was part of the CPR Princess fleet, which was composed of ships having names which began with the title "Princess".

== History ==
In 1955, Princess of Vancouver was added to the CPR fleet; and she would become the last remnant of the once famous coastal fleet in service. In 1981, sold to the BC Ministry of Transportation & Highways saltwater ferries. She was subsequently converted to a RORO ferry by Burrard Yarrows for $8,995,000 and in 1982 she was placed in service between Little River (Comox) and Powell River.

On 10 October 1985 she was registered as Princess of Vancouver Island for the British Columbia Ferry Corporation and operated between Comox, British Columbia and Powell River, British Columbia, and from 1987 between Seattle and Victoria as "Vancouver Island Princess". In 1989 she was added to the British Columbia Stena Line and used along on the Victoria to Seattle route along with the SS Princess Marguerite.

In 1993 she was sold to China and renamed Nan Hai Ming Zhu. In 2001 she was sold to Haveton Shipping, Hong Kong and renamed Pearl of South China Sea. In 2007 she was listed as in active service.

Princess of Vancouver pioneered a series of diesel engine innovations that made possible the use of heavy fuel oil in medium speed trunk piston engines.
