= MV Aureol =

- MV Aureol

History

United Kingdom
- Name: MV Aureol
- Owner: Elder Dempster Lines Ltd.
- Port of registry: Liverpool, UK
- Route: Liverpool-Las Palmas-Bathurst(Banjul)-Freetown-Monrovia-Tema-Apapa. From 1972-74 UK departure port Southampton.
- Builder: Alexander Stephen and Sons, Govan
- Yard number: 629
- Launched: 28 March 1951
- Completed: October 1951
- Maiden voyage: 3 November 1951
- Out of service: 18 October 1974
- Identification: IMO number: 5030878
- Fate: Sold, November 1974

Panama
- Name: M/V Marianna VI
- Owner: Yiannis Latsis
- Port of registry: Panama Panama
- Acquired: November 1974
- Fate: Laid up, February 1979; Scrapped, Alang, India, 2001

General characteristics
- Type: Passenger/cargo ocean liner
- Tonnage: 14,083 GRT; 7,689 NRT; 6,827 DWT
- Length: 537 ft (164 m)
- Beam: 70 ft (21 m)
- Draught: 25 ft (7.6 m)
- Installed power: 10,800bhp
- Propulsion: 2 × 4-cylinder Doxford diesel engines, 2 shafts
- Speed: 16 knots (30 km/h; 18 mph)
- Capacity: 329 passengers: 253 first class; 76 cabin class
- Crew: 145

MV Aureol was a mid-sized British ocean liner, originally put into service for Elder Dempster Lines of Liverpool in 1951. She was constructed on the River Clyde in Glasgow by Alexander Stephen and Sons. At 537 feet long and measuring 14,083 gross register tons, Aureol had room for 329 passengers and carried 145 crew. She spent her entire Elder Dempster career on the UK-Lagos passenger cargo service. From 1951 to 1972 she sailed from Liverpool, but closure of the landing stage and the hope of better loadings led to her being transferred to Southampton (first departure 26 April 1972) for the last two years of her service.

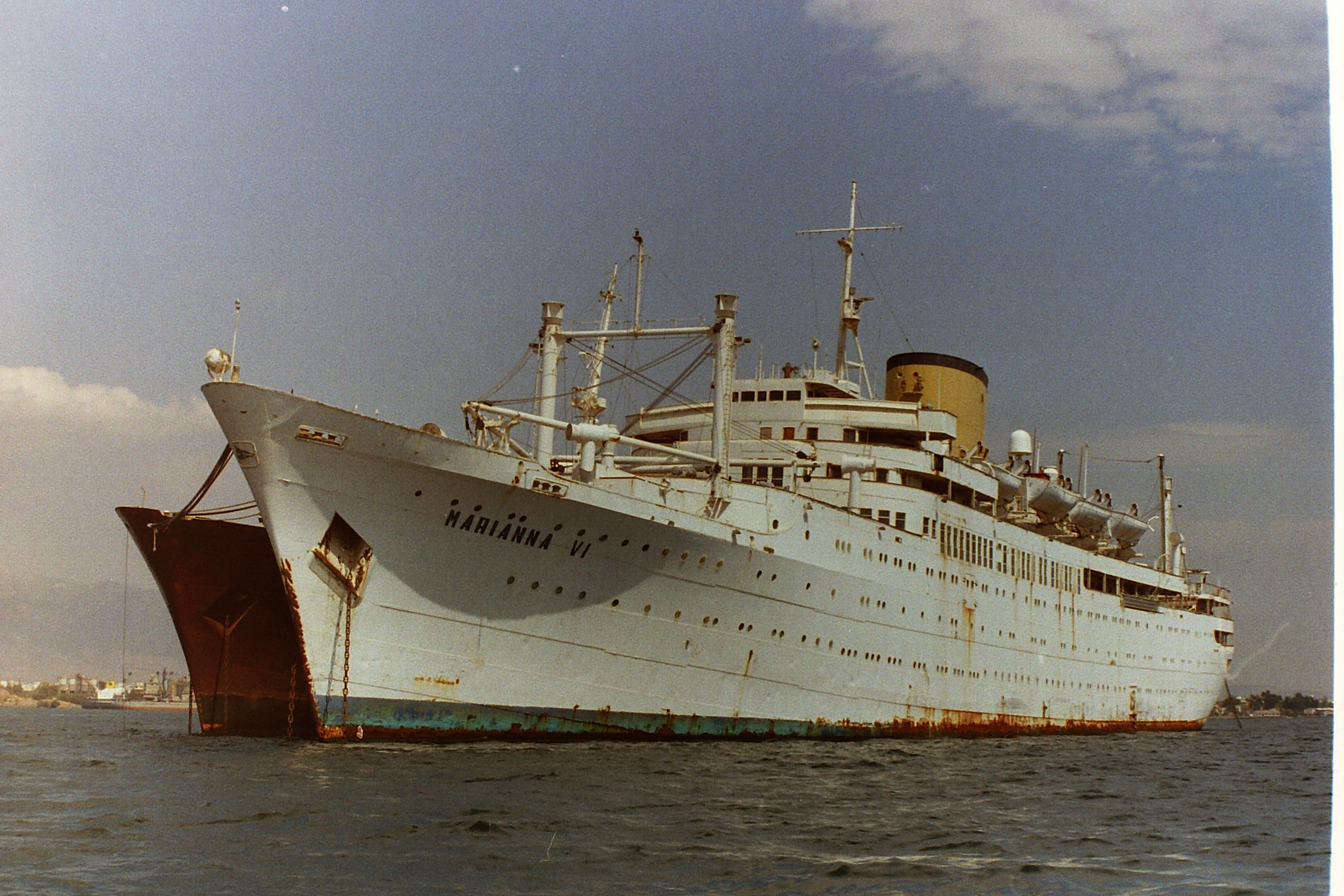
Marianna VI laid up in Eleusis, 2000

Aureol arrived at Southampton at the end of her final Elder Dempster voyage on 18 October 1974. She was purchased by Greek oil tycoon Yiannis Latsis, and renamed Marianna VI after one of his daughters. In 1989 she was laid up at Elefsina and did not sail again until 2001, when she moved to the Indian port of Alang to be beached and broken up for scrap.
