= Martha Christina Tiahahu =

Indonesian freedom fighter

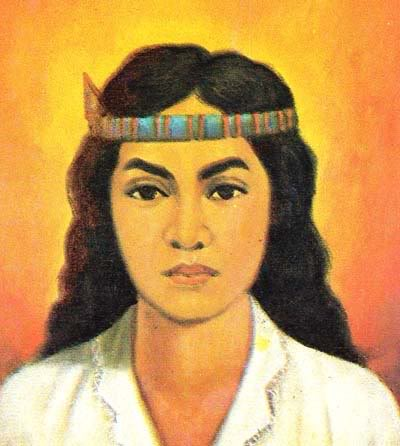
- Born: 4 January 1800; Santiago de Abúbu, Nusalaut Island, Dutch East Indies
- Died: 2 January 1818 (aged 17); Banda Sea
- Monuments: Statue in Ambon, Maluku; statue in Abubu
- Occupation: Guerrilla fighter
- Years active: 1817
- Parent(s): Paulus Tiahahu, Sina Tiahahu
- Awards: National Heroine of Indonesia

Martha Christina Tiahahu (4 January 1800 – 2 January 1818) was a Moluccan freedom fighter and National Heroine of Indonesia.

Born to a military captain, Tiahahu was active in military matters from a young age. She joined the war led by Pattimura against the Dutch colonial government when she was 17, fighting in several battles. After being captured in October 1817, she was released on account of her age. She continued to fight, and was captured again. Sent to Java to be a slave labourer, she fell ill on the way and, refusing to eat or take medicine, died on a ship in the Banda Sea.

Tiahahu is considered a National Heroine of Indonesia. She has also been honoured with two statues, one in Ambon and one in Abubu; other namesakes include a warship, street, Moluccan social organization, and women's magazine.

== Biography ==
Tiahahu was born in Santiago de Abúbu village on Nusalaut Island, in Maluku, on 4 January 1800. Her father was Captain Paulus Tiahahu of the Soa Uluputi clan. After her mother, Sina, died while she was an infant, Tiahahu was raised by her father. As a child, she was stubborn and followed her father wherever he went, at times joining him in planning attacks.

Beginning in 1817. Tiahahu joined her father in a guerrilla war against the Dutch colonial government. They also backed Pattimura's army. She saw several battles. In a battle at Saparua Island, the troops killed Dutch commander Richement and wounded his replacement Commander Meyer. In another battle, she and her troops succeeded in burning Duurstede Fortress to the ground. During battles, she was said to throw stones at the Dutch troops if her soldiers were out of ammunition, while other accounts have her wielding a spear. After Vermeulen Kringer took over the Dutch military in Maluku, Tiahahu, her father, and Pattimura were captured in October 1817.

Carried on the HNLMS Evertsen to Nusalaut, Tiahahu was the only captured soldier not punished; this was due to her young age. After a period of time in holding in Fort Beverwijk, where her father was executed, in late 1817 Tiahahu was released. She continued to fight against the Dutch.

In a sweep in December 1817, Tiahahu and several other former rebels were caught. The captured guerrillas were placed on the Evertsen to be transported to Java; they were meant to be used as slave labour on the coffee plantations there. However, on the way, Tiahahu fell ill. Refusing medication and food, she died on 2 January 1818, while the ship was crossing the Banda Sea; she received a burial at sea later that day.

== Historiography ==
Dutch military documents do not have any records of Tiahahu participating in battle. She was captured along with her father as a prisoner of war, not as a combatant. She shed no tears at her father's execution and died incidentally as she was being taken to Batavia for detention. However, in 1835-6, campaign leader Quirijn Maurits Rudolph Ver Huell published a memoir of his time as a colonial administrator which included an exaggerated account of Tiahahu, painting her with common colonialist tropes of the untamed Indian princess. Ver Huell described Tiahahu as a "young and beautiful Indian [sic] girl" with "long, raven black hair ... hanging down completely, in wavy braids down her back" and says that she "had not only carried the weapons of her aging father, but had also participated as a warrior in the cakalele, or war dance, and had excelled in courage and bloodthirstiness." In a 2018 monograph, Hans Straver observed that Ver Huell betrayed very basic misunderstandings of Pattimura's rebellion, including Pattimura's rank and Tiahahu's name, and shows no evidence of knowing any local language; he likely was repeating what he heard from other Dutch soldiers, further distorted by the loss of the original draft of his memoir in a shipwreck, which forced him to rewrite from memory. Period Dutch diaries speak of Tiahahu's "wild appearance," but Ver Huell is the only source to claim she fought in battle. Ver Huell's eroticized depiction of Tiahahu caught the imagination of the Dutch and for this reason he was compelled to invent further stories about her after his memoirs were published, causing her memory to be preserved in Dutch publications for many decades.

In the 1960s, Indonesia chose to make Tiahahu a national heroine, principally to appropriate the Moluccan independence struggle as their own and delegitimize the resistance movement of the Republic of South Maluku. Indonesian historian L.J.H. Zacharias was appointed to write an official history of Tiahahu. However, lacking reliable period sources, her depiction of Tiahahu can be traced back entirely to Ver Huell. There is no evidence that Zacharias or other Indonesian researchers located any surviving memories or traditions of Tiahahu from the Moluccans themselves.

== Legacy ==
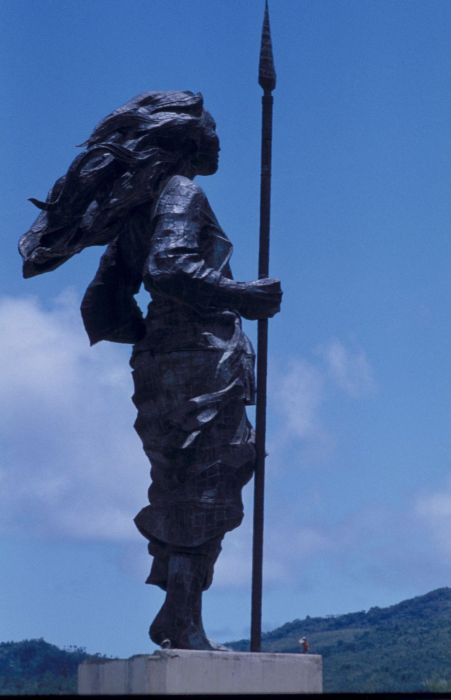
The statue to Tiahahu in Ambon

Soon after Indonesia's independence, Tiahahu was declared a National Heroine of Indonesia; 2 January was designated Martha Christina Tiahahu Day. On that day, people in Maluku spread flower petals over the Banda Sea in an official ceremony honouring her struggle. However, the ceremony is smaller than that honouring Pattimura, on 15 May.

Several monuments have been dedicated to Tiahahu. In Ambon, capital of the province of Maluku, an 8-metre (26 ft) tall statue of her holding a spear was erected in 1977; it stands in Karangpanjang overlooking the Banda Sea. In Abubu, a statue of her leading soldiers while holding a spear was erected and dedicated on the 190th anniversary of her death. She also has several items named after her, including a street in Karangpanjang, Ambon, a street (Martha C. Tiahahustraat) in Wierden (Overijssel, Netherlands) and a warship, the KRI Martha Christina Tiahahu.

Other organizations have also taken Tiahahu's name as a symbol of bravery and "spirit of struggle", including a social organization for Moluccans in Jakarta and a women's magazine in Ambon.
