= SS Miltiades =

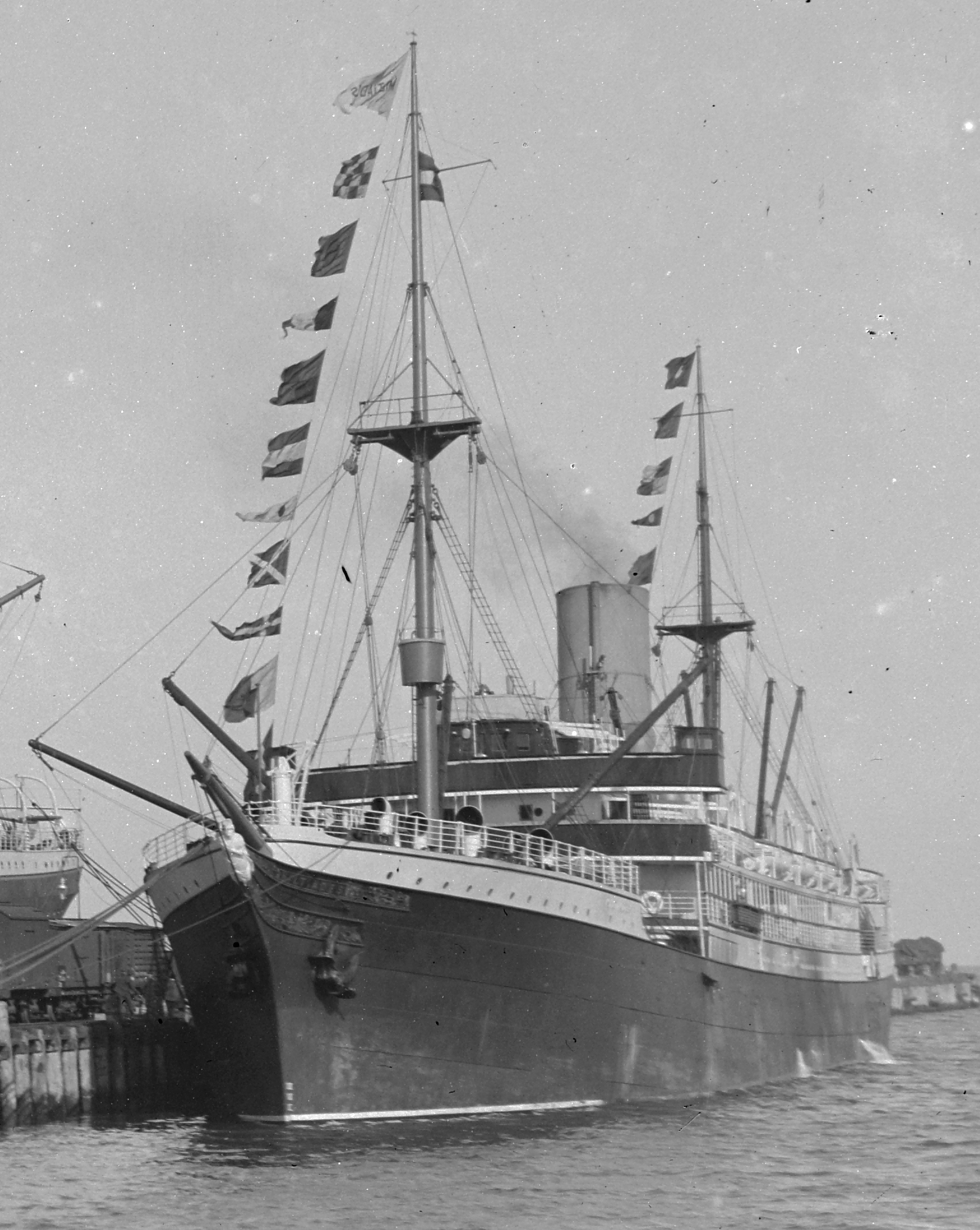
- Miltiades prior to 1913, at harbour

History

United Kingdom
- Name: Miltiades (1903–1920); Orcana (1920–1923)
- Operator: Aberdeen Line (1903–1920); Royal Mail Steam Packet Company (1920–1922); Pacific Steam Navigation Company (1922–1923)
- Builder: Alexander Stephen and Sons
- Yard number: 401
- Launched: 11 August 1903
- Maiden voyage: 3 November 1903
- In service: 1903
- Out of service: 1923
- Fate: Scrapped in 1923

General characteristics
- Type: Cargo liner
- Tonnage: 6,765 GRT
- Length: 454.9 ft (138.7 m)
- Beam: 55.1 ft (16.8 m)
- Depth: 30 ft (9.1 m)
- Installed power: Two triple expansion steam reciprocating engines
- Propulsion: Two screws
- Speed: 15 knots (28 km/h; 17 mph)
- Capacity: 89 first class; 158 third class; 150 first class (from 1913); 170 third class (from 1913)
- Notes: Enlarged in 1913

SS Miltiades was a passenger and cargo steamship built for the Aberdeen Line. She was involved in shipping between the United Kingdom and Australia for most of her career.

== Background ==
Miltiades was built for the Aberdeen Line in 1903 in Scotland at Alexander Stephen and Sons, she had an identical sister ship, Marathon, that was constructed after her. Both ships were built for the United Kingdom to Australia via South Africa route.

== Features ==
Miltiades was measured at 6,765 gross register tons (GRT), and was 454.9 feet (138.7 m) long by 55.1 ft (16.8 m) wide.

She was a combined passenger and cargo ship, and her cargo holds were refrigerated for the transport of frozen food products from Australia to the United Kingdom. Her passenger accommodation was built to accommodate 89 passengers in first class, and 158 in third class.

Miltiades and her sister were among the last ships of any size to be built with a clipper bow (or Aberdeen bow) which gave them a striking appearance.

== Career ==
Miltiades set out on her maiden voyage from London on 3 November 1903, arriving at Melbourne on 10 December. This set a new record for this route of 34 days and 16 hours.

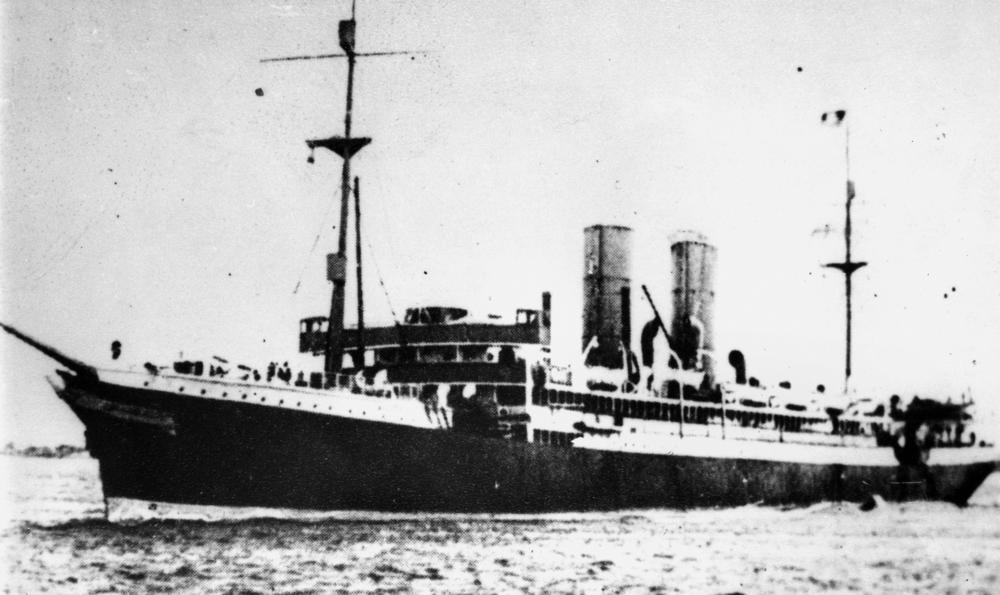
Miltiades following her lengthening

In September 1912 Miltiades followed her sister Marathon in going to the Alexander Stephen and Sons shipyard to be cut in half and then lengthened. When this work was completed in 1913, Miltiades had gained a second funnel, and had been lengthened to 504.3 ft (153.7 m), with an increased tonnage of 7,814 GRT. She now had capacity for 150 first class passengers, and 170 passengers in third class.

She arrived in Sydney on 18 September 1914, having departed London. From 1914 to 1920 Miltiades was requisitioned for use as a troopship for the duration of the First World War. She was initially hired, effective 21 September 1914, to convey "Imperial Reservists" of the British Army from Sydney to the British Isles, with the contract terminating on 3 January 1915. One of those men was Issy Smith, who embarked on 21 October 1914. On 8 November 1915, she was re-hired to transport Australian troops. She resumed commercial service on 4 June 1920.

In 1920 Miltiades and her sister were purchased by the Royal Mail Steam Packet Company, Miltiades was renamed Orcana whilst Marathon was renamed Oruba. In 1922 she was transferred to the Pacific Steam Navigation Company, and put onto their "Round South America" service, that departed Liverpool, visited Montevideo, then Valparaíso, the Panama Canal then back to Liverpool. However, after her very first voyage she was found to be too expensive to operate, and she was therefore laid up, firstly at Liverpool and then Dartmouth where she remained until she was sold for scrap to Arie Rijsdijk Boss & Zonen in 1923, who had her towed to the Netherlands to be broken up at Hendrik-ido-Ambracht in 1923.
