= HMS Dunkirk (D09) =

Battle-class destroyer

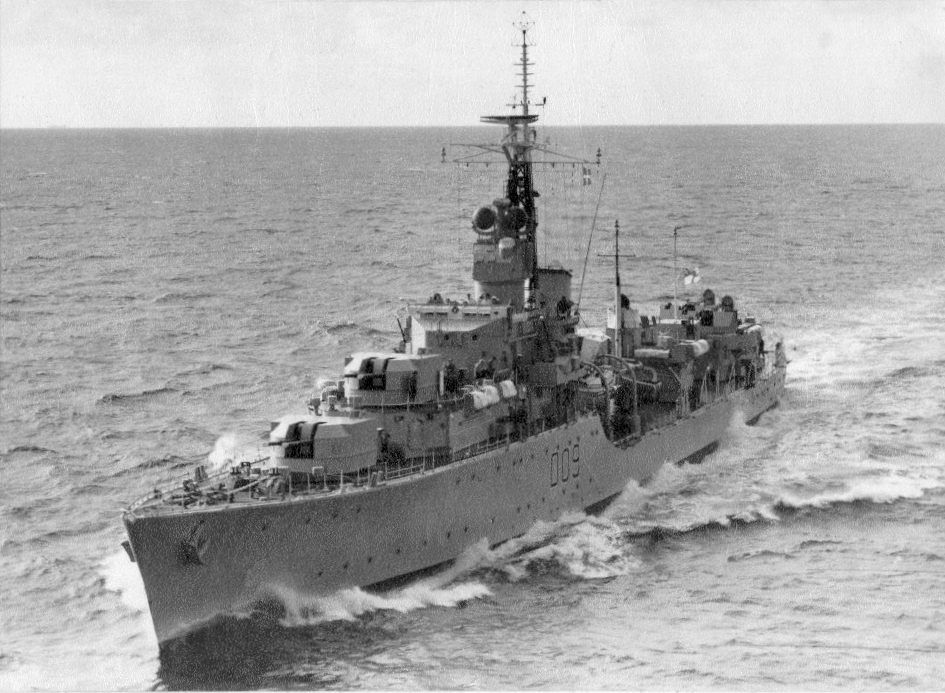

History

United Kingdom
- Name: HMS Dunkirk
- Ordered: 1943
- Builder: Alexander Stephen and Sons
- Laid down: 19 July 1944
- Launched: 27 August 1945
- Commissioned: 27 November 1946
- Decommissioned: 1963
- Fate: Broken up 1965

General characteristics
- Class & type: Battle-class destroyer
- Displacement: 2,480 tons standard
- Length: 379 ft (116 m)
- Beam: 40 ft 6 in (12.34 m)
- Draught: 12 ft 8 in (3.86 m) mean; 17 ft 6 in (5.33 m) maximum
- Propulsion: Oil fired, two three-drum boilers, Parsons geared turbines, twin propellers, 50,000 hp (37,000 kW)
- Speed: 35.75 knots (66.21 km/h)
- Complement: 268
- Armament: 5 × 4.5 in (114 mm) gun; 8 × Bofors 40 mm guns; 10 × 21 in (533 mm) torpedo tubes; 2 × Squid mortar

Service record
- Part of: 4th Destroyer Flotilla; 7th Destroyer Squadron

HMS Dunkirk (D09) was a later or 1943 Battle-class fleet destroyer of the British Royal Navy (RN). Though there were other ships of the Navy that had been named Dunkirk, as far back as the 1650s, it held added meaning after the evacuation from Dunkirk between late May and early June 1940, in which over 300,000 British, as well as French troops, were rescued by a ragtag fleet of ships.

Dunkirk was built by Alexander Stephen and Sons of Govan. She was launched on 27 August 1945 and commissioned on 27 November 1946.

== Service ==
In the year of her commissioning, Dunkirk joined the 4th Destroyer Flotilla of the Home Fleet. In 1950, Dunkirk was placed in Reserve, as were many of her sister ships in the 1950s. She subsequently performed a variety of duties and in 1958, while in the Mediterranean, Dunkirk, in broad daylight, was hit by her sister ship HMS Jutland during Officer of the Watch manoeuvres off Malta, causing minor damage.

In 1961, Dunkirk, along with the cruiser HMS Lion and the frigate HMS Leopard, undertook a tour of the South American continent. Instead of returning home to the UK from the deployment's culmination Dunkirk deployed to the Mediterranean to take up the duties of HMS Broadsword, a Weapon-class destroyer of the 7th Destroyer Squadron, based in the Mediterranean, which had experienced some engine problems and therefore had to be replaced. Dunkirk finally returned home in 1963.

== Decommissioning and disposal ==
In 1965 Dunkirk was listed as 'reserve' and later that year was scrapped at Faslane.

== Publications ==
- Colledge, J. J.; Warlow, Ben (2006) [1969]. Ships of the Royal Navy: The Complete Record of All Fighting Ships of the Royal Navy from the 15th Century to the Present (3rd Rev ed.). London: Chatham Publishing. ISBN 978-1-86176-281-8. OCLC 67375475.
- Hodges, Peter (1971). Battle Class Destroyers. London: Almark Publishing. ISBN 0-85524-012-1.
