= HMS Blackmore (L43) =

Destroyer of the Royal Navy

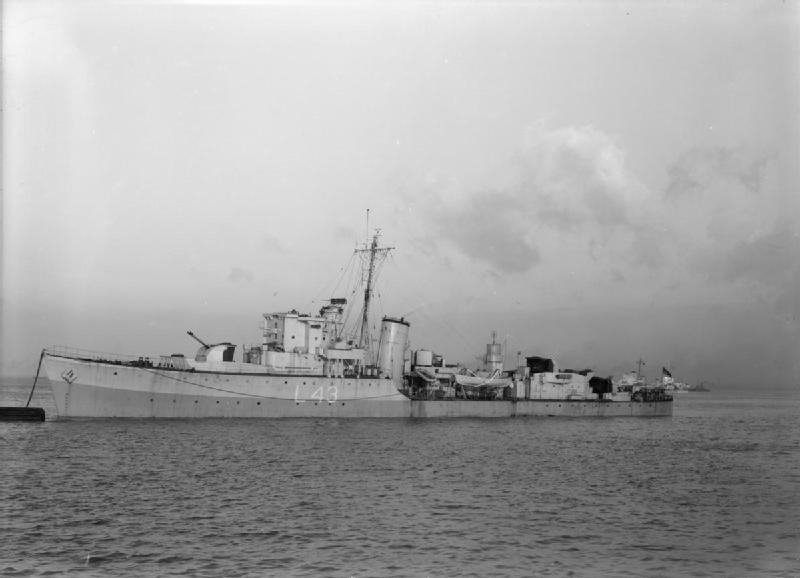
- HMS Blackmore, underway on the river Medway.

History

United Kingdom
- Name: HMS Blackmore
- Ordered: 20 December 1940
- Builder: A. Stephen & Sons Ltd. (Glasgow
- Laid down: 10 February 1940
- Launched: 2 December 1941
- Commissioned: 14 April 1942
- Identification: Pennant number: L43
- Honours and awards: Atlantic 1943; South France 1944; Salerno 1943; Adriatic 1944
- Fate: Sold to the Royal Danish Navy in 1954

Denmark
- Name: HDMS Esbern Snare
- Commissioned: 1954
- Decommissioned: 1965
- Identification: F341
- Fate: Scrapped in 1966

General characteristics
- Class & type: Type II Hunt-class destroyer
- Displacement: 1,050 tons standard; 1,490 tons full load
- Length: 85.34 m (280.0 ft)
- Beam: 9.62 m (31.6 ft)
- Draught: 2.51 m (8 ft 3 in)
- Propulsion: 2 shaft Parsons geared turbines; 19,000 shp
- Speed: 25.5 kn (47.2 km/h; 29.3 mph)
- Range: 3,600 nmi (6,670 km) at 14 knots (26 km/h)
- Complement: 164
- Armament: 6 × QF 4 in Mark XVI on twin mounts Mk. XIX; AAA - 2 × 4 12.7mm Vickers, 2 × 20 mm; 6 Thornycroft depth charge throwers

HMS Blackmore (pennant number L43) was an escort destroyer of the Type II Hunt class. The Royal Navy ordered Blackmore's construction three months after the outbreak of the Second World War. A. Stephen & Sons laid down her keel at their Glasgow yard on 10 February 1941, as Admiralty Job Number J1479. The ship was adopted by the civil community of Langport, Somerset after a successful Warship Week campaign. The ship was sold to the Royal Danish Navy and renamed HDMS Esbern Snare.

== Career ==
=== Early operations ===
Blackmore began her contractor sea trials in April, and the destroyer joined the Second Destroyer Flotilla. After completing trials and working up for operational service, in May the destroyer was nominated for escort of military convoys during their passage to Freetown. On 1 June Blackmore joined Convoy WS 19P, with the battleship Nelson and the destroyer Derwent as ocean escort during the convoy's Atlantic passage. On 15 June the destroyer detached from WS 19P upon arrival at Freetown, where she was retained for local escort duties.

On 24 June, the destroyer left Freetown with the destroyer Brilliant to meet with and escort Convoy WS 20 during its Atlantic passage from the Clyde. On 26 June she joined WS 20 on its way to Freetown. In July Blackmore was transferred to the Indian Ocean for convoy defence, detaching from WS 20 on 2 July along with the other ships on arrival to Freetown. On 6 July, Blackmore joined WS 20 as ocean escort, with the battleship Malaya the destroyers Brilliant and Wivern during the convoy's passage to the Cape of Good Hope.

On 17 July, Blackmore detached from ocean escort duties with Malaya and escorted the convoy into Cape Town. On 19 July the destroyer was deployed at Simonstown for convoy defence in the South Atlantic and Indian Ocean. The destroyer remained in duty at Simonstown up until January 1943.

In February, the destroyer joined Convoy WS 26 during its passage from Freetown to the Cape. Blackmore then joined as escort for WS 26 as a relief for the destroyer Quality. The destroyer sailed to Durban for convoy defence duties in the Indian Ocean. On 1 March, the destroyer rejoined WS 26 from Durban as escort with the minesweeper Carnatic and the destroyers Catterick and Relentless. On 3 March, Blackmore detached from the convoy to join another Convoy DN 21 as escort. After arriving at Durban with DN 21, Blackmore took passage to Simonstown to effect a refit. The destroyer's refit was finished in May, and after completing post refit trials, Blackmore took passage to Freetown to serve for Atlantic convoy defence.

The destroyer was then deployed for local escort duties at Freetown, making a passage to Gibraltar on 20 June to escort Convoy WS 31 to Freetown. In July, Blackmore was nominated for transfer to the Mediterranean. The destroyer arrived at Freetown with WS 31 on 4 July and rejoined military convoy WS 31. Blackmore escorted the convoy until 15 July when she returned to Freetown and took passage to the Mediterranean.

=== Mediterranean ===
In August Blackmore joined the 57th Fleet Division based at Malta, and deployed for convoy defence in the central Mediterranean. In September the destroyer joined a naval task force to escort and support the Allied invasion of Italy. On 8 September the destroyer was deployed as an escort of the military convoy TSF1X during passage from Palermo to the Salerno beach head. Upon being released from the invasion of Italy, the destroyer resumed her convoy defence duties with the Division. Between November and December, Blackmore joined the 60th Destroyer Division, also based in Malta but deploying for convoy defence and support duties of military operations in the Adriatic sea.

From January to May 1944, Blackmore continued in her convoy escort duties. On 16 January she carried out a bombardment of Durazzo in Albania with the destroyer Ledbury. During June Blackmore was transferred to the Fifth Destroyer Flotilla, Mediterranean Fleet, taking part in an engagement against four German E-Boats in the Adriatic, with the destroyer Eggesford. One E-Boat was sunk, with ten survivors rescued. In July the destroyer continued in her deployment with the flotilla, this time with the nomination for escort and patrol duties of military convoys during Allied landings in the south of France. This operation was carried under overall US Navy command.

In August, Blackmore joined in the escort of Convoy SM 2 from Naples, sailing on 13 August. After being released from the operation, the destroyer resumed her flotilla duties. In September Blackmore was recalled to the United Kingdom for a refit at Sheerness, before being nominated for service with the Eastern Fleet.

=== Service in the East ===
The ship was taken in hand, the refit taking from October to January. Post refit trials were made at Nore Command. In March, Blackmore was deployed briefly for convoy defence, since additional escorts were needed to combat a concerted submarine and E-Boat attack in the Thames estuary. In April the destroyer was prepared for foreign service with the 18th Destroyer Flotilla within the Eastern Fleet. On 28 April Blackmore joined the flotilla at Bombay. In May the destroyer was deployed as a weather ship in the Andamans, during the Allied landings at Rangoon. After these landings, Blackmore was again deployed for convoy defence in support of military operations and patrol in the Indian Ocean.

Blackmore continued to be deployed in this theatre until August, sailing from Trincomalee on 4 September as part of the escort task force for aircraft carriers during their passage to the Malacca Straits. On 6 September the destroyer joined military convoy JE1F, in the Malacca Straits, forming part of the escort in Operation Zipper.

=== Postwar Service ===
Blackmore was then deployed at Singapore, and was nominated for return to the United Kingdom where she was to be paid off into the reserve. The destroyer sailed from Trincomalee on 8 October 1945, and on arriving at Plymouth the destroyer was paid off at Devonport where she was laid up in the reserve fleet until 1952.

=== Danish service ===
After being placed on the sales list, Blackmore was transferred on loan to Denmark, on 18 July 1952. After refitting, the destroyer joined the Royal Danish Navy as a frigate, renamed Esbern Snare. The ship remained in Danish naval service until 1966, when she was stricken from the active list.

== See also ==
- Esbern Snare

== Publications ==
- Colledge, J. J.; Warlow, Ben (2006) [1969]. Ships of the Royal Navy: The Complete Record of All Fighting Ships of the Royal Navy from the 15th Century to the Present (3rd Rev ed.). London: Chatham Publishing. ISBN 978-1-86176-281-8. OCLC 67375475.
- English, John (1987). The Hunts: a history of the design, development and careers of the 86 destroyers of this class built for the Royal and Allied Navies during World War II. England: World Ship Society. ISBN 0-905617-44-4.
