= MV Gloucester =

Cargo vessel

History
- Name: MV Gloucester (1941)
- Owner: 1941–1966: New Zealand Shipping Company
- Operator: 1941–1966: New Zealand Shipping Company
- Port of registry: (New Zealand)
- Builder: Alexander Stephen and Sons
- Yard number: 575
- Launched: 12 March 1941
- Out of service: 1966
- Fate: Scrapped 1966 in Kaohsiung

General characteristics
- Tonnage: 8,532 GRT
- Length: 450 ft (140 m)
- Beam: 60 ft (18 m)
- Speed: 15 Knots

MV Gloucester (1941) was a cargo vessel operated by the New Zealand Shipping Company from 1941 to 1966. It was mainly intended to transport fruit from New Zealand to the United Kingdom.

== War service ==
The ship was included in several of the North Atlantic convoys between America, Canada and Great Britain.

- Convoy HX 161 Departed Halifax on 21 November 1941 and arrived Liverpool on 6 December
- Convoy ON 050 Liverpool 24/12/41
- Convoy HX 228 NYC 28/02/43
- Convoy UC 027 Belfast Lough 23/06/44
- Convoy CU 060 NYC 27/02/45
- Convoy UC 063B LIVERPOOL 11/04/45

== Fate ==
In 1966 she was sold to Greece and renamed Consulate and scrapped shortly afterwards.
