= HMS Zulu (F124) =

Type 81 or Tribal-class frigate of the Royal Navy and Indonesian Navy

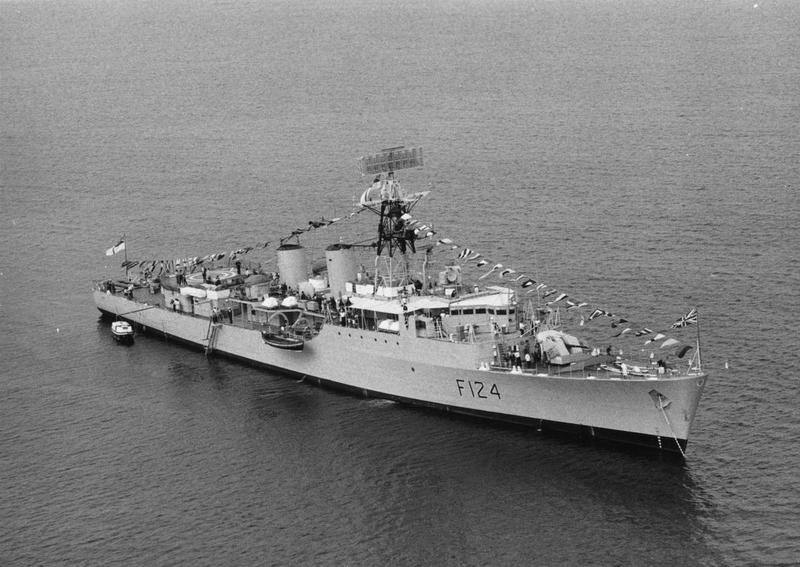
- HMS Zulu

History

United Kingdom
- Name: HMS Zulu
- Namesake: Zulu people
- Builder: Alexander Stephen and Sons, Govan
- Laid down: 13 December 1960
- Launched: 3 July 1962
- Commissioned: 17 April 1964
- Decommissioned: 30 March 1984
- Identification: Pennant number: F124
- Fate: Sold to Indonesia

Indonesia
- Name: KRI Martha Khristina Tiyahahu
- Namesake: Martha Christina Tiahahu
- Acquired: 1984
- Commissioned: 2 May 1985
- Stricken: 2000
- Identification: Pennant number: 331
- Fate: Stricken 2000, scrapped

General characteristics
- Class & type: Tribal-class frigate
- Displacement: 2,300 long tons (2,300 t) standard; 2,700 long tons (2,700 t) full load
- Length: 360 ft 0 in (109.73 m) oa; 350 ft 0 in (106.68 m) pp
- Beam: 42 ft 3 in (12.88 m)
- Draught: 13 ft 3 in (4.04 m); 17 ft 6 in (5.33 m) (propellers)
- Propulsion: Single-shaft COSAG; 1 Steam turbine 12,500 shp (9,300 kW); 1 Metrovick G-6 gas turbine 7,500 shp (5,600 kW)
- Speed: 27 knots (50 km/h; 31 mph) (COSAG)
- Range: 4,500 nautical miles (8,300 km; 5,200 mi) at 12 knots (22 km/h; 14 mph)
- Complement: 253
- Sensors & processing systems: Radar type 965 air-search; Radar type 993 low-angle search; Radar type 978 navigation; Radar type 903 gunnery fire-control; Radar type 262 GWS-21 fire-control; Sonar type 177 search; Sonar type 170 attack; Sonar type 162 bottom profiling; Ashanti and Gurkha; Sonar type 199 variable-depth
- Armament: 2 × single 4.5 inch (114 mm) Mark 5* Mod 1 guns; 2 × single 40 mm Mark 7 Bofors guns, later; 2 × four-rail GWS-20 Sea Cat missile systems; 2 × single 20 mm Oerlikon guns; 1 × Mark 10 Limbo ASW mortar
- Aircraft carried: 1 × Westland Wasp helicopter

HMS Zulu (F124) was a Tribal-class frigate of the Royal Navy in service from 1964 to 1984. She was the third ship bearing the name of HMS Zulu, having been named after an ethnic group located primarily in KwaZulu-Natal Province, South Africa. Zulu was built by Alexander Stephen and Sons, of Govan. She was launched on 3 July 1962 and commissioned on 17 April 1964.

She was sold to the Indonesian Navy in 1984 and renamed KRI Martha Khristina Tiyahahu (331).

== Design and construction ==
The Tribal-, or Type 81-class, frigates were developed in the mid-1950s as a General Purpose frigate, capable of use in both anti-submarine and anti-aircraft duties in a full-scale war, while serving for Cold War policing duties in peace-time, in particular to replace the old Loch-class frigates serving in the Persian Gulf.

The Tribals were 360 ft 0 in (109.73 m) long overall and 350 ft 0 in (106.68 m) between perpendiculars, with a beam of 42 ft 3 in (12.88 m). The ship's hull had a draught of 13 ft 5 1/2 in (4.10 m), with the propeller increasing overall draught to 17 ft 6 in (5.33 m). Displacement was 2,300 long tons (2,300 t) standard and 2,500 long tons (2,500 t) full load. Propulsion was by a single-shaft Combined steam and gas (COSAG) arrangement, effectively half of the powerplant of the County-class destroyers. A single Babcock & Wilcox boiler fed steam at 550 psi (3,800 kPa) and 850 °F (454 °C; 728 K) to a geared steam turbine rated at 12,500 shp (9,300 kW), which could be supplemented by a Metrovick G-6 gas turbine rated at 7,500 shp (5,600 kW) to reach top speed, with the gas turbine also allowing the ship to get underway quickly in an emergency, without having to wait to raise steam. Speed was about 27–28 kn (31–32 mph; 50–52 km/h) using both steam and gas turbine power, and 21 kn (24 mph; 39 km/h) on steam power alone.

The ships were fitted with two QF 4.5-in (113 mm) Mark 5 guns, salvaged from scrapped Second World War destroyers, mounted fore and aft. Anti-aircraft armament consisted of two Seacat anti-aircraft missile launchers with a GWS 21 director. For anti-submarine and anti-ship duties, a hangar and flight deck for a single Westland Wasp helicopter was fitted, while a Limbo anti-submarine mortar provided close-in anti-submarine armament. Mohawk was fitted with a large Type 965 long range air search radar on a lattice foremast, with a Type 993 short range air/surface target indicating radar and Type 978 navigation radar also fitted. An MRS3 fire control system was carried to direct the 4.5-inch guns. The ship had a sonar suite of Type 177 medium range search sonar, Type 162 bottom search and Type 170 attack sonar. The ship had a crew of 253 officers and other ranks. Two 20mm Oerlikon cannon were later fitted for use against small boats during low intensity patrol and policing duties.

Zulu was laid down at Alexander Stephen and Sons, Govan, Glasgow shipyard on 13 December 1960. She was launched on 3 July 1962 and commissioned on 17 April 1964. The ship's cost was £5,100,000. Zulu was the only Tribal completed with Seacat missiles; her six sister frigates were built with two 40 mm Bofors guns and fitted with the Seacat system during later refits.

== Royal Navy Service ==
After commissioning and workup, Zulu joined the 9th Frigate Squadron, operating east of Suez. On 1 July 1965, Zulu went to the assistance of survivors from the Greek merchant ship Thrasyvoulos, who had abandoned ship and came ashore on Abd al Kuri island, South Yemen. On 16 August 1965, Zulu returned to the UK for refit, which was completed at Rosyth in January 1966. In 1966, Zulu contributed to the Beira Patrol off the coast of East Africa, assisting in the enforcement of an oil blockade on Rhodesia. She was on patrol for over 120 days in 1967, intercepting four ships suspected of carrying oil for Rhodesia.

From January to October 1967 Zulu was commanded by the future Admiral of the Fleet William Staveley. On 23 October 1970, the Liberian-flagged tanker Pacific Glory collided with the tanker Allegro off the Isle of Wight and caught fire with 13 killed aboard Pacific Glory. Zulu and the frigate Andromeda, together with the civilian tenders Atherfield and Culver, helped to fight the fire aboard the stricken tanker.

In 1972, a United States Navy P-3 Orion aircraft crashed on a mountain in northern Morocco with the loss of 14 crew. Zulu's Westland Wasp helicopter was sent to the wreckage site, where five bodies were found. In 1974, Zulu deployed to the West Indies. When Guatemala threatened to annex Belize in 1975, Zulu steamed to the area from an American port to augment British forces. Such was the urgency that Zulu left 20 sailors behind.

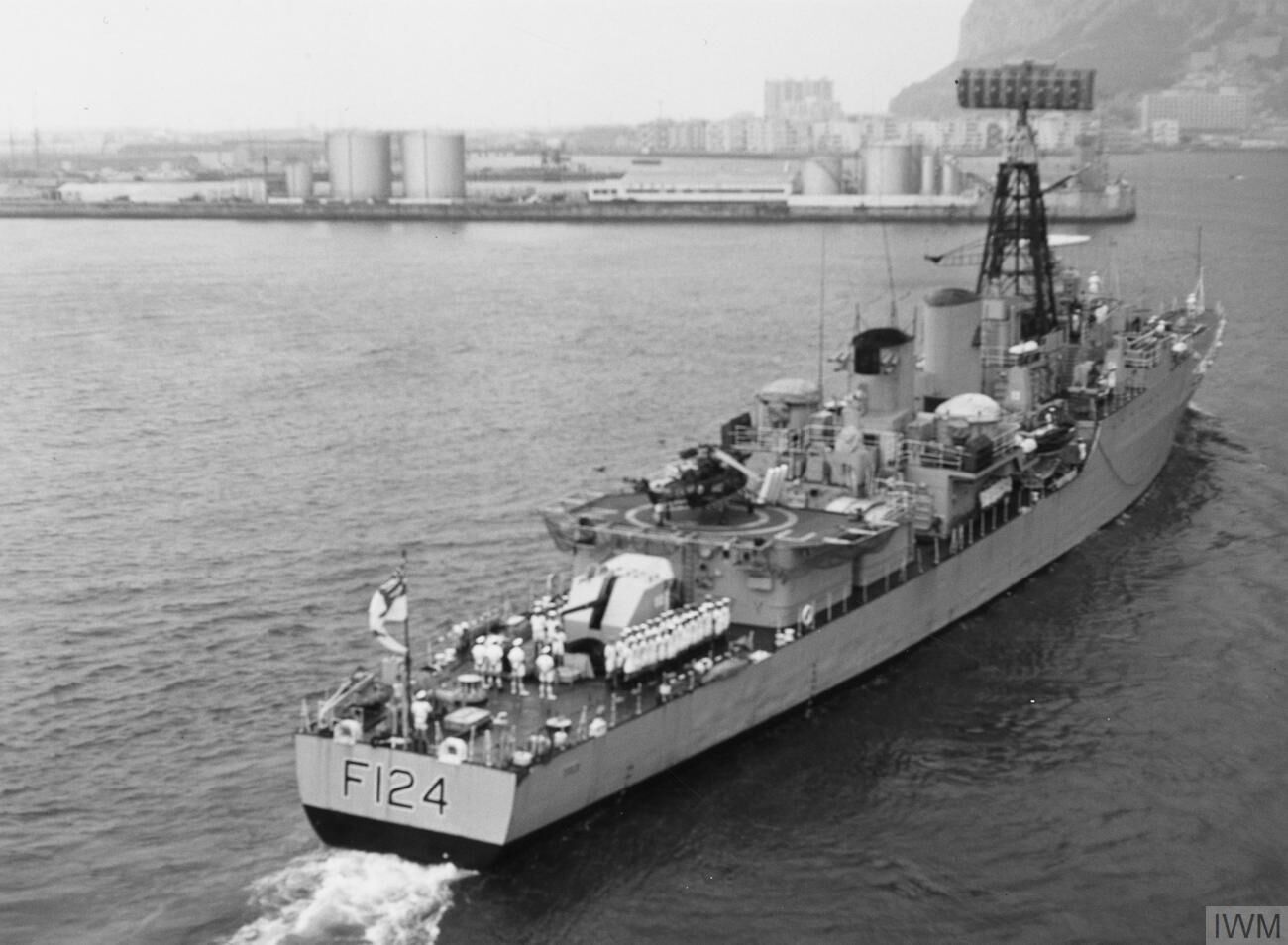
HMS Zulu, approaching Gibraltar, 23 September 1977 (IWM)

In 1977, Zulu was presented at the Spithead Fleet Review, held in honour of Queen Elizabeth's Silver Jubilee. At this time she was part of the 4th Frigate Squadron. Later that year, Zulu formed part of the eight-ship Group 6 deployment, led by the cruiser Tiger, on naval exercises in the Far East.

Manpower shortages in the Royal Navy necessitated Zulu being reduced to reserve in 1979, as part of the Standby Squadron. She was placed on the disposal list in 1981. During the Falklands War, Zulu was taken out of reserve and prepared for active service, recommissioning on 9 August. She operated in home waters and as the West Indies Guard Ship.

In November 1983 Zulu became the Gibraltar Guardship. Before decommissioning on 30 March 1984, Zulu, as the last ship in commission with more than one gun turret, fired the Royal Navy's last "full" broadside.

== Indonesian Navy Service ==
Indonesia bought Zulu on 16 April 1984, renaming the frigate KRI Martha Khristina Tiyahahu, in honour of Martha Christina Tiahahu, who fought against Dutch colonial forces. After refit at Vosper Thornycroft's Woolston yard, the ship commissioned into the Indonesian Navy on 2 May 1985. The frigate was struck from the Indonesian Naval Vessel Register in 2000.

== Bibliography ==
- Baker, A. D. III (1998). Combat Fleets of the World 1998–1999: Their Ships, Aircraft, and Systems. Annapolis, Maryland, US: Naval Institute Press. ISBN 1-55750-111-4.
- Blackman, Raymond V. B., ed. (1971). Jane's Fighting Ships 1971–72. London: Sampson Low, Marston & Co., Ltd. ISBN 0-354-00096-9.
- Colledge, J. J.; Warlow, Ben (2010) [1969]. Ships of the Royal Navy: The Complete Record of All Fighting Ships of the Royal Navy (4th Rev ed.). Newbury, Berkshire: Casemate. ISBN 978-1-935149-07-1. OCLC 603386630.
- Critchley, Mike (1992). British Warships Since 1945: Part 5: Frigates. Liskeard, UK: Maritime Press. ISBN 0-907771-13-0.
- Friedman, Norman (2008). British Destroyers & Frigates: The Second World War and After. Barnsley, UK: Seaforth Publishing. ISBN 978-1-84832-015-4.
- Gardiner, Robert; Chumbley, Stephen, eds. (1995). Conway's All The World's Fighting Ships 1947–1995. Annapolis, Maryland, USA: Naval Institute Press. ISBN 1-55750-132-7.
- Heathcote, T. A. (2002). The British Admirals of the Fleet 1734–1995: A Biographical Dictionary. Barnsley, UK: Leo Cooper. ISBN 1-84468-009-6.
- Marriott, Leo (1983). Royal Navy Frigates 1945-1983. Shepperton, Surrey, UK: Ian Allan. ISBN 0-7110-1322-5.
- Roberts, John (2009). Safeguarding the Nation: The Story of the Modern Royal Navy. Annapolis, Maryland, US: Naval Institute Press. ISBN 978-1-59114-812-8.
- Wertheim, Eric (2005). Combat Fleets of the World 2005–2006: Their Ships, Aircraft, and Systems. Annapolis, Maryland, US: Naval Institute Press. ISBN 1-59114-934-7.
