= Linthouse =

Neighbourhood in Glasgow, Scotland

Coordinates: 55.8632°N 4.3296°W

- Location within Glasgow
- OS grid reference: NS543658
- Council area: Glasgow City Council
- Lieutenancy area: Glasgow
- Country: Scotland
- Sovereign state: United Kingdom
- Post town: GLASGOW
- Postcode district: G51 4
- Dialling code: 0141
- Police: Scotland
- Fire: Scottish
- Ambulance: Scottish
- UK Parliament: Glasgow South West
- Scottish Parliament: Glasgow Pollok

Linthouse is a neighbourhood in the city of Glasgow, Scotland. It is situated directly south of the River Clyde and lies immediately west of Govan, with other adjacent areas including Shieldhall and the Southern General Hospital to the west, and Drumoyne to the south. Although it is currently located within the Govan ward of Glasgow City Council, it was in fact a distinct area separate from Govan (the boundary being the former Fairfield Shipbuilding Company headquarters and Elder Park) until 1901 when it willfully became part of the Burgh of Govan in turn both areas were annexed to Glasgow in 1912.

Linthouse was home to the shipbuilder Alexander Stephen and Sons Limited who built many famous vessels for the Royal Navy in the 20th century.

Linthouse was a separate Church of Scotland parish (Linthouse St. Kenneth) until November 2007 when it merged with the neighbouring parishes of Govan Old and New Govan to become part of the new Govan and Linthouse parish.

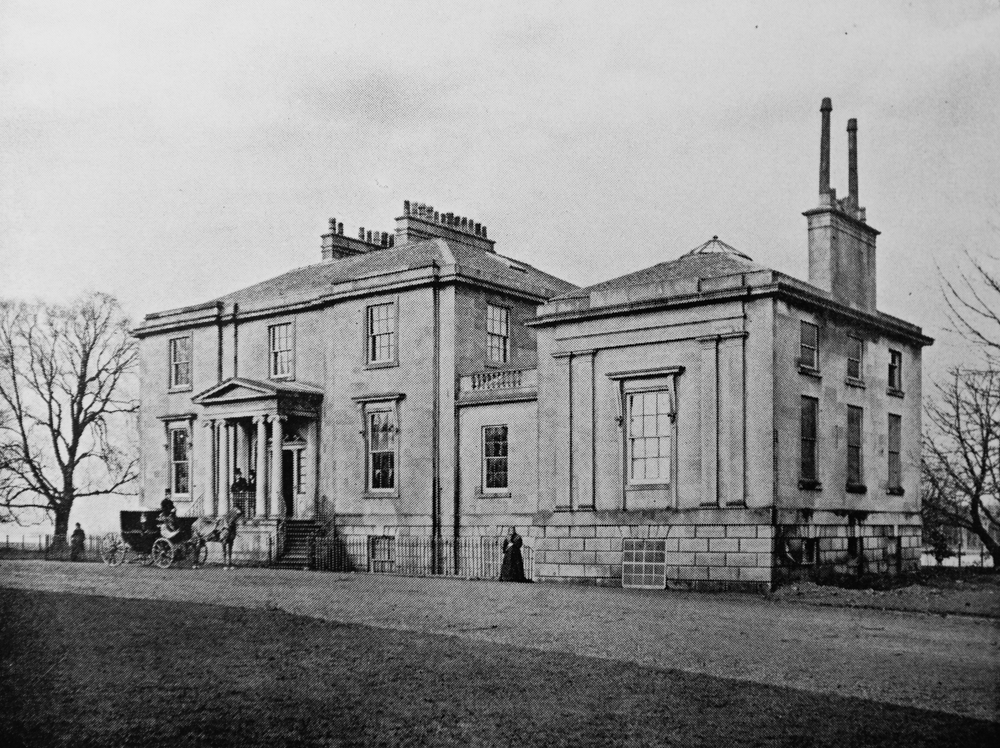
The Linthouse estate mansion house in 1869. The house was demolished around 1915.

Towards the end of the 19th century, there was a Scottish Football League club in the area, Linthouse F.C., although their ground while members of the league was Govandale Park, close to Govan Old Parish Church in the heart of the larger burgh.

The Linthouse Urban Village is an organisation promoting the Linthouse area, as part of the larger Govan Initiative organisation. They run the LUV cafe on Govan Road and a gallery on the other side of the road.

Linthouse also runs an annual Christmas market in the "Tunnel Park" which overlooks the Clyde Tunnel.
