= SS Canonbar =

Steam cargo ship

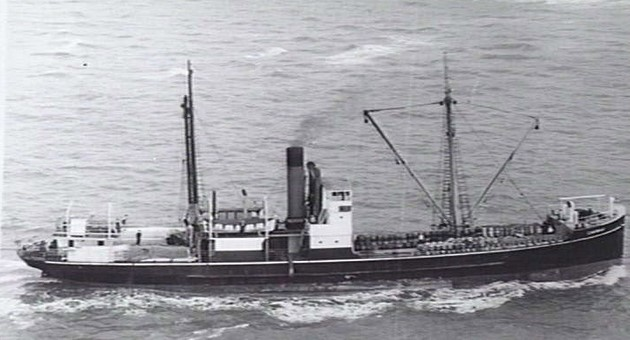
- SS Canonbar in 1940

History
- Name: Canonbar
- Launched: 14 April 1910
- Completed: 1910
- Out of service: March 1966
- Identification: 125242
- Fate: Sunk by shellfire off the Vietnamese coast

General characteristics
- Tonnage: 708 GRT
- Length: 185.8 ft (56.6 m)
- Beam: 32.1 ft (9.8 m)
- Depth: 11.0 ft (3.4 m)

SS Canonbar was a steam cargo ship built in Ardrossan, Scotland in 1910 for the North Coast Steam Navigation Company, and used in the Australian coastal trade. During World War II, she was part of the US supply fleet in the Pacific Ocean. From 1949, she was Rosita, until 1960, when she was renamed Valiente. Under the name Kettara IV, she was sunk by shell fire off the Vietnamese coast in 1966, with the loss of her entire crew.

== Design ==
She was a single-screw, coal-fired steamship, powered by a three cylinder, triple-expansion engine rated at 83 nominal bhp. In addition to being suitable for general cargo, she was originally fitted with two tanks to carry bulk molasses. She had two masts, each fitted with derricks to allow her to load and unload her own cargoes (refer to photograph). In 1927, she was fitted with a small number of passenger cabins.

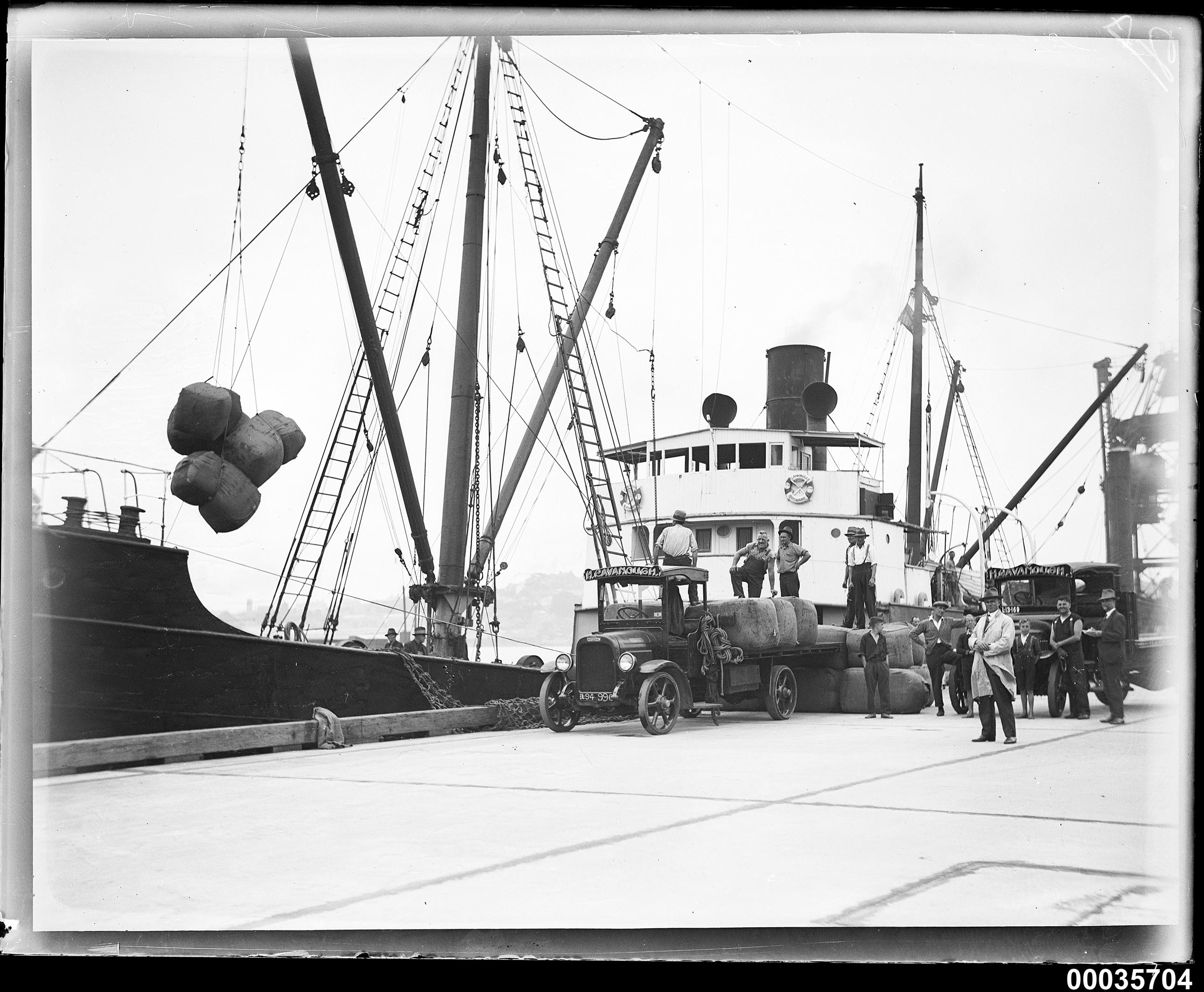
Unloading wool bales from Canonbar (1927-1940)

== Construction, launch and delivery ==
She was built at the Ardrossan Dry Dock & Shipbuilding Co Ltd, Ardrossan, Scotland and launched on 14 April 1910. She left there on 2 June 1910 sailing, via the Suez Canal, to Sydney, where she arrived on 3 August 1910.

== Service history in Australia ==
=== Coaster ===
Upon her arrival at Sydney in 1910, Canonbar was docked, before commencing trade between Sydney and the Clarence and Macleay Rivers, for her first owners the North Coast Steam Navigation Company, of Sydney. She also went to the Richmond River. She was one of fourteen new NCSN Co. ships delivered, between 1904 and 1913, with names ending with 'bar'; the others were Noorebar (1904), Yugulibar (1907), Tintenbar (1908), Minimbar (1909), Burringbar (1910), Maianbar (1910), Coolebar (1911), Wollongbar (1911, a passenger ship), Gunbar (1912), Coombar (1912), Pulganbar (1912), Tambar (1912) and Poonbar (1913).

In September 1926, she was sold to the Brisbane shipping firm John Burke Limited and, from 1927, transferred to running mainly between Brisbane, Sydney and Queensland ports, carrying cargo and a small number of passengers.

=== Incidents and near misses ===
In January 1913, while crossing the Richmond River bar, she was damaged when she struck the breakwater at the river mouth.

In May 1928, she was towing another Jon Burke Ltd. ship, Nautilus, which had previously run aground in the Pioneer River, back to Brisbane from Mackay, when the tow rope parted with the Nautilus filling with water. Later in May 1928, she ran aground herself on the Yule Bank in Moreton Bay. In June 1928, she survived a violent winter gale, while carrying a cargo of timber to Sydney. Rounding out an eventful year, in October 1928, while she was berthed at South Brisbane, somebody cut the mooring hawser at the bow, but was disturbed before they could completely cut the one at the stern. The perpetrator evaded detection. A Water Police crew noticed the bow of Canonbar swinging out from the river bank and raised the alarm.

In mid December 1934, en-route from Rockhampton to Brisbane, she was following a route too close to shore for a ship of her type, when she struck rocks and sustained some damage. In May 1938, she ran aground in the Sandy Strait, near Fraser Island but was undamaged and soon refloated.

=== ‘Rocket mail’ (1934) ===
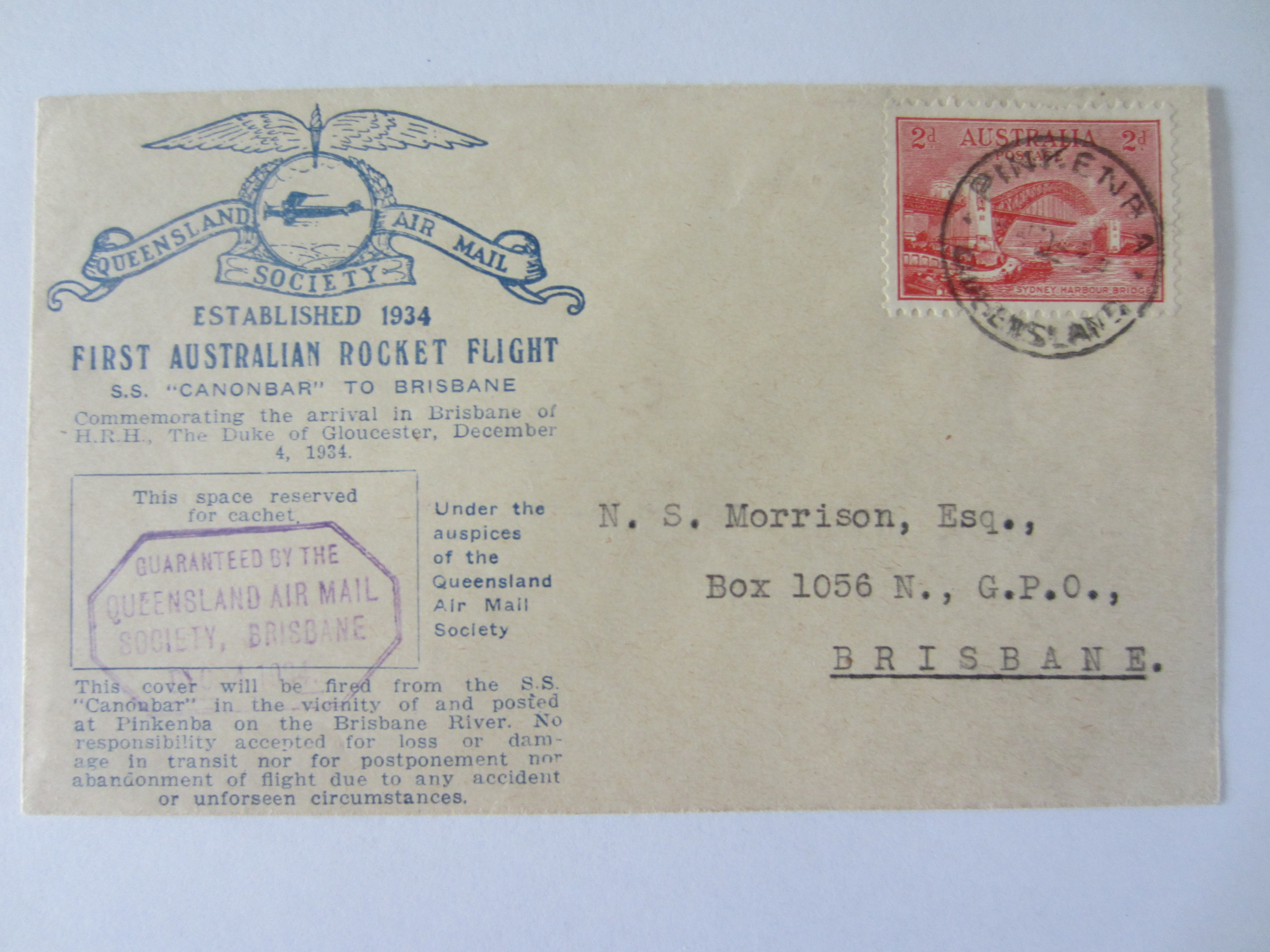
Special cover commemorating the December 1934 'rocket mail' event.

On 4 December 1934, an organisation, with the august name of the Queensland Air Mail Society, launched a rocket from Canonbar carrying 1000 'commemorative covers’, in what was styled the "First Australian rocket flight S.S. Canonbar to Brisbane", The flight itself was less ambitious than it sounded; a rocket was launched, from Canonbar, toward the shoreline near the mouth of the Brisbane River. The plan was that the rocket would land on the shore and the letters it had carried would then be posted to the recipients, at the nearby Pinkenba post office. It was, at very best, only a partial success. The rocket struck a pile on the bank and ended up in the river. Fortunately, Canonbar’s captain presciently had attached a line to the rocket, allowing the container holding the mail to be dragged back to the ship, from where the letters were taken to Pinkenba and posted. The Queensland Air Mail Society was, in fact, a group of postage stamp collectors—specialising in air mail stamps—who were probably more interested in creating the ‘commemorative covers’ than in launching a 'rocket mail' service. It was their first, but not their last, unsuccessful attempt at 'rocket mail'. Serious stamp collectors of the time saw these rocket launches as bringing only ridicule upon those involved and the Post Office dissociated itself from any connection to these farcical, somewhat dangerous, and probably illegal experiments. However, in a manner, their work succeeded, as the commemorative covers from the 1934 rocket launch—and those from a later experiment in 1935, involving Maheno—are still a collector's item, over 80 years later, and one of the few tangible reminders today of Canonbar.

=== Second World War and aftermath ===
During the Second World War, Canonbar was requisitioned by the Australian Government and then used by the United States as a supply ship for the South-West Pacific Campaign. As the war neared its end, she was returned to the Australian Government. Coastal shipping in Australia was in decline and the old ship was no longer needed. It was put up for sale in 1945. However, it was not until 1949 that the ship was sold to the first of its many post-war owners, Carroll Shipping Company of Panama. After that, Canonbar left Australian waters.

== Later service history ==
Canonbar, was only briefly owned by Carroll Shipping Company, for later in 1949 she was sold to Cia Navegacao De Sousa Ltda, of Hong Kong, and was renamed Rosita. She had two other Hong Kong owners; Carfung Shipping Co Ltd, from 1951, and Lanena Shipping Co Ltd. from 1959. In 1960, upon her sale to San Raimundo Cia Naviera SA, of Panama, she was renamed Valiente. Her last owner was Tiong Lam Hang Shipping Co SA, of Panama, who bought her in 1964 and renamed her Ketarra IV.

== Loss ==
On 16 March 1966, Kettara IV, was carrying a load of cement and general cargo from Singapore and bound for Da Nang, when she came under shellfire from the North Vietnamese Army, in the vicinity of the Demilitarized Zone (DMZ). She sank with the loss of all hands.
