= List of Royal Australian Navy losses =

This is a list of Royal Australian Navy (RAN) vessels which were damaged or sunk causing loss of life, in warlike and non-warlike circumstances. The list includes incidents involving equipment (helicopters, whaleboats) attached to ships and naval establishments. The list excludes losses on non-RAN vessels (including attacks on merchant shipping), merchant seaman deaths, and other losses (including prisoner of war deaths). Fatalities include all lives lost on the named vessel at each incident.

By far the bloodiest conflict for the RAN was the Second World War, when 2,170 serving RAN personnel and 845 Australian merchant seaman died from all causes.

| Deaths | Vessel | Event | Conflict/Operation | Location | Date | Vessel fate |
|---|---|---|---|---|---|---|
| 645 | HMAS Sydney | Engaged with the German auxiliary cruiser Kormoran in a mutually destructive battle | World War II | off Western Australia | 19 November 1941 | lost |
| 353 | HMAS Perth | Battle of Sundra Strait - sunk by Japanese cruiser | World War II | Sunda Strait, Dutch East Indies | 28 February - 1 March 1942 | lost |
| 138 | HMAS Parramatta | Torpedoed by German submarine U-559 while supplying Australian garrison in Tobruk | World War II | off Tobruk, Libya | 27 November 1941 | lost |
| 138 | HMAS Yarra | Naval battle with Japanese fleet | World War II | between Java and Western Australia | 4 March 1942 | lost |
| 100 | HMAS Armidale | Aerial attack from Japanese aircraft | World War II | Arafura Sea | 30 November 1942 | lost |
| 84 | HMAS Canberra | Battle of Savo Island - attacked by Japanese naval vessels | World War II | off Savo Island, British Solomon Islands | 9 August 1942 | scuttled |
| 82 | HMAS Voyager | Collision with HMAS Melbourne | Peacetime | Jervis Bay, Australia | 10 February 1964 | lost |
| 35 | AE1 | Diving accident | World War I | off Neulauenburg Islands (Duke of York Islands), German New Guinea | 14 September 1914 | lost |
| 31 | HMAS Matafele | Lost, presumed accidentally sunk | World War II | near China Strait, Territory of Papua | 20 June 1944 | lost |
| 30 | HMAS Australia | Battle of Leyte Gulf - possible Japanese Kamikaze attack | World War II | Leyte Gulf, Philippines | 21 October 1944 | damaged |
| 25 | HMAS Australia | Invasion of Lingayen Gulf - Kamikaze attack | World War II | Lingayen Gulf, Philippines | 6 January 1945 | damaged |
| 24 | HMAS Goorangai | Accidental collision with MV Duntroon | World War II | Port Philip Bay, Australia | 20 November 1940 | lost |
| 21 | HMAS Kuttabul | Torpedoed by Japanese submarine | World War II | Sydney Harbour | 1 June 1942 | lost |
| 14 | HMAS Australia | Invasion of Lingayen Gulf - Kamikaze attack | World War II | Lingayen Gulf, Philippines | 6 January 1945 | damaged |
| 13 | HMAS Hobart | torpedoed by Japanese submarine | World War II | off Espírito Santo, British Solomon Islands | 20 July 1943 | damaged |
| 13 | HMAS Perth | Aerial attack from German aircraft | World War II | off Sphakia, Greece | 29 May 1941 | damaged |
| 10 | HMAS Nizam | Freak wave washes crew overboard | World War II | off Cape Leeuwin, Western Australia | 11 February 1945 | undamaged |
| 9 | HMAS Vampire | Indian Ocean raid - Aerial attack from Japanese aircraft | World War II | off Ceylon | 9 April 1942 | lost |
| 9 | 817 Squadron RAN (helicopter) | helicopter crash during earthquake relief operations | Operation Sumatra Assist | Nias, Indonesia | 2 April 2005 | lost (aircraft) |
| 8 | HMAS Patricia Cam | Aerial attack from Japanese aircraft | World War II | off Arnhem Land, Australia | 22 January 1943 | lost |
| 8 | HMAS Tarakan | Accidental explosion while undergoing repairs | Peacetime | Garden Island, New South Wales, Australia | 25 January 1950 | scrapped |
| 7 | HMAS Pirie | Aerial attack from Japanese aircraft | World War II | Oro Bay, Territory of New Guinea | 11 April 1943 | damaged |
| 6 | HMAS Nizam | Aerial attack from German aircraft | World War II | off Tobruk, Libya | 21 October 1941 | damaged |
| 5 | HMAS Sydney (whaleboat) | Whaleboat capsizes during training exercise | Peacetime | off Hayman Island, Australia | 17 October 1963 | undamaged |
| 4 | HMAS Sydney | Naval battle with German raider | World War I | Cocos (Keeling) Islands | 9 November 1914 | damaged |
| 4 | HMAS Nestor | Aerial attack from Italian aircraft | World War II | off Crete, Greece | 15 June 1942 | scuttled |
| 4 | HMAS Warrnambool | Struck mine while carrying out clearance work | Peacetime | off northern Queensland | 13 September 1947 | lost |
| 4 | HMAS Westralia | Onboard fire | Peacetime | off Western Australia | 5 May 1998 | damaged |
| 4 | HMAS Perth | Aerial attack from German aircraft | World War II | off Crete, Greece | 30 May 1941 | damaged |
| 4 | HMAS Tambar | Accidental attack from shore battery | World War II | off Moreton Island, Queensland | 4 March 1942 | damaged |
| 3 | HMAS Australia (plane) | Operation Menace - HMAS Australia's spotting plane shot down by Vichy France aircraft | World War II | off Dakar, French West Africa | 25 September 1940 | lost (aircraft) |
| 3 | HMAS Swan | Aerial attack from Japanese aircraft during bombing of Darwin | World War II | Darwin, Australia | 19 February 1942 | damaged |
| 3 | HMAS Lismore | Whaleboat capsizes while transporting crew | World War II | Jervis Bay, Australia | 10 February 1941 | undamaged |
| 3 | HMAS Wallaroo | Accidental collision with US Liberty Ship Henry Gilbert Costin | World War II | off Fremantle, Western Australia | 11 June 1943 | lost |
| 2 | HMAS Arrow | Collision with wharf caused by Cyclone Tracy | Peacetime | Darwin, Australia | 25 December 1974 | lost |
| 2 | HMAS Kanimbla (helicopter) | Onboard helicopter crash | Operation Quickstep | off Fiji | 29 November 2006 | lost (aircraft) |
| 2 | HMAS Hobart | Accidental aerial attack from US aircraft | Vietnam War | off Con Co Island, Democratic Republic of Vietnam | 17 June 1968 | damaged |
| 2 | HMAS Arunta | Invasion of Lingayen Gulf - Kamikaze attack | World War II | Lingayen Gulf, Philippines | 6 January 1945 | damaged |
| 2 | HMAS Napier | Freak wave washes crew overboard | World War II | Bass Strait, Australia | 7 March 1945 | undamaged |
| 2 | HMAS Kara Kara | Aerial attack from Japanese aircraft during bombing of Darwin | World War II | Darwin, Australia | 19 February 1942 | damaged |
| 2 | HMAS Woomera | Accidental explosion during ammunition disposal | Peacetime | off Sydney, Australia | 11 October 1960 | lost |
| 2 | HMAS Vengeance (whaleboat) | Whaleboat capsizes while transporting crew | Peacetime | Port Philip Bay, Australia | 9 March 1954 | undamaged |
| 2 | HMAS Colac | Shore-based gunfire | World War II | British Solomon Islands | 26 May 1945 | undamaged |
| 2 | HMAS Lolita | Accidental explosion | World War II | off Madang, Territory of New Guinea | 13 June 1945 | damaged |
| 1 | HMAS Vampire | Battle of Calabria - Aerial attack from Italian aircraft | World War II | off Punta Stilo, Italy | 9 July 1940 | damaged |
| 1 | HMAS Waterhen | Aerial attack from German and Italian aircraft | World War II | off Sollum, Egypt | 30 June 1941 | lost |
| 1 | HMAS Kangaroo | Aerial attack from Japanese aircraft during bombing of Darwin | World War II | Darwin, Australia | 19 February 1942 | damaged |
| 1 | HMAS Gunbar | Aerial attack from Japanese aircraft during bombing of Darwin | World War II | Darwin, Australia | 22 February 1942 | damaged |
| 1 | HMAS Chinampa | Shore-based gunfire | World War II | off Saumlaki, Dutch East Indies | 31 August 1942 | undamaged |
