= Equipment losses in World War II =

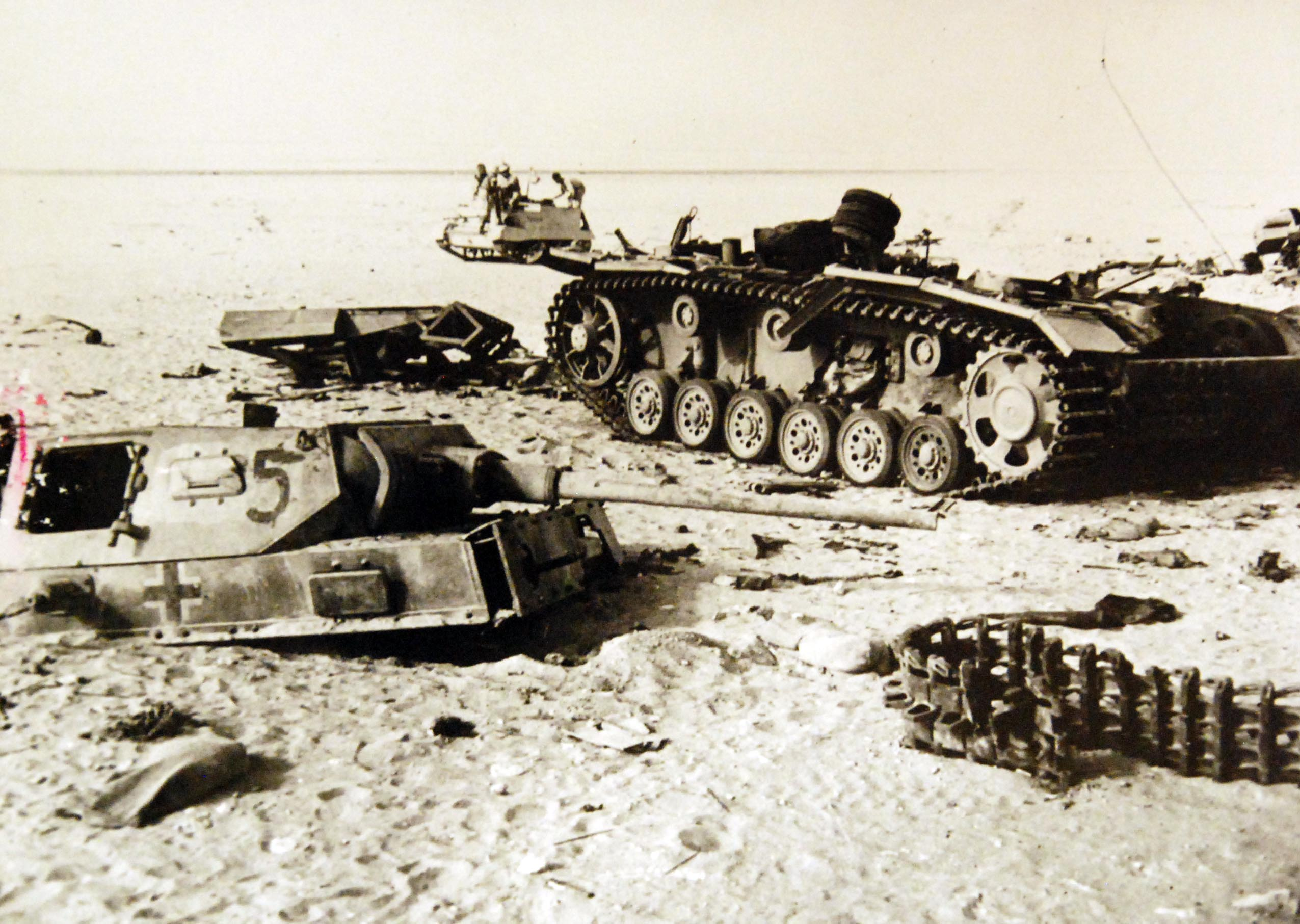
Lot-913-J-L-4: WWII-North African Campaign. Fighting in the desert has died down again following the defeat of Rommel’s drive on the British desert positions, but there are still many signs of the battle. Shown: A Bren Carrier crossing the battlefield after the enemy had retreated, passed may derelict enemy vehicles. Office of War Information Photograph. Courtesy of the Library of Congress

Equipment losses in World War II or Matériel losses in World War II refers to military equipment destroyed during World War II, the deadliest and most costly war in human history.

== Air ==
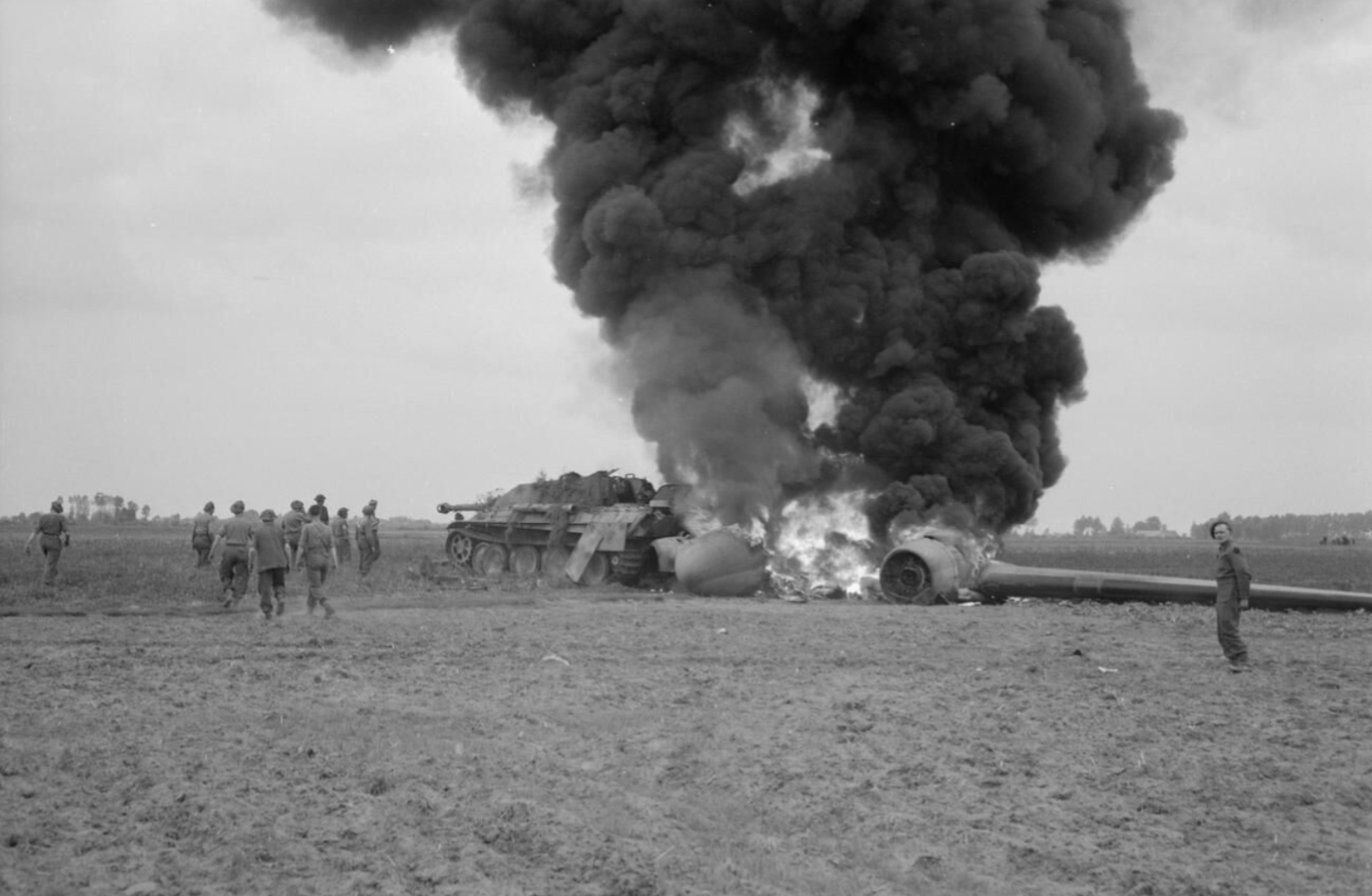
An American C-47 aircraft burning after being shot down during Operation Market Garden

- China: Total losses of the Nationalist Air Force were 2,468 aircraft (According to Chinese and Taiwanese sources).
- Finland: Reported losses during the Winter War totaled 67, of which 42 were operational, while 536 aircraft were lost during the Continuation War, of which 209 were operational losses (137 fighters, 51 bombers and 21 other), for a total of 603 aircraft lost in both wars.
- France: From the beginning of the war until the cease-fire in 1940, 892 aircraft were lost, of which 413 were in action and 234 were on the ground. Losses included 508 fighters and 218 bombers.
- Germany produced 119,907 aircraft of all types, including bomber, transport, reconnaissance, gliders, training, seaplanes and flying boats. Most of them were either destroyed, damaged, captured or sold. Estimated total number of destroyed and damaged for the war totaled 116,584 aircraft, of which over 63,000 were total losses and the remainder damaged at 10% or more. By type, losses totaled 41,452 fighters, 22,037 bombers, 15,428 trainers, 10,221 night-intruders, 8,548 ground attack, 6,733 reconnaissance, 6,141 transports and 6,024 undefined.
- Italy: Total losses were 5,272 aircraft, of which 3,269 were lost in combat.
- Japan: Estimates vary from 35,000 to 50,000 total losses, with about 20,000 lost operationally.
- Netherlands: Total losses were 81 aircraft during the May 1940 campaign.
- Poland: Total losses were 398 lost, 112 flew to then neutral Romania, 286 destroyed, 1 missing and unaccounted for. Aircraft losses by type: 116 fighters, 112 dive bombers, 81 reconnaissance aircraft, 36 bombers, 21 sea planes, and 9 transports. The Polish Air Force evacuated one day after the Soviet Invasion of Poland, September 18, 1939. However, some trainer aircraft kept on flying as scout planes. The last two were grounded on October 2, 1939 by the order of General Franciszek Kleeberg. The losses after the evacuation are not known (September 19-October 2, 1939).
- Soviet Union: Total losses were 17,900 bombers, 23,600 ground attacker, 46,800 fighter aircraft, and 18,100 training, transport and other aircraft; an overall loss of over 106,400 aircraft; 46,100 in combat and 60,300 non-combat. Of which, 18,300 Lend-Lease aircraft were lost. Grigori F. Krivosheev states: "A high percentage of combat aircraft were lost in relation to the number available on 22 June 1941: 442% (total losses) or 216% (combat losses). In the air force over a half of losses were non-combat losses."
- British Empire
  - United Kingdom: Europe 22,010 (including 10,045 fighters and 11,965 bombers)
  - Australia, Pacific and South East Asia: 250
- United States: Total losses were nearly 95,000, including 52,951 operational losses (38,418 in Europe and 14,533 in the Pacific).

== Land ==
French
6,126 tanks and self-propelled guns (~2,000 destroyed, ~4,000 captured by Germans in 1939-1940).
946 armoured cars and half-track destroyed or captured by Germans in 1939-1940.
At least 1,741 tanks destroyed in 1939-1940, 549 light and medium tanks destroyed in 1944-1945 and 134 combat cars.

UK
15,844 tanks and 1,957 armoured cars lost.

On the Western Front in 1944–1945, 4,477 British Commonwealth tanks were destroyed, including 2,712 M4 Sherman tanks, 656 Churchill tanks, 609 Cromwell tanks, 433 M3 Stuart light tanks, 39 Cruiser Mk VIII Challenger tanks, 26 Comet tanks, 2 M24 Chaffee light tanks.

US
~11,000 tanks/SPGs/tank destroyers lost.

From June 6, 1944 through May 15, 1945 for US tank and tank destroyer losses in the European Theater of Operations, United States Army (Western Front): around 7,000 (including 4,295–4,399 M4 tanks, 178 M4 (105mm howitzer), 1,507 M3 Stuart tanks and 909–919 tank destroyers, of which 540 M10 tank destroyers, 217 M18 Hellcat and 152 M36 tank destroyers). Losses of 5th Army (Sicily, Italy): 3,377 armored vehicles, including 1,171 M4s. Several hundred tanks lost in the Pacific Theater.

Germany

- Around 67,429 tank and self-propelled guns, 87,329 half-track trucks; 36,703 half-track tractors; 21,880 half-track armoured personnel carriers destroyed or captured.
- 226,300? Military cars and 97,470? Military motor-cycles destroyed or captured.
- 159,144 Anti-tank guns and Artillery destroyed or captured.
- 86,400 Mortars destroyed or captured.

Soviet claims according to Grigori F. Krivosheev: 42,700 tanks, tank destroyers, self-propelled guns and assault guns, 379,400 guns and mortars and 75,700 combat aircraft were lost on the Eastern front. According to Heinz Guderian (supplied by Q.M.G of the General Staff of the Army): Total 33,324 tanks, assault guns, tank destroyers, self-propelled guns, armored personnel carriers and armored cars lost on the Eastern Front from 22/6/1941 until November 1944. Paul Winter, in Defeating Hitler, states "these figures are undoubtedly too low"

Italy
Around 3,500 tanks
Poland
880 tanks and tankettes destroyed and captured; some crossed into Hungary. Moreover, all armored cars were destroyed within the first two weeks of fighting.
Japan
Around 3,000 tanks/self-propelled guns
Soviet Union
According to Grigori F. Krivosheev: "All losses of arms and equipment are counted as irrecoverable losses, i.e. beyond economic repair or no longer serviceable"

- 83,500 tanks lost: 5,200 heavy tanks, 44,900 medium tanks, 33,400 light tanks (including 11,900 Lend-Lease tanks and self-propelled guns lost)
- 13,000 SPGs lost: 2,300 heavy SPGs, 2,100 medium SPGs, 8,600 light SPGs
- 37,600 Armoured car and half-track (including 5,000 Lend-Lease armoured personnel carriers lost)

Soviet tank losses
	Received	Total stock	Losses	% of Total stock loss
Tanks	86,100	108,700	83,500	76.8
Heavy	10,000	10,500	5,200	49.5
Medium	55,000	55,900	44,900	80.3
Light	21,100	42,300	33,400	79.0
SP Guns	23,100	23,100	13,000	56.3
Heavy	5,000	5,000	2,300	46.0
Medium	4,000	4,000	2,100	52.5
Light	14,000	14,000	8,600	61.4
Tanks and SP Guns	109,100	131,700	96,500	73.3
Armored cars, tractors, other armoured vehicles	59,100	72,200	37,600	52.1

Comparative figures
	1941	1942	1943	1944	1945	Total
Soviet Tank strength(^{1})	22,600	7,700	20,600	21,100	25,400	
German Tank strength(^{1})	5,262	4,896	5,648	5,266	6,284	
Soviet Tank Production	6,274	24,639	19,959	16,975	4,384	72,231
German Tank Production	3,256	4,278	5,966	9,161	1,098	23,759
Production ratio(^{2}) (German:Soviet)	1:1.9	1:5.8	1:3.3	1:1.9	1:4.0	1:3.0
Soviet Tank losses	20,500	15,000	22,400	16,900	8,700	83,500
German Tank losses	2,758	2,648	6,362	6,434	7,382	25,584
Tank exchange ratio(^{2}) (German:Soviet)	1:7.4	1:5.7	1:3.5	1:2.6	1:1.2	1:3.3

Note: Table does not include assault guns or any other type of SPG.

According to Steven Zaloga:
(^{1}) "As of January each year, except for 1941 which is as of 22 June 1941. German strength is entire strength, not only the Eastern Front. In July 1944 the Germans had over 1,500 tanks in Normandy and several hundred in other theatres such as Italy and the Balkans. Likewise, the Soviet kept about 3,000 tanks in the Far East through much of the war."
(^{2}) "German tank losses here include all fronts; the tank exchange ratio deletes estimated German losses to Anglo-American forces and so reflects only the Soviet-German loss."

== Total material, arms and equipment losses ==
Grigori F. Krivosheev concludes: "Losses during strategic operations accounted for 61.48% of small-arms losses, 65.52% of tank and SP gun losses, 56.89% of gun and mortar losses and 58.6% of combat aircraft losses during the war. On average 11,000 small arms, 68 tanks, and 30 aircraft were lost each day. In such as the Baltic, Beyelorussian, Kiev and Voronezh-Voroshilovgrad defensive operations, 20-30,000 small arms, 90-290 tanks, 200-520 guns and mortars and 30-100 combat aircraft were lost daily. Losses were also high during the Battle of Kursk and Berlin offensive, with 70-90 tanks, 90-210 guns and mortars and 25-40 aircraft lost each day."

== Sea ==
Table of losses
Country	Carriers, Escort carrier and Seaplane tenders	Battleships and battlecruisers	Cruisers	Destroyers	Escort destroyers, frigates and Sloops	Submarines	Other warships	Auxiliary	Total	Notes
Australia			3	4	2		3	3	15	
Canada				6	11		9	5	31	
France		2	8	36		33	14	2	94	
Free France				2	3	1	4		9	
Germany		4	9	27		765			805	Includes scuttled ships
Greece		2 (Note: WWI-era Battleships:Kilkis and Lemnos)	1 (Note: Cruiser Elli)	4		4	10	5	26	
Italy		2	11	48		89	305		455	
Empire of Japan	19	8	37	134		130			328	3 further battleships foundered
Netherlands			2	9	0	14	6	26	57	
Norway			2 (Note: Coastal Ships: HNoMS Norge and HNoMS Eidsvold)	3	4	4	8	2	23	
Soviet Union		1 (Note: Soviet Battleship Marat)	1	33 (Note: 29 Destroyers + 3 Flotilla leaders)	4	98	522 (Note: According to Grigori F. Krivosheev, the Soviet Union lost 1,014 ships of various classes, 314 were 1st, 2nd or 3rd class surface ships and submarines, 139 motor torpedo boats, 128 submarine chasers, 77 armoured launches, 168 minesweepers (Auxiliary) and 188 patrol and other boats(Auxiliary).)	356	1,014	
United Kingdom	10	5	31	132	42 (Note: 10 Frigates, 22 Corvettes, 10 Sloops)	75	0	1,035	1,340	
United States	15	3	10	87	15	54	109	367	660	
Poland			1	3	1	2	1	3	11	

== Bibliography ==
- Zaloga, Steven (2015). Armored Champion: The Top Tanks of World War II. Stackpole. ISBN 978-0811714372.
- Zaloga, Steven (2006). US Armored Units in the North African and Italian Campaigns 1942-45. Osprey. ISBN 978-1-84176-966-0.

== See also ==
- List of Soviet military units that lost their standards in World War II
