= Woomera =

Woomera (English: /ˈwʊmərə/) originally refers to:

- Woomera (spear-thrower), an Indigenous Australian spear-throwing tool

Woomera may also refer to:

== Places ==
=== Australia ===
==== South Australia ====
- RAAF Woomera Range Complex, a major Australian military and civil aerospace facility and operation
  - RAAF Base Woomera, an operational Royal Australian Air Force military airbase located within the RAAF Woomera Range Complex
  - Woomera Launch Area 5, a rocket launch site on the RAAF Woomera Range Complex
- Woomera Immigration Reception and Processing Centre (IRPC), a former immigration detention centre
- Woomera, South Australia, a gazetted locality; also known as "Woomera Village"

=== Elsewhere ===
- 11195 Woomera, a main-belt asteroid discovered in 1999
- Woomera (crater), a crater on Mars

== Technology ==
- Woomera protocol, is a VoIP tool allowing support of multiple VoIP protocols

== Military ==
- CAC Woomera, a prototype bomber aircraft designed by Commonwealth Aircraft Corporation during World War II
- HMAS Woomera, a vessel used for carrying armament and stores; in service from 1945 to 1960
