= Japanese submarine I-180 =

World War II Japanese first-class submarine

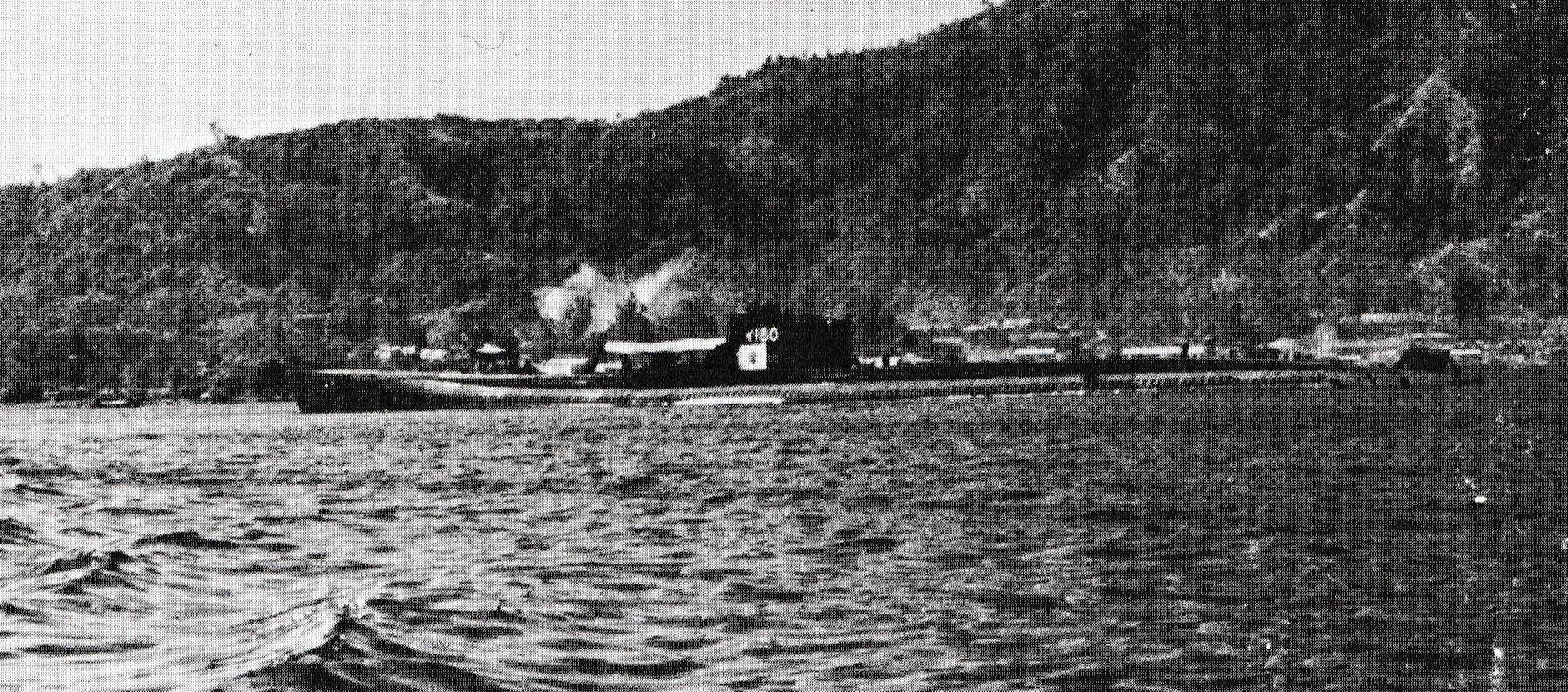
- I-180 entering Rabaul, 9 September 1943

History

Empire of Japan
- Name: I-180
- Builder: Yokosuka Naval Arsenal
- Laid down: 17 April 1941, as I-80
- Launched: 7 February 1942
- Completed: 15 January 1943, as I-180
- Stricken: 10 July 1944
- Fate: Sunk by USS Gilmore, 26 April 1944

General characteristics
- Class & type: Kaidai type, KD7-class
- Displacement: 1,833 long tons (1,862 t) surfaced; 2,602 long tons (2,644 t) submerged
- Length: 346 ft (105 m)
- Beam: 27 ft (8.2 m)
- Draught: 15 ft (4.6 m)
- Propulsion: 2 × diesel engines, 8,000 hp (6.0 MW); Electric motors, 1,800 hp (1.3 MW)
- Speed: 23 knots (43 km/h; 26 mph) (surfaced); 8 kn (15 km/h; 9.2 mph) (submerged)
- Range: 8,000 nmi (15,000 km) at 16 kn (30 km/h; 18 mph) (surfaced)
- Endurance: 75 days
- Test depth: 80 m (260 ft)
- Complement: 86 officers and men
- Armament: 6 × 533 mm (21 in) forward torpedo tubes; 12 × Type 95 torpedoes; 1 × 120 mm (4.7 in) deck gun

Japanese submarine I-180 (originally I-80) was a Kaidai type (KD7 sub-class) cruiser submarine of the Imperial Japanese Navy during World War II. Ordered in 1939 under the 4th Naval Armaments Supplement Programme, she was laid down at the Yokosuka Naval Arsenal on 17 April 1941 as I-80. Launched on 7 February 1942, she was renumbered I-180 on 20 May 1942, and completed on 15 January 1943.

== Service history ==
At the end of March 1943, with her sister ships I-177 and I-178, I-180 departed from Truk to patrol off the east coast of Australia. There she torpedoed and sank the Australian merchant ship Wollongbar on 29 April 1943, the Norwegian merchant ship Fingal on 5 May 1943, and damaged the Australian merchant vessels Ormiston and Caradale on 12 May 1943.

In mid-July 1943 I-180 was diverted from her patrol to Kolombangara in the Solomon Islands, arriving in the aftermath of the battle and rescuing 21 survivors from the light cruiser Jintsu.

On 12 October 1943, the Allies launched an air offensive against Rabaul, with 349 aircraft attacking the port and airfields. During the attack I-180 sustained a direct hit which wrecked her superstructure and prevented her from diving. She sailed on the surface back to Sasebo for repairs and was operational again early the next year.

In late March 1944 she sailed from Ominato to patrol off the Aleutian Islands. On 19 April she sank the liberty ship SS John Straub, and almost certainly also sank the Soviet cargo ship Pavlin Vinogradov on 22 April.

Late on 25 April, she was detected while surfaced by the destroyer escort USS Gilmore southwest of Chirikof Island. The submarine promptly crash dived, and over the next three hours Gilmore laid down three barrages of Mark 10 "Hedgehog" anti-submarine mortar shells without result, and then two patterns of depth charges, before finally seeing a heavy underwater explosion at 01:12 on 26 April at 55°9′57″N 155°40′0″W. On 20 May 1944 I-180 was presumed lost with all hands, and on 10 July 1944 was removed from the Navy List.
