= SS Wollongbar (1922) =

Passenger steamship

History
- Name: Wollongbar
- Owner: North Coast Steam Navigation Company
- Builder: Lithgows, Port Glasgow
- Yard number: 746
- Launched: 1922
- Fate: Torpedoed and sunk on 29 April 1943

General characteristics
- Tonnage: 2,240 gross register tons
- Length: 285.1 ft (86.9 m)
- Beam: 42.1 ft (12.8 m)
- Draught: 23.9 ft (7.3 m)
- Propulsion: Triple expansion engine
- Speed: 20 knots (37 km/h; 23 mph)

Wollongbar was a 2,239-ton passenger steamship built by the Lithgows, Port Glasgow in 1922 for the North Coast Steam Navigation Company, as a replacement for Wollongbar which was wrecked in 1921.

== Fate ==
She was torpedoed by the Imperial Japanese Navy submarine I-180 off Crescent Head, New South Wales while in a convoy on 29 April 1943. When she sank, thirty four crew members died and five of her crew waited until they were rescued by two fishermen, Tom and Claude Radleigh, and taken to Port Macquarie. Three returned to Sydney after a night's rest. Frank Emson, greaser, was rushed to hospital and W. J. Mason, chief officer, spent 10 days in hospital. Both eventually recovered.

In 2020 the shipwreck was confirmed discovered by Heritage NSW.
