= HMAS Tambar =

History

Australia
- Name: Tambar
- Owner: North Coast Steam Navigation Company (1912-1919)
- Builder: Greenock and Grangemouth Dockyard Company, Grangemouth
- Launched: 1912
- Identification: UK Official Number: 131522
- Fate: Broken up in 1960

History

Australia
- Name: Tambar

General characteristics
- Tonnage: 456 gross register tons
- Length: 145.2 ft (44.3 m)
- Beam: 30.1 ft (9.2 m)
- Draught: 8.7 ft (2.7 m)
- Propulsion: Twin screw triple expansion steam engine

HMAS Tambar was an auxiliary minesweeper operated by the Royal Australian Navy (RAN) during World War II.

== Service history ==
Built in 1912 by the Greenock and Grangemouth Dockyard Company, Grangemouth for the North Coast Steam Navigation Company. She was sold in 1919 to the British New Guinea Development Company, in 1928 to the Tasmanian Government and later to Holyman & Sons. Tambar was requisitioned by the RAN and commissioned as an auxiliary minesweeper. On 4 March 1942, HMAS Tambar was fired on and hit by the Examination Battery at Fort Cowan Cowan, Moreton Island. Two crew were killed outright and another later died of his wounds. She was returned to her owners in 1946.

== Fate ==
Tambar was scrapped in Melbourne in 1960.
