= HMAS Woomera =

1945 Australian naval vessel

Coordinates: 33.979°S 151.560°E

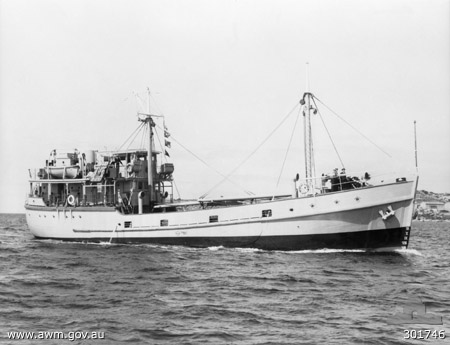
- Woomera

History

Australia
- Namesake: Woomera (spear-thrower)
- Builder: Australian Shipbuilding Board, Fremantle
- Completed: November 1945
- Commissioned: 1945 (as AV Ashburton); 23 January 1946 (into RAN)
- Renamed: 23 January 1946 (to HMAS Woomera)
- Fate: Sunk following an accidental explosion, 11 October 1960

General characteristics
- Type: Armament store carrier
- Displacement: 603 tons
- Length: 125 ft (38 m)
- Beam: 24 ft (7.3 m)
- Draught: 12 ft 6 in (3.81 m)
- Propulsion: Ruston-Hornsby diesel engines - 2 shafts BHP 306
- Speed: 7.5 knots (13.9 km/h)
- Range: 1,000 nautical miles (1,900 km) at 7.5 knots (13.9 km/h)
- Complement: 3 officers, 17 sailors

HMAS Woomera was an Australian naval vessel operated by the Australian Army and Royal Australian Navy (RAN). Built in Fremantle, Western Australia, she was one of a class of 32 wooden motor vessels intended for the Department of Commerce, but later allocated to the Army. She initially entered service in late 1945 as AV 1356 (Ashburton), before being transferred to the RAN on 23 January 1946 and commissioned as Woomera. The ship's main role was carrying stores and dumping obsolete ammunition surplus from all three military services at sea. In this role she visited many ports in Australia and New Guinea.

== Explosion and loss ==
On the morning of 11 October 1960, under the command of Lieutenant Commander Doug Marshall, Woomera sailed from Sydney Harbour carrying approximately 130 tons of 6-inch shells and 3 tons of unboxed aircraft parachute flares for dumping in the ocean. Shortly before 1000 hours, during the dumping operation, Marshall observed a crew member pick up a flare that appeared to have its parachute deployed and tangled. As the crew member attempted to dislodge the parachute, Marshall heard a crack and was temporarily blinded by a bright flash as stores being raised from the hold exploded.

Now on fire, Woomera broadcast a distress signal giving her position 23 mi (37 km) south-east of Sydney heads. The distress signal was responded to by HMAS Quickmatch and HMS Cavendish, engaged in exercises a few miles from Woomera's position. Their crews observed smoke on the horizon and they immediately set a course to assist. The explosion and fire, fuelled by her cargo of ammunition severely damaged the wooden ship and crew members began to abandon the ship without waiting for orders from Marshall. Arriving on the scene at around 1030, Quickmatch launched boats to pick up survivors seen in the water, while Cavendish positioned alongside the burning Woomera, attempting fight the fire.

25 survivors were rescued with only minor injuries reported. Some survivors reported being attacked by several albatross while awaiting rescue. Aboard Quickmatch, a headcount confirmed that two men, Able Seaman Barrie Baker and Seaman Robert Herd were missing. Not part of the regular crew, Baker and Herd were part of a work party embarked aboard Woomera to assist with the dumping. A few minutes later at 1104, Woomera sank. Cavendish then joined Quickmatch in searching for the missing men downwind of the wreck, but by 1400 had failed to locate them.

== Aftermath ==
The cause of the explosion was never confirmed, however it is speculated that a parachute flare containing a friction igniter may have been triggered by the accidental deployment of its parachute. The flares had been loaded in an unsecured, unboxed state which had not been noticed at the depot as routine inspections had been delayed. The officers and crew of Woomera were not aware that these flares were required to be boxed, so had no cause for concern.

Lieutenant Commander Marshall and Executive Officer Lieutenant Sam Bateman faced courts-martial charged with negligence after the sinking. Both were subsequently acquitted after the court found there was no case to answer. Following a board of inquiry, two storesmen from the RAN Armament Depot Sydney were reprimanded for not adhering to standing orders around the handling of explosive stores. Lieutenant Bateman would go on to have a distinguished naval and academic career, including as Commanding Officer of the destroyer escort HMAS Yarra and the destroyer HMAS Hobart, retiring from the Navy with the rank of Commodore in 1993.

Two members crew members from Woomera received the British Empire Medal in recognition of their actions following the explosion. Francis Thompson, the ship's radio operator remained at his station while the radio room burned around him, relaying details of their position. Chief Engineer Ray Butler remained on board fighting the fire until ordered to abandon ship by Marshall. The bodies of Baker and Herd were never recovered.

Dumping of surplus ammunition and stores at sea continued until the 1970s.

== Bibliography ==
- Straczek, Joe (2001). "HMAS Woomera - Life and Loss". Australian Warship Review. 6.
