= USS Gilmore =

Evarts-class destroyer escort

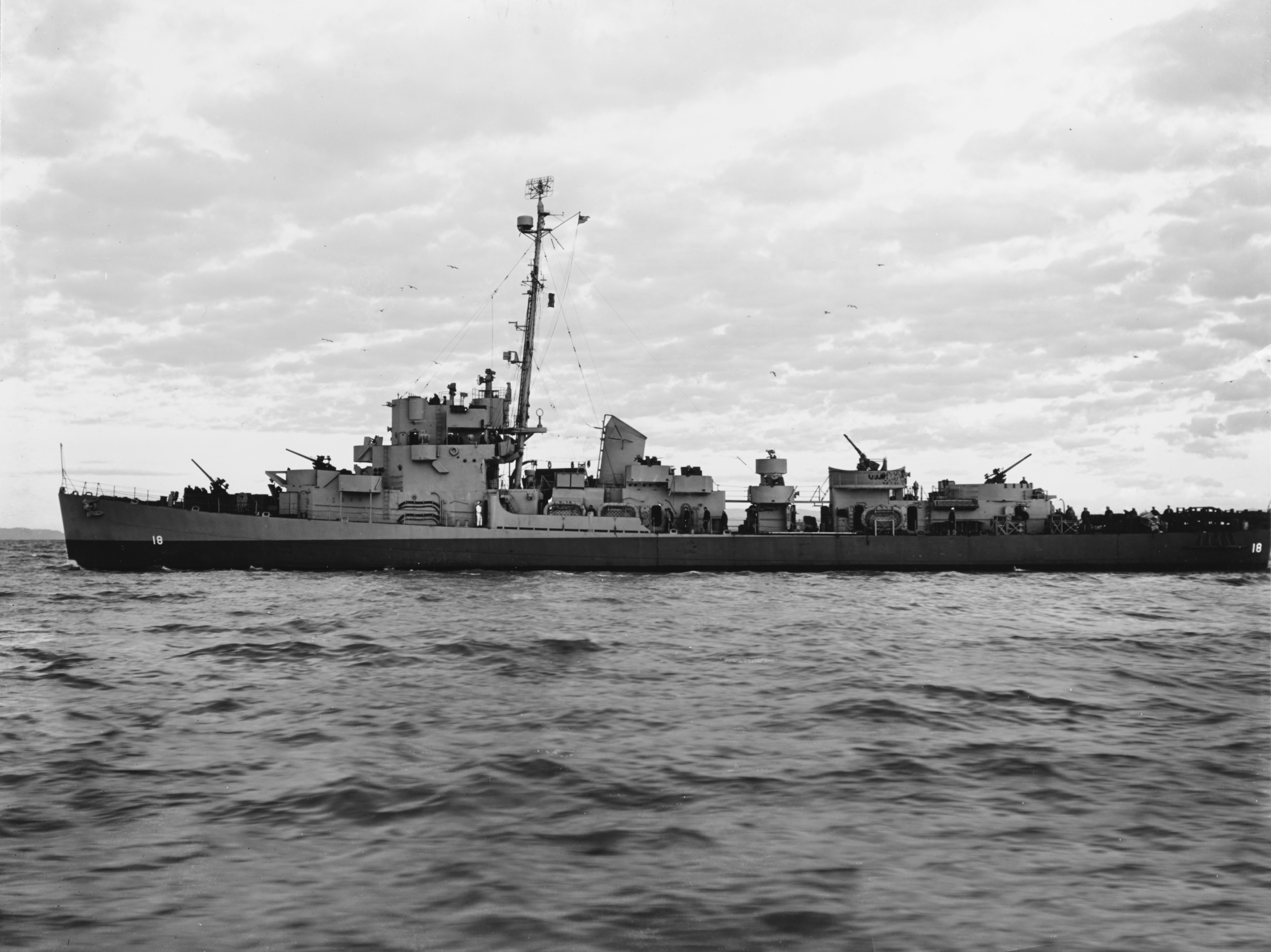
- USS Gilmore (DE-18) on 27 February 1945

History

United States
- Name: USS Gilmore
- Namesake: Walter William Gilmore
- Builder: Mare Island Navy Yard
- Laid down: 1 April 1942
- Launched: 22 October 1942
- Commissioned: 17 April 1943
- Decommissioned: 29 December 1945
- Stricken: 21 January 1946
- Honors and awards: 1 battle star (World War II)
- Fate: Sold for scrapping, 1 February 1947

General characteristics
- Type: Evarts-class destroyer escort
- Displacement: 1,140 long tons (1,158 t) standard; 1,430 long tons (1,453 t) full
- Length: 289 ft 6 in (88.24 m)
- Beam: 35 ft (11 m)
- Draft: 11 ft (3.4 m)
- Propulsion: 4 × General Motors Model 16-278A diesel engines with electric drive, 6,000 shp (4,474 kW); 2 screws
- Speed: 19 knots (35 km/h; 22 mph)
- Range: 4,150 nmi (7,690 km) at 12 kn (22 km/h; 14 mph)
- Complement: 15 officers and 183 enlisted
- Armament: 3 × single 3"/50 Mk.22 dual purpose guns; 1 × quad 1.1"/75 Mk.2 AA gun; 9 × 20 mm Mk.4 AA guns; 1 × Hedgehog Projector Mk.10 (144 rounds); 8 × Mk.6 depth charge projectors; 2 × Mk.9 depth charge tracks

USS Gilmore (DE-18) was an Evarts-class short-hull destroyer escort in the service of the United States Navy.

== Design ==
The Evarts-class destroyer escorts were 289 ft 5 in (88.21 m) long overall, and they had a beam of 35 ft 2 in (10.72 m). They had an average draft of 10 ft 1 in (3.07 m) at their full load displacement of 1,416 long tons (1,439 t). Each ship had a normal crew numbered 156 officers and sailors.

Gilmore was propelled by a pair of diesel motors manufactured by General Motors, which drove a pair of screw propellers. Her propulsion system was rated to produce 6,000 brake horsepower (4,500 kW) for a top speed of 19.5 knots (36.1 km/h; 22.4 mph). Oil storage amounted to between 131 and 197 long tons (133 and 200 t), which allowed a cruising radius of up to 6,000 nautical miles (11,000 km; 6,900 mi) at an economical pace of 10 knots (19 km/h; 12 mph).

The ship's armament consisted of a main battery of three 3-inch (76 mm) /50-caliber guns in individual pivot mounts, which could be used against air or surface targets. These were supported by a light anti-aircraft battery that initially consisted of four 1.1 in (28 mm) /75-caliber guns in a quadruple mount and nine 20 mm (0.79 in) Oerlikon guns. For attacks against submarines, the ship was equipped with a Hedgehog mortar, eight depth charge throwers, and two depth charge racks.

== Construction and commissioning ==
Originally allocated to the United Kingdom under terms of the Lend-Lease Program, the ship was launched as HMS Halder (BDE-18) on 22 October 1942 by Mare Island Naval Shipyard, California. The ship was sponsored by Mrs. Otis J. Boyer, wife of a Quarterman Rigger of the Mare Island Naval Shipyard. Halder was reallocated back to the United States Navy and renamed USS Gilmore on 19 February 1943, after Walter Gilmore, a naval officer killed aboard the aircraft carrier USS Lexington in the Battle of the Coral Sea. Gilmore was commissioned on 17 April 1943.

== Service history ==
=== Northern Pacific, 1943–1944 ===
Gilmore conducted her initial training in San Diego, California. After this initial training period she escorted troopships from San Francisco, California to Pearl Harbor from 28 June to 8 July 1943. Her next mission would be escorting the submarine tender Beaver to Attu Island on 20 September from San Francisco. Sailing as part of the 14 Destroyer Escort Division Pacific, she then served as the escort ship for the United States Coast and Geodetic Survey ship Surveyor from 18 to 29 October. For the next three months, Gilmore would serve as an escort between various Alaskan ports, until 20 January 1944. She then participated in air-sea rescue operations off the coast of Attu Island for the 4th Fleet Air Wing until 1 February.

Three days later, Gilmore left Attu for Adak escorting merchant ships, and then escorted USS Tippecanoe and SS Henry Failing to the Puget Sound Naval Shipyard in Bremerton, Washington, arriving on 16 February 1944. She returned to Dutch Harbor on 1 March and completed nine escort missions between that port and Attu by 20 April 1944.

She departed Dutch Harbor on 23 April to assist USS Edward C. Daly in the escort of merchantmen bound for Kodiak. Near midnight of 25 April her radar picked up a surfaced submarine which dived. Gilmore gained underwater sound contact, made two depth charge attacks, then regained contact at 0010, 26 April. She exploded six depth charges near the submarine and five minutes later six others were dropped directly over the target. A violent underwater explosion caused minor damage in the after motor room of Gilmore as the 1,630-ton Japanese Kaidai-class submarine I-180 settled to the bottom in latitude 50° 10' North; longitude 155°40' West.

Gilmore arrived at Kodiak on 29 April; returned to Dutch Harbor with Army transport Otsego on 9 May, and made five escort voyages between that port and Adak before serving on air-sea rescue station for pilots of Fleet Air Wing Four (1–4 July 1944). Fourteen more escort missions for troop transports were made to Kodiak, Adak, Attu, Kiska and Amchitka by 8 September 1944, followed by plane guard patrol west of Attu for Fleet Air Wing Four until 1 October. She then resumed escort missions between various Alaskan and Aleutian ports.

=== Western Pacific, 1945 ===
Gilmore departed Dutch Harbor on 13 January 1945 for overhaul in the Mare Island Naval Shipyard until 4 March, then sailed for Hawaii. She entered Pearl Harbor on 10 March, became flagship of Escort Division 14, and departed Pearl Harbor on 20 March as screen commander for a troopship convoy escorted safely to Eniwetok Atoll in the Marshalls on 29 March. After guarding the escort carrier Long Island to Apra Harbor, Guam, she touched at Saipan on 13 April to act as station guide for a task element of tank landing ships that arrived off Iwo Jima on the 18th. After joining Cassin in the escort of two merchantmen to Guam, she departed Saipan on 1 May 1945 with another convoy of amphibious assault ships that arrived off Iwo Jima on the 4th. Assigned to rescue station, she closed within 12 miles of Mount Suribachi that afternoon to rescue an Army aviator from his crashed plane. On the 10th she sent her medical officer to Jallao for treatment of injured airmen rescued by that submarine. She escorted Jallao into Tanapag Harbor, Saipan, on 12 May and was relieved as division flagship by Doherty on 20 July 1945.

Gilmore made an escort voyage for troopships to Okinawa and return (22 July – 7 August 1945), then joined an anti-submarine warfare task group built around the escort carrier Kasaan Bay for an unrewarding search for enemy submarines in waters extending some 250 miles (400 km) southwest of Guam. She returned to Saipan from this mission on 17 August 1945, made two escort voyages for troop convoys to Okinawa and return by 11 September, proceeded off Marcus Island for patrol (13–28 September), thence to Apra Harbor, Guam.

Gilmore sailed for home on 12 October via Pearl Harbor to San Pedro, California, arriving on 27 October 1945. Gilmore was decommissioned on 29 December 1945 and remained in the San Diego Group, U.S. Pacific Reserve Fleet, until sold for scrapping on 1 February 1947.

== Awards ==
- Combat Action Ribbon (retroactive)
- American Campaign Medal
- Asiatic-Pacific Campaign Medal (with one service star)
- World War II Victory Medal
