= HMS Cavendish (R15) =

C-class destroyer

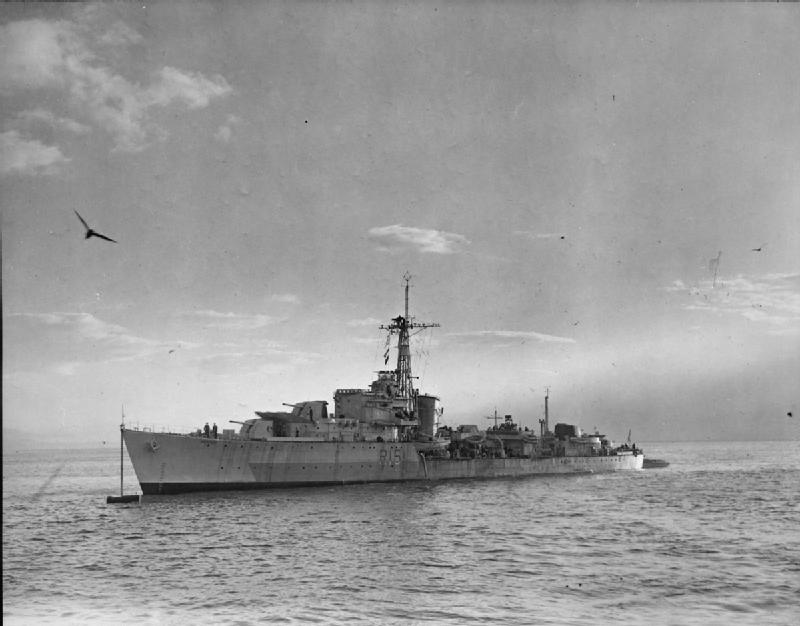
- Cavendish in 1945

History

United Kingdom
- Name: Cavendish
- Ordered: February 1942
- Builder: John Brown, Clydebank
- Laid down: 19 May 1943 as Sibyl
- Launched: 12 April 1944
- Completed: 12 December 1944
- Commissioned: 28 July 1944
- Out of service: Paid off on 1 January 1965
- Renamed: As Cavendish before launch
- Identification: Pennant number: R15 initially, but changed to D15 in 1945
- Motto: Cavendo tutus: ‘Safe by taking care‘
- Fate: Sold for scrap, 2 August 1967
- Badge: On a Field Blue, a ring Gold nowed at the base by a snake Proper.

General characteristics (as built)
- Class & type: C-class destroyer
- Displacement: 1,730 long tons (1,760 t) (standard)
- Length: 362 ft 9 in (110.6 m) o/a
- Beam: 35 ft 8 in (10.9 m)
- Draught: 14 ft 6 in (4.4 m) (full load)
- Installed power: 2 Admiralty 3-drum boilers; 40,000 shp (30,000 kW)
- Propulsion: 2 shafts; 2 geared steam turbines
- Speed: 36 knots (67 km/h; 41 mph)
- Range: 4,675 nautical miles (8,658 km; 5,380 mi) at 20 knots (37 km/h; 23 mph)
- Complement: 222
- Armament: 4 × single 4.5 in (114 mm) DP guns; 1 × twin 40 mm (1.6 in) AA gun; 2 × twin and 2 × single 20 mm (0.8 in) AA guns; 2 × quadruple 21 in (533 mm) torpedo tubes; 4 throwers and 2 racks for 108 depth charges

HMS Cavendish was one of eight C-class destroyers built for the Royal Navy during the Second World War. Commissioned in late 1944, she was built as a flotilla leader with additional accommodation for staff officers. The ship was assigned to the Home Fleet in 1945 after working up where she escorted capital ships of the fleet. Cavendish was sold for scrap in 1967.

== Design and description ==
The Ca-class destroyer was a repeat of the preceding Z class. The ships displaced 1,730 long tons (1,760 t) at standard load and 2,575 long tons (2,616 t) at deep load. They had an overall length of 362 feet 9 inches (110.6 m), a beam of 35 feet 8 inches (10.9 m) and a deep draught of 14 feet 6 inches (4.4 m).

The ships were powered by a pair of geared steam turbines, each driving one propeller shaft using steam provided by two Admiralty three-drum boilers. The turbines developed a total of 40,000 indicated horsepower (30,000 kW) and gave a speed of 36 knots (67 km/h; 41 mph) at normal load. During her sea trials, Cavendish reached a speed of 32.7 knots (60.6 km/h; 37.6 mph) at a load of 2,336 long tons (2,373 t). The Ca-class ships carried enough fuel oil to give them a range of 4,675 nautical miles (8,658 km; 5,380 mi) at 15 knots (28 km/h; 17 mph). As a flotilla leader, Cavendish's complement was 222 officers and ratings.

The main armament of the destroyers consisted of four QF 4.5-inch (114 mm) Mk IV dual-purpose guns, one superfiring pair each fore and aft of the superstructure protected by partial gun shields. Their anti-aircraft suite consisted of one twin-gun stabilised Mk IV "Hazemeyer" mount for 40-millimetre (1.6 in) Bofors guns amidships and two twin and a pair of single mounts for six 20-millimetre (0.8 in) Oerlikon AA guns. The ships were also fitted with two quadruple mounts amidships for 21-inch (533 mm) torpedo tubes. For anti-submarine work, they were equipped with a pair of depth charge rails and four throwers for 108 depth charges.

== Construction and career ==
Cavendish was laid down by John Brown & Company at their shipyard in Clydebank on 19 May 1943 with the name of Sibyl and was launched on 12 April 1944 by which time she had been renamed. She was commissioned on 13 December and was allocated to the 6th Destroyer Flotilla for service with the Home Fleet. After a refit in mid-1945 to augment her anti-aircraft armament, she was transferred for service in the Far East in June, but joined the East Indies Fleet at Trincomalee, British Ceylon, in August.

=== Post war service ===
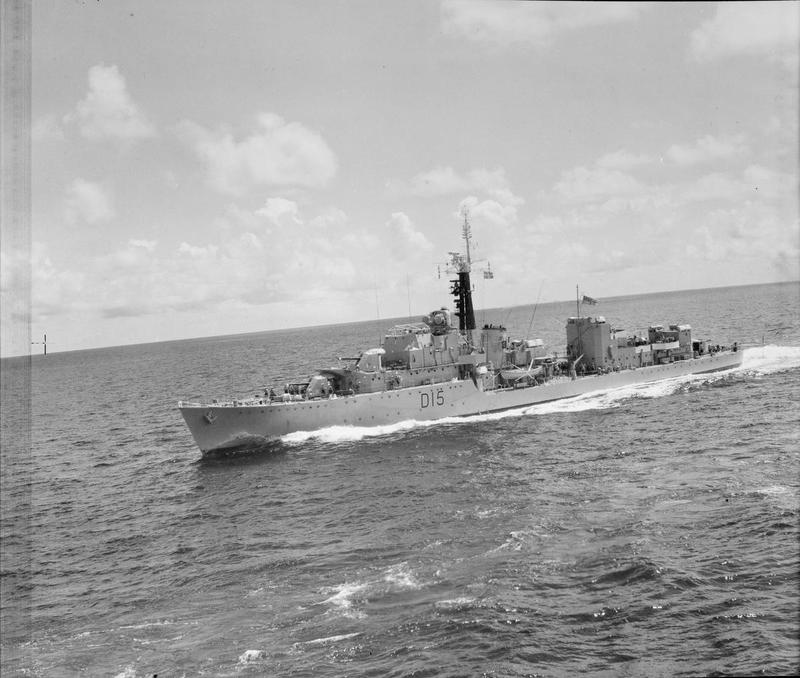
Cavendish during Exercise Fotex, 1964

Following the war Cavendish paid off into reserve. She was selected for modernisation and the work was completed in 1955. She emerged from modernisation in 1955 for service with the 6th Destroyer Flotilla as part of the Home Fleet, including service in the Mediterranean Fleet. In 1960 she was deployed for service with the Far East Fleet at Singapore. In 1964 she returned to Portsmouth and received a brief refit. Cavendish was paid off on 1 January 1965 and was sold for scrap to Hughes Bolckow on 2 August 1967. She arrived at the breaker's yard in Blyth for scrapping on 14 August 1967.

== Bibliography ==
- Chesneau, Roger, ed. (1980). Conway's All the World's Fighting Ships 1922–1946. Greenwich, UK: Conway Maritime Press. ISBN 0-85177-146-7.
- Colledge, J. J.; Warlow, Ben (2006) [1969]. Ships of the Royal Navy: The Complete Record of All Fighting Ships of the Royal Navy from the 15th Century to the Present (3rd Rev ed.). London: Chatham Publishing. ISBN 978-1-86176-281-8. OCLC 67375475.
- English, John (2001). Obdurate to Daring: British Fleet Destroyers 1941–45. Windsor, UK: World Ship Society. ISBN 978-0-9560769-0-8.
- Friedman, Norman (2006). British Destroyers and Frigates, the Second World War and After. Annapolis, Maryland: Naval Institute Press. ISBN 1-86176-137-6.
- Lenton, H. T. (1998). British & Empire Warships of the Second World War. Annapolis, Maryland: Naval Institute Press. ISBN 1-55750-048-7.
- March, Edgar J. (1966). British Destroyers: A History of Development, 1892–1953; Drawn by Admiralty Permission From Official Records & Returns, Ships' Covers & Building Plans. London: Seeley Service. OCLC 164893555.
- Marriott, Leo (1989). Royal Navy Destroyers Since 1945. Ian Allan. ISBN 0-7110-1817-0.
- Preston, Antony (1973). HMS Cavalier and the 'Ca' Class Destroyers. Warship Profile. Vol. 2. Windsor, UK: Profile Publications. OCLC 53090718.
- Rohwer, Jürgen (2005). Chronology of the War at Sea 1939–1945: The Naval History of World War Two (Third Revised ed.). Annapolis, Maryland: Naval Institute Press. ISBN 1-59114-119-2.
- Whitley, M. J. (1988). Destroyers of World War Two: An International Encyclopedia. Annapolis, Maryland: Naval Institute Press. ISBN 0-87021-326-1.
