= TSS Maianbar =

Australian coastal steamship

Coordinates: 32°55′29″S 151°47′33.4″E

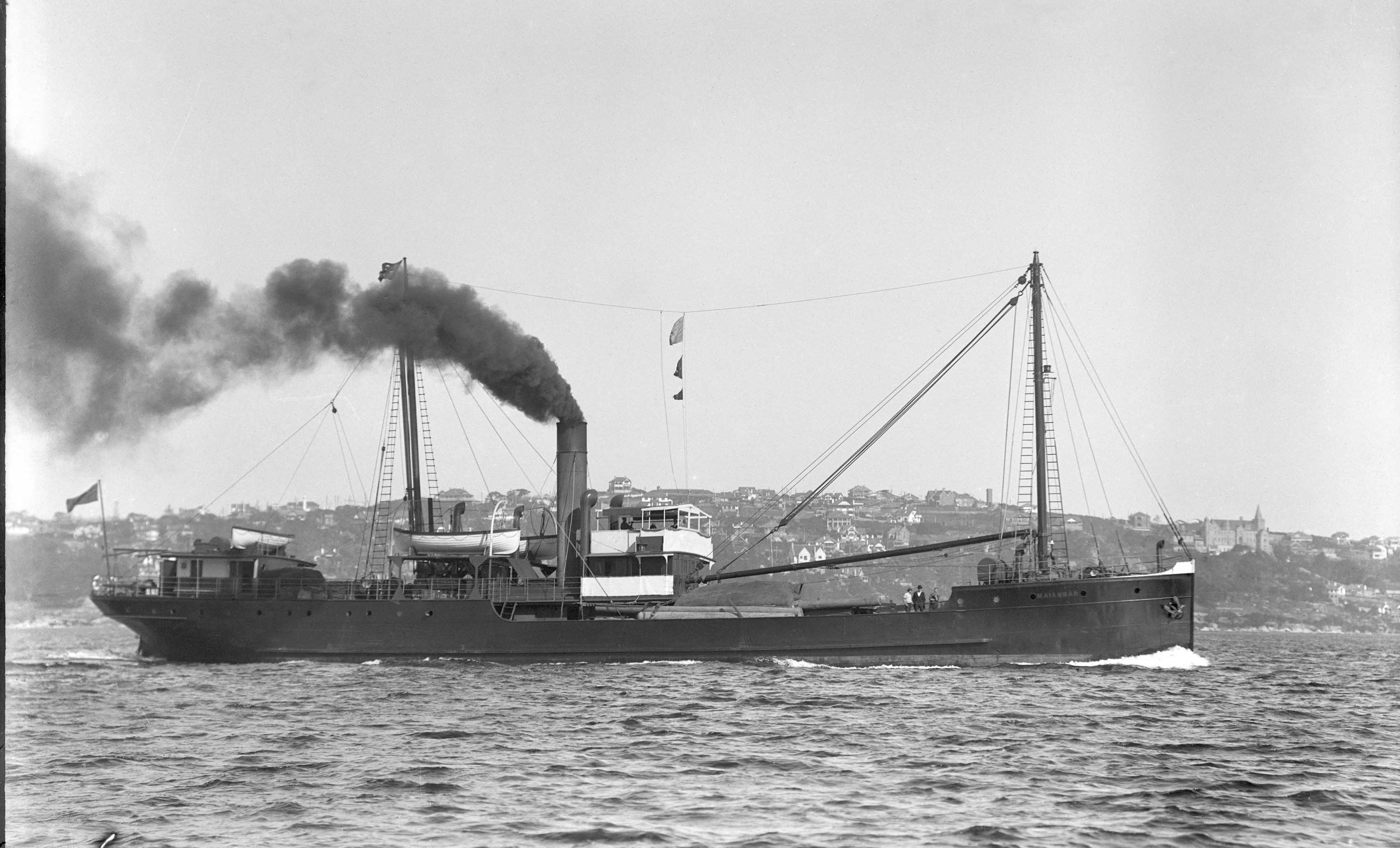

History

Australia
- Name: Maianbar
- Owner: North Coast Steam Navigation Company (1910–1937, 1940); Port Stephens Steamship Company (1937–1940)
- Port of registry: (Australia) Sydney
- Builder: Ardrossan Dry Dock & Ship Building Co, Ardrossan, Scotland
- Yard number: 239
- Laid down: 1910
- Launched: 3 September 1910
- Fate: Ran aground 5 May 1940; scrapped in situ

General characteristics
- Tonnage: As built: 487 GRT; After lengthening in 1920: 513 GRT; tonnage under deck 353; 229 NRT
- Length: As built: 155.6 ft (47.4 m); After lengthening in 1920: 175.6 ft (53.5 m) p/p
- Beam: 28.1 ft (8.6 m)
- Depth: 9.2 ft (2.8 m)
- Installed power: 99 RHP
- Propulsion: 2-cylinder compound steam engine

TSS Maianbar was a coastal steamship of the North Coast Steam Navigation Company. Built in Scotland in 1910 she ran aground in Newcastle, New South Wales in 1940 and was later scrapped on site.

== History ==
Ardrossan Dry Dock & Ship Building Co Ltd, of Ardrossan, Scotland built Maianbar in 1910 for the North Coast Steam Navigation Company. She replaced the one-year-old Minimbah, a 460 GRT steamship that broke her back after unsuccessfully trying to cross the Manning River Bar earlier that year. Minimbah's engine and boiler were salvaged, shipped back to Scotland and installed in Maianbar. The engine was a 99 RHP two-cylinder compound steam engine built by David Rowan & Co of Glasgow.

In 1920, Maianbar was beached at the entrance to Macleay River and took a month to be re-floated. After being re-floated, she went to Sydney to be overhauled and lengthened by 20 feet (6.1 m) by cutting the ship in two and inserting plating between the two halves. This increased her tonnage from 487 GRT to 513 GRT.

In 1937, the Port Stephens Steamship Company bought Maianbar from the North Coast Steam Navigation Co. In 1940 her original owners bought the vessel back, and on 5 May started towing her back from Port Stephens to Sydney. In fine weather off Newcastle the towline broke and she ran aground on Nobbys Beach. The ship could not be re-floated and was scrapped on site.
