= North Coast Steam Navigation Company =

Former Australian shipping company

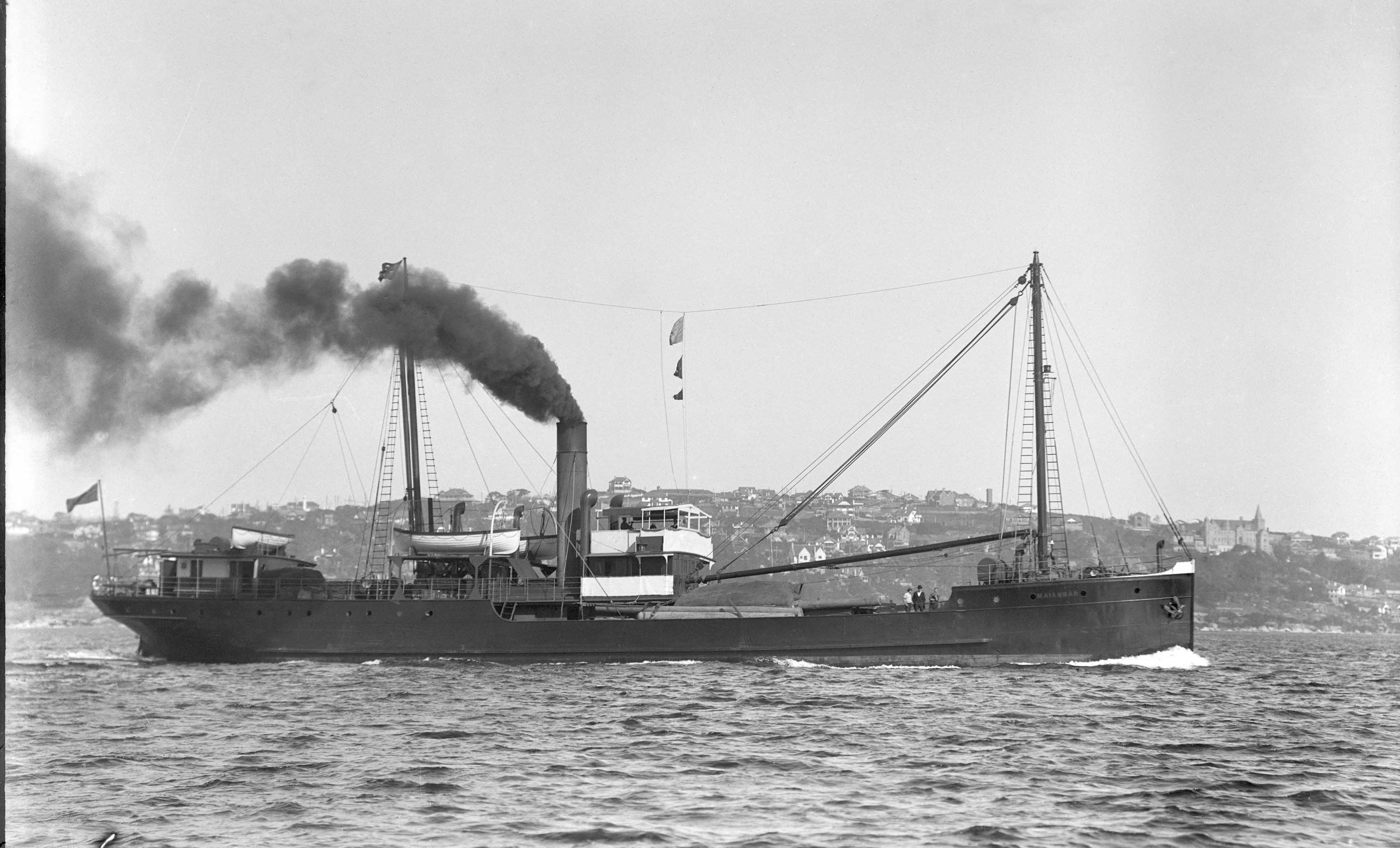
Coastal steamship Maianbar of the North Coast Steam Navigation Co

The North Coast Steam Navigation Company was a shipping company that operated in Australia, formed as the Grafton Steam Navigation Company in 1855. The company was later renamed the Clarence & Richmond River Steam Navigation Company before being renamed in December 1888 as the Clarence, Richmond & Macleay River Steam Navigation Company.

On 13 August 1891 the company merged with John See and Company and was renamed as the North Coast Steam Navigation Company and was based in Sydney. The steamships Noorebar, Cavauba, Dorrigo, and Wollumbin were bought from George Wallace Nicoll in 1905, 13 months before he died. In 1920 the company merged with Allan Taylor & Company and continued to operate the fleets under their own names. The company acquired Langley Bros in 1925 and bought the remaining fleet of the Coastal Co-Operative Steamship Company in 1929. The company further acquired the Port Stephens Steamship Company in 1940.

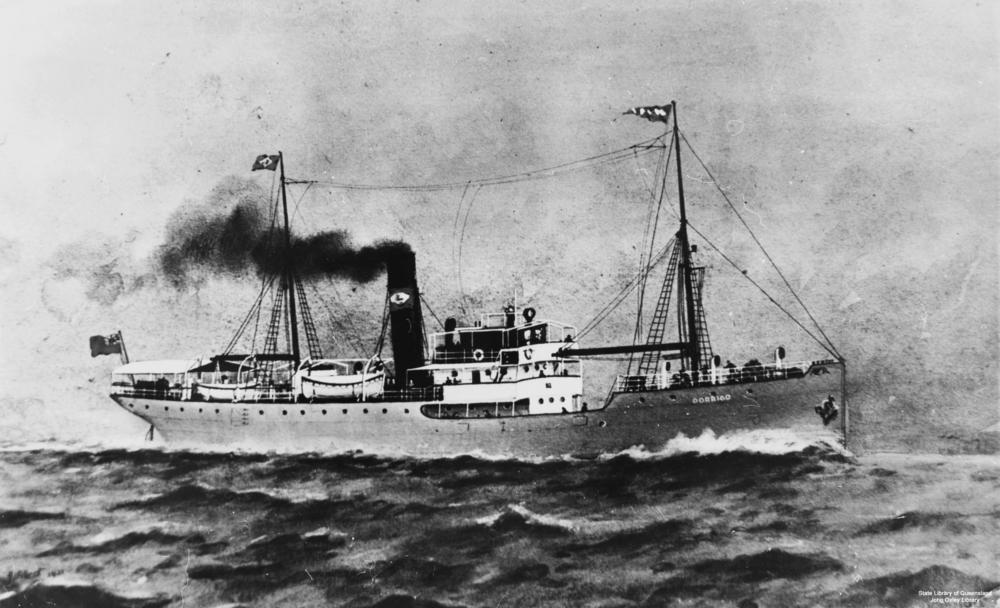
The Langley Brothers fleet that North Coast Steam Navigation Co took over in 1925 included Dorrigo

Many of the company's vessels were requisitioned by the Royal Australian Navy during World War II, and two ships were lost due to enemy action. On 5 December 1940 Nimbin was sunk about 8 nautical miles (15 km) off Norah Head, New South Wales by a mine laid by the German auxiliary cruiser Pinguin, killing 7 people including her Captain. On 29 April 1943 Wollongbar was torpedoed and sunk off Crescent Head, New South Wales, killing 32 of her 35 crew. Nambucca was destroyed by fire in 1945 while serving with the US Army small fleet in the Pacific islands.

The company traded until 1954, when it went into voluntary liquidation due to rising costs and unfavourable industrial conditions.

== List of ships ==
- Burringbar
- Canonbar
- Coolebar (1911)
- Coombar
- Comara, coaster built by Harland & Wolff, completed 7 April 1937
- Gunbar
- Maianbar
- Minimbah (1909)
- Noorebar (1904)
- Poonbar (1913)
- Pulganbar (1912)
- Tambar (1912)
- Tintenbar (1908)
- William the Fourth
- Wollongbar (1911)
- Wollongbar (1922)
- Yugilbar (1907)
