= HMAS Gunbar =

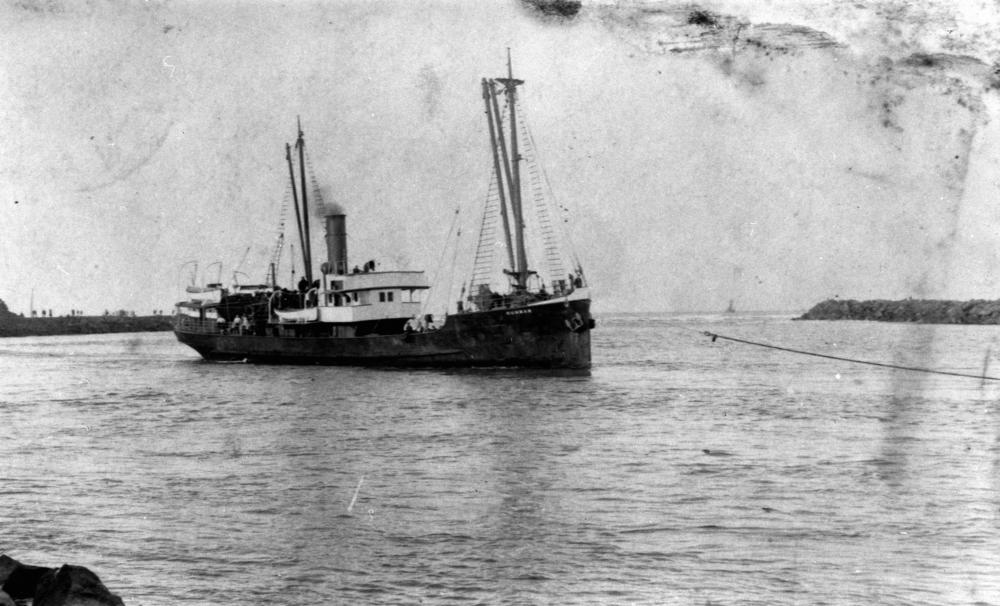
- Gunbar

History

Australia
- Name: Gunbar (1911-1946); West River (1946-1950)
- Owner: North Coast Steam Navigation Company
- Port of registry: Sydney
- Builder: Ardrossan Drydock & Shipbuilding Company, Glasgow
- Yard number: 243
- Launched: 9 December 1911
- Completed: February 1912
- Identification: UK Official Number: 131507; Call sign:VLFG
- Fate: Scrapped in 1950

History

Australia
- Name: HMAS Gunbar
- Acquired: 30 September 1940
- In service: 18 December 1940
- Out of service: 3 December 1945
- Fate: Sold in 1946

General characteristics
- Tonnage: 480 gross register ton
- Length: 150 ft (46 m)
- Beam: 30 ft (9.1 m)
- Depth: 8.7 ft (2.7 m)
- Propulsion: Twin screw
- Speed: 10 knots
- Complement: 4 officers and 23 ratings (RAN)
- Armament: 1 × 12 pounder 12 cwt QF; 1 (quad) .5 inch Vickers MG; 2 Depth Charge chutes (RAN)

HMAS Gunbar (GN) was an auxiliary minesweeper operated by the Royal Australian Navy (RAN) during World War II.

Gunbar was built by Ardrossan Drydock & Shipbuilding Company, Glasgow for the North Coast Steam Navigation Company and launched on 9 December 1911. She was sold in 1926 to the Gunbar Shipping Company> Gunbar was sold back to the North Coast Steam Navigation Company in 1929, before being sold again in the same year to Richardson & Company. She was sold again in 1935 to Smith & Ellis.

She was requisitioned by the RAN on 30 September 1940 and commissioned as HMAS Gunbar on 18 December 1940 for minesweeping duties during World War II. Gunbar was strafed and damaged during the Japanese air raid on Darwin on 19 February 1942, with one man killed. She was converted to a boom-gate vessel and served at Port Kembla and Sydney. She was paid off on 3 December 1945.

Bought by the RAN in 1946, she was sold to A.J. Ellerker and Company the same year. She was renamed West River and was in the process of being sold, however her sale fell through in 1950.

== Fate ==
West River was scrapped in Sydney in 1950.
