= SS Wollongbar (1911) =

1911 Australian passenger steamship

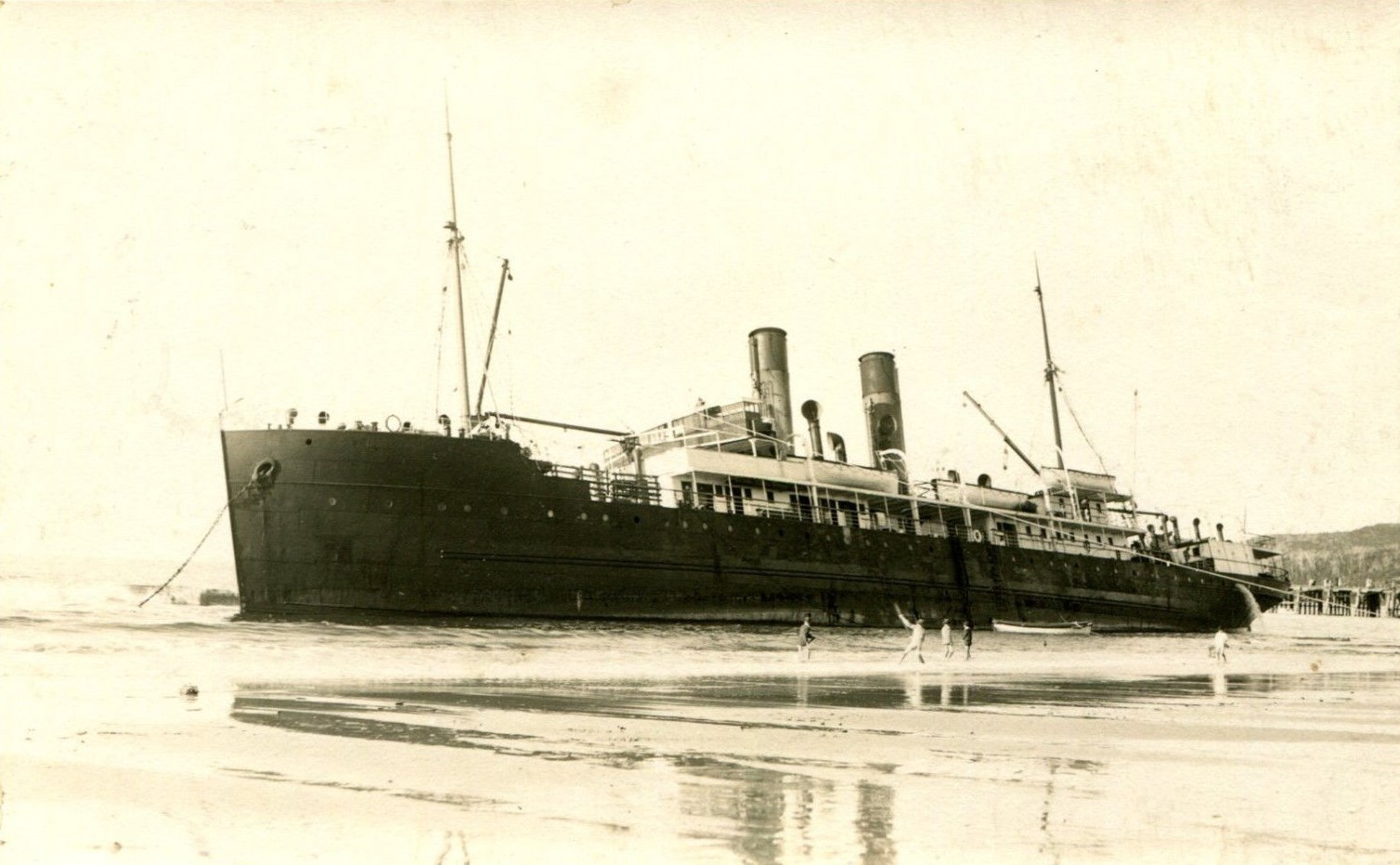

History
- Name: Wollongbar
- Owner: North Coast Steam Navigation Company
- Builder: Ailsa Shipbuilding Company, Troon
- Yard number: 229
- Launched: 1911
- Fate: Wrecked on 14 May 1921

General characteristics
- Tonnage: 2,005 GRT
- Length: 285.2 ft (86.9 m)
- Beam: 40.2 ft (12.3 m)
- Draught: 23.8 ft (7.3 m)
- Propulsion: Triple expansion engine
- Speed: 20 knots (37 km/h; 23 mph)

SS Wollongbar was a 2,005-ton passenger steamship built by the Ailsa Shipbuilding Company, Troon in 1911 for the North Coast Steam Navigation Company.

== Fate ==
She was wrecked at Byron Bay on 14 May 1921 after being blown aground during a gale at 28.637086°S 153.610378°E. Her wreck was broken up in situ.
